= WWE 2K Battlegrounds =

2020 professional wrestling video game

- Cover art featuring various wrestlers
- Developer: Saber Interactive Spain
- Publisher: 2K
- Director: Jesús Iglesias
- Producer: Tobias Heussner
- Designers: Alberto Infante; Fran Martinez
- Programmer: Rubén Segura
- Writer: Craig Sherman
- Composer: Steve Molitz
- Series: WWE 2K; Playground Sports
- Engine: Unreal Engine 4
- Platforms: Microsoft Windows; Nintendo Switch; PlayStation 4; Xbox One; Google Stadia
- Release: September 18, 2020
- Genre: Sports
- Modes: Single-player, multiplayer

WWE 2K Battlegrounds is a professional wrestling video game developed by Saber Interactive and published by 2K on September 18, 2020. A spin-off to the WWE 2K series and a part of the Playground Sports series, Battlegrounds is a fast-paced, arcade-style fighting game; similar in format to Saber's previous games, NBA Playgrounds and NBA 2K Playgrounds 2.

The game has been compared to 2011's WWE All Stars because of its deviation from the more simulator-oriented style of the mainline WWE games. The game itself was produced in lieu of the previously planned WWE 2K21; which was cancelled due to the development troubles, low sales, and the negative reception of 2019's WWE 2K20.

WWE 2K Battlegrounds received mixed reviews, with critics praising the art style and co-operative gameplay modes, but criticizing the use of microtransactions and lack of proper gameplay features.

== Development and release ==
In the aftermath to 2019's WWE 2K20 poor reception, rumors emerged that 2K's next WWE title would be entirely different from the rest of the WWE 2K series.

WWE 2K Battlegrounds was officially announced on April 27, 2020, as a spin-off to the WWE 2K series, while also announcing that video game industry veteran Patrick Gilmore would be the new game's executive producer. The trailer featured John Cena, The Rock, Becky Lynch, Charlotte Flair and Stone Cold Steve Austin. On May 4, 2020, an ESRB Rating confirmed that 2K Battlegrounds would be released on PlayStation 4, Xbox One, Microsoft Windows, Nintendo Switch (the first WWE game to be released on Switch since 2K18) and would be the only WWE game to release on Stadia, but 2K have yet to confirm this. On August 16, IGN revealed the game's entire roster, with superstars like Hulk Hogan, Jake Roberts, and "The Fiend" Bray Wyatt appearing in the base game, and additional superstars including Doink the Clown, The Boogeyman, Earthquake, and Typhoon announced to arrive as free, unlockable content in the months following the game's release. Later, it was announced that the characters could also be unlocked via microtransactions, like many other unlockables in the game.

On November 23, WWE 2K revealed that WrestleMania 36 host and tight end of the Tampa Bay Buccaneers, Rob Gronkowski, and NBA 2K21 current gen cover star and point guard of the Portland Trail Blazers, Damian Lillard, would be available as playable characters the following day and December 2, respectively.

The game was delisted from digital storefronts on February 26, 2026, and the online servers were shut down on July 9, 2026.

== Reception ==
Reception

Aggregate scores
Aggregator	Score
Metacritic	(NS) 56/100 (PS4) 60/100 (XONE) 57/100
OpenCritic	13% recommend

Review scores
Publication	Score
Destructoid	3/10 (PS4)
GamesRadar+	2/5 (XONE)
Hardcore Gamer	2.5/5 (PS4)
IGN	5/10
Nintendo Life	4/10 (NS)

The Nintendo Switch, PlayStation 4 and Xbox One versions of WWE 2K Battlegrounds received "mixed to average" reviews according to review aggregator website Metacritic. Fellow review aggregator OpenCritic assessed that the game received weak approval, being recommended by 13% of critics. Hyper Sauce of GamesRadar+ criticized the game's reliance on microtransactions, and stated that WWE video games had reached "its rock bottom". Destructoid opined that it was "a game nobody will remember a year from now." Writing for Nintendo Life, Chris Scullion denounced the game for being a grind and having limited replayability outside of the campaign mode, but did offer some praise to the co-op mode.

In a slightly more positive review for Hardcore Gamer, Cory Wells appreciated the game's lower retail price point and ability to be played as a party game, but agreed that micro-transactions and the lack of playable characters on offer tainted the experience. For IGN, Mitchell Saltzman commented that although the game was better than its predecessor, it was "nonetheless another in a growing series of misses for WWE video games."
