= 2K18 =

2K18 may refer to:

- the year 2018
- NBA 2K18, video game
- WWE 2K18, video game
