= 2K26 =

2K26 may refer to:

- The year 2026
- NBA 2K26, 2025 video game
- WWE 2K26, 2026 video game
