= 2K22 =

2K22 may refer to:

- The year 2022
- 2K22 Tunguska, Russian anti-aircraft weapon
- NBA 2K22, 2021 video game
- WWE 2K22, 2022 video game
