= 2K24 =

2K24 may refer to:

- The year 2024
- NBA 2K24, 2023 video game
- WWE 2K24, 2024 video game
