= 2K17 =

2K17 may refer to:

- the year 2017
- NBA 2K17, 2016 video game
- WWE 2K17, 2016 video game
