= NBA 2K (video game) =

1999 video game

- North American cover art featuring Allen Iverson
- Developer: Visual Concepts
- Publisher: Sega
- Producer: Tracy Johnson
- Programmer: Aki Rimpiläinen
- Series: NBA 2K
- Platform: Dreamcast
- Release: NA: November 11, 1999; JP: March 23, 2000; EU: August 2, 2000
- Genre: Sports
- Modes: Single-player, multiplayer

NBA 2K is a 1999 sports video game developed by Visual Concepts and published by Sega for the Dreamcast. It is the first installment of the NBA 2K series. Allen Iverson of the Philadelphia 76ers is featured as the cover athlete. The game is based on the National Basketball Association and, as such, allows the player to compete in basketball games with the current NBA season's players and teams. Several game modes are present, including one in which the player can create customizable players.

NBA 2K was well-received by critics, who praised it for setting the standard for basketball video games. A sequel, titled NBA 2K1, was released in 2000.

== Gameplay ==
NBA 2K, along with the series as a whole, strives to emulate the sport of basketball, more specifically, the National Basketball Association. It features the current players and teams from the 1999–2000 NBA season, and players may use them in several modes. Additionally, the player can create their own players and compile their own teams. The game features commentary from fictional announcers Bob Steele and Rod West (a play on Bob Barker and Rod Roddy, who were then the host and announcer, respectively, on the American game show The Price is Right), who are portrayed by Bob Fitzgerald and Rod Brooks respectively.

== Development and release ==
NBA 2K was developed as part of Sega's increased investment in its own sports titles for the Dreamcast. Former Sega of America president Peter Moore later said that Electronic Arts' decision not to support the Dreamcast prompted Sega to invest heavily in the Sega Sports brand, which subsequently evolved into 2K Sports.

Visual Concepts' Jeff Thomas recalled that the development team included staff with college basketball experience and used the same underlying technology that powered NFL 2K. In researching the game, the developers examined earlier basketball video games including NBA Jam, Dr. J and Larry Bird Go One on One, Double Dribble and Lakers versus Celtics and the NBA Playoffs. Thomas later described maintaining a frame rate of 60 frames per second as important to the responsiveness and feel of the series.

In a September 1999 preview, GamePro reported that the game, then known as NBA 2000, was being developed with eight different player body types, more than 100 dunk animations, interactive three-dimensional crowds and team-specific offensive and defensive strategies.

The game was initially known as Sega Sports NBA 2000 before Sega renamed it NBA 2K, alongside the renaming of NFL 2000 as NFL 2K. Its planned release was delayed from September to October because updated NBA player rosters were not available in time, and was subsequently moved to November so that Visual Concepts could add features and further refine the game.

The game was released in Japan on 23 March 2000 for ¥5,800. The Japanese edition retained English-language menus, and Sega promoted a limited first-print bonus guide titled NBA 2K Bible.

In September 2000, NBA 2K was included alongside NFL 2K in the Sega Sports Collector's Edition Dreamcast, a limited-edition North American bundle featuring a black Dreamcast console and matching controller with Sega Sports branding. The package retailed for US$169.99 and was intended to introduce new players to Sega's sports franchises ahead of their online-enabled sequels.

== Reception ==
Reception

Aggregate score
Aggregator	Score
GameRankings	88%

Review scores
Publication	Score
AllGame	4.5/5
CNET Gamecenter	7/10
Electronic Gaming Monthly	8.5/10 (Note: Two critics of Electronic Gaming Monthly gave the game each a score of 8/10, one gave it 8.5/10, and the other gave it 9.5/10.)
Famitsu	33/40
Game Informer	9/10
GameFan	94% (Note: In GameFan's viewpoint of the game, two critics gave it each a score of 94.)
GameRevolution	B+
GameSpot	8.8/10
GameSpy	7.5/10
IGN	9.2/10
Next Generation	4/5
The Cincinnati Enquirer	4/4

NBA 2K received "favorable" reviews according to the review aggregation website GameRankings. Praise was directed towards the visuals and controls in particular, while criticism was aimed at the lack of all-around polish.

Scott Alan Marriott for AllGame particularly praised the overall visuals and presentation. He called NBA 2K "a sports title that offers the graphics, playability, and artificial intelligence (AI) to convert nearly anyone who remotely enjoys the game of basketball into a hardcore fanatic". Game Informer's review, which is credited to Andrew Reiner, Andy McNamara, and Paul Anderson, mostly praised the realistic visuals and presentation. Reiner summarized his thoughts with, "The only complaint I have is the lame free-throw system. The rest of the game is oh so sweet." McNamara stated, "NBA 2K is a solid game with some great play mechanics. I like the play of NBA Live 2000 [...] better, but for graphics alone, I'll probably put more time in on NBA 2K." Lastly, Anderson wrote, "Even though you may initially find a few quirks in the game, the entire package is rock solid." Ryan MacDonald of GameSpot wrote: "In the end, NBA 2K's dazzling graphics, superb control, and strong AI make it the most dynamic basketball video game ever. However, Visual Concepts fell just short of delivering the same seamless gameplay of NFL 2K. The game's visuals and control, while both outstanding, just don't have the same cohesion that made NFL 2K so flawless. But even with these few problems, playing NBA 2K will just about ruin you for all other basketball games."

Brandon Justice of IGN wrote: "[W]hile the game has issues, it is easily worlds beyond anything else on the market, and truly raises the bar for video game basketball. In fact, I'd go so far as to say that it has done so in such a manner that even the high-jumping designers at Visual Concepts have difficulty clearing their own newfound level of excellence. Many aspects of this game are unbelievable, but it is the type of game that does just as much to open your eyes to the possibilities as it does to blow you away. In the end, we've got one hell of a basketball game, but a game that is far from perfect. While not quite as polished as NFL2K, NBA2K is most certainly a must have title for any sport fan, and is one of the most compelling reasons to own a Dreamcast to date."

The Enforcer of GamePro wrote in one review: "If you're crazy into sports, you gotta have NBA 2K. Not only is it the most outstanding-looking sports game of all time, it also plays like a champ. This is where the real showtime is." (Note: GamePro gave the game two 5/5 scores for graphics and fun factor, 4.5/5 for sound, and 4/5 for control in one review.) In another review, Uncle Dust said: "After the massive success of the Dreamcast launch title NFL 2K, Sega Sports is back with a vengeance with NBA 2K. The game features the same ultra-realistic graphics of the pigskin game, but it also throws in some of the most realistic hoops skills ever seen on a console, featuring over 1,300 motion-captured moves. The game also includes playbooks by the actual NBA coaches to make sure each team acts exactly as they do in the real NBA." (Note: GamePro gave the game all 5/5 scores for graphics, sound, control, and fun factor in another review.) Chris Slate of NextGen wrote that the game was "easy to pick up and get into, and looks flat-out gorgeous. If you're an NBA fan, this game alone is worth the price of a Dreamcast." In Japan, where the game was ported for release on March 23, 2000, Famitsu gave it a score of 33 out of 40. In Spain, DreamPlanet awarded the game a score of 90%, praising its realistic gameplay, detailed player models, intuitive controls and extensive customization options. The magazine considered it among the most accomplished basketball simulations available at the time.

GameSpot praised the game's graphics, controls and artificial intelligence, describing it as the "most dynamic basketball video game ever" and stating that playing it would "just about ruin you for all other basketball games".

NBA 2K was a finalist for "Outstanding Achievement in Visual Engineering" at the AIAS' 3rd Annual Interactive Achievement Awards, which was ultimately given to Unreal Tournament.

== Commercial performance ==
According to PC Data, NBA 2K sold an 310,000 units in North America throughout the year 2000. Historical NPD sales figures reproduced by Blast Processing! recorded 725,045 copies sold in North America by March 2003. It is the all time sixth-best-selling Dreamcast games by unit sales and fourth by dollar sales in the US.

In Japan, the game sold an estimated 43,662 copies, according to a compilation of Famitsu sales data.

In Europe, NBA 2K reportedly sold well in Spain but performed poorly in the rest of the continent, leading Sega Europe to initially decide against releasing subsequent installments in the region. In Spain, NBA 2K topped the Dreamcast sales chart of video game retailer Centro Mail in May 2000. It remained among the retailer's ten best-selling Dreamcast games in the following four monthly issues of DreamPlanet, ranking second in June, third in July, seventh in August–September, and tenth in October.

NBA 2K was TecToy's best-selling Dreamcast game in Brazil.

== Legacy and Influence ==
The game launched the NBA 2K series, which originated as a Dreamcast exclusive in 1999 and subsequently became one of the most recognizable sports video game franchises.

In a retrospective marking the series' tenth anniversary, GameSpot stated that the original game "did nearly as much for basketball" as NFL 2K had done for American football. In a separate Dreamcast retrospective, the publication identified the console as the birthplace of the 2K Sports series and cited the early NBA 2K and NFL 2K titles among the games that advanced sports-game presentation and graphics.

Allen Iverson, who appeared on the cover of the original game, remained the series' cover athlete for its first five installments. Reflecting on the series' 25th anniversary in 2023, Iverson said that he had never anticipated how closely his legacy would become linked with that of NBA 2K, describing the franchise as a "global phenomenon" that had influenced generations of basketball fans and players.
