= Ronnie Singh =

American content creator and marketing executive

Rajbir “Ronnie” Singh, better known as Ronnie 2K, is a content creator, podcaster, and brand ambassador for NBA 2K Video Games. As of 2026, he is the Head of Lifestyle and Content Marketing.

== Early life ==
Originally from India, Singh's parents immigrated to the United States before Ronnie was born in Fort Lauderdale, Florida. Singh grew up in the San Francisco Bay Area (Marin County), where he attended Redwood High School in Larkspur, CA. While they worked in “traditional business,” Singh's mother and father encouraged him to be a doctor, attorney, or computer scientist. He identifies as a first-generation college student in the U.S.

Singh was passionate about sports as a youth and played basketball at the University of California at San Diego where he earned a bachelor's degree in management science and also minored in law. He took the LSAT exam and planned to become an attorney and sports agent, inspired by the character Jerry Maguire played by Tom Cruise.

== Career ==
Following graduation from UCSD, Singh worked at two law firms, including Morrison and Forester, before committing to the field. He moved on from this role to work full-time as the public relations director for the San Diego Siege, a minor league women's basketball team. From 2006-2007, he served as Director of Operations for the San Diego Surf Dawgs, a baseball league, running game day operations. In this role, Singh's first grassroots marketing campaign included placing stickers on grape juice boxes for player Jose Canseco, which caught the attention of ESPN's SportsCenter.

=== NBA 2K ===
Singh was an early adopter of NBA 2K, an online video game, which he played for fun after work. He excelled at the game, and he regularly posted on message boards. Singh contacted Sarah Anderson, head of marketing, and asked her thoughts about him creating a Twitter account named Ronnie2K. Due to his activity, he later was invited by a staff member to run an online forum on behalf of the company.

Singh began working full-time at 2K games in March 2008. In his role as marketing director, he announces the ratings for each NBA player's avatar in the game, and NBA players often contact him directly when they are disappointed in their player ratings. A turning point in his career occurred when he was unexpectedly asked to interview players and celebrities, such as Russell Westbrook and Lloyd Banks, at a launch party for NBA 2K11, which increased his stature as a national influencer.

== Personal life ==
Singh is the oldest of three boys and lived in London for a brief period of time as a youth. His family identifies as Sikhs. Singh was short as a child but reached 6'6 as an adult. At Ronnie's wedding, his father joked about Ronnie's career: "We still have no idea [what he does], but it looks cool." In 2025, Singh was inducted into the Redwood High School Hall of Fame (also known as the Avenue of Giants—or AOG) for his career success and philanthropic work in the U.S. and abroad.
