= NBA 2K20 =

2019 video game

- Cover art featuring Los Angeles Lakers player Anthony Davis
- Developer: Visual Concepts
- Publisher: 2K
- Series: NBA 2K
- Platforms: Windows; Nintendo Switch; PlayStation 4 Xbox One iOS; Android; Google Stadia
- Release: Windows, Switch, PS4, Xbox One, iOS, Android; September 6, 2019; Stadia; November 19, 2019
- Genre: Sports
- Modes: Single-player, multiplayer

NBA 2K20 is a 2019 basketball video game developed by Visual Concepts and published by 2K. Based on the National Basketball Association (NBA), it is the 21st installment in the NBA 2K franchise, the successor to NBA 2K19, and the predecessor to NBA 2K21. Anthony Davis of the Los Angeles Lakers is the cover athlete for the regular edition of the game, while Dwyane Wade is the cover athlete for the 'Legend Edition' The game is NBA 2K's last 2010s entry.

NBA 2K20 was released on September 6, 2019, for Microsoft Windows, Nintendo Switch, PlayStation 4, Xbox One, iOS, Android and on November 18, 2019, for Google Stadia.

== Development and release ==
NBA 2K20 was officially announced in the spring of 2019 with a release date set for September 6, 2019. The covers were revealed on July 1, 2019, though they were both leaked earlier. Although Davis is featured in the game as a member of the Lakers, he wears a generic jersey on the cover because it was released before Davis was officially traded from the New Orleans Pelicans to the Los Angeles Lakers. Davis was one of three players on the NBA 2K16 cover. All three versions of the game had pre-order bonuses. It was released for Microsoft Windows, Nintendo Switch, PlayStation 4, Xbox One, iOS, Android, and Stadia.

The Xbox One S and Xbox One X will receive special edition bundles, which will include a digital download of NBA 2K20. A limited version of the game will also be released for Android and iOS.

== Gameplay ==
The player mainly plays NBA games with real-life or customized players and teams; games follow the rules and objectives of NBA games. Several game modes are present and many settings can be customized. Up to six expansion teams can be created and used in both MyLeague and MyGM Modes, with the possibility of a 36-team league, and any team can be relocated and rebranded. If you're creating a team you can download jerseys and teams that people from the NBA community has made.

Along with the current season's teams and players, previous games in the series have featured NBA teams from past eras, such as the 1995–96 Chicago Bulls and the 1985–86 Boston Celtics. NBA 2K20 adds six more such teams, such as the 2015-16 Cleveland Cavaliers and the 2013-14 San Antonio Spurs.

As with other games in the series, the in-studio pregame and halftime shows are based on the real-life NBA on TNT presentations, featuring Ernie Johnson, Kenny Smith, and Shaquille O'Neal, with the latter two analysts also appearing as players on the 1993-94 Houston Rockets and 1994-95 Orlando Magic/2000-01 Los Angeles Lakers/2005-06 Miami Heat, respectively. During games, the announcers are Kevin Harlan, Greg Anthony, Chris Webber, Steve Smith, Clark Kellogg, and Doris Burke, with David Aldridge as the sideline reporters. Charles Barkley has not been added to the halftime show.

For the first time ever in the NBA 2K series, all twelve teams from the WNBA are included; however, they can be only used in Play Now (one-game exhibition) and single-season modes. It includes Candace Parker as well as other WNBA All-Stars. You cannot create rosters for the WNBA teams.

A staple of the series, MyCareer, returns as one of the available game modes. MyCareer is a career mode in which the player creates their own customizable basketball player and plays through their basketball career. The mode features a storyline (with the voices of actors including Idris Elba, Rosario Dawson, Thomas Middleditch, Mark Cuban, Ernie Hudson and Lamorne Morris) which plays out as the player competes in games as well as off-court activities. The creation tools have been overhauled. The Neighborhood also returns to MyCareer in which players can customize their wardrobe, get haircuts and tattoos, and purchase power-ups. They can also do their workouts and run drills to improve their attributes at their current team's practice facility. You gain more attributes when a Hall of Famer visits your practice facility

The game's returning MyGM and MyLeague game modes, which task the player with managing all basketball operations for a specific team, were a point of emphasis during development. MyGM is more focused on realism, whereas MyLeague offers more customization options. MyGM mode attempts to introduce more cutscene-style interactions than previous games in an attempt to give the mode a storyline, which is dubbed My GM 2.0.

NBA 2K20 again, for the eighth time in the series, features MyTeam mode, a mode based around the idea of building the ultimate basketball team and maintaining a virtual trading card collection. Players assemble and play with their team in basketball tournament-style competitions against other players' teams in several formats. Assets for a team are acquired through various means, including randomized card packs and the auction house. Virtual Currency (VC) is used extensively in the mode. Triple Threat Offline is changed to a ladder format where you accumulate wins to earn prizes. Domination is also changed, you now have to earn 5 stars in a division/section to advance to the next division/section, and each team now has three difficulties to choose from, the harder the difficulty, the more stars you get.

== Reception ==
Reception

Aggregate score
Aggregator	Score
Metacritic	(XONE) 80/100 (PS4) 78/100 (PC) 74/100

Review scores
Publication	Score
Game Informer	8.5/10
GameRevolution	4.5/5
IGN	7.8/10

=== Pre-release ===
The official trailer for NBA 2K20's MyTeam mode, which allows players to buy content with real-world money, received criticism for its revealing of minigames styled as real-world gambling such as pachinko and slot machines, roulette wheels, ball-drop games, and the opening of randomized card packs. While some of the mechanics had been introduced to the series prior, critics felt that featuring them in a single trailer was "more in-your-face" and noted they were emphasized over showing gameplay of basketball matches. Some also called the trailer "tone-deaf", due to being released at a time when loot boxes had become highly scrutinized and regulated under governing bodies and 2K had made changes to NBA 2K19 to comply with new laws, despite 2K asserting at the time that they did not consider loot boxes as gambling. The trailer was made unlisted on YouTube shortly after by 2K.

In response to the outcry that such mechanics were included in a game rated ages 3 and up, Pan European Game Information (PEGI) stated that as the title had not yet been released, only its trailer could be assessed. They found that the featured casino-like mechanics to select items by chance did not fit the criteria for a gambling label, as the game "must actually teach ... and/or encourage the player to want to gamble or bet for money in real life". However, PEGI noted that "we are very aware that it may get too close for comfort for some people", and said that due to such changes in an evolving industry, "we need to ensure that these developments are reflected in our classification criteria."

=== Post-release ===
NBA 2K20 received "generally favorable reviews" according to review aggregator Metacritic.

In its 7.8/10 review, IGN wrote: "NBA 2K20 would have been better off by focusing on its complex modes like MyLeague and cleaning up MyTeam to be less dependent on microtransactions. In spite of that, NBA 2K20 remains the best at what it does. It just might be time to ask for better." Game Revolution gave the game 4.5 out of 5, writing: "NBA 2K20's fantastic feel on the courts and how its main modes work as advertised are the most important parts. Some of the secondary additions might be lacking when compared to the polish seen in the new cinematic story mode, but they still serve their purpose to flesh out the package."

The game topped the European download sales charts.

=== Awards ===
Year	Award	Category	Result	Ref
2019	Gamescom	Best Simulation Game	Nominated	
2019	Titanium Awards	Best Sports/Racing Game	Won	
2020	23rd Annual D.I.C.E. Awards	Sports Game of the Year	Nominated	
2020	NAVGTR Awards	Control Design, 2D or Limited 3D	Nominated	
2020	NAVGTR Awards	Control Precision	Nominated	
2020	NAVGTR Awards	Game, Franchise Sports	Nominated	
