= NBA 2K27 =

2026 video game

- Standard Edition cover featuring Victor Wembanyama
- Developer: Visual Concepts
- Publisher: 2K
- Series: NBA 2K
- Platforms: Nintendo Switch 2; PlayStation 5; Xbox Series X/S; Windows; Arcade Edition; iOS; macOS; tvOS; visionOS
- Release: WW: September 4, 2026 (Note: Players who purchased the Deluxe Edition or the Ultra Edition can access the game on August 26, 2026.); Arcade Edition: WW: November 5, 2026
- Genre: Sports
- Modes: Single-player, multiplayer

NBA 2K27 is a 2026 basketball video game developed by Visual Concepts and published by 2K. Based on the National Basketball Association (NBA) and Women's National Basketball Association (WNBA), it is the 28th installment in the NBA 2K series and the successor to NBA 2K26 (2025). The game was released for the Nintendo Switch 2, PlayStation 5, Xbox Series X/S, and Windows on September 4, 2026. It is the first game to officially support DLSS 5.

== Development ==
NBA 2K27 was officially announced on July 28, 2026. The announcement revealed the cover athletes across three editions: Victor Wembanyama for the Standard Edition, Caitlin Clark for the Deluxe Edition, and Derrick Rose for the limited-time Ultra Edition. Wembanyama's selection followed his historic unanimous Defensive Player of the Year award, while Clark became the first WNBA player to headline a global premium edition of the game. Rose's Ultra Edition celebrated his legacy as the youngest NBA MVP in history.

On November 16, 2026, the Vice City Edition was announced with Bam Adebayo on the cover to mark the promotion for Grand Theft Auto VI.

== Gameplay ==
NBA 2K27 features gameplay improvements with smarter AI defense, a redesigned dynamic Dunk Meter, and expanded MyPlayer customization with 53 Badges and returning Cap Breakers. MyTeam introduces a unified Auction House across supported current-generation platforms, while MyNBA adds modern league management features such as CBA updates and No-Trade Clauses. MyCareer and The City receive a new nighttime aesthetic, a returning centralized layout, and the addition of Rucker Park as a major streetball location, and Casual Corner, a new area offering relaxed 3v3 and 5v5 gameplay.

The game also introduces over 7,000 new ProPlay animations, new offensive mechanics such as step-through up-and-unders, expanded dribbling customization, a Dynamic Layup Engine, and a redesigned Dunk Meter. Defense receives improved hands-up defense, shot contests, Defensive Cutoffs, skill-based ankle breakers, and a new ball collision system. The Takeover system features five disciplines with six tiers, while Advanced Controls, upgraded Rhythm Shooting, and smarter AI further improve gameplay.

MyCareer features an 11-chapter story, Fire & Concrete, which follows MP from high school through the G League and NBA, with a dynamic draft board allowing players to influence their draft position and team. MyCareer also introduces five historical Eras spanning from the 1984 Magic vs. Bird era to the 2016 Steph era, while Running Mate allows another player to control MP's teammate Trace Miller in co-op play.

The MyPlayer Builder adds female MyPlayers, Badge Tokens, and a new Synergy System. MyTeam introduces an all-new Player XP system, an expanded Exchange, and rotating multiplayer modes, while Breakout and Gauntlet receive expanded progression features. New Player Card Parallels are also added.

== Features ==
NBA 2K27 supports Nvidia DLSS 5 with 3D-guided neural rendering on PC, marking the technology's debut in gaming, while enhancing lighting, materials, skin, hair, and shadows without altering player likenesses. The feature is available on GeForce RTX 50 series GPUs and GeForce Now.

== Release ==
NBA 2K27 launched with early access beginning on August 26, 2026. This is the first NBA 2K to not release on the eighth generation of consoles. Early access was available exclusively through the Deluxe and Ultra Editions on PlayStation 5, Xbox Series X/S, and PC until the game's worldwide release on September 4, 2026.

== Reception ==
Reception

Aggregate scores
Aggregator	Score
Metacritic	(PC) 74/100 (PS5) 78/100 (XSX) 81/100
OpenCritic	60% recommend (Note: Based on 52 reviews)

Review score
Publication	Score
IGN	6/10

According to the review aggregation website Metacritic, the PC version of NBA 2K27 received "mixed or average" reviews from critics, while the PlayStation 5 and Xbox Series X versions both received generally favorable reviews from critics. Fellow review aggregator OpenCritic assessed that the game received strong approval, being recommended by 60% of critics.

IGN gave NBA 2K27 a 6/10, praising its improved defensive gameplay, smoother on-court movement, the new Dunk Meter, Casual Corner, female players in The City, and Running Mate co-op. However, it criticized the Fire and Concrete story, limited MyCareer Eras and MyNBA Legacy, inability to transfer players between eras, and emphasis on microtransactions.
