= NBA 2K1 =

2000 basketball video game

- North American cover art featuring Allen Iverson
- Developer: Visual Concepts
- Publisher: Sega
- Series: NBA 2K
- Platform: Dreamcast
- Release: NA: October 31, 2000; JP: March 29, 2001
- Genre: Sports
- Modes: Single-player, multiplayer

NBA 2K1 is a 2000 sports video game developed by Visual Concepts and published by Sega. It was the first NBA 2K game to feature online multiplayer and the first game to feature street courses instead of playing a game inside the arena in the first game, famous street courts such as The Cage, Rucker Park, Franklin Park, and Goat Park.

== Gameplay ==
New features were added to NBA 2K1. This includes the new Association, General Manager, and Street modes. The game features rosters from the 2000–01 NBA season.

== Cover ==
The cover athlete was featured as Allen Iverson of the Philadelphia 76ers until the release of ESPN NBA 2K5.

== Reception ==
Reception

Aggregate score
Aggregator	Score
Metacritic	93/100

Review scores
Publication	Score
AllGame	4.5/5
CNET Gamecenter	9/10
Electronic Gaming Monthly	9.17/10 (Note: Two critics of Electronic Gaming Monthly gave the game each a score of 9/10, and the other gave it 9.5/10.)
EP Daily	8.5/10
Famitsu	30/40
Game Informer	9.5/10
GameFan	95%
GameSpot	9.6/10
GameSpy	9/10
IGN	8.8/10
Next Generation	4/5
The Cincinnati Enquirer	4.5/5

The game received "universal acclaim" according to video game review aggregator Metacritic. Rob Smolka of NextGen said that the game was "Highly recommended, but frankly, we were expecting a lot more based on the improvement of NFL 2K1 over NFL 2K." In Japan, where the game was ported for release on March 29, 2001, Famitsu gave it 30 out of 40.

Uncle Dust of GamePro said in one review, "With a deeper array of options, sharper graphics, and better A.I., NBA 2K1 is a solid improvement to an already great game; add the option of online play, and you have yourself a tough game to beat—on any system." (Note: GamePro gave the game two 5/5 scores for graphics and fun factor, and two 4/5 scores for sound and control in one review.) In another GamePro review, Kilo Watt said, "The game is not perfect, but at the end of the day it's still a very satisfying experience. The franchise mode is fantastic, and the inclusion of the all-time greats, special uniforms, and street courts really pushes NBA 2K1 into primetime territory. The online play has its own nuances that just have to be accepted, but the fact that it works as well as it does is pretty impressive. The DC hoop crown looks to be firmly in the hands of Sega Sports right now." (Note: GamePro gave the game 5/5 for graphics, and three 4.5/5 scores for sound, control, and fun factor in another review.)

The game was a runner-up for the "Best Multiplayer Game" and "Best Sports Game (Traditional)" awards at GameSpot's Best and Worst of 2000 Awards, which went to Quake III Arena and NFL 2K1, respectively.

Game Informer ranked it at 95 on its top 100 video games of all-time list. The staff praised the developers for maintaining the quality gameplay of its predecessor while adding online, new settings, and a Franchise mode.

According to PC Data, NBA 2K1 sold 500,000 units in 2000. It is the fifth-best-selling Dreamcast game of all time in the US.
