= Sports USA Radio Network =

American sports radio network

Sports USA Media is the largest independent sports broadcasting radio network in the United States, specializing in live broadcasts of American football, specifically of the NCAA football Division I-A and National Football League (NFL). In 2018, more than 450 radio stations across the United States carried NFL and NCAA football games from Sports USA.

== Programs ==
=== The NFL on Sports USA ===
Sports USA began broadcasting NFL games in 2002. The company broadcasts two games every Sunday during the NFL regular season for a total of 36 games by arrangement with the individual home teams.

=== The NHL on Sports USA ===
In February 2021, Sports USA reached a deal with NBC Sports, which was phasing out of both radio and hockey, to take over its rights to national radio broadcasts of the National Hockey League. That season, it aired two outdoor games, selected early round playoff games, and all games from the Stanley Cup Semifinals and Finals. Later in 2021, Sports USA renewed its rights until the 2024-25 season. Unlike other league's major championship coverage, this coverage is not exclusive and stations that are affiliated with the participating Stanley Cup Finals team's radio networks will be allowed to carry and stream coverage.

== Announcers ==
Sports USA has a large list of announcers for its football coverage. Play-by play announcers include the network's founder and former USC Trojans football broadcaster Larry Kahn, Anaheim Ducks broadcaster John Ahlers, Golden State Warriors announcer Bob Fitzgerald, Eli Gold (former voice of the Alabama Crimson Tide, perhaps better known nationally for his work on NASCAR). Analysts include former Washington Commanders and Carolina Panthers head coach Ron Rivera, former NHL goaltender and Anaheim Ducks color commentator Brian Hayward, New England Patriots all time scoring leader Stephen Gostkowski, & former Indianapolis Colts tight end and ESPN, studio and game analyst Charles Arbuckle.

== Podcasts ==
Sports USA produced a variety of sports podcasts including:

Conversations with Joe Morgan was a weekly podcast from the Cincinnati Reds late Hall of Famer and two-time World Series Champion Joe Morgan. Previous guests on Morgan's program show included the late former president George H. W. Bush, Bill Russell, Bob Costas, Charles Barkley and a host of others.

Snakes Takes with Jake Plummer was a weekly podcast hosted by former Pro Bowl quarterback who played 10 seasons in the NFL with the Arizona Cardinals and Denver Broncos. Jake Plummer is currently an NFL game analyst on Sports USA's Sunday Doubleheader package as well as a college football analyst on the Pac-12 Network.
