= NBA 2K19 =

2018 video game

- Cover art featuring Milwaukee Bucks player Giannis Antetokounmpo
- Developer: Visual Concepts
- Publisher: 2K
- Series: NBA 2K
- Platforms: Windows; Nintendo Switch; PlayStation 4 Xbox One; Android iOS
- Release: WW: September 11, 2018
- Genre: Sports
- Modes: Single-player, multiplayer

NBA 2K19 is a 2018 basketball video game developed by Visual Concepts and published by 2K. Based on the National Basketball Association (NBA), it is the 20th installment in the NBA 2K franchise, the successor to NBA 2K18, and the predecessor to NBA 2K20. Giannis Antetokounmpo of the Milwaukee Bucks is the cover athlete for the standard edition, while LeBron James (who was also the cover athlete of NBA 2K14) of the Los Angeles Lakers is the cover athlete for the 20th Anniversary Edition. Antetokounmpo and James grace the cover in North America, while Australia native Ben Simmons of the Philadelphia 76ers is featured on the cover in Australia and New Zealand.

NBA 2K19 was released on September 11, 2018, for Windows, Nintendo Switch, PlayStation 4 and Xbox One. It received generally favorable reviews from critics, who praised the gameplay and some calling it the best installment of the series, while its emphasis on microtransactions was criticized. The career mode is titled "The Way Back" and stars Anthony Mackie, Aldis Hodge, Haley Joel Osment, Ginger Gonzaga, Rob Huebel, Mo McRae, Ricky Whittle and Michael Rapaport. "The Way Back" also features authentic CBA commentary in Mandarin Chinese, a first of the series. On December 31, 2020, the online 2K19 servers were shut down.

== Gameplay ==
NBA 2K19, for the seventh time in the series, features MyTeam mode, a mode based around the idea of building the ultimate basketball team, and maintaining a virtual trading card collection. Players build their own custom team, selecting the players, jerseys, logos, coach, court, and other basketball related things, and play with their team in basketball tournament-style competitions against other players' teams. Players collect cards that unlock players, playbooks, and other items that can be used in their team or sold. Players purchase card packs, which give the player random items, with Virtual Currency (VC). Cards are classified by their overall rating, including a new level: Galaxy Opal, which is exclusive to cards with a 99 rating. There's also an all- new type of card called Heat Check, which changes rating depending on the performance of a player in real life. New to MyTeam in NBA 2K19 is the Unlimited mode, where players compete for rewards and participate in a $250,000 tournament for the said cash prize and a trip to the 2019 NBA All-Star Game.

== Development and release ==
NBA 2K19 was officially announced on June 5, 2018, and released on September 11, 2018; players who pre-ordered the 20th Edition of the game received it on September 7, 2018. It was the first game in the series since NBA 2K6 (Xbox 360) and NBA 2K7 (PlayStation 3) to not be released for either platform. It was released for Microsoft Windows, Nintendo Switch, PlayStation 4, Xbox One, iOS, and Android. Giannis Antetokounmpo of the Milwaukee Bucks is the cover athlete for the standard edition version of the game, while LeBron James of the Los Angeles Lakers is the cover athlete for the 20th Anniversary Edition, which includes various physical and digital extras. James was previously the cover athlete of NBA 2K14 for the Standard Edition.

NBA 2K19's soundtrack was curated by rapper Travis Scott, who has five songs featured in the game. The soundtrack offers a wide range of musical artists, such as Lil Uzi Vert, BROCKHAMPTON, PARTYNEXTDOOR, Alison Wonderland, Marshmello, Three Days Grace, Bruno Mars and Cardi B, Migos, Sheck Wes, Black Veil Brides, Fall Out Boy, and more.

== Reception ==
Reception

Aggregate score
Aggregator	Score
Metacritic	(XONE) 83/100 (PS4) 82/100 (NS) 82/100

Review scores
Publication	Score
Electronic Gaming Monthly	7/10
Game Informer	9/10
GameSpot	7/10
IGN	8.5/10
USgamer	4/5

NBA 2K19 received "generally favorable" reviews from critics for Xbox One, PlayStation 4 and Nintendo Switch, according to review aggregator Metacritic.

Electronic Gaming Monthly gave the game 7/10, writing: "NBA 2K19 had a real opportunity to learn from last year's mistakes, and in some ways it did. The Neighborhood is more convenient, the Prelude is way more interesting, and the gameplay has seen some subtle but important improvements. Unfortunately, all this is marred yet again by the game's predatory microtransaction system, which turns the MyCareer stuff into a grind-heavy, pay-to-skip farce."

GameSpot also gave the game 7/10, saying: "Although those willing to grind for everything will eventually get rewarded, the system of VC still comes off as exploitative. But there's a lot of fun to be had in NBA 2K19 despite its flaws, especially if you have a strong love for the sport.

In its 8.5/10 review, IGN wrote, "NBA 2K19's rock-solid gameplay and strong sense of style make it the best of the series, but its style is slightly cramped by microtransactions." Kotaku also criticized the game for pervasive microtransaction demands throughout the game on top of the initial premium price.

The game was nominated for "Best Sports/Racing Game" at The Game Awards 2018, for "Fan Favorite Sports/Racing Game" at the Gamers' Choice Awards, for "Best Sports/Driving Game" at the Titanium Awards, for "Sports, Racing or Fighting Title of the Year" at the Australian Games Awards, for "Song Collection" at the National Academy of Video Game Trade Reviewers Awards, for "Most Promising New eSports Game" at the SXSW Gaming Awards, and for "Best Sport Game" at the Italian Video Game Awards.
