= NBA 2K21 =

2020 video game

- North American cover art for eighth generation consoles featuring Portland Trail Blazers' Damian Lillard
- Developer: Visual Concepts
- Publisher: 2K
- Series: NBA 2K
- Platforms: Windows; Nintendo Switch; PlayStation 4; PlayStation 5; Xbox One; Xbox Series X/S; Stadia; iOS; macOS; tvOS
- Release: Windows, macOS, Nintendo Switch, PlayStation 4, Xbox One, Stadia: WW: September 4, 2020; Xbox Series X/S; November 10, 2020; PlayStation 5 November 12, 2020; Arcade Edition (Apple Arcade); April 2, 2021
- Genre: Sports
- Modes: Single-player, multiplayer

NBA 2K21 is a 2020 basketball video game developed by Visual Concepts and published by 2K. Based on the National Basketball Association (NBA), it is the 22nd installment in the NBA 2K franchise, the successor to NBA 2K20 and the predecessor to NBA 2K22. The game was released on September 4, 2020, for Windows, macOS, Nintendo Switch, PlayStation 4, Xbox One and Google Stadia, and the PlayStation 5 and the Xbox Series X/S versions were released in November 2020, as well as a different version of the main game featuring Zion Williamson of the New Orleans Pelicans. The NBA 2K21 Arcade Edition was released for Apple Arcade on April 2, 2021. Most versions were released to heavy criticism, citing the lack of originality in the gameplay and many microtransactions and bugs.

== Promotion ==
A teaser of the game was released on June 11, 2020, during the PS5 reveal event and featured the player model of New Orleans Pelicans' Zion Williamson. It showed a few seconds of pre-alpha, in-engine footage, and showed many effects, such as ray-tracing and shadow details. On June 30, 2020, NBA 2K announced Damian Lillard, of the Portland Trail Blazers, would be the cover for the standard edition on the previous-generation consoles. On July 1, 2020, NBA 2K announced Zion Williamson as the cover athlete for the standard edition of the next-generation consoles. The last covers were released on July 2, 2020, honoring the late Kobe Bryant. The demo for the game was released on August 24, 2020.

== Gameplay ==
=== MyCareer ===
MyCareer, a major part of the series, returned as one of the available game modes. MyCareer is a career mode in which the player creates their own customizable basketball player and plays through their basketball career. Players may make a male or female player, although female player creation is exclusively available on next-gen consoles. The Neighborhood also returns to MyCareer, as 2K Beach, in which players can customize their wardrobe, get haircuts and tattoos, and purchase boosts. They can also do workouts and run drills to improve their character's attributes at their current team's practice facility. Progress in MyCareer may not carry over across generations, due to some changes made exclusively for next-gen.

=== MyTeam ===
In MyTeam, players collect cards of NBA players (current or past) to put on their team. This game mode has packs (or loot boxes) that can be purchased with Virtual Currency (VC) or My Team Points (MT). Players can also buy cards from each other at the auction house using VC or MT.

==== Ninth generation changes ====
In the next-generation release for the game, The MyCareer online staple The Neighborhood mode was rebranded into The City with the return of affiliations from NBA 2K16. Players start in Rookieville where they play similarly low-leveled players before they can choose an affiliation to enter The City. MyRep, the level system exclusive to The City mode, is shared across all MyPlayer builds, so players only have to level up out of Rookieville once for all their characters. Once a player levels out of Rookieville, they are automatically assigned without choice to one of four of The City's affiliations, ranging from the North Side Knights, South City Vipers, Beasts of the East, and the Western Wildcats. Players are free to switch their affiliation, however they are penalized for doing so by their level being reset down to Pro 1, the same level the player was upon leaving Rookieville. Although the player can play in affiliations that they are not a member of, there is a penalty by reducing the amount of MyRep experience gained in matches. Players can participate in quests given by NPCs, which are either single-player 3v3 games against famous basketball players, or playing games against other MyPlayers in The City. The rewards are typically VC and customizations.

Every affiliation has elections for a Mayor, which are typically community influencers who are responsible for making videos that display in-game, court designs, in-game playlists, design of murals, and uniform selections. Each mayoral term lasts 6 weeks.

=== Franchise mode ===
NBA 2K21 features both MyLeague and MyGM from previous games, where the player can take the helm of a franchise and fully simulate an NBA season while making trades, drafting, and playing games with their teams. Compared to prior titles, eighth-generation console releases of NBA 2K21 were left with little changes for their staple franchise modes, MyLeague and MyGM. Outside of roster changes, the main changes focuses with MyLeague Online where certain users can be given different admin controls. WNBA teams were also given more representation as players were now able to play through a whole season with all 12 teams.

==== Ninth generation changes ====
In the game's Xbox Series X/S and PS5 release, MyGM and MyLeague were combined and rebranded into MyNBA. Instead of the role-playing aspects such as cutscenes, player morale, and tasks being locked solely to MyGM, they are now individually toggleable under role-playing elements before one starts MyNBA. NBA G League games are also playable as well, however playoffs and the championship for the NBA G League are not featured. The boom/bust system was also revamped, giving more unpredictability to draft prospects and young players in terms of how their career will turn out.

== Reception ==
Reception

Aggregate score
Aggregator	Score
Metacritic	NS: 69/100; PC: 67/100; PS4: 68/100; PS5: 79/100; XONE: 67/100; XSX: 80/100

Review scores
Publication	Score
Game Informer	7/10
GameSpot	6/10
Hardcore Gamer	3/5
IGN	6/10 (PS5/XSXS) 7/10
Nintendo Life	8/10
Nintendo World Report	6.5/10
Push Square	7/10

NBA 2K21 received "mixed or average" reviews from critics, according to review aggregator Metacritic, and "generally favorable reviews" on the ninth-generation consoles.

Michael Higham from GameSpot gave the game a score of 6-out-of-10. He states "NBA 2K21 shows that the lone basketball sim we have now has largely stagnated. It's a full package, for sure, but one that demonstrates little-to-no motivation to meaningfully improve upon itself. That doesn't take away from the strong foundation that makes NBA 2K a fun and rewarding time. However, when you go through the same grind and the same process with only superficial changes, you just get burnt out faster than years prior."

Ben Vollmer from IGN gave the game a score of 6 out of 10, stating "More of the same isn't good enough anymore, especially when it includes such obtrusive microtransactions." Vollmer also says "At the same time, it's a shame that 2K's focus isn't on the fun you can have on the court, but instead the money that can be extracted from your wallet off of the court in the MyCareer and MyTeam modes, whist aren't fun to grind through without paying. Maybe the new set of consoles on the horizon will bring a fresh start for the NBA 2K franchise, but right now I feel more pessimistic about the series’ future than ever."

The PlayStation 4 version of NBA 2K21 sold 8,541 physical copies within its first week on sale in Japan, making it the seventh bestselling retail game of the week. The game had sold more than 8 million copies by the end of December 2020.

It was nominated in the category of Best Sports/Racing Game at The Game Awards 2020, as well as Sports Game of the Year at the 24th Annual D.I.C.E. Awards.

== Soundtrack ==
The NBA 2K21 in-game soundtrack uniquely featured songs from cover athlete Damian ‘Dame D.O.L.L.A.’ Lillard, global artists such as Stormzy, Roddy Ricch, Little Simz and more, giving opportunity to independent artists to be featured in connection with United Masters.

=== Current Gen Soundtrack ===
Artist	Song	Other Games
Dame D.O.L.L.A. feat. Snoop Dogg and Derrick Milano	Kobe	
The Weeknd	Blinding Lights	
Jack Harlow	WHATS POPPIN	Fuser(DLC)
Roddy Ricch	Gods Eyes	
Juice WRLD	Let Me Know (I Wonder Why Freestyle)	
Anonymuz ft. Denzel Curry	No Threat	
Lil Baby	Sum 2 Prove	
Stormzy	Bronze	
JACKBOYS, Pop Smoke, Travis Scott	GATTI	
Polo G, Stunna 4 Vegas & NLE Choppa feat. Mike WiLL Made-It	Go Stupid	
A$AP Ferg	Value	EA Sports UFC 4
Little Simz	Venom	
The Strokes	Bad Decisions	Rock Band 4 (DLC)
Pop Smoke	Dior	
Lil Tjay ft. Jay Critch	Ruthless	
J Hus	Fight for Your Right	
CHIKA	CROWN	
Rick Ross ft. D. Wade, Raphael Saadiq & UD	Season Ticket Holder	
YoungBoy Never Broke Again	Red Eye	
Che Lingo	My Block	FIFA 21(Volta)
Tory Lanez	Broke in a Minute	
Lauren Declasse	Evisu	
Ocean Wisdom x P Money	BREATHIN'	
Pure Bathing Culture	Dream the Dare	
Chris Patrick	SWISH	
Jay Critch	Cameras	
Wale feat. Rick Ross & Meek Mill	Routine	EA Sports UFC 4
Calid B. ft. Simba.Got.It	Balling	
Jerreau	SAME TEAM	
Tarik	Don't I?	
Red Cafe	I Want All the Bags	
Boy In Space x unheard	Cold	
Abderly	Racks	
Stix	Any Other Way	
Samwyse	$ & Problems	
Chaz Marcus	Balmain Belt	
Rae Khalil	THEYKNO FREESTYLE	
Malz Monday	How It Is	
ELO	Alarm	
Sage English	3 Pointer	
Black$tar	Game Time	
Erick Lottary	Savage	
Irie Da Brat	Work	
ill Nicky	Photograph	
Zebbo	BALL	
Avidince	Wave	
Ro$$ Mac	A Dub	
Jared Anthony	Mayday	
Flight Gang DraE	Hoop Dreams	
Kap Peezy	The Next	

=== Added Songs ===
On November 12, 2020, rapper 2 Chainz premiered five songs from his upcoming album So Help Me God in the game.

Artist	Song	Other Games
2 Chainz ft. Ty Dolla $ign & Lil Duval	Can't Go For That	
2 Chainz ft. YoungBoy Never Broke Again	Save Me	
2 Chainz ft. Latto	Quarantine Thick	
2 Chainz	Lambo Wrist	
2 Chainz ft. Lil Uzi Vert & Chief Keef	Free Lighter	

=== Next-Gen Soundtrack ===
The Next-Gen soundtrack features 150 different songs, more than 100 songs distributed by UnitedMasters.

Artist	Song	Other Games
Lil Baby Feat. Lil Uzi Vert	Commercial	
Dreamville ft. J.I.D	Big Black Truck	
Digable Planets	Rebirth of Slick (Cool Like Dat)	True Crime: New York City, Forza Horizon 4
Lee Bezel	OFF THE LEASH	
Pop Smoke	Invincible	
CHIKA	INDUSTRY GAMES	
A Tribe Called Quest	Buggin' Out	Dave Mirra Freestyle BMX 2
AG Club	Columbia	
Calid B. ft. Jay Swifta	A.D.E.N.	
Dave	Professor X	
REASON	Show Stop	
Dribble2much	One and Done	
GHSTLY XXVII	Trust	
IDK & Juicy J	SQUARE UP	
James BKS feat. Q-Tip, Idris Elba & Little Simz	New Breed	MLB The Show 22
Jay Critch	Dreams in a Wraith	
Juice WRLD ft. Marshmello	Come & Go	
KILLY	OH NO	
Koteri	Riot	
Lil Wayne ft. Big Sean & Lil Baby	I Do It	
Maniscooler x Kamakaze	Shanghai	
Ocean Wisdom x Ghetts	LOWRIDER	
pineappleCITI	Believe	
Popcaan	Promise	
Rich Brian ft. Guapdad 4000	BALI	
Run The Jewels feat. Greg Nice & DJ Premier	Ooh LA LA	
Russ ft. Rick Ross	GUESS WHAT	
SAINt JHN	All I Want Is a Yacht	
Stormzy	Handsome	
Sky Katz	Back At It	
Tame Impala	Breathe Deeper	
Tame Impala	Lost In Yesterday	
Travis Barker, Wiz Khalifa	Drums Drums Drums	MLB The Show 21
Trampolene	Born Again	
Tyla Yaweh ft. Post Malone	Tommy Lee	
Yinka Diz ft. Calid B and Jay Beato	On God (Prod. Kofi Cooks)	
.shy	Break The News	
2xSammy	Ball Harder	
2xSammy	2 Official	
451	BEST INTEREST	
AB (Antonio Brown) ft. YDtheBest	Home From the N.O. (prod. by Siouyari)	
A.G Roid	ON ME	
Alexander Charles feat. Bij Lincs	These Days	
Alexis Renee	Racks	
Anonymuz	Unless	
Ariaa	661	
Ayo Breeze	OverTime	
B1uan	BETTER	
BK Fire feat dzyre	Armageddon (Remix)	
Bryce Oliver	Living Legend	
Byrd the Voice	Motivation (prod. by Hellyer)	
Chief Armand	Talk Game	
Chosen Music	Summit	
Christof Hunte	Break Time	
CHRYS THOMPSON	Aerials	
Craigy F.	Up Now	
Create the Culture	Don't Want Me Winnin'	
Danny Cisco	daze	
Decarlo Tatum Jr.	On Go	
Dot Cromwell	MOOD	
Dre nello	All Hype	
Edo 100	OVERTIME	
Epthemars	Zoom	
Erick Lottary	Word	
Figuero Jones	Chief Spinner	
First Name Shayne	The Motive	
Fourtee	Talk to Me Nice	
Geechi Da Don	Want It All	
Gene Gray	How You Should (Destiny)	
Glory	That Boy Good	
Hadar Adora	Patience	
Holt	Dance With Me	
Htiekal	Fast Life	
I Am Tonka	I Might Flex	
iivrson	Pressure	
iivrson	Money Callin	
ill Nicky	California	
Iman.	Hello	
iZZE	Porsche Dreams	
JAY VOSS	Take It From Me	
JAY VOSS	They Gonna Follow	
Jaywop	Carousel	
Jevon Alexander	Mamba Mentality	
Josh Dominguez	DOUBT	
KC Carter	Someday	
Kai Ca$h	Ghost	
Kai Ca$h	$tunna	
Kamau Jahad	The Wait	
kj feeds	WORK	
Kruize	LALA LAND	
KUMAR	Fanatic	
KuuL	WIN	
Lando Ameen	KAMS REVENGE	
Lil Nemo	Run It Up	
Loovy.	I DO THIS.	
Loretta Mars	Post Up	
Lstnite	Bando	
Mille Manny	ALL IN	
Neo Sohl	Big Dreams	
Niko Slim	Solitary	
Nique	UP HIGH, DOWN LOW	
Noah Sims	Theatrics	
O Fresh	Hype	
O Fresh	WWW	
Orrin	HARLEY	
OTW Kilo	Juice	
OTW Kilo	Stack That Money	
Ponce De'leioun	Be About It	
Project88icon	Go Viral	
Ron Suno	Ball	
Runup Rico	Life or Death	
SNUBBS	Masked Up	
Solo da Honcho	Black Mamba	
SONNY NITEZ	NO TOMORROW	
Splash Zanotti	VIBRATE HIGH	
Swoosh God	Main Topic	
Tariq Lloyd	You vs. Yourself	
Tariq Lloyd	Championship Rings	
The Royal Waev	Passport	
The Siege	Run for Your Life	
Tizzy Stackz	Red Light	
Trapp Rg	80's	
TRVP BRAZY	Every Season	
Vonchi	Finish Lines	
Vuccini	Watch	
Wes Blanco	Gimmie That	
X Nikko	Rendez-Vous	
Xpress	Keep Ya Head Up	
YSB Tril	Do The Most	
YUNG CORY	Movie	
YUNG CORY	Hustle	
Yurms	I Spy	
Yurms	Back in Action	
Zachary Jordan	Toy	
I.T. Official	China Bulls	
Davante FRE$H	Run Up	
Kiiing Leo	2 Step	
Carl'eone	I Got Next	
Warcub	My World	
CRUEL HEARTS CLUB	HEY COMPADRE	
Remiri	The Rise	
Vinnin	Top of The Game	

=== 2K Beats: The Search ===
2K and UnitedMasters launched their 2K Beats: The Search competition and selected 10 artists to join the NBA 2K21 next gen soundtrack. With over 13,000 submissions, winners were chosen by rapper Jadakiss, Ronnie 2K, producers Murda Beatz and Tay Keith. The ten songs were added with a patch in February 2021.

Artist	Song	Other Games
Delly Everyday	Same Game	
Caleb Isaiah	Legend	
Scotty Valid	UP	
Jupiter Ki	$20Mill	
Zane Smith	24 Hours	
Kayo Porter	Never Miss	
Smoovebeendidit	Hands Tied	
Skippa Da Flippa	Win Again	
10k.Caash	Left Knee	
A1 Illa	Elevating	
