= NBA 2K23 =

2022 video game

- Standard Edition cover art featuring Phoenix Suns' Devin Booker
- Developer: Visual Concepts
- Publisher: 2K
- Series: NBA 2K
- Platforms: Windows; Nintendo Switch; PlayStation 4; PlayStation 5; Xbox One; Xbox Series X/S; Arcade Edition; iOS; macOS; tvOS
- Release: WW: September 9, 2022; Arcade Edition: WW: October 18, 2022
- Genre: Sports
- Modes: Single-player, multiplayer

NBA 2K23 is a 2022 basketball video game developed by Visual Concepts and published by 2K. Based on the National Basketball Association (NBA), it is the 24th installment in the NBA 2K franchise, the successor to NBA 2K22 and the predecessor to NBA 2K24. The game was released on September 9, 2022, for Windows, Nintendo Switch, PlayStation 4, PlayStation 5, Xbox One and Xbox Series X/S. The NBA 2K23 Arcade Edition was released on iOS, macOS and tvOS through Apple Arcade on October 18, 2022. The online servers for the game were shut down on December 31, 2024.

== Cover Athletes ==
Phoenix Suns shooting guard Devin Booker is on the cover of the standard and digital deluxe versions, while NBA Hall Of Famer Michael Jordan is on the cover of the Michael Jordan and Championship Editions. WNBA stars Sue Bird and Diana Taurasi are featured on the WNBA cover edition. The 'Dreamer Edition' has American rapper J. Cole on the cover.

== Jordan Challenge and MyNBA updates ==
For the first time since NBA 2K11, the Jordan Challenge is added. The game parachutes the player back to the year 1982, and the first challenge sees the player undertake a basketball game featuring Michael Jordan.

MyNBA was also updated, allowing the user to begin their MyNBA career during the 1983–84, 1991–92, or 2002–03 NBA seasons. The player can also start in the current 2022–23 NBA season in the games "modern era" selection. The new MyNBA mode includes automatic team relocations such as the Kansas City Kings moving to Sacramento, the Vancouver Grizzlies move to Memphis and the Seattle SuperSonics relocation to Oklahoma City, however the user can veto these moves. The "eras" mode features fully rendered arenas, logos, and jerseys from the 1980s, 1990s, and 2000s, complete historic rosters as well as the draft classes that were previously available in previous NBA 2K games. The mode also includes television filters and broadcast packages that emulate appropriate TV broadcast styles for the specific era the user starts in with the 80s broadcasts package being similar to what the NBA on CBS had in that decade, the 90s broadcasts package being similar to the NBA on NBC package used early in 90s, and the 2000s broadcast package is similar to ESPN broadcasts used in the early 2000s. The 1980s and 90s broadcast packages are also used in the Jordan Challenge mode. In addition to the NBA eras, with them came historical rule changes that allows you to change or add new rules impacting gameplay in the NBA eras, you are able to change or add historical rules during the off-season of the simulation.

== Additional Changes ==
Some more notable changes in NBA 2K23 was the removal of contracts in MyTeam, allowing your players to be able to play unlimited games without needing to continually add contracts, or add a diamond contract to your players to be able to play more games with them. In addition, a new feature added to MyTeam is a mode called Triple Threat Online, allowing you to co-op against up to 3 people on each team.

== Reception ==
Reception

Aggregate score
Aggregator	Score
Metacritic	(PS5) 78/100 (XSXS) 80/100

Review scores
Publication	Score
Famitsu	33/40
Game Informer	7.5/10
GamesRadar+	4/5
Hardcore Gamer	4.5/5
IGN	6/10
Nintendo Life	7/10
Push Square	8/10

NBA 2K23 received "generally favorable" reviews, garnering a 78/100 on PS5 and 80/100 on Xbox according to review aggregator Metacritic.

However, players have slammed the game's microtransactions, stating that it would cost over $100 in VC just to finish building a player, and have also said that the game feels extremely pay-to-win and puts the player at a significant disadvantage if they cannot afford or do not wish to spend extra money to improve their MyCareer player. Players also criticized the fact that the brand-new eras are only available to PS5 and Xbox Series X players, not PS4, Xbox One or PC.

In addition, there have been many complaints by players, particularly on the PS5 and Xbox Series X, about how the frame rate dips and the game lags.

During the 26th Annual D.I.C.E. Awards, the Academy of Interactive Arts & Sciences nominated NBA 2K23 for "Sports Game of the Year".
