= NBA 2K Mobile =

Basketball mobile video game

- Season 6 cover art featuring Donovan Mitchell
- Developer: Cat Daddy Games
- Publisher: 2K Sports
- Series: NBA 2K
- Platforms: iOS, Android
- Release: November 19, 2018
- Genre: Sports
- Modes: Single-player, multiplayer

NBA 2K Mobile is a free to play basketball video game developed by Cat Daddy Games and published by 2K Sports, based on the National Basketball Association, and is a spin-off title of the NBA 2K series. It was officially released on November 19, 2018, for iOS and pre-register for Android.

== Gameplay ==
In NBA 2K Mobile, there are no substitutes during the matches and the only players that can be used are the part of the starting lineup. The matches consist of 2 halves, which may vary depending on the game mode, and each half lasting two minutes. There are two different ways to control the players on the team, auto or manual. In auto mode, the players can still choose when to shoot the ball and attempt to block the opposing player's shot, but are unable to freely move around and the game will still play by itself. In manual, the person playing the game has to control everything in the game, that includes moving, shooting, passing, and defending. Also, unlike many other popular basketball games like NBA 2K, the players have infinite endurance allowing them to run and defend as much as needed. Many of the rules that apply in the NBA apply in NBA 2K Mobile, such as the 24-second shot clock and out-of-bounds.

=== Gamemodes ===
In NBA 2K Mobile, players can choose from different gamemodes such as Crews, Events, Tourneys, and Drills. Crews is an offline PvP mode where you can create a MyPlayer, and play a 3-on-3, 2-on-2 and also 1-on-1 matches against other crews. Tourneys replaced the mode called Seasons, and is a mode where you play a series of best of 4 rounds, and is based on an NBA season, there are different playoff rounds, allowing you to earn different tiers of player cards. Drills allows you to practice doing different kinds of activities including basketball related like 1v1s and 3v3s, and not basketball related like bench press and reaction time, and get rewards for doing them. Events allow you to play different types of gamemodes to get rewards.

=== Shooting ===
When the shoot button is pressed, a bar will appear. Several variables can affect the chance of the ball going in, including the player's rating, the distance from the defenders and the hoop, or timing the shot well by making the bar as filled as possible. If the bar turns yellow, that means that the ball has an increased chance of going in, if the bar turns green, then the shot is guaranteed to go in. The better the player's rating is, the easier it is to time the shot. The shooting efficiency varies from the type of card and its positions, as centers and power forwards have a lower shooting attribute as compared to a shooting guard or a point guard. Specific player cards have an inbuilt advantage for better and more efficient shooting so as to mirror the actual shooting ability of the player in real life.

=== Defending ===
By starting the defend move, the defenders will automatically follow the players they are supposed to guard. If the guarded player passes the ball while the defend button is still pressed, then the defender will automatically switch to the new opposing player that has the ball. If the button wasn't pressed during the pass, the defender will stay with the original player. During the block, the defender will make a move and attempt to block his shot or make it more unlikely for the ball to go in. The taller the defender is, and the better the player's defensive rating is, makes it more unlikely for the opposing player to make the shot. After the steal, the defender will attempt to steal the ball from the opposing player. Sometimes the defender may foul the opposing player, and with enough fouls, the fouled player will shoot two free throws.

=== Power ===
Each player card has a certain amount of power based on its tier and type it belongs to. The average power of all cards on the player's team is the team's power. The team's power determines which opponents it will play against, which cards can be unlocked, and the rewards the player can get from events.

=== Gear ===
Points needed to unlock more attributes boosts for gear.

Gear is used to improve player's attributes. Each player can only have one gear, and different gears can only be specifically used for certain positions and/or teams. There are several different gear tiers, and the higher the tier, the more attributes it can improve. However, in order to be able to get the attribute boost for higher tier gear, the player needs to score a certain number of points with the player card that the gear is attached to, to be able to unlock all the attribute boosts.

=== Upgrading ===
There are currently 43 different tiers of the player cards, affecting the player's power. When there are several cards of the same tier, the player can choose which player card to upgrade. In order to be able to upgrade the card, they have to have the same star level as the card that is being upgraded. To upgrade the player card, the player can either use two different cards of the same tier and star level, or use the exact same card as the one being upgraded. When a card is being upgraded, the card/s used to upgrade the other card will be deleted, and will no longer be able to be used.

=== Training ===
You can see underneath the mentor, the attribute boosts, and the power that it will increase the card by.

When training a card, the power of the card will increase. The maximum level that a card can be trained is level 100. However, to be able to train a card to a certain point, it needs to be at a specific tier, along with the high enough star level. When a card reaches level 100, it can be converted into a mentor, which can help improve a different card's power level, and increase the player's attributes if the card is attached with gear when it is converted. When you make a mentor and teach a card with it for the first time, it is free, but as you teach more cards with it, it will start to cost more and more coins. A card can be trained using either pump-ups, which are made specifically to train cards, other cards, or collectibles. The higher the tier of a pump-up or card, the more it trains the card.

=== Rewind mode ===
In Season 7 of the game, NBA 2K Mobile announced the introduction of the "Rewind" mode, which allows players to recreate historic moments and NBA highlights. When the player succeeds, they are rewarded with prizes used to help upgrade their team.

=== Themes ===
In the game, NBA 2K Mobile also has theme cards, which are released every few weeks. The themes are based on certain events or activities that players are associated with. Each theme usually has around fifteen to twenty players, which are obtainable through packs or specific events. Each theme has a higher power compared to the standard foundation cards, allowing players to get major upgrade boosts to their squad.

== Development ==
Former Cover Featuring Jayson Tatum

NBA 2K Mobile released their game on the App Store and pre-register on Google Play with LeBron James as the cover athlete for Season 1. They promised "Console quality graphics" and "Lifelike NBA 2K action" and praised the games ability to play on the go. Then, on September 5, 2018, NBA 2K Mobile released Season 2 with Zion Williamson as the cover athlete. With this new season, a new gamemode called drills was added, and the player is now able to call screens and double teams in-game. They also released gear, and mentors which could be used to improve player cards. On December 1, 2020, NBA 2K Mobile released Season 3, and partnered with Kevin Durant who was the cover athlete for the game. In this season came the addition of King of the Court, a single-elimination tournament style gamemode event, and additional card themes added like Historic Greats, Holiday, and much more. On September 28, 2021, NBA 2K Mobile released Season 4 with Damian Lillard as the cover athlete. Additional changes to the game this season included a new Courtside Pass, and a new limited-time event called Power Cap having players get a certain number of points for having a certain team power. On October 10, 2023, NBA 2K Mobile released Season 6, featuring Donovan Mitchell as the cover athlete. Changes to the game this season include 3 new tiers, a 1v1 and a 2v2 Crews edition, and updated graphics. They also increased the minimum card tier that the player can get and increased the rewards the player can get from events and draft picks. NBA 2K Mobile accumulates an estimated 1 million dollars and 400 thousand downloads monthly with a total of over 41 million downloads, and has been rapidly gaining popularity making double the amount of revenue and nearly double the number of downloads in the last month.

== Reception ==
NBA 2K Mobile has received favorable reviews. Giorgio Melani from Multiplayer.it praised the graphics as "simply impressive", citing the scalability between the performance and complexity with the power of the device's hardware. Melani thought of the achievements in terms of quality as truly remarkable, and found the style aiming to be realistic without many simplifications. The auto mode has been criticized, with Harry Slater from Pocket Gamer noting that it is easier to play with, achieving better results than the player would by manually controlling the teams.
