= Bob Fitzgerald =

American sports broadcaster

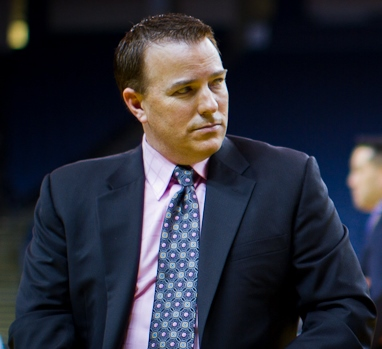
- Fitzgerald in 2011
- Born: Robert James Fitzgerald; 1966 (age 59–60); Chicago, Illinois, U.S.
- Years active: 1993–present
- Spouse: Carol Kenney (m. 1990; died 2016)
- Children: 3
- Sports commentary career
- Team: Golden State Warriors
- Genre: Play-by-play
- Sport: Basketball

Robert James Fitzgerald (born May 14, 1966) is an American sports broadcaster who is currently the TV play-by-play announcer for the NBA's Golden State Warriors on NBC Sports Bay Area and was a co-host of the radio talk show Fitz and Brooks on KNBR with Rod Brooks.

== Biography ==
=== Education ===
Born in Chicago, Fitzgerald moved to Foster City at age six in 1972. Fitzgerald graduated from Serra High School in nearby San Mateo and the University of Notre Dame. Fitzgerald also earned a master's degree in sports management from Ohio State University. While at Notre Dame, he worked as a play-by-play broadcaster for Fighting Irish football and basketball on campus radio station WVFI.

=== KNBR ===
Fitzgerald gained notoriety on KNBR as the host of the 8:00 p.m. - 12:00 a.m. sports talk show, “Sportsphone 680."

Fitzgerald was a co-host of the Fitz and Brooks show from 1:00 to 3:00 p.m. on KNBR 680.

=== Golden State Warriors ===
Fitzgerald is currently in his 24th season as television play-by-play announcer for the Golden State Warriors. In addition to announcing 71 Warriors games on NBC Sports Bay Area, Fitzgerald also continues to maintain an active role on the "Warriors Weekly Roundtable" and postgame radio shows throughout the basketball season. Since his arrival, the Warriors broadcast team, including color commentator Jim Barnett, has received 12 nominations and won two Emmys for "Best Live Sports Broadcast," the initial two for the organization. Fitzgerald has previously received six Emmy nominations for "Best On-Camera" and was awarded the Emmy for "Best On-Camera, Play-by-Play Sports" for Northern California in 2007 and 2014.

Fitzgerald also spent six years as the play-by-play voice for Sega Sports and ESPN's NBA Basketball (now NBA 2K) video game series.

=== Olympics broadcasts ===
Fitzgerald has over 20 years of experience broadcasting Olympic sports. He was the play-by-play basketball announcer covering the London 2012 Summer Olympics for NBC Sports and called NBC Sports coverage of water polo at the Beijing 2008 Summer Olympics. Fitzgerald was the radio broadcaster covering basketball at the Athens 2004 Summer Olympics and also called swimming at the Atlanta 1996 Summer Olympics.

=== NFL broadcasts ===
Fitzgerald has called National Football League games for the Westwood One and Sports USA radio networks. He currently handles San Francisco 49ers preseason broadcasts and served as the play-by-play voice for the Arena Football League's San Jose SaberCats, an organization which is now defunct.

=== NBA playoffs ===
Fitzgerald was selected to be a play-by-play announcer for TNT and NBA TV's first round coverage of the 2020 NBA playoffs; he worked with Jim Jackson.
