= NBA Playgrounds =

2017 video game

- Cover art featuring Allen Iverson
- Developer: Saber Interactive
- Publisher: Mad Dog Games
- Series: NBA 2K; Playground Sports
- Engine: Unreal Engine 4
- Platforms: Microsoft Windows; Nintendo Switch; PlayStation 4 Xbox One
- Release: May 9, 2017
- Genre: Sports
- Modes: Single-player, Multiplayer

NBA Playgrounds is a 2017 sports video game developed by Saber Interactive and published by Mad Dog Games for the Nintendo Switch, PlayStation 4, Xbox One, and for Microsoft Windows, and is a spin-off title of the NBA 2K series published by 2K and a part of the Playground Sports series. Bearing similarities to previous related titles such as NBA Jam and NBA Street, NBA Playgrounds is an arcade-style basketball game officially licensed by the National Basketball Association.

== Gameplay ==
NBA Playgrounds includes a roster of both active and former NBA stars. Both local and online multiplayer modes are included in the game, although local mode requires an internet connection to function on PS4.

Players fill up a roster of players by playing different modes to earn packs. In Tournament Mode, players play four games with challenges with each iteration. Once the tournament is completed, players unlock a court and a gold pack. There is an online mode and exhibition, where players can play to upgrade themselves to bronze, silver, and gold. Players can also get a pack for leveling up both their offline level and their online level. If a player wanted to simply have all of the players right away, he/she could pay for the game's complete roster.

== Release ==
Online features were not ready at launch day for the Nintendo Switch version due to technical issues, with a promise from the developer who said it would be ready in a few days. Despite this, Nintendo Switch online services were still not operating two weeks past the launch date. Saber Interactive, developers of the game, announced on July 1 that players who purchased the game before the implementation of online service would receive a copy of Shaq Fu: A Legend Reborn. Online features arrived on the Nintendo Switch with the next update in the following month along with extra content. Additional free content was added later in the summer.

On October 4, 2017, Saber Interactive released the game's first DLC pack, titled "Hot 'N Frosty." The DLC introduces three new courts with their own tournament and single-player mode.

On January 4, 2018, Saber Interactive launched NBA Playgrounds: Enhanced Edition for the Nintendo Switch, superseding the original launch version on the Nintendo eShop. The Enhanced Edition included all previous game updates, 100 additional NBA players, and a three-point shooting mode. Additionally, the Enhanced Edition includes various technical fixes. Because of this, the Enhanced Edition is a separate download rather than a patch for the launch version. Players who purchased the launch version can download the Enhanced Edition for free and can transfer their save files to it before deleting the old version. Saber Interactive celebrated the launch of the Enhanced Edition with a 50% sale.

== Reception ==
Reception

Aggregate score
Aggregator	Score
Metacritic	(PS4) 68/100 (PC) 67/100 (XONE) 66/100 (NS) 63/100

Review scores
Publication	Score
GameSpot	6/10
IGN	7.4/10
Nintendo Life	7/10

NBA Playgrounds received a largely mixed critical reception, earning a 6/10 from GameSpot and a 7.4/10 from IGN.

Nintendo Life gave the title a 7/10, praising the online and local multiplayer gameplay, but criticized the slow pace of the single-player mode and poor odds of card packs. They recommended the game only for the Nintendo Switch as it is the only basketball title available for the platform at the time.

By July 2017, the game sold 500,000 units across all platforms. It was nominated for "Game, Original Sports" at the National Academy of Video Game Trade Reviewers Awards.

== Sequel ==
A sequel, NBA 2K Playgrounds 2, which was published by 2K Sports, was announced in July 2018. In May 2018, NBA Playgrounds 2 was delayed past its original release date of May 22, 2018. The release date was later pushed back to October 16, 2018, for PlayStation 4, Xbox One, Nintendo Switch and Microsoft Windows.
