= NBA 2K =

Video game series

- Genre: Sports (basketball)
- Developers: Visual Concepts; Saber Interactive (Playgrounds 2); Cat Daddy Games (MyNBA2K companion app, Mobile and SuperCard)
- Publishers: Sega (1999–2004); 2K (2005–present)
- Platforms: Dreamcast; PlayStation; PlayStation 2 Xbox; GameCube; Xbox 360; PlayStation 3 Microsoft Windows; PlayStation Portable; Wii; Android iOS macOS; Wii U Xbox One; PlayStation 4 Nintendo Switch; Stadia; PlayStation 5 Xbox Series X/S; Nintendo Switch 2
- First release: NBA 2K; November 11, 1999
- Latest release: NBA 2K27; September 4, 2026

NBA 2K is an American series of basketball sports simulation video games developed by Visual Concepts and released annually since 1999. The premise of the series is to emulate the sport of basketball and the National Basketball Association.

The series was originally published by Sega. Beginning with 2005's NBA 2K6, the series is currently published by 2K (previously under the 2K Sports sub-label). As of 2026, the series consists of 27 main installments and several spinoff titles across eighteen different platforms. An official eSports league, the NBA 2K League, launched in 2018.

Until 2018, the series' primary rival was the NBA Live series published by EA Sports.

Since 2024, with the release of NBA 2K25, the series' tagline is "Ball Over Everything".

== Gameplay ==
Each installment in the NBA 2K series emulates the National Basketball Association, and present slight improvements over the previous installments. As such, gameplay simulates a typical game of basketball, with the player controlling an entire team or a select player; objectives coincide with the rules of basketball and presentation resembles actual televised NBA games. Various game modes have been featured in the series, allowing for gameplay variety. Numerous elements of the games feature customizable options. Each game features the teams and players from the current NBA season; historic NBA teams and players have also been featured, as have EuroLeague teams and (starting with NBA 2K20) WNBA teams. NBA 2K21 expanded WNBA integration with The W, a dedicated career mode allowing players to create a WNBA My PLAYER and compete across all 12 teams. Fictional players and teams can also be created and compiled.

A staple of the series is its career mode, which has been described as a sports-themed role-playing game. ESPN NBA Basketball was the first game in the series to feature such a mode, but it wasn't until NBA 2K10 and its successors that the mode became a more integral part of the series. The mode was initially titled 24/7, before being changed to MyPlayer, and settling on MyCareer. The modes center on the basketball career of the player's created player; the player customizes several aspects of their player and plays through their career in the NBA. Key events in the player's career are depicted, such as the draft and their retirement ceremony. A storyline is often present in the modes, and high school- and college-level basketball has also been depicted. The player upgrades their player's attributes as they play, and can participate in off-court activities.

Another mainstay of the series is a mode allowing the player to assume control of an NBA franchise, acting as a general manager. The mode has been featured in numerous NBA 2K games and is often titled Association; the most recent games in the series feature the MyGM and MyLeague modes. In the modes, the player controls virtually all aspects of a team, rather than just playing games with the team. As the player simulates through seasons, they must satisfy the needs of the team's personnel and the owner.

MyTeam mode, which was introduced in NBA 2K13, focuses on building a team of players and competing against other players' teams online. The player's primary venue for acquiring players for their team is card packs; the player purchases a card pack, which features random items the player can use in the mode, including players. In addition to compiling a select group of players, the player can also customize their team's jerseys and court, among other things. The game mode progressed even further on NBA 2K19, with a MyTeam tournament between the best Xbox and PS4 players for a prize of $250,000 occurring. Other online-focused modes have also been featured in the series, such as Pro-Am, which focuses on players building a team together with their custom players.

In addition to regulation NBA, street basketball has been featured in numerous games in the series. Created players and real players can be used in such modes; additionally, some celebrities have made appearances as playable characters in the series. In more recent games, the street basketball modes are titled Blacktop and MyPark. Blacktop is structured in the typical style of street basketball. MyPark consists of an open area filled with players who can join different games on different courts. Several games in the series feature a mode which allows the player to hold a slam dunk contest.

Several games in the series have featured game modes that are exclusive to that particular game. NBA 2K11 featured the Jordan Challenge mode, in which players are tasked with recreating some of Michael Jordan's most memorable feats, such as scoring 69 points in a single game. NBA 2K12 featured the NBA's Greatest mode, where the player can play with past NBA players, such as Kareem Abdul-Jabbar, Julius Erving, and Bill Russell. The PlayStation 3, Xbox 360, and Microsoft Windows versions of NBA 2K14 featured a mode titled Path to Greatness; similar to the Jordan Challenge mode, it focuses on the career of LeBron James.

== Games ==
Release timeline
1999	NBA 2K
2000	NBA 2K1
2001	NBA 2K2
2002	NBA 2K3
2003	ESPN NBA Basketball
2004	ESPN NBA 2K5
2005	NBA 2K6
2006	NBA 2K7
2007	NBA 2K8
2008	NBA 2K Online
2008	NBA 2K9
2009	NBA 2K10
2010	NBA 2K11
2011	NBA 2K12
2012	NBA 2K13
2013	NBA 2K14
2014	NBA 2K15
2015	NBA 2K16
2016	NBA 2K17
2016	NBA 2KVR Experience
2017	NBA Playgrounds
2017	NBA 2K18
2018	NBA 2K Online 2
2018	NBA 2K19
2018	NBA 2K Playgrounds 2
2018	NBA 2K Mobile
2019	NBA 2K20
2020	NBA 2K21
2021	NBA 2K22
2022	NBA 2K23
2023	NBA 2K24
2023	NBA 2K24 MyTEAM Mobile
2024	NBA 2K25
2024	NBA 2K25 MyTEAM Mobile
2025	NBA 2K All Star
2025	NBA 2K26
2025	NBA 2K26 MyTEAM Mobile
2026	NBA 2K27

All twenty-four of the series main installments have been developed by Visual Concepts. The first six games were published by Sega Sports, before the company sold Visual Concepts to Take Two Interactive, thus forming 2K Sports.

=== 1990s ===
==== NBA 2K ====
The original NBA 2K game was initially released in November 1999 for the Dreamcast, featuring Allen Iverson of the Philadelphia 76ers as the cover athlete. The first four games in the NBA 2K series feature commentary from fictional announcers Bob Steele and Rod West, portrayed by Bob Fitzgerald and Rod Brooks, respectively.

=== 2000s ===
==== NBA 2K1 ====
NBA 2K1 was initially released in October 2000 for the Dreamcast. Allen Iverson of the Philadelphia 76ers returns as the cover athlete. NBA 2K1, among other things, introduces a mode which focuses on street basketball, and a mode which allows the player to act as the general manager of a team; most of the game's successors feature variations of the two modes. This was also the first game in the series to allow for online play, allowing for 8 people to play together online.

==== NBA 2K2 ====
NBA 2K2 was released in late 2001 and early 2002 for Dreamcast, PlayStation 2, Xbox, and GameCube. Allen Iverson again returned as the cover athlete. In addition to the regular players and teams from the 2001–02 NBA season, NBA 2K2 features several past players and their respective teams, including Bill Russell, Julius Erving, Magic Johnson, and Larry Bird. NBA 2K2 is the first game in the series to be released for multiple platforms, and the last to be released for Dreamcast.

==== NBA 2K3 ====
NBA 2K3 was initially released in October 2002 for PlayStation 2, Xbox, and GameCube. It is the second and final time of the game in the series to be released for the GameCube and the first game to have ESPN branding. Allen Iverson of the 76ers made his fourth appearance as the cover athlete.

==== ESPN NBA Basketball (NBA 2K4) ====
ESPN NBA Basketball was released in October and November 2003 for the PlayStation 2 and Xbox consoles. Allen Iverson made his fifth and final appearance as the cover athlete. The game introduces a 24/7 mode, a career mode in which the player can create a customizable character and use them to compete in basketball tournaments and other competitions. Online game modes are also present, and each player has a unique facial design, also a first. The game features a commentary team consisting of Bob Fitzgerald and Tom Tolbert; Kevin Frazier hosts pre-game shows. It is the only game in the series to not feature "2K" in the title.

==== ESPN NBA 2K5 ====
ESPN NBA 2K5 was first released in September 2004 for PlayStation 2 and Xbox. It is the last game in the series to be published by Sega Sports before the company sold Visual Concepts to Take Two Interactive, forming 2K Sports. Ben Wallace of the Detroit Pistons replaced Iverson as the cover athlete. It is the third and final in the series to feature ESPN branding. The game features Stuart Scott as a presenter, Bob Fitzgerald as a play-by-play commentator, Bill Walton as a second commentator, Michele Tafoya as a sideline reporter.

==== NBA 2K6 ====
NBA 2K6 was initially released in September 2005 for PlayStation 2, Xbox, and, for the first time, Xbox 360. It is the first game in the series to be published by 2K Sports. Shaquille O'Neal of the Miami Heat serves as the game's cover athlete; he was also involved in some of the game's motion capture development. In NBA 2K6, Kevin Harlan is the play-by-play commentator, Kenny Smith is the color commentator, and Craig Sager is the sideline reporter. The next two installments in the series feature the same team.

==== NBA 2K7 ====
NBA 2K7 was initially released in September 2006 for the PlayStation 2, PlayStation 3, Xbox, and Xbox 360. It is the first game in the series to be released for the PlayStation 3 and the last to be released for the original Xbox. O'Neal returns as the cover athlete. NBA 2K7 is the first game in the series to feature a licensed soundtrack; the previous games featured music produced exclusively for the games. The soundtrack, which was compiled by Dan the Automator, consists of 13 songs, and was also released in CD format as Dan the Automator Presents 2K7.

==== NBA 2K8 ====
NBA 2K8 was initially released in October 2007 for PlayStation 2, PlayStation 3, and Xbox 360. Chris Paul is the game's cover athlete. The game introduces the Slam Dunk Contest game mode. The soundtrack consists of 23 licensed songs.

==== NBA 2K Online ====
In June 2008, 2K Sports announced that they were partnering with Tencent to release an online version of NBA 2K for the Chinese market. Since then the game has expanded to other markets in Asia.

==== NBA 2K9 ====
NBA 2K9 was initially released in October 2008 for PlayStation 2, PlayStation 3, Xbox 360, and, for the first time in the series, Microsoft Windows. Kevin Garnett is featured as the game's cover athlete. The commentary team consists of Harlan and Clark Kellogg, with Cheryl Miller serving as sideline reporter. The soundtrack consists of 24 licensed songs and one original song.

==== NBA 2K10 ====
NBA 2K10 was initially released in October 2009 for PlayStation 2, PlayStation 3, PlayStation Portable (a first), Xbox 360, Microsoft Windows, and Nintendo Wii (also a first). It is the first game since NBA 2K3 to be released on a Nintendo platform. Kobe Bryant(LAL) is the game's cover athlete. Fans were able to vote for which image they favored out of four to be used on the cover. The game features a reincarnated career mode titled MyPlayer, which would become a staple of the future games in the series, later being retitled as MyCareer. Harlan and Kellogg return as commentators, while Doris Burke replaces Miller as sideline reporter. The licensed soundtrack consists of 30 songs. In addition to the standard release, a limited-edition version of the game, titled NBA 2K10: Anniversary Edition, was also released; it included several bonuses, such as a Bryant figurine manufactured by McFarlane Toys. A demo of sorts was released on PlayStation Network and Xbox Live prior to the release of the main game in August 2009, titled NBA 2K10 Draft Combine. It features Derrick Rose as its cover athlete and allows the player to compete in activities related to the main game's MyPlayer mode.

=== 2010s ===
==== NBA 2K11 ====
NBA 2K11 was released in October 2010 for PlayStation 2, PlayStation 3, PlayStation Portable, Xbox 360, Nintendo Wii, and Microsoft Windows. Michael Jordan is the game's cover athlete, and the game features several modes focusing on Jordan. One such mode is "The Jordan Challenge", a mode in which the player must recreate ten of Jordan's most memorable career achievements, such as scoring 69 points in a game. NBA 2K11 also introduces historic NBA teams and players. The game features the same presenters as NBA 2K10. The soundtrack consists of 27 licensed songs.

==== NBA 2K12 ====
NBA 2K12 was released in October 2011 for PlayStation 2, PlayStation 3, PlayStation Portable, Xbox 360, Nintendo Wii, Microsoft Windows, and, for the first time, iOS. This was the final game to be released for the PlayStation 2. With three different covers, NBA 2K12 is the first game in the series to feature multiple cover athletes. The cover athletes are Magic Johnson, Larry Bird, and Michael Jordan (for the second straight year). The game introduces the "NBA's Greatest" mode, where players use a wide range of historic players and teams. Steve Kerr joins Harlan and Kellogg in the commentary booth, and Burke returns as sideline reporter. The same team is present in the next three games in the series. A demo of NBA 2K12 was released prior to the release of the main game. The soundtrack consists of 28 licensed songs. Regarding the soundtrack, a contest was held, the winners of which would contribute to the soundtrack with an original song.

==== NBA 2K13 ====
NBA 2K13 was initially released in September/October 2012 for PlayStation 3, PlayStation Portable, Xbox 360, Nintendo Wii, iOS, Android, and Microsoft Windows. It was the final game to be released on the PlayStation Portable and Wii. A version for Wii U was released as a launch title in November 2012 and in PAL regions the following month. The game's cover features Blake Griffin, Kevin Durant, and Derrick Rose. MyTeam makes its debut in NBA 2K13, the mode focuses on building your very own fantasy team and compete against other people. Jay Z is credited as executive producer of the game; among other things, he curated the soundtrack, which consists of 24 songs.

==== NBA 2K14 ====
NBA 2K14 was initially released in October and November 2013 for PlayStation 3, PlayStation 4, Xbox 360, Xbox One, Microsoft Windows, iOS, and Android. LeBron James serves as cover athlete; he also curated the soundtrack, which features 20 licensed songs. NBA 2K14 introduces EuroLeague teams. NBA 2K14 was also the first year they introduced "The Park" as an additional mode to take your MyPlayer to the streets along with other users and play with them on a variety of courts.

==== NBA 2K15 ====
NBA 2K15 was initially released in October 2014 for PlayStation 3, PlayStation 4, Xbox 360, Xbox One, Microsoft Windows, Android, and iOS. Kevin Durant serves as the cover athlete. NBA 2K15 introduces pre-game shows presented by Ernie Johnson and Shaquille O'Neal. One new feature concerns player creation; the player is now able to scan their own face into the game. The soundtrack, which consists of 27 licensed songs, was curated by Pharrell Williams.

==== NBA 2K16 ====
NBA 2K16 was released worldwide on September 29, 2015, for PlayStation 3, PlayStation 4, Xbox 360, Xbox One, and Microsoft Windows. A version for Android and iOS was released on October 14, 2015. The game features seven different covers with eight cover athletes: Stephen Curry, James Harden, Anthony Davis, Michael Jordan, Pau Gasol and Marc Gasol, Dennis Schröder, and Tony Parker. NBA 2K16's mid-game commentary team remains the same, except Kerr has been replaced by Greg Anthony. The pre-game, halftime, and post-game shows now feature the returning Kenny Smith, in addition to Johnson and O'Neal. Director Spike Lee worked on the MyCareer mode. The soundtrack, which features 50 songs, was curated by DJ Khaled, DJ Premier, and DJ Mustard. A companion app featuring Paul George and developed by Cat Daddy Games was released alongside the game.

==== NBA 2K17 ====
NBA 2K17 was released worldwide in September 2016 for PlayStation 3, PlayStation 4, Xbox 360, Xbox One, Microsoft Windows, Android, and iOS. The game features four different cover athletes, Paul George, Kobe Bryant, Danilo Gallinari, and Pau Gasol. NBA 2K17 still features a three-person commentary team and one sideline reporter, but the personnel has been overhauled. Seven different commentators are present, namely Kevin Harlan, Clark Kellogg, Greg Anthony, Brent Barry, Chris Webber, and Steve Smith, while David Aldridge replaces Burke as sideline reporter. The pre-game, halftime, and post-game presentation trio remains unchanged. The game's soundtrack was compiled by Michael B. Jordan, Grimes, Imagine Dragons, and Noah Shebib, and features 50 songs. A demo of sorts, titled The Prelude, was released prior to the release of the main game. A companion app featuring Karl-Anthony Towns was also released.

==== NBA 2KVR Experience ====
On November 22, 2016, a virtual reality NBA 2K title was released. Titled NBA 2KVR Experience, the game is a collection of basketball mini-games and is not part of the main series, but a spin-off title. It is available for PlayStation VR, HTC Vive, Oculus Rift, and Samsung Gear VR and the user plays as LeBron James. This title uses Unreal Engine 4.

==== NBA Playgrounds ====
NBA Playgrounds was released on May 9, 2017.

==== NBA 2K18 ====
NBA 2K18 was released in September 2017. It is the first game in the series to be released for the Nintendo Switch; it was also released for PlayStation 3, PlayStation 4, Xbox 360, Xbox One, Android, iOS, and Microsoft Windows. Kyrie Irving is the cover athlete. The Legend Edition/Legend Edition Gold versions of the game, which include various physical and digital extras, features Shaquille O'Neal as the cover athlete. The Canadian version of the game features DeMar DeRozan of the Toronto Raptors as its cover athlete. The Nike Connect Special Edition for the game features Kevin Durant of the Golden State Warriors as the cover. The Neighborhood makes its debut in NBA 2K18. The game's soundtrack consists of 49 licensed songs. Kobe Bryant and Kevin Garnett appear as guest commentators. NBA 2K18 adds seventeen new classic teams as well as an 'All-Time Team' for each franchise. This was also the last game to be released for the PlayStation 3 and Xbox 360.

==== NBA 2K Online 2 ====
NBA 2K Online 2 is the second release of the title focusing on the Asian market.

==== NBA 2K19 ====
NBA 2K19 was released on September 11, 2018, while the 20th Anniversary Edition (which was one year away), featuring the cover athlete LeBron James, was released on September 7, the same day as the release of NBA Live 19. This game marks the first time that a version of the game was not made for the PlayStation 3 or Xbox 360 since those consoles released. The game's standard edition cover athlete is Giannis Antetokounmpo of the Milwaukee Bucks, while the cover athlete for the Australian and New Zealand version of the game is Ben Simmons of the Philadelphia 76ers. In addition, Kobe Bryant and Kevin Garnett both return as guest commentators, with analyst Bill Simmons being added to the announcer roster.

==== NBA 2K Playgrounds 2 ====
NBA 2K Playgrounds 2 was released on October 16, 2018.

==== NBA 2K Mobile ====
NBA 2K Mobile was released in November 2018 for iOS and Android. The game was developed by Cat Daddy Games.

==== NBA 2K20 ====
NBA 2K20 was released on September 6, 2019. The game's standard and deluxe editions' cover athletes are Anthony Davis of the Los Angeles Lakers, while the cover athlete for the Legend Edition is a former Miami Heat player Dwyane Wade, who played for MIA in 2003–2016, 2018–2019.

It is also the first game in the series to include all 12 WNBA teams.

The guest commentator roster of Kobe Bryant, Kevin Garnett, and Bill Simmons all return for 2K20. Following Bryant's death, he was removed from the roster, leaving Garnett and Simmons.

=== 2020s ===
==== NBA 2K21 ====
NBA 2K21 was released on September 4, 2020. The cover athlete for the standard edition on the current console generation is Damian Lillard. Zion Williamson is the cover athlete for the standard version of the next console generation, and Kobe Bryant is the cover athlete for the Legend Edition cover for both console generations. The Arcade Edition was released for Apple Arcade on April 2, 2021. This was also the debut for Brian Anderson in the NBA 2K series.

==== NBA 2K22 ====
NBA 2K22 was released on September 10, 2021. The cover athlete for the standard edition is Luka Dončić. with Candace Parker featured on the WNBA 25th Anniversary Edition and Kareem Abdul-Jabbar, Dirk Nowitzki and Kevin Durant on the NBA 75th Anniversary Edition. The Arcade Edition was released for Apple Arcade on October 19, 2021.

==== NBA 2K23 ====
NBA 2K23 was released on September 9, 2022. The primary cover athlete for the standard and Digital Deluxe Edition is Devin Booker of the Phoenix Suns, while the cover athlete for the Michael Jordan Edition and Championship Edition is Michael Jordan. The game reintroduces the "Jordan Challenges" from NBA 2K11. The Arcade Edition was released for Apple Arcade on October 18, 2022.

==== NBA 2K24 ====
NBA 2K24 was released on September 8, 2023. You can participate in games, upgrade your player's skills, and make decisions that shape their journey. The game introduces the "Mamba Moments". This was also the first game in the series to offer crossplay between Xbox and PlayStation. The Arcade Edition was released for Apple Arcade on October 24, 2023.

NBA 2K24 MyTEAM Mobile

NBA 2K24 MyTEAM Mobile was released in December 2023.

==== NBA 2K25 ====
NBA 2K25 was released on September 4, 2024. The cover athletes are Jayson Tatum and A'ja Wilson.

NBA 2K25 MyTEAM Mobile

NBA 2K25 MyTEAM Mobile was released on November 29, 2024.

==== NBA 2K All Star ====
NBA 2K All Star is a mobile game developed by 2K Sports and published by Tencent, primarily targeting the Chinese market. The game is basically the mobile version of NBA 2K Online 2, it was released on March 25, 2025.

==== NBA 2K26 ====
NBA 2K26 was announced on July 8, 2025. The cover athletes are Shai Gilgeous-Alexander and Angel Reese. It was released on September 5, 2025. The games introduced ProPlay Motion technology, incorporating new animation systems intended to produce smoother and more responsive gameplay.

NBA 2K26 MyTEAM Mobile

NBA 2K26 MyTEAM Mobile was released on November 28, 2025.

==== NBA 2K27 ====
NBA 2K27 was announced on July 28, 2026. The cover athletes are Victor Wembanyama, Caitlin Clark, Derrick Rose, and Bam Adebayo across the Standard, Deluxe, Ultra, and Vice City Editions with the latter to mark the promotion for Grand Theft Auto VI. It was announced for release on September 4, 2026. The game expanded upon the ProPLAY animation system with improved AI defense, a dynamic Dunk Meter, expanded MyPLAYER customization, and new features across MyTEAM, MyNBA, and MyCAREER.

== Cover athletes ==
List of standard cover athletes
Game	Cover star	
Game	Name	Team
NBA 2K	Allen Iverson	Philadelphia 76ers
NBA 2K1	Allen Iverson	Philadelphia 76ers
NBA 2K2	Allen Iverson	Philadelphia 76ers
NBA 2K3	Allen Iverson	Philadelphia 76ers
ESPN NBA Basketball 2K4	Allen Iverson	Philadelphia 76ers
ESPN NBA 2K5	Ben Wallace	Detroit Pistons
NBA 2K6	Shaquille O'Neal	Miami Heat
NBA 2K7	Shaquille O'Neal	Miami Heat
NBA 2K8	Chris Paul	New Orleans Hornets
NBA 2K9	Kevin Garnett	Boston Celtics
NBA 2K10	Kobe Bryant	Los Angeles Lakers
NBA 2K11	Michael Jordan	Chicago Bulls
NBA 2K12	Michael Jordan	Chicago Bulls
NBA 2K12	Larry Bird	Boston Celtics
NBA 2K12	Magic Johnson	Los Angeles Lakers
NBA 2K13	Derrick Rose	Chicago Bulls
NBA 2K13	Blake Griffin	Los Angeles Clippers
NBA 2K13	Kevin Durant	Oklahoma City Thunder
NBA 2K14	LeBron James	Miami Heat
NBA 2K15	Kevin Durant	Oklahoma City Thunder
NBA 2K16	Stephen Curry	Golden State Warriors
NBA 2K16	James Harden	Houston Rockets
NBA 2K16	Anthony Davis	New Orleans Pelicans
NBA 2K17	Paul George	Indiana Pacers
NBA 2K18	Kyrie Irving	Boston Celtics (Note: Irving was a member of the Cleveland Cavaliers when this cover was revealed. He was traded to the Celtics before the game was released and the Cavaliers cover was changed to the Celtics cover shortly after release.)
NBA 2K19	Giannis Antetokounmpo	Milwaukee Bucks
NBA 2K20	Anthony Davis	Los Angeles Lakers
NBA 2K21	Damian Lillard	Portland Trail Blazers
NBA 2K21	Zion Williamson	New Orleans Pelicans
NBA 2K22	Luka Dončić	Dallas Mavericks
NBA 2K23	Devin Booker	Phoenix Suns
NBA 2K24	Kobe Bryant	Los Angeles Lakers
NBA 2K25	Jayson Tatum	Boston Celtics
NBA 2K26	Shai Gilgeous-Alexander	Oklahoma City Thunder
NBA 2K27	Victor Wembanyama	San Antonio Spurs

List of special edition cover athletes
Game	Cover star		
Game	Name	Team	Version
NBA 2K16	Michael Jordan	Chicago Bulls	Michael Jordan Special Edition
NBA 2K16	Pau Gasol	Chicago Bulls	Spain
NBA 2K16	Marc Gasol	Memphis Grizzlies	Spain
NBA 2K16	Dennis Schröder	Atlanta Hawks	Germany
NBA 2K16	Tony Parker	San Antonio Spurs	France
NBA 2K17	Kobe Bryant	Los Angeles Lakers	Legend and Legend Gold
NBA 2K17	Pau Gasol	San Antonio Spurs	Spain
NBA 2K17	Danilo Gallinari	Denver Nuggets	Italy
NBA 2K18	Shaquille O'Neal	Miami Heat	Legend
NBA 2K18	Shaquille O'Neal	Los Angeles Lakers	Legend Gold
NBA 2K18	DeMar DeRozan	Toronto Raptors	Canada
NBA 2K18	Kevin Durant	Golden State Warriors	Nike Connect
NBA 2K19	LeBron James	Los Angeles Lakers	20th Anniversary Edition
NBA 2K19	Ben Simmons	Philadelphia 76ers	Australia and New Zealand
NBA 2K20	Dwyane Wade	Miami Heat	Legend
NBA 2K21	Kobe Bryant	Los Angeles Lakers	Mamba Forever Edition
NBA 2K22	Candace Parker	Chicago Sky	WNBA 25th Anniversary Edition
NBA 2K22	Kevin Durant	Brooklyn Nets	NBA 75th Anniversary Edition
NBA 2K22	Dirk Nowitzki	Dallas Mavericks	NBA 75th Anniversary Edition
NBA 2K22	Kareem Abdul-Jabbar	Los Angeles Lakers	NBA 75th Anniversary Edition
NBA 2K22	Rui Hachimura	Washington Wizards	Japan
NBA 2K23	Michael Jordan	Chicago Bulls	Michael Jordan and Championship Edition
NBA 2K23	Diana Taurasi	Phoenix Mercury	WNBA Edition
NBA 2K23	Sue Bird	Seattle Storm	WNBA Edition
NBA 2K23	J. Cole	N/A	DREAMER Edition
NBA 2K24	Kobe Bryant	Los Angeles Lakers	Kobe Bryant and Black Mamba Edition
NBA 2K24	Sabrina Ionescu	New York Liberty	WNBA Edition
NBA 2K24	Allen Iverson	Philadelphia 76ers	Arcade Edition
NBA 2K25	Vince Carter	Toronto Raptors	Hall of Fame Edition
NBA 2K25	A'ja Wilson	Las Vegas Aces	WNBA Edition
NBA 2K25	Jayson Tatum	Boston Celtics	All Star Edition
NBA 2K25	A'ja Wilson	Las Vegas Aces	All Star Edition
NBA 2K26	Angel Reese	Chicago Sky	Leave No Doubt Edition
NBA 2K26	Carmelo Anthony	New York Knicks	Superstar Edition
NBA 2K27	Victor Wembanyama	San Antonio Spurs	Standard Edition
NBA 2K27	Caitlin Clark	Indiana Fever	Deluxe Edition
NBA 2K27	Derrick Rose	Chicago Bulls	Ultra Edition
NBA 2K27	Bam Adebayo	Miami Heat	Vice City Edition

List of spin off cover athletes
Game	Cover star	
Game	Name	Team
NBA 2K10 Draft Combine	Derrick Rose	Chicago Bulls
NBA Playgrounds	Allen Iverson	Philadelphia 76ers
NBA 2K Playgrounds 2	Karl-Anthony Towns	Minnesota Timberwolves
NBA 2K Playgrounds 2	Kevin Garnett	Minnesota Timberwolves
NBA 2K Playgrounds 2	Jayson Tatum	Boston Celtics
NBA 2K Playgrounds 2	Julius Erving	Philadelphia 76ers
NBA 2K Mobile	Michael Jordan	Chicago Bulls
NBA 2K Mobile	LeBron James	Los Angeles Lakers
NBA 2K Mobile	Zion Williamson	New Orleans Pelicans
NBA 2K Mobile	Kevin Durant	Brooklyn Nets
NBA 2K Mobile	Damian Lillard	Portland Trail Blazers
NBA 2K Mobile	Jayson Tatum	Boston Celtics
NBA 2K Mobile	Donovan Mitchell	Cleveland Cavaliers
NBA 2K Mobile	Shai Gilgeous-Alexander	Oklahoma City Thunder
NBA SuperCard	Karl-Anthony Towns	Minnesota Timberwolves
NBA SuperCard	Jayson Tatum	Boston Celtics

== Reception ==
The NBA 2K series has achieved consistent critical and commercial success. Elements of the series that are frequently praised include its presentation, specifically its commentary, attention to detail, and soundtrack, its abundance of content, its overall gameplay, and its consistency in terms of yearly releases without any drastic dips in quality. In recent years, the series has been seen by some critics as superior to other basketball games, specifically in comparison with EA Sports' NBA Live series.

Conversely, later installments have been criticized for their technical issues, particularly in regards to the online components; the introduction of microtransactions; and the quality of some of the more story-focused incarnations of the MyCareer mode. The series has also been criticized for the lack of innovations in several installments.

Specifically concerning sales, the NBA 2K series has established itself as one of the better-selling video game franchises. A May 2014 earnings call reported that games in the series have sold over 17 million copies worldwide. A report in February 2017, however, suggested that games in the franchise have sold in excess of 68 million copies. According to one analyst, the most recent entries in the series average at least four million copies sold. The best-selling game in the series is NBA 2K14, which sold over seven million copies; it is also Take-Two Interactive's best-selling sports game. NBA 2K16 is the fastest-selling title in the series, shipping over four million copies within its first week of release. NBA 2K16 sold over 10 million units in 2017. As of December 2018, the series has sold over 90 million units worldwide, making it the best-selling NBA video game series.

Games in the NBA 2K series have been nominated for multiple awards, from events such as the Spike Video Game Awards, The Game Awards, and the D.I.C.E. Awards, usually related to being the best sports game of the year.

== NBA 2K League ==
In February 2017, the National Basketball Association, in conjunction with Take-Two Interactive, announced the creation of an esports league centering on the NBA 2K franchise. Known as the NBA 2K League, it commence competition in 2018. It was the first esports league to be operated by a North American professional sports league. The league is structured similarly to the NBA; teams are operated by NBA franchises and feature five professional esports players. The teams compete against each other in the current year's NBA 2K game, and each member of a team only uses their in-game MyPlayer. The league features a regular season, as well as the playoffs and finals.

== Legal issues ==
Two separate lawsuits have been filed against Take-Two related to their recreation of tattoos on NBA players recreated in the series. The first suit was filed by Solid Oak Sketches, filed in January 2016, after trying to seek a US$1.1 million licensing agreement to use the registered copyrighted tattoos with Take-Two. LeBron James had submitted a statement supporting Take-Two, in that he asserted he has given the company the license use his image in their cases, which included his tattoos from Solid Oak Sketches, but this conclusion was thrown out by the judge. In March 2020, a federal District Court judge ruled that while the tattoos were copyrighted elements their use in the games were small enough to meet de minimis considerations, and that further, due to the nature of tattooing, an implicit license to use the tattoos was granted by the license granted for using the players' likeness. The judge summarily dismissed the case, as well as asserting that broadly, video games using licensed likenesses of players with their tattoos will be using the tattoo art within fair use. The defense of fair use was applicable to the defendants as the purpose of the tattoos in the game (to create a realistic depiction of the players) was satisfactorily transformative in comparison to their original purpose (as a form of self-expression through body art).

A separate lawsuit was filed by tattoo artist James Hayden in December 2017; Hayden asserted that Take-Two's recreation of his tattoos designed for NBA players like LeBron James within NBA 2K16 and onward were copyright infringements. Take-Two sought a summary judgement to close the case, but by March 2019, the preceding judge gave partial summary to Take-Two, but left the main question of copyright infringement open. Hayden has failed to register the copyrights until after NBA 2K16 was released, leaving 2K17 and onward potentially liable to be determined in a court trial. One question raised by the judge was whether the NBA 2K series was an ongoing game with annual updates, or if each release was considered a substantial new work, meaning that any copyright violation would apply repeatedly to all three post-2016 games in the series or as a singular violation.

== See also ==
- NFL 2K
- MLB 2K
- NHL 2K
- WWE 2K
- PGA Tour 2K
