= NBA 2K17 =

2016 video game

- Cover art featuring Paul George
- Developer: Visual Concepts
- Publisher: 2K
- Series: NBA 2K
- Platforms: Windows; PlayStation 3 PlayStation 4 Xbox 360; Xbox One; Android iOS
- Release: WW: September 20, 2016 (Note: Players who pre-ordered the game received it on September 16, 2016.); Android, iOS: WW: September 23, 2016
- Genre: Sports
- Modes: Single-player, multiplayer

NBA 2K17 is a 2016 basketball video game developed by Visual Concepts and published by 2K. It is the 18th installment in the NBA 2K franchise and the successor to NBA 2K16. It was released worldwide on September 20, 2016, for Windows, PlayStation 3, PlayStation 4, Xbox 360, and Xbox One. Players who pre-ordered the game received it on September 16, 2016. Paul George of the Indiana Pacers is the cover athlete for the regular edition of the game, while Kobe Bryant is the cover athlete for the 'Legend Edition'. In Italy, the cover athlete is Danilo Gallinari, and in Spain, the cover athlete is Pau Gasol. A version of the game for iOS and Android was released on September 23, 2016. NBA 2K17 was succeeded by NBA 2K18.

NBA 2K17 simulates the experience of the National Basketball Association (NBA). Several game modes are included, such as MyCareer, where the player creates a customizable player and plays through their career, MyGM and MyLeague, both franchise modes where the player controls an entire organization, and MyTeam, where the player creates a team to compete against other players' teams. Along with current NBA teams, other teams are included, such as classic NBA teams, national teams, and EuroLeague teams. The game's soundtrack, which features 50 licensed songs, was curated by Michael B. Jordan, Grimes, Imagine Dragons, and Noah Shebib.

NBA 2K17 was released to universal acclaim. Most critics praised the presentation, the soundtrack, as well as the gameplay and amount of content. By February 2017, the game had shipped approximately 7 million copies. NBA 2K17 is highly regarded as one of the greatest video games within the NBA 2K franchise.

== Gameplay ==
NBA 2K17 is a basketball simulation game which, like the previous games in the series, strives to realistically depict the experience of the National Basketball Association (NBA), as well as present improvements over the previous installments. The player mainly plays NBA basketball games with real-life or customized players and teams. As such, games follow the rules and objectives of NBA basketball games. Several game modes are available for the player and many settings can be customized. The game contains many presentation qualities that are modelled on real-life presentation, such as crowd animations, commentary, pre-game, halftime, and post-game shows, camera angles, lighting, and player animations. There are eleven different commentators and announcers, including Kevin Harlan, Chris Webber, Shaquille O'Neal, David Aldridge, Brent Barry, Steve Smith and Doris Burke. Different arenas have different commentary teams. The menus have also been modified.

Along with playing games with current NBA teams, such as the Philadelphia 76ers and Toronto Raptors, other teams are featured, such as the 2016 United States men's Olympic basketball team, the 2016 Australia men's Olympic basketball team, and the 1992 United States men's Olympic basketball team. Historic NBA teams, such as the 1995–96 Chicago Bulls, the 2000–01 Los Angeles Lakers, and the 1985–86 Boston Celtics, are also present, as are 21 EuroLeague teams, such as CSKA Moscow, Maccabi Tel Aviv, and Real Madrid.

One of the touted improvements is concerning the game's returning MyGM and MyLeague game modes. Both modes have the player acting as the ruling force of all basketball operations for a specific team and allow the player to customize many aspects of the team. MyGM is more focused on maintaining a realistic, functioning team and impressing the owner, whereas MyLeague offers far more customization options. In both modes, the player simulates through seasons, changing personnel, playing in games themselves, and participating in off-season activities, such as the draft. The introduced features focus on league expansion. As well as happening dynamically, the player can start either mode with up to 36 teams and may modify many aspects of every team. The player will go through the process of creating an expansion team in a model very similar to real-life occurrences of expansion teams. As well as creating the logos and jerseys of the teams, an expansion draft is held and other teams must protect a select number of players. The league will automatically adjust the schedule, draft, draft lottery, etc. if expansion teams are created. The player can also download other players' creations.

NBA 2K17 again, for the fifth time in the series, features MyTeam mode, a mode based around the idea of building the ultimate basketball team, and maintaining a virtual trading card collection. Players build their own custom team, selecting the players, jerseys, logos, coach, court, and other basketball related things, and play with their team in basketball tournament-style competitions against other players' teams. Players collect cards that unlock players, playbooks, and other items that can be used in their team or sold. Players purchase card packs, which give the player random items, with Virtual Currency (VC). Cards are classified by their overall rating including four new gem levels: Emerald, Sapphire, Ruby, and Pink Diamond. In addition, a fifth gem level is added called Onyx, which is exclusively for Free agent cards regardless of their overall rating.

MyCareer mode returns. Like previous iterations of the mode in the series, the player creates a basketball player and plays through their career. The player customizes their player's appearance and upgrades their attributes as they play through a college career and enter the NBA. The player plays basketball games and participates in off-court activities. A storyline, written and directed by Creed scriptwriter Aaron Covington, is also present; it features appearances by actors Michael B. Jordan and Hannibal Buress, among others.

== Development and release ==
NBA 2K17 was officially announced on April 13, 2016; the first trailer was revealed. It was released worldwide on September 20, 2016, for Microsoft Windows, PlayStation 3, PlayStation 4, Xbox 360, and Xbox One. Players who pre-ordered the game received it on September 16, 2016. An iOS and Android version of the game was released on September 23, 2016. It is the 18th installment in the NBA 2K series and the successor to NBA 2K16. Aside from the regular edition, a 'Legend Edition' of the game will be available for players to purchase; it features Kobe Bryant as the cover athlete and contains several physical and digital bonuses, such as a poster and Virtual Currency. (Additionally, a 'Gold' version of the 'Legend Edition' is also available, featuring further bonuses.) The 2015–16 NBA season was Bryant's final season in the NBA so a special edition featuring Bryant was developed as a way of paying tribute to what many consider to be one of the greatest basketball players of all time. As such, NBA 2K17 and its 'Legend Edition' were announced on the day Bryant played his final NBA game in April 2016. Bryant was also the cover athlete of NBA 2K10. The standard edition cover art for the game, featuring Paul George of the Indiana Pacers, was unveiled in June 2016. George was chosen to be cover athlete because he is an avid player of NBA 2K games. Visual Concepts also wanted a player who grew up idolizing Bryant. In Italy, the cover athlete is Danilo Gallinari of the Denver Nuggets, and in Spain, the cover athlete is Pau Gasol of the San Antonio Spurs.

One focus Visual Concepts has for NBA 2K17 is the balancing of NBA players who "break the rules" with their unique styles of play. Stephen Curry of the Golden State Warriors in particular is a player that gameplay director Mike Wang said was problematic to balance in NBA 2K16. In real life, Curry frequently takes, and makes, shots that are historically viewed as bad shots. Examples include half-court or three-quarter-court shots, contested off-the-dribble three-pointers, and heavily contested layups. Wang says that over the course of the NBA 2K series, taking these sorts of shots has been penalized because this makes sense for "99.9% of the league". In an attempt to allow for some exceptions, Wang says Visual Concepts has had to come up with a system that allows certain players to not be penalized for taking historically bad shots. However, this creates further balancing complications as there is the potential to effectively "break the game". Experimentations with such a system were made in May 2016 via an update for NBA 2K16, which modified Curry's shooting ability for a thirty-hour period.

The audio in the most recent installments of the NBA 2K series was something Visual Concepts and 2K Sports were "simply not satisfied with". In an attempt to improve it, a team from Visual Concepts travelled to every arena used by NBA teams to record audio for use in the game. One focus was how ball dribbling and arena sound effects sounded; as a result, each arena in the game features distinct arena sound effects and unique dribbling sounds. Along with players' faces and bodies being scanned into the game like previous installments, shoes are now also scanned.

NBA 2K17's soundtrack was curated by Michael B. Jordan, Grimes, Imagine Dragons, and Noah Shebib, and features 50 licensed songs. A companion app, titled MyNBA2K17, for iOS and Android is available alongside the game; it features Karl-Anthony Towns as its cover athlete. Additionally, a free title for the PlayStation Network and Xbox Live called The Prelude is also available; in it, the player can create their MyPlayer for use in the main game's MyCareer mode. On August 10, 2016, a trailer showcasing both the 1992 and 2016 United States men's Olympic basketball teams was revealed. The teams were first announced in July 2016. NBA 2K17 was featured at Gamescom 2016. Another trailer was released on August 22, 2016. A trailer focusing on the game's MyCareer mode was released on September 7, 2016. On September 14, 2016, the final trailer before the game's release date was released.

On January 1, 2019, the online service was shut down and players can no longer play ranked games.

== Reception ==
Reception

Aggregate score
Aggregator	Score
Metacritic	(PC) 90/100 (PS4) 88/100 (XOne) 90/100

Review scores
Publication	Score
Electronic Gaming Monthly	7.5/10
Game Informer	9.5/10
GameSpot	9/10
GamesRadar+	4.5/5
IGN	8.9/10
Polygon	8/10
Hardcore Gamer	4.5/5

According to the review aggregation website Metacritic, the PlayStation 4 version of NBA 2K17 received "generally favorable reviews" based on 47 reviews from critics upon release, while the Microsoft Windows and Xbox One versions were released to "universal acclaim," based on 6 and 17 reviews, respectively.

Ray Carsillo from Electronic Gaming Monthly scored the game a 7.5 out of 10. He thought the game engine was starting to show its age, resulting in inconsistent character models and technical issues. Carsillo commended the MyCareer mode for making the player feel like an actual NBA star and embracing the role-playing game elements, saying that he felt compelled to continue playing. He also liked the Pro-Am mode for its potential use in eSports, the modified dribbling gameplay, and the varied commentary.

Matt Bertz of Game Informer scored the game a 9.5 out of 10, writing: "In the world of sports sims, no other game feels like it's even on the same level as NBA 2K17." He praised the presentation, specifically the crowd movement and player bodies, the amount of content, including the tweaks to the MyCareer and MyGM modes, and the commentary, which he called the most impressive in sports games. Bertz concluded his review by saying that NBA 2K17 is a "must-play for all sports fans".

In criticizing the tutorials and commending the gameplay, visuals, and MyCareer mode, GameSpot's Mat Paget summarized his review with: "After finally devoting a significant amount of time to one of these games, I now see why it's such a well-regarded series, and it makes me wish that every sport got the same treatment that basketball does in NBA 2K17." Paget scored the game a 9 out of 10.

GamesRadar's Richard Grisham scored the game a 4.5 out of 5, writing: "NBA 2K17 is once again a strong, diverse title that beautifully represents the style and culture of professional basketball." Specifically, Grisham praised the "smooth, smart" gameplay, "superb" presentation, and the wealth of content and options available to the player. Grisham experienced some technical issues and said that new players to the series may feel overwhelmed, but his primary criticism was directed towards the presence of microtransactions, in that he felt the player is constantly being pressured into spending real money.

Chase Becotte for IGN gave the game a score of 8.9 out of 10, summarizing his review with: "NBA 2K17 is another rock-solid game in the franchise. It features worthwhile updates to the dribbling and shooting mechanics, and backs up those improvements off the court in ways that make me care about managing my team. All in all, I know NBA 2K17 will be in my gaming rotation for many months to come."

Even though he felt that the story of the MyCareer mode wasn't as strong as it could have been, Matt Paprocki of Polygon commended the various modes in which the player's created player may be used. He also spoke positively of the Pro-Am mode, specifically in regard to its potential use in eSports, saying that the mode makes the series' future feel intriguing. Like Grisham, Paprocki noted the presence of microtransactions. Paprocki summarized his review with: "Taken as a whole, NBA 2K17 is a worthy if subtle upgrade to an already extensive, even exhaustive, sports sim."

Matt Whittaker from Hardcore Gamer scored the game a 4.5 out of 5, writing: "Calling NBA 2K17 the greatest basketball game ever made almost feels redundant, since 2K and Visual Concepts puts out a wonderfully polished product year after year. With a renewed focus on tangible gameplay improvements and general realism, this year's iteration of the longstanding franchise feels like the best yet. Being able to execute more accurate dribble moves and jump shots is fantastic on its own, but hearing engaging and varied commentary at the same time makes the entire experience feel fantastic. MyCareer remains a wonderful way to live [out] your NBA fantasy and MyGM mode has enough depth to keep players coming back for months on end. Aside from what's actually in the package, the greatest thing about NBA 2K17 is that it proves that Visual Concepts and 2K have no intention to grow complacent in their quest for the perfect basketball video game."

During the 20th Annual D.I.C.E. Awards, the Academy of Interactive Arts & Sciences nominated NBA 2K17 for "Sports Game of the Year".

By February 2017, NBA 2K17 had shipped approximately 7 million copies.
