= NBA 2K26 =

2025 video game

- Cover of the Leave No Doubt Edition featuring Shai Gilgeous-Alexander, Angel Reese and Carmelo Anthony
- Developer: Visual Concepts
- Publisher: 2K
- Series: NBA 2K
- Platforms: Nintendo Switch; Nintendo Switch 2; PlayStation 4; PlayStation 5; Xbox One; Xbox Series X/S; Windows; Arcade Edition; iOS; macOS; tvOS; visionOS
- Release: WW: September 5, 2025; Arcade Edition: WW: October 16, 2025
- Genre: Sports
- Modes: Single-player, multiplayer

NBA 2K26 is a 2025 basketball video game developed by Visual Concepts and published by 2K. Based on the National Basketball Association (NBA), it is the 27th installment in the NBA 2K series and is the successor to NBA 2K25 (2024) and the predecessor to NBA 2K27 (2026). The game was released for the Nintendo Switch, Nintendo Switch 2, PlayStation 4, PlayStation 5, Xbox One, Xbox Series X/S, and Windows on September 5, 2025. It was the last NBA 2K game to release for Nintendo Switch, PlayStation 4, and Xbox One.

== Development ==
NBA 2K26 was officially announced on July 8, 2025. The announcement revealed that Shai Gilgeous-Alexander would serve as the cover athlete of the standard edition, following his MVP award and his team's championship title in the preceding NBA season. The following day, Angel Reese was announced as the cover athlete for the WNBA edition, while Carmelo Anthony, who was inducted into the Naismith Basketball Hall of Fame in 2025, was revealed as the cover athlete for the Superstar edition. The most expensive version, titled Leave No Doubt edition, features all three athletes on its cover.

== MyCareer ==
In NBA 2K26, MyCareer introduces updates to The City, including expanded leaderboards that highlight player accomplishments across multiple modes and seasons. A new Crew feature allows players to form custom teams with unique names, logos, and uniforms, and compete in structured online matches. According to early coverage, the mode introduces new crew challenges alongside smoother progression systems in Park and City play. These additions are presented as part of broader MyCareer refinements tied to the game's Gen 9 focus and ProPLAY-powered animation systems.

== Reception ==
IGN has rated the game an 8/10, praising its smooth gameplay.

The Academy of Interactive Arts & Sciences nominated NBA 2K26 for "Sports Game of the Year" at the 29th Annual D.I.C.E. Awards.

By August 2026, the game sold over 12 million units.
