= NBA 2K Playgrounds 2 =

2018 video game

- Cover art featuring (from left): Julius Erving, Karl-Anthony Towns, Kevin Garnett and Jayson Tatum
- Developer: Saber Interactive
- Publisher: 2K
- Series: NBA 2K; Playground Sports
- Engine: Unreal Engine 4
- Platforms: Microsoft Windows; Nintendo Switch; PlayStation 4; Xbox One
- Release: October 16, 2018
- Genre: Sports
- Modes: Single-player, multiplayer

NBA 2K Playgrounds 2 is a sports video game developed by Saber Interactive and published by 2K, and is a spin-off title of the NBA 2K series and a part of the Playground Sports series. The game was released for Windows, Nintendo Switch, PlayStation 4, Xbox One on October 16, 2018. It is the sequel to the 2017 video game NBA Playgrounds. Like its predecessor, NBA 2K Playgrounds 2 is an arcade-style basketball game. The game featured improved AI over its predecessor. Originally scheduled to release on May 22, 2018, the game was delayed to October 16 due to Saber finalizing a publishing deal with 2K.

NBA 2K Playgrounds 2 received several content updates after its release, which added new courts, cosmetics, and players. The game received mixed reviews from critics.

== Gameplay ==
NBA 2K Playgrounds 2 is an arcade-style sports game with gameplay similar to that of its predecessor. The gameplay revolves around 2v2 matches. NBA 2K Playgrounds 2 can be played in single-player and in multiplayer, locally and online. The game can also be played with or against a CPU opponent.The way the shooting meter works is similar to the one in its predecessor. It was changed from a bar to a semi-circle, but it keeps the concept of stopping it in the green zone. If the player lands outside of the green zone, they automatically miss. Microtransactions were introduced to the game. In order to unlock new characters, card packs have to be bought with Baller Bucks, the in-game currency. Baller Bucks can be earned by completing Seasons, Exhibitions, and performing well in minigames. Some teams are inaccessible until a pack with a player on that team is opened. For example, the Los Angeles Lakers have 14 cards, while the Chicago Bulls have nine. 5,000 Gold Coins can be spent to unlock the entire roster. Each player has their own unique stats, and are able to be unlocked and customized. Exhibition mode can be played offline in local multiplayer.

Shooting in NBA 2K Playgrounds 2. Semi-circle shooting meter on the bottom of the screen.

The Tournament mode of the first game has been replaced by the NBA Season mode. Each match last 3 minutes, and a minimum of 23 games are played to win a championship. If won, the player is awarded with an "epic" card. Season mode can also be played in online co-op. NBA Playgrounds' Lottery Pick system returns in NBA 2K Playgrounds 2. After a meter is filled by performing certain actions, the player receives a special ability. There are nine different abilities, including freezing the opponent's basket for a limited time and double points for dunks or three-pointers. The game introduces a new ranked mode called Playgrounds Championship. Playgrounds Championship features a variety of different modes, leaderboards, and advanced stats. The mode also comes with a three-pointer contest. Players enter higher divisions by winning games.

== Development and release ==
On April 17, 2018, following a rating by the Australian Classification Board, Saber Interactive announced that the game, then known as NBA Playgrounds 2, would release for PC, Nintendo Switch, PlayStation 4, and Xbox One. It was scheduled to release in summer 2018. Over 200 players were set to be playable. Four-player online matches were to be introduced, along with the Playgrounds Championship mode. Dedicated servers and improved matchmaking were planned to be added the game. In May, a gameplay trailer was released. On May 21, Saber Interactive delayed NBA 2K Playgrounds 2. Those who digitally pre-ordered the game reported on social media that their pre-orders were being canceled. Saber Interactive told Polygon that the pre-orders were refunded because they felt that it was the "right thing to do for our fans".

On July 24, 2K Games announced that it would publish the game, and it was renamed to NBA 2K Playgrounds 2. Saber Interactive CEO Matthew Karch stated that 2K was committed to bringing a "great basketball experience" to players. Commenting on the partnership, Visual Concepts president Greg Thomas stated that the game would have some "added NBA 2K flair". Saber was allowed to use 2K's licenses, such as songs and the likenesses of a former players. It was announced that the game was delayed due to the finalization of the publishing deal between 2K and Saber Interactive. The game was delayed to fall 2018. NBA 2K Playgrounds 2's October 16 release date was announced on September 18. While 2K did not make an official announcement, a listing on Best Buy Canada showed that a physical version of the game would be available for the Nintendo Switch. 300 players were to be available at launch, with 200 more planned to be added through post-release updates. 100 signature moves were also planned to be added to the game. In an October interview with Polygon, Karch stated that 2K Sports helped make "substantial" contributions in the game's development. According to Karch, 20% of the improvements had taken place in the months since 2K's involvement. Speaking on the future of Playgrounds, Karch stated that the series was likely to continue, stating that 2K saw the "long-term potential". NBA 2K Playgrounds 2 was released for Microsoft Windows, Nintendo Switch, PlayStation 4, and Xbox One on October 16, 2018.

In 2020, 2K and Humble Bundle partnered together to create the 2K Game Together Bundle. The game was included as a reward for those who reached the average tier of the Bundle. The bundle was available until April 28. 2K donated the proceeds to International Medical Corps to combat the COVID-19 pandemic.

In a PlayStation.Blog, Karch wrote that one of the main things that the developers wanted to do was to expand online play. This led to the creation of the Playgrounds Championship. The team also wanted to focus on single-player, which led to the creation of Season Mode. New animations and player models were created, along with the improvement of the AI. Gameplay mechanics such as double alley-oops were added to bring "high-flying action".

The game was delisted from digital storefronts on February 26, 2026, and the online servers were shut down on July 9, 2026.

=== Downloadable content ===
NBA 2K Playgrounds received several content updates after its release. On October 25, 2018, a free Halloween update was released for PlayStation 4, Xbox One, and PC. 2K stated that the update would release for the Nintendo Switch on a later date. The update included a Halloween-themed playground, new outfits, a lottery pick called the Ankle Breaker, and the addition of former basketball player Kareem Abdul-Jabbar. Multiple technical improvements and balance changes were introduced, including blocking rates, character speed, and three-pointer percentages. Minor technical fixes were introduced to address lag, and the game's shot meter. According to 2K Games and Saber Interactive, it would be the "first of many" free updates for the game.

In December, the Christmas update was released. It added a new playground, and new cosmetic items. 35 players were added to the game, including Karl Malone and Dennis Rodman. In February 2019, the All Star update was released, adding a playground based on the court of the 2019 NBA All-Star Game. A Valentine's Day playground was also added to the game, along with new cosmetics and 70 new players. The update added daily challenges, an item that can level up players to Diamond, and an unranked Championship Mode. Stability fixes and improvements were introduced, including the ability to see player challenges in the pause menu.

Saber and 2K partnered with Safe Schools for Alex organization, to raise awareness and money for school shootings. The update was released on March 7, adding a court dedicated to Alex Schachter, a victim of the Stoneman Douglas High School shooting. The high school's jazz band recorded the song "25 or 6 to 4" by the rock band Chicago. Rapper Vanilla Ice was also included in the game's soundtrack. To benefit the organization, Saber and 2K combined to match all donations up to $100,000. The donations ended on April 1. In April, an update was released that added a map set on Mars. A court editor and new outfits were added. Cross-play support was added for the PC, Xbox One, and Nintendo Switch versions of the game.

== Reception ==
Reception

Aggregate score
Aggregator	Score
Metacritic	Switch: 69/100 (Note: Score based on 6 reviews.); PS4: 73/100 (Note: Score based on 29 reviews.); XONE: 62/100 (Note: Score based on 12 reviews.)

Review scores
Publication	Score
Destructoid	4/10
GameSpot	5/10
IGN	8/10
Nintendo Life	8/10
Nintendo World Report	7.5/10
Push Square	5/10

NBA 2K Playgrounds 2 received "mixed or average" reviews according to review aggregator Metacritic.

Brandon Marlow from Push Square rated the game 5/10 stars, describing it as a "lacklustre effort" and a "disappointing" sequel. He felt that the attempt to address certain issues made the game worse. Ty Edwards from Nintendo World Report liked the addition of the Season mode, and commended the ability to unlock specific characters. However, Edwards felt that the process of unlocking things was slower, and believed that the power-ups were "overpowered".

Michael Higham from GameSpot praised the Lottey Pick power-ups, writing that it provided a "fun twist". Higham criticized the shot meter system and the game's presentation, referring to the latter as "underwhelming". Higham felt that the starting roster left the player at a disadvantage. Dom Reseigh-Lincoln from Nintendo Life wrote that the addition of microtransactions was "hardly surprising", but he felt that it didn't impact the game as hard. Reseigh-Lincoln called the gameplay "enjoyable", and described the game as "bright and empowering".

IGN's Steven Petite praised the game for its improvements to game mechanics, and the pick-up-and-play gameplay.Destructoid's Patrick Hancock was more critical, writing that the game did "not need to exist".

In June 2022, Nintendo Life included the game in their "Best Nintendo Switch Sports Games" list.
