= NBA 2K22 =

2021 video game

- Standard cover featuring Luka Dončić
- Developer: Visual Concepts
- Publisher: 2K
- Series: NBA 2K
- Platforms: Nintendo Switch; PlayStation 4; PlayStation 5; Windows; Xbox One; Xbox Series X/S; iOS; macOS; tvOS
- Release: WW: September 10, 2021; Arcade Edition: WW: October 19, 2021
- Genre: Sports
- Modes: Single-player, multiplayer

NBA 2K22 is a 2021 basketball video game developed by Visual Concepts and published by 2K. Based on the National Basketball Association (NBA), it is the 23rd installment in the NBA 2K franchise, the successor to NBA 2K21 and the predecessor to NBA 2K23. The game was released on September 10, 2021, for Nintendo Switch, PlayStation 4, PlayStation 5, Windows, Xbox One and Xbox Series X/S. The NBA 2K22 Arcade Edition was released for iOS, macOS and tvOS through Apple Arcade and Android on October 19, 2021. As of May 2022, the game has sold over 10 million copies. The online servers for the game were shut down on December 31, 2023.

== Cover athlete ==
For the first time in the series, the game features six different cover athletes: the standard and current-gen editions feature Luka Dončić of the Dallas Mavericks, the 75th Anniversary Edition features Kareem Abdul-Jabbar of the Los Angeles Lakers, Dirk Nowitzki (also for the Mavericks), and Kevin Durant of the Brooklyn Nets. The Special WNBA 25th Anniversary Edition features Candace Parker of the Chicago Sky. The Japanese box art features Rui Hachimura of the Washington Wizards. Parker became the first WNBA player to become the cover athlete for the NBA 2K series.

== Soundtrack ==
The NBA 2K22 soundtrack features hip-hop, pop and rock songs. This version of NBA 2K is the first of the series to update its soundtrack as music gets released. This feature of the game is called "First Friday's" and new music from the day's top artists and new artists will be released.

== Reception ==
Reception

Aggregate score
| Aggregator | Score |
|---|---|
| Metacritic | (NS) 66/100 (PS4) 71/100 (PS5) 76/100 (XSX) 76/100 |

Review scores
| Publication | Score |
|---|---|
| Hardcore Gamer | 4/5 |
| IGN | 7/10 |
| Nintendo Life | 8/10 |
| Nintendo World Report | 7/10 |
| Push Square | 8/10 |
| Shacknews | 6/10 |

NBA 2K22 received "generally favorable" reviews from critics, according to Metacritic. During the 25th Annual D.I.C.E. Awards, the Academy of Interactive Arts & Sciences nominated NBA 2K22 for "Sports Game of the Year".
