= NBA 2K18 =

2017 video game

- Revised cover art featuring Kyrie Irving
- Developer: Visual Concepts
- Publisher: 2K
- Series: NBA 2K
- Platforms: Windows; Nintendo Switch; PlayStation 3 PlayStation 4 Xbox 360; Xbox One iOS; Android
- Release: WW: September 19, 2017
- Genre: Sports
- Modes: Single-player, multiplayer

NBA 2K18 is a 2017 basketball video game developed by Visual Concepts and published by 2K. It is the 19th installment in the NBA 2K franchise, the successor to NBA 2K17, and the predecessor to NBA 2K19. It was released on September 19, 2017, for Windows, Nintendo Switch, PlayStation 3, PlayStation 4, Xbox 360, Xbox One, iOS and Android. Kyrie Irving of the Boston Celtics serves as cover athlete for the regular edition of the game, Shaquille O'Neal is the cover athlete for the special editions, DeMar DeRozan of the Toronto Raptors is the cover athlete for the Canadian version, and Kevin Durant of the Golden State Warriors is the cover athlete for NIKE Connect Special Edition. While a member of the Cleveland Cavaliers when selected for the cover, Irving was traded to the Boston Celtics before the game's release. As a result, a new cover depicting Irving in a Celtics uniform was revealed alongside the original cover. This was the last installment in the series to be released for the Xbox 360 and PlayStation 3.

NBA 2K18, like the previous games in the series, simulates the experience of the National Basketball Association (NBA). Several game modes are present, including the team-managing MyGM and MyLeague modes, which were a considerable emphasis during development, and MyCareer, in which the player creates and plays through the career of their own player. The game features a licensed soundtrack consisting of 49 songs.

== Gameplay ==
NBA 2K18 is a basketball simulation game which, like the previous games in the series, strives to realistically depict the National Basketball Association (NBA), as well as present improvements over the previous installments. The player mainly plays NBA games with real-life or customized players and teams; games follow the rules and objectives of NBA games. Several game modes are present and many settings can be customized. In terms of commentary, Kobe Bryant and Kevin Garnett appear as guest commentators.

Along with the current season's teams and players, previous games in the series have featured NBA teams from past eras, such as the 1995–96 Chicago Bulls and the 1985–86 Boston Celtics. NBA 2K18 adds seventeen more such teams, including the 2007–08 Denver Nuggets and the 1998–99 New York Knicks, as well as 'All-Time Teams', teams for each franchise consisting of the greatest players in the respective franchise's history.

A staple of the series, MyCareer, returns as one of the available game modes. MyCareer is a career mode in which the player creates their own customizable basketball player and plays through their basketball career. The mode features a storyline which plays out as the player competes in games as well as off-court activities. The creation tools have been overhauled – new hairstyles and body archetypes are available for the player to make use of, among other things.

The game's returning MyGM and MyLeague game modes, which task the player with managing all basketball operations for a specific team, were a point of emphasis during development. MyGM is more focused on realism, whereas MyLeague offers more customization options. MyGM mode attempts to introduce more cutscene-style interactions than previous games in an attempt to give the mode a storyline, which is dubbed 'The Next Chapter', similar to the series' MyCareer mode. Additionally, several additions have been made to the mode which caters to the NBA's latest Collective Bargaining Agreement, and the NBA G League, the NBA's official minor league basketball organization, is present.

NBA 2K18 again, for the sixth time in the series, features MyTeam mode, a mode based around the idea of building the ultimate basketball team, and maintaining a virtual trading card collection. Players assemble and play with their team in basketball tournament-style competitions against other players' teams in several different formats. Assets for a team are acquired through various means, including randomized card packs and the auction house. Virtual Currency (VC) is used extensively in the mode.

The game introduces a new feature to the series, Neighborhoods, which tie into the game's MyCareer, MyPark, and ProAm game modes. In addition to allowing access to the aforementioned modes, Neighborhoods feature an open world design which players can explore while interacting with other players. Several activities can be completed to raise attributes and the player can purchase items. The 2K Sports Pre-game show returned with hosts Ernie Johnson, Shaquille O'Neal and Kenny "The Jet" Smith. While the in-game main commentators are Kevin Harlan and Greg Anthony with additional voices of Doris Burke, Clark Kellogg, Steve Smith, Chris Webber and Brent Barry. The sideline reporter is David Aldridge.

== Development and release ==
NBA 2K18 was officially confirmed in January 2017, and was released worldwide on September 19, 2017; players who pre-ordered the game received it on September 15, 2017. It is the first game in the series to be released for the Nintendo Switch; it was also released for the Xbox One, Xbox 360, PlayStation 4, PlayStation 3, and Microsoft Windows. Kyrie Irving of the Boston Celtics is the cover athlete. When the game's cover was revealed, Irving was a member of the Cleveland Cavaliers, but was later traded to the Celtics before the game's release. As a result, developer Visual Concepts announced that a revised cover featuring Irving in a Celtics uniform would be released due to the trade. The special edition versions of the game, which include various physical and digital extras, feature Shaquille O'Neal as the cover athlete. O'Neal was previously the cover athlete of NBA 2K6 and NBA 2K7. In Canada, DeMar DeRozan of the Toronto Raptors is the cover athlete. Kevin Durant of the Golden State Warriors appears on the cover for the NIKE Connect Special Edition. Like NBA 2K17, a free title for PlayStation Network and Xbox Live, called The Prelude, was made available prior to the release of the main game; in it, the player creates their MyPlayer for use in the main game's MyCareer mode. On September 6, 2017, it was announced that EuroLeague will not be included for the game since both EuroLeague and NBA 2K ended their licensing agreement together.

A companion app, titled MyNBA2K18, for iOS and Android is available alongside the game; it features Kristaps Porziņģis as its cover athlete. Like previous games in the series, NBA 2K18 features a licensed soundtrack; it consists of 49 songs. The first screenshots of the game were released in July 2017. The first gameplay trailer was released on August 8, 2017. The trailer highlights the developers' attempts to improve the game's presentation; player body archetypes and faces have been overhauled and more uniforms and accessories have been scanned into the game. An extended gameplay trailer was released on August 16, 2017. A trailer for the game's MyCareer mode was released on August 31, 2017.

== Reception ==
Reception

Aggregate score
Aggregator	Score
Metacritic	85/100 (XONE); 80/100 (PS4); 74/100 (NS)

Review scores
Publication	Score
Electronic Gaming Monthly	7/10
Game Informer	9/10
GamesRadar+	4/5
IGN	8.4/10
Polygon	7/10

NBA 2K18 received "generally favorable" reviews for Xbox One and PlayStation 4 versions of the game, while the Nintendo Switch version received "mixed or average" reviews from critics, according to review aggregator website Metacritic.

In their 8.4/10 review, IGN wrote: "NBA 2K18 impresses by making players behave more like their real-life counterparts than ever before." Game Informer gave it a 9/10, writing, "NBA 2K18 has a few holes in its game – the series needs to improve its writing, the ballyhooed MyCareer Neighborhood hub falls flat, and the tech powering the series is nearing retirement age. That said, boil the game down to its essentials and you have a rock-solid, well-balanced sports sim that provides an immensely entertaining shoulder-to-shoulder same-couch multiplayer experience."

Polygon gave the game a score of 7/10, praising the visuals but criticizing the reliance on microtransactions, saying: "Of course, it's no surprise that NBA 2K18 looks good; the series has looked the part since its advent on the Dreamcast, staying relevant visually and staking out its own part of basketball culture. NBA 2K18 continues the trend, capturing the feel of basketball's urban centers in The Neighborhood. It's too bad, then, that The Neighborhood is covered in ads and persistent microtransaction begging. The growing push to spend real dollars on VC impacts those looking to build even the most basic of player avatars." Electronic Gaming Monthly gave the game a 6.5/10, writing: "Maybe NBA 2K18 has been the king of the court for too long and now it's getting boring. Instead of improving gameplay, it's figuring out more ways to make money through MyCareer and MyTeam. Its new Neighborhood functions as a metaphor for the entire game itself, in that it seems like a big addition to the game but you quickly realize it's pretty much just an empty shopping mall and a distraction from the actual game."

The biggest issue Kotaku brought up was the amount of advertising and time wasted playing the MyCareer. In older games, the MyCareer was spent in your apartment, shooting around and buying shoes from the comfort of your bed. But in NBA 2K18, to perform a simple act such as cutting your hair or changing your shirt, you need to walk a long distance down the street. In a hub where you can meet other players but not interact with them, NBA 2K18's MyCareer mode falls flat compared to previous years. "2K18's chances of telling a good story aren't helped by the two wrong feet it sets off on. Rather than earn your spot in the NBA by playing through a college career, you're told that you're playing as someone who quit basketball to pursue a career as a DJ, and who is able to return to the game—and the NBA itself—by playing a few street games in an amateur tournament." Kotaku also criticised the games exploitative, egregious microtransaction scheme.

Public reception to the game has been much poorer. Since its release, it has held mostly negative to overwhelmingly negative reviews on Steam, with many complaints about the large amount of in-game currency (bought with real-world money) required to play the game to an enjoyable level. Similarly, Metacritic scores from players rather than critics show scores below 2/10 for the Xbox One and PS4 versions. As of May 2020, it is the 17th lowest ranked game on Steam.

=== Sales ===
NBA 2K18 topped the sales charts in Australia and New Zealand. It reached number 2 on the US downloads chart. The game also reached number 3 in the UK sales charts. In Japan, it reached number 4. It made it to number 10 in the European download chart. The game became the best-selling sport title of 2017. 2K's parent company, Take-Two Interactive, announced that the game sold 6 million copies just a month after release. As of August 2018, the game has sold 10 million copies.

=== Accolades ===
NBA 2K18 was nominated for "Best Sports/Racing Game" at The Game Awards 2017, and for "Best Sports/Driving Game" at the Titanium Awards, and came in third place for "Best Sports" at the Global Game Awards 2017. It won the award for "Best Sports Game" at Game Informer's Best of 2017 Awards, and also came in second place for the same category in their Reader's Choice Best of 2017 Awards. In their 2017 Sports Game of the Year Awards, it won the awards for "Best Graphics", "Best Presentation", "Best GM/Franchise Mode", "Best New Feature" for The Next Chapter, "Biggest Disappointment", and "Best Sports Game". In addition, the game won the award for "Game, Franchise Sports" at the 17th Annual National Academy of Video Game Trade Reviewers Awards.

=== Bribery Allegations ===
Although NBA 2K18 received mostly positive reviews from gaming journalists, Suddi Aran of The Sixth Axis gave the game a score of 3/10 on September 21, 2017, heavily criticizing the use of microtransactions. Shortly after the review was posted, another post was added stating that they were contacted by the publisher who stated their review was a "protest vote", to which the website temporarily removed the 3/10 score, pending a response from 2K regarding the criticisms raised by Aran. This led to accusations of gaming websites such as IGN being bribed by 2K Games for positive reviews. A day after the post was made, the review was re-instated, with the site stating that they have received no further word from 2K.
