= Aceyalone discography =

This is the discography of American rapper Aceyalone. He has released 17 studio albums and 8 collaboration albums.

== Studio albums ==
Aceyalone

- All Balls Don't Bounce (1995)
- A Book of Human Language (1998) (with Mumbles)
- Accepted Eclectic (2001)
- Hip Hop and the World We Live In (2002) (with Elusive)
- Love & Hate (2003)
- Magnificent City (2006) (with RJD2)
- Lightning Strikes (2007) (with Bionik)
- Aceyalone & the Lonely Ones (2009) (with Bionik)
- Leanin' on Slick (2013) (with Bionik)
- Action (2015) (with Bionik)
- Mars (2016) (with Slippers)
- Ancient Future: Conversations With God (2017) (with Orko Eloheim)
- 43rd & Excellence (2018) (with Fat Jack)
- Mars, Vol. 02 (2018) (with Slippers & Michelle Stevens)
- Let's Get It (2019)
- Ice Water (2020)
- Ugmosis (2022)

Freestyle Fellowship (Aceyalone with Myka 9, P.E.A.C.E. & Self Jupiter)

- To Whom It May Concern... (1991)
- Innercity Griots (1993)
- Temptations (2001)
- Shockadoom (2002) [EP]
- The Promise (2011)

Haiku d'Etat (Aceyalone with Abstract Rude and Myka 9)

- Haiku d'Etat (1999)
- Coup de Theatre (2004)

The A-Team (Aceyalone with Abstract Rude)

- Who Framed the A-Team? (1999)
- Lab Down Under (2003)

== Other releases ==
- Version 2.0: To Whom It May Concern... Remixed by J. Sumbi (2001) [remixes of tracks from To Whom It May Concern...]
- The Lost Tapes (2003) [mixtape]
- Grade A (2004) [rarities collection]
- Grand Imperial (2006) [mixtape]
- Who Reframed the A-Team? (2006) ['best of' compilation by The A-Team]
- Power Plant (2011) [mixtape by Freestyle Fellowship]
- Aceyalone 101 (2013) [rarities collection]
- Action Accessed Remixes (2017) [remixes of tracks from Action]

== Singles ==
- "Mic Check" (1995)
- "The Greatest Show On Earth" (1996)
- "The Guidelines" (1998)
- "Moonlit Skies" (2003)
- "Lost Your Mind" (2003)
- "Fire" (2005)
- "Supahero" (2006)

== Guest appearances ==
- The Nonce - "Bus Stops" from World Ultimate (1995)
- Fat Jack - "Gimme Five Feet", “We Like Breakbeats” and "Golden Mic" from Cater to the DJ (1999)
- Swollen Members - "Consumption" from Balance (1999)
- Nobody - "Faces of the Deep" from Earthtones EP (1999)
- Mystik Journeymen - "Reflections" from The Black Sands ov Eternia (1999)
- Dilated Peoples - "The Shape of Things to Come" from The Platform (2000)
- Anti-Pop Consortium - "Heatrays" from Tragic Epilogue (2000)
- Self Jupiter - "4808-4911-A" from Hard Hat Area (2001)
- Busdriver - "Jazz Fingers" from Temporary Forever (2002)
- Linkin Park - "Wth>You" from Reanimation (2002)
- 2Mex - "3 or 13" and "No Category" from Sweat Lodge Infinite (2003)
- DJ Drez - "Last Show" from The Capture of Sound (2003)
- Zion I - "Cheeba Cheeba" from Deep Water Slang V2.0 (2003)
- Omid - "Live from Tokyo" from Monolith (2003)
- The Grouch & Eligh - "This Is Yo Life" from No More Greener Grasses (2003)
- Wildchild - "Bounce" from Secondary Protocol (2003)
- Abstract Rude - "What Tyme Iz It?" from Showtyme (2003)
- Fat Jack - "Keep Rock'n On" from Cater to the DJ 2 (2004)
- Ellay Khule - "B-Girl Queendom" from Califormula (2005)
- Onry Ozzborn - "What to Do?" from In Between (2005)
- DJ Z-Trip - "Everything Changes" from Shifting Gears (2005)
- Subtitle - "Cray Crazy" from Young Dangerous Heart (2005)
- Thirsty Fish - "Fall Apart" from Testing the Waters (2007)
- Myka 9 - "Options" from 1969 (2009)
- Himself - "Social Drinker" from Feel Like a Star (2011)
- Luckyiam - "For You" from I Love Haters (2011)
- Myka 9 - "Oh Yeah... Alright" from Mykology (2012)
- Abstract Rude - "The Media" from Dear Abbey (2012)
- Abstract Rude - "For tha Luv" from Keep the Feel: A Legacy of Hip Hop Soul (2015)
- RJD2 - "A Genuine Gentleman" from The Fun Ones (2020)

== Compilation appearances ==
- "Jurassick", "I Think", "Maskaraid", and "Treble and Bass" on Project Blowed (1995)
- "Super Human Hip Hop Head" from Defenders of the Underworld (1999)
- "Project Bliznaiznowed" on The Funky Precedent (1999)
- "Future Rockers" on Tags of the Times 3 (2001)
- "Do the Math", "Give It Here", and "Superstars" on Project Blowed Presents the Good Brothers (2003)
- "K.O. Player" on Okayplayer: True Notes Vol. 1 (2004)
- "Doin' My Job" on 2K6: The Tracks (2005)
- "Enter the Kaos", "Do Unto Others", and "Ruff Rhymes" on Project Blowed 10th Anniversary (2005)
- "Let's Go Get It", "Borderline", and "Krazy World" on Calicomm 2004 (2005)
- "Champions" on Dan the Automator Presents 2K7 (2006)
- "Fresh Rhymes & Videotape", "Legendary Status" & "Left out in the Cold" on Fresh Rhymes & Videotape (2008)
