= Vodka & Ayahuasca =

Studio album by Gangrene
- Released: January 24, 2012
- Genre: Underground hip-hop
- Length: 41:46
- Label: Decon
- Producer: Alchemist; Oh No

Gangrene chronology
Gutter Water (2010)	Vodka & Ayahuasca (2012)	You Disgust Me (2015)

Vodka & Ayahuasca is the second full-length studio album by American hip-hop duo Gangrene. It was released on January 1, 2012, through Decon. Production was handled by members Oh No and Alchemist. It features guest appearances from Evidence, Kool G Rap, Prodigy, Roc C and Roc Marciano.

== Critical reception ==
Professional ratings
Aggregate scores
Source	Rating
Metacritic	76/100
Review scores
Source	Rating
AllMusic	4/5 stars
Consequence of Sound	C−
HipHopDX	4/5
Pitchfork	7.1/10
PopMatters	7/10
RapReviews	7.5/10
XXL	3/5

Vodka & Ayahuasca was met with generally favorable reviews from music critics. At Metacritic, which assigns a normalized rating out of 100 to reviews from mainstream publications, the album received an average score of 76, based on thirteen reviews.

AllMusic's David Jeffries wrote: "Gangrene is dirty, underground hip-hop excellence as expected, but Vodka & Ayahuasca takes it to another level, or realm". Phillip Mlynar of HipHopDX praised the album, saying: "Underground Hip Hop in the right and literal sense of the term, Vodka & Ayahuasca is an uncompromising listen that dwells in the underbelly of an increasingly saccharine rap scene". Matt Jost of RapReviews stated that the album "is not only one of the strongest rap releases so far this year, in terms of 'crazy combinations' it stands up to Madvillainy and Hell: The Sequel". Nate Patrin of Pitchfork wrote: "that atmosphere helps hold up Vodka & Ayahuasca's sense of anarchic, altered-state unease when the lyrics don't quite cut it, though the tolerable-at-worst punchlines and metaphors are easier to stomach the less dead-serious you take them". David Amidon of PopMatters found the album "generally a more challenging listen than Gutter Water, but it's definitely a more rewarding one as well and a can't miss for fans of either artist or those curious to hear a more unique variety of sample material than the usual hip-hop fare".

In mixed reviews, Michael Madden of Consequence of Sound wrote: "take Vodka and Ayahuasca as a testament to these guys' long-acquired mastery of their craft, even as the rhymes are generally less than striking". Jesse Gissen of XXL wrote: "the majority of the raps are unfortunately provided by ALC and Dr. No: two artists more known for getting busy behind the boards than on the mic".

== Track listing ==
No.	Title	Producer(s)	Length
1.	"Intro" (The Mixings)	Oh No	1:08
2.	"Gladiator Music" (featuring Kool G Rap)	Oh No	4:38
3.	"Flame Throwers"	Oh No	2:48
4.	"Drink Up" (featuring Roc Marciano)	Alchemist	3:24
5.	"Auralac Bags"	Oh No	3:31
6.	"Vodka & Ayahuasca"	Oh No	2:59
7.	"Dump Truck" (featuring Prodigy)	Alchemist	4:50
8.	"Due Work"	Alchemist	3:22
9.	"Odds Cracked"	Oh No	2:21
10.	"Top Instructors"	Oh No	3:13
11.	"Dark Shades" (featuring Evidence and Roc C)	Alchemist	3:32
12.	"The Groove"	Oh No	3:07
13.	"Livers for Sale"	Alchemist	2:00
14.	"Outro" (The Downsides)	Oh No	0:53
Total length:			41:46

== Personnel ==
- Michael "Oh No" Jackson – lyrics, vocals, producer (tracks: 1–3, 5, 6, 9, 10, 12, 14), mixing
- Alan "The Alchemist" Maman – lyrics, vocals, producer (tracks: 4, 7, 8, 11, 13), mixing
- Nathaniel "Kool G Rap" Wilson – lyrics & vocals (track 2)
- Rakeem "Roc Marciano" Myer – lyrics & vocals (track 4)
- Albert "Prodigy" Johnson – lyrics & vocals (track 7)
- Michael "Evidence" Peretta – lyrics & vocals (track 11)
- Damien "Roc C" Smith – lyrics & vocals (track 11)
- Romeo "DJ Romes" Jimenez – scratches, mixing
- Ricardo Gutierrez – mastering
- David Homer – art direction, artwork
- Peter Bittenbender – art direction
