= NBA 2K7 =

2006 basketball video game

- Xbox 360 cover art featuring Shaquille O'Neal
- Developer: Visual Concepts
- Publisher: 2K
- Series: NBA 2K
- Platforms: PlayStation 2, PlayStation 3, Xbox, Xbox 360
- Release: PlayStation 2, Xbox, & Xbox 360: NA: September 26, 2006; AU: October 20, 2006; EU: October 27, 2006 (Xbox); EU: November 3, 2006; PlayStation 3: NA: November 13, 2006; PAL: April 27, 2007
- Genre: Sports
- Modes: Single-player, multiplayer

NBA 2K7 is a 2006 basketball simulation video game developed by Visual Concepts and published by 2K. It is the eighth installment in the NBA 2K franchise and the successor to NBA 2K6. It was released in 2006 for PlayStation 2, Xbox, and Xbox 360, and as a launch title for PlayStation 3. Shaquille O'Neal of the Miami Heat is the cover athlete of the game. NBA 2K7 is the predecessor to NBA 2K8 in the NBA 2K series. This was the second and last installment in the series to be released for the Xbox.

The game strives to simulate the experience of the National Basketball Association and attempts to be as realistic as possible. Players play NBA basketball games with real life teams in a variety of game modes. Players may customize the gameplay, as well as the players, and can take control of an NBA team as the general manager, hiring coaches, and making a profit. The game features all the main aspects found in the NBA, such as commentary, realistic crowd animations, and halftime shows. The game's overall gameplay, as well as the aesthetics, was said to have been significantly improved before release.

NBA 2K7 received a positive reception upon release. A lot of praise was directed at the game's overall presentation; some critics called the visuals "gorgeous", while others said it was "spectacular" and achieved great "visual feats". Most other praise was directed at the game's improved gameplay, as well as the depth and wealth of content. Some negative comments were made concerning the models and animations of the players.

== Gameplay ==
NBA 2K7 is a basketball simulation game based on the National Basketball Association. Particularly similar to NBA 2K6, NBA 2K7 simulates the experience of the sport of basketball, and more specifically, the experience of the NBA. Players play NBA games with any real life or custom team, in many different game modes, such as quick play or Association. Players customize many aspects of the presentation and gameplay, such as camera angles, and the level of realism. Like the past NBA 2K games, NBA 2K7 is marketed as being as realistic as the actual NBA, with all the things featured in NBA games, such as commentary, and mascots. Kevin Harlan is the play-by-play commentator, Kenny Smith is the colour commentator, and Craig Sager is the sideline reporter.

Players can create their own players, using a system that has been modified from the previous games in the series. Players can then use their player in 'Street' mode, a mode where players do battle against established NBA stars in street ball competitions. On the PlayStation 3, instead of shooting free throws with button presses, players must move the DualShock 3 controller in a way that resembles how free throws are shot in real life. Additionally, if a player is playing against another player, that player can shake their controller, which shakes the screen, in an attempt to distract the free throw shooter. Several online modes are present, including tournaments, and a mode that can support up to ten players, in which each individual player on the court at that time is controlled by a real person.

Before release, many of the game's features were said to have been drastically improved. Features that were heavily marketed include the updated visuals, individual player styles and animations, the number of players, which was said to be as large as the NBA's, the new creation tools, and the online modes.

== Development ==
Shaquille O'Neal, the cover athlete of NBA 2K6, is again the cover athlete of NBA 2K7. Therefore, he, Allen Iverson of the Philadelphia 76ers, and Anthony Davis of the Los Angeles Lakers are the only three players at this point who have appeared on multiple covers of the NBA 2K series.

== Soundtrack ==
Music for NBA 2K7 includes tracks (primarily hip hop) by the artists; Aceyalone, Abstract Rude, Afrika Bambaataa, Celly Cel, Chali 2na, Choir Boy, MIH, The Crest, Deep Rooted, DJ Godfather, DJ Nasty, E-40, Fabolous, Hieroglyphics, Jay Rich, Johaz, Ithaka, Lupe Fiasco, Evidence of Dilated Peoples, Mos Def, Anwar Supastar, Rhymefest, Slim Thug, SonicTrip, Ginesis, TOPKAT, Wax Tailor, and Zion I.

The soundtrack CD for NBA 2K7 was produced by Dan the Automator; it features 13 songs, not all songs featured in the game are present on the CD. The soundtrack was released by Decon with the title Dan the Automator Presents 2K7.

== Release ==
NBA 2K7 was released for the PlayStation 2, Xbox, and Xbox 360 on September 26, 2006; and for PlayStation 3 on November 13, 2006. This is the first game in the NBA 2K series to be released on the PlayStation 3, and the last to be released on the original Xbox.

== Reception ==
Reception

Aggregate score
| Aggregator | Score | | | |
| Aggregator | PS2 | PS3 | Xbox | Xbox 360 |
|---|---|---|---|---|
| Metacritic | 81/100 | 80/100 | 83/100 | 84/100 |

Review scores
| Publication | Score | | | |
| Publication | PS2 | PS3 | Xbox | Xbox 360 |
|---|---|---|---|---|
| Electronic Gaming Monthly | N/A | N/A | N/A | 8/10 |
| Eurogamer | N/A | N/A | N/A | 8/10 |
| Game Informer | 8/10 | 8/10 | 8/10 | 8.25/10 |
| GamePro | N/A | 3.5/5 | N/A | 4.5/5 |
| GameRevolution | N/A | N/A | N/A | B+ |
| GameSpot | 7.8/10 | 8.2/10 | 7.8/10 | 8.2/10 |
| GameSpy | N/A | 4/5 | N/A | 4/5 |
| GameTrailers | N/A | 8.8/10 | N/A | N/A |
| GameZone | N/A | 8.5/10 | N/A | 8.4/10 |
| IGN | 8.7/10 | 8.5/10 | 8.8/10 | (AU) 8.7/10 (US) 8.3/10 |
| Official U.S. PlayStation Magazine | 8/10 | 7.5/10 | N/A | N/A |
| Official Xbox Magazine (US) | N/A | N/A | 8/10 | 8.5/10 |
| Detroit Free Press | N/A | N/A | N/A | 3/4 |

NBA 2K7 received "favorable reviews" on all platforms according to the review aggregation website Metacritic.

GameTrailers was particularly positive towards the PlayStation 3 version's overall presentation and gameplay, with the reviewer saying they enjoyed the menu designs, quick load times, refined control schemes, and player animations. The reviewer also commended the amount of content saying: "There's so much content that we wish you luck getting through it all before the inevitable NBA 2K8 takes the court." The reviewer summed up the review by saying: "While it isn't perfect, NBA 2K7 simply offers the most well-rounded, entertaining, and error-free hoops offering this season. Plenty of modes and gameplay depth combine with stunning visuals and presentation to make NBA 2K7 this year's king of the court and a must own for PS3-owning hoops fans." Aaron Thomas of GameSpot said of the same console version: "When everything comes together, NBA 2K7 looks and feels amazing. Watching a player in the low post receive a bounce pass, pivot one way, take a drop step the other, and finally slam the ball home is truly something to behold. Unfortunately, these instances of perfection aren't as frequent as they could be, given the preponderance of nagging gameplay issues. If you already own the game on the Xbox 360, there's no reason to pick it up again on the PlayStation 3. However, if you're looking for a great, well-rounded basketball game for your new PlayStation 3, you'll be pleased with NBA 2K7."

IGN's Jonathan Miller said of the U.S. Xbox 360 version: "NBA 2K7 is a very impressive basketball title. The critically acclaimed gameplay has been improved, especially the defensive AI, yet other areas like defense still need some work. This game is as deep as sports games go, offering not only a great franchise mode but a wealth of options you may never even see. There are so many options that the game is great for hardcore simulation fans and arcade streetball fans alike. If you like basketball, you can't help but enjoy NBA 2K7. Moving forward, 2K needs to make player faces look like human beings, improve some suspect clock AI on the part of the CPU, and work on making on-the-ball defense fun. Still, this is a damn good basketball game and your best option on the 360 this season." Mike Reilly of Game Revolution praised the Xbox 360 version's visuals, gameplay, depth, game modes, sound, online features, and realistic animations, but criticized the menus, calling them "Confusing". "NBA 2K7 is a pleasure to play, or just watch", Reilly said. "The load of modes and options will keep you easily entertained until next season, and the new animations and context-sensitive controls add a never-before-seen layer of realism, even if you have seen everything else before. If you have the cash, this is an easy bucket."

Matt Martin of Eurogamer said of the same console version: "It's deep baby, deeper than The Bee Gees' and Take That's love. It's handsome too. Damn handsome. And it's rich with features, so rich you'll struggle to know where to start, and then have to face up to the possibility that you won't ever get around to exploring everything. It's a sports game that will keep you going for months until the next one arrives, and even then it's going to do itself a disservice by making you seriously question whether you need to buy another yearly upgrade. But if this is the sport you're dedicated to, Visual Concepts has made the game entirely for your pleasure. And it's not very often you can credit a game with giving you a year's worth of play. Go get it." 1UP.com's Todd Zuniga mostly praised the Xbox 360 version's well rounded features. More specifically, Zuniga complimented the game modes, calling them "freakishly deep", as well as the aesthetical details, arena designs, crowd movements, and player animations, saying "the obscene amount of eye candy will have you overlooking [the] flaws." Zuniga also praised the overall gameplay, calling the attention to detail "impressive". Zuniga's main criticisms were minor; he found some player faces "ugly", experienced unfair difficulty spikes while guarding the better players, and disliked the large number of steals that amount during a game. Zuniga wrote: "This is clearly the premier basketball game of the year. In fact, when you match up NBA 2K7 bucket for bucket with Live 07, it's a slaughter. We're talking a 120-48 type of lopsidedness."

Greg Vallentin of VideoGamer.com said of the same console version: "When all is said and done, NBA 2K7 is as well-rounded a basketball game as you can get. 2K7 really isn't a huge improvement over last year's effort, but I doubt anyone will bother to care. Lone players could spend months in the Association mode, and the online options are excellent for players wanting some human-on-human play. At the moment there's only one basketball series worth caring about, and that's NBA 2K."

The Academy of Interactive Arts & Sciences nominated NBA 2K7 for "Sports Game of the Year" at the 10th Annual Interactive Achievement Awards.
