= NBA 2K6 =

2005 video game

- Xbox 360 cover art featuring Shaquille O'Neal
- Developer: Visual Concepts
- Publisher: 2K
- Series: NBA 2K
- Platforms: PlayStation 2, Xbox, Xbox 360
- Release: PlayStation 2, Xbox: NA: September 27, 2005; PAL: March 10, 2006; Xbox 360: NA: November 22, 2005; PAL: April 28, 2006
- Genre: Sports
- Modes: Single-player, multiplayer

NBA 2K6 is a 2005 basketball simulation video game developed by Visual Concepts and published by 2K. It is the seventh installment in the NBA 2K franchise and the successor to ESPN NBA 2K5. It was released in 2005 for PlayStation 2, Xbox, and Xbox 360. Shaquille O'Neal of the Miami Heat is the cover athlete of the game. NBA 2K6 is the predecessor to NBA 2K7 in the NBA 2K series and is the first NBA 2K title to be released by 2K. This is the first game in the series to be released for the Xbox 360.

NBA 2K6 simulates the experience of the National Basketball Association. Players mostly play NBA games with any real-world team, and may customize various aspects. Players play basketball games in a variety of modes, such as quick play, online, and Association. Unlike the other games in the series, the soundtrack does not feature licensed music, and instead features songs made by various artists exclusively for the game. Cover athlete Shaquille O'Neal helped in the marketing and development aspects of the game. O'Neal, among other things, provided the motion capture for several of the in-game animations.

NBA 2K6 received positive reviews from critics upon release. Most positive comments were concerning the player designs, commentary, overall gameplay, and soundtrack, but negative comments were directed at the controls, menus, and the lack of drastic improvements.

== Gameplay ==
NBA 2K6 is a basketball video game that strives to simulate the experience of the National Basketball Association. Players mostly play NBA games with any real world team, and may customize certain aspects, such as the camera angle, sound levels, and sliders, which adjust the realism. Players can play quick games, as well as other game modes, including Association, where players select a team, and play through NBA seasons, customizing various aspects. Players act as the manager of the team, trading players, drafting college players, firing coaches, and playing NBA games of various levels (playoffs, regular season, practice, etc.).

Gameplay-wise, players may play basketball games with the whole team or one player, and will perform all the basic basketball moves that the individual player can perform. The player can dunk, pass, play in the post, run plays, call timeouts, and blocks shots (etc.). The game features many visual and presentation elements that help improve the realism; the game includes commentary, crowd animations, lighting effects, sound effects, and other small details. Kevin Harlan is the play-by-play commentator, Kenny Smith is the colour commentator, and Craig Sager is the sideline reporter.

== Development ==
Shaquille O'Neal is the cover athlete of the game. As well as being the cover athlete, O'Neal also helped with the development of the game's low post gameplay. O'Neal worked with the design teams to help create new animations, providing the motion capture for some of the pump-fakes, drop-steps, and blocks the players in the game perform. O'Neal was once again the cover athlete for NBA 2K7.

NBA 2K6 was released on September 26, 2005, for PlayStation 2 and Xbox, and November 16, 2005, for Xbox 360. This is the first game in the NBA 2K series to be released on the Xbox 360. It is also the first game in the series to be published by 2K and not Sega.

== Soundtrack ==
Unlike the other games in the series, NBA 2K6's songs weren't licensed and were made exclusively for the game. Music for NBA 2K6 includes tracks (primarily hip hop) by the artists; Aceyalone, Aesop Rock, Blackalicious, Common, Hieroglyphics, Little Brother, Lyrics Born, Redman, RJD2, The Roots, and Zion I. The soundtrack CD for NBA 2K6 was released by Decon with the title 2K6: The Tracks. The soundtrack was also promoted with a "2K Sports Bounce Tour".

== Reception ==
Reception

Aggregate score
Aggregator	Score		
Aggregator	PS2	Xbox	Xbox 360
Metacritic	84/100	84/100	81/100

Review scores
Publication	Score		
Publication	PS2	Xbox	Xbox 360
Electronic Gaming Monthly	8.5/10	8.5/10	6/10
Eurogamer	8/10	N/A	N/A
Game Informer	8.5/10	8.5/10	8.5/10
GamePro	N/A	4/5	4/5
GameRevolution	B+	B+	N/A
GameSpot	8.6/10	8.8/10	8.3/10
GameSpy	5/5	5/5	4/5
GameTrailers	N/A	N/A	8.7/10
GameZone	8.5/10	9/10	8/10
IGN	8/10	8/10	7.8/10
Official U.S. PlayStation Magazine	4.5/5	N/A	N/A
Official Xbox Magazine (US)	N/A	7.7/10	8/10
X-Play	4/5	4/5	N/A
Detroit Free Press	4/4	N/A	N/A

NBA 2K6 received "favorable" reviews on all platforms according to the review aggregation website Metacritic.

Matt Leone of 1UP.com complained of the Xbox 360 version's "biggest setback -- it doesn't have the instant visual appeal, next-gen look, or out-and-out raw emotion that gamers want to see in a next-gen sports game. The actual mechanics of the game are quite strong (the shot stick and free throw system are perhaps the best mechanics we've seen in a basketball game to date), and it has all the depth and options we've come to expect from a veteran basketball series. If you're an optimist, NBA 2K6.feels like a natural evolution of the franchise more than something that makes you want to rush out and buy it to show off your shiny new console. If you're a pessimist, well, the game isn't much more than a high-definition port of its excellent current-gen counterparts. Shouldn't we expect more out of a next-gen sports game?" Matt Martin of Eurogamer thought the PlayStation 2 version's soundtrack was "excellent", praised the gameplay for its refinements and additions, liked the Association for its depth, and said the designs of the players are "very realistic". He said that even though some visual aspects are "blocky and rough", such as the crowd, the motion capture and animation is "top notch", which in turn allows players to move like their real life counterpart. Martin did, however, dislike the introduction of a new control scheme, calling it "unnecessary", and said the menus were "ugly" and "broken", wishing there was a more simple system in place.

IGN's Jonathan Miller said of the Xbox 360 version: "In the end, NBA 2K6 is a solid basketball title that really rests on the laurels of its predecessors. Even though the game can look absolutely amazing at time, it's still, at its heart, the same exact game that we saw in the current generation. While 2K6 was a very good game on those consoles, we want to be blown away by our next-generation games. Someone who already owns the current-gen version will be hard pressed to drop $59.99 on this version, but those new to the series may want to look into it. It's still the best basketball title on the 360. Unfortunately, that isn't saying too much." Ronnie Hobbs of GameZone felt the gameplay of the same console version was good, but could have been better, thought the player's designs were "unbelievably life-like", but other visuals, such as the court, were lacking, praised the commentary, calling it "perfection", and liked the "fun" online modes, even if partially plagued by technical issues. Hobbs summed up the review by saying: "In my opinion NBA 2K6 is the best basketball game available on the 360, but whether it's worth the $59.99 price tag is going to be up to you. The decision is a no-brainer for people who don't already own it on the Xbox or PS2, but for those who have played it before, the slick presentation just might not be enough to warrant an upgrade."

Bob Colayco of GameSpot said of the PlayStation 2 and Xbox versions: "NBA 2K6 isn't for the casual basketball fan who doesn't know a pick and roll from picking his nose. The difficulty of the game, and new interface nuances, may be a little overwhelming for someone who's more attuned to something like NBA Jam or NBA Street. But for those looking for a quality simulation basketball experience, NBA 2K6 is a resounding slam dunk and is easily recommendable to any fan of the series or to any hardcore basketball fan in general." VideoGamer.com's Greg Vallentin praised the simulation gameplay and the amount of content, but criticized the Xbox 360 version for not offering enough improvements. He stated: "NBA 2K6, like its predecessors, delivers a solid simulation basketball game that's worth picking up if you've got a hankering for the sport, not to mention the fact that's it's incredibly affordable."

During the 9th Annual Interactive Achievement Awards, the Academy of Interactive Arts & Sciences nominated NBA 2K6 for "Sports Game of the Year", which was ultimately awarded to SSX On Tour.
