= Break of Dawn =

Break of Dawn may refer to:

- The time of the morning when dawn occurs:

== Film ==
- Break of Dawn, a 1987 film, see List of Chicano films
- Break of Dawn, a 2002 film, see Alexandre Arcady

== Albums ==
- Break of Dawn (Do As Infinity album), 2000
- Break of Dawn (Rob Base & DJ E-Z Rock album), 1994
- Break of Dawn (Goapele album), 2011
- Break of Dawn, a 1982 album by Firefall

== Songs ==
- "Break of Dawn" (song), a 2010 song by Swedish singer Eric Saade
- "Break of Dawn", a song by Michael Jackson from the 2001 album Invincible
- "Break of Dawn", a song by Breakbot from the 2012 album By Your Side
- "Break Of Dawn", a song British rapper Sainté

== Other ==
- Break of Dawn (manga), a 2011 manga series by Tetsuya Imai
- Break of Dawn, the tugboat that escorted the trash barge Mobro 4000 in 1987
