= Leanin' on Slick =

Studio album by Aceyalone
- Released: May 28, 2013
- Genre: Hip hop
- Length: 40:12
- Label: Decon
- Producer: Bionik

Aceyalone chronology
Aceyalone & the Lonely Ones (2009)	Leanin' on Slick (2013)	Action (2015)

Leanin' on Slick is the tenth studio album by American rapper Aceyalone. It was released on Decon in 2013. The music video for the title track was filmed in Cuba and directed by Jason Goldwatch.

== Critical reception ==
Professional ratings
Review scores
Source	Rating
AllMusic	4/5 stars
Exclaim!	7/10
PopMatters	5/10

Thomas Quinlan of Exclaim! described the album as "a fun, funky feel-good album for the summer." Logan Smithson of PopMatters said, "It's probably easier to appreciate Leanin' on Slick if you're older or a die-hard fan of Aceylone, but it's probably not a great album no matter what angle you're listening from."

AllMusic named it as one of their "Favorite Hip-Hop/Rap Albums of 2013".

== Track listing ==
No.	Title	Length
1.	"30 and Up"	2:54
2.	"Leanin' on Slick"	3:27
3.	"I Can Get It Myself" (featuring Bionik)	2:45
4.	"What You Gone Do with That"	3:08
5.	"One Cup, Two Cup"	2:25
6.	"Cold Piece"	3:24
7.	"Pass the Hint"	3:06
8.	"I'm No Cassanova"	3:13
9.	"Show Me Them Shoes"	3:13
10.	"Workin' Man's Blues" (featuring Cee Lo Green)	3:11
11.	"Boss"	2:35
12.	"Things Get Better" (featuring Daniel Merriweather)	4:03
13.	"Hit the Road" (featuring Bionik and Treasure Davis)	2:48
