= Goapele =

American singer (born 1977)

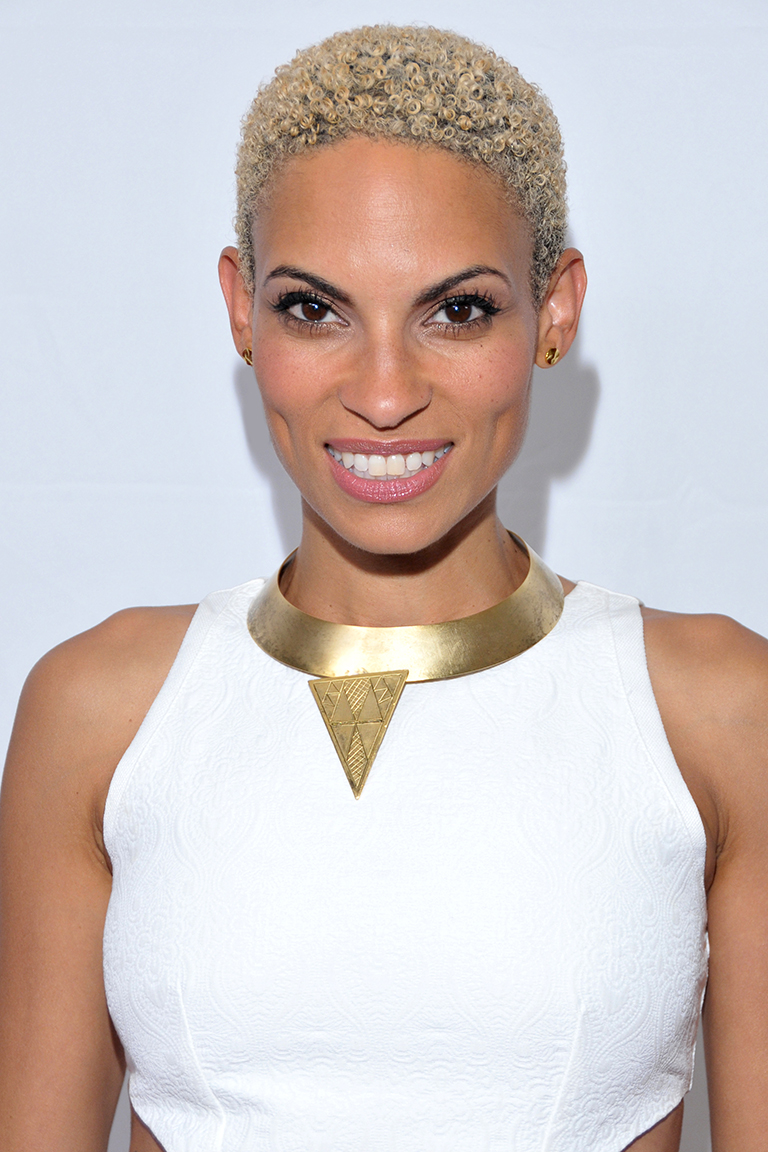
- Goapele in 2015

Background information
- Born: Goapele Mohlabane; July 11, 1977 (age 49)
- Origin: Oakland, California, U.S.
- Genres: R&B; neo soul; trip hop
- Instrument: Vocals
- Years active: 1999–present
- Labels: Skyblaze; Hieroglyphics Imperium; Columbia; Decon; Jordan House; Primary Wave
- Website: Goapele.com

Goapele Mohlabane (/ˈɡwɑːpəleɪ/ GWAH-pə-lay; born July 11, 1977) is an American soul and R&B singer-songwriter. Her name means to move forward in Setswana, a Southern African language.

== Early life ==
Goapele's South African father Douglas Mohlabane was an exiled political activist who struggled against the Apartheid System. Goapele's New York-born German Jewish mother Noa had been attending protests since the age of 12. Noa attended Friends World College and was studying in Nairobi, Kenya, where she met and married Douglas. Goapele and her older brother DJ Namane Mohlabane were raised in a South African exile community in California.

Both of her parents inspired Goapele to become very involved in community affairs at a young age. She attended the Berkeley Arts Magnet School, where she led a pre-teen peer-support group. She also became involved in various groups and organizations that combated racism and sexism.

Goapele and Theo Rodrigues have a daughter together.

== Career ==
=== Even Closer ===
Goapele returned to Oakland after her time at Berklee College of Music, where she concentrated on writing and recording songs. In 2001, she self-released her debut album, Closer, which sold 5,000 copies. At the same time, she was building a devoted audience through her popular live performances in the San Francisco Bay Area. "Closer" peaked at No. 63 on Billboard's Top R&B/Hip-Hop Albums chart.

In 2002, she reworked Closer, adding five new songs. With the help of her family, she formed her own independent label, Skyblaze Recordings, to oversee her musical career. She released her first nationally distributed album, Even Closer, featuring the single "Closer," through Hieroglyphics Imperium Recordings. "Closer" was also featured on the soundtrack of the 2003 movie Honey. In 2004, Columbia/SME picked up Skyblaze Recordings for worldwide distribution and rereleased the album with additional tracks. She co-wrote and co-produced the entire album, which is a mixture of neo-soul, trip hop, lieder, and jazz. She also toured North America with the band Spearhead. In 2004, Even Closer peaked at No. 24 on the Billboard Charts for Top Independent Albums.

=== Change It All ===
Her second album, Change It All, featuring the single "First Love" and the song "Love Me Right," was released December 2005. The album featured production work from Jeff Bhasker, Mike Tiger, Amp Live, Sa-Ra Creative Partners, and Linda Perry. In 2006 the album peaked at No. 32 on the Billboard Top R&B/Hip Hop Album Charts and No. 2 on the Top Heatseekers while the single "First Love" reached No. 18 on the Hot Adult R&B Airplay. Goapele appeared on Soul Train to promote the album in May 2006, in what turned out to be the show's final new episode. She also appeared on The Orlando Jones Show, Jimmy Kimmel Live!, Late Night with Conan O'Brien, ABC View from The Bay and FOX Good Day Atlanta. Her first three releases have garnered praise from the likes of magazines such as Rolling Stone, Nylon, Interview, Marie Claire, Billboard, Essence, and Vibe. She has appeared on the covers of local Bay Area publications San Francisco Magazine, Diablo Magazine, East Bay Express, SF Bay Guardian, Mugshot Magazine, and City Flight, She was named the number-5 artist to watch in the July 2003 issue of Rolling Stone magazine, made the countdown on MTV’s Top 10 Artists to Watch, and collaborated with ALDO Shoes’ advertisement campaign in its fight against HIV/AIDS, which featured artists such as Avril Lavigne, Ludacris, Dave Navarro, Charlize Theron, Pink, Eve, Rosario Dawson, Eva Mendes, Bow Wow, Ziggy Marley, and Kelly Rowland.

=== Break of Dawn ===
On July 10, 2009, Skyblaze Recordings leaked the single "Milk & Honey" (produced by Bedrock), the first single from her third studio album of the same title. However, in August 2011, she announced that the album would be titled Break of Dawn. The album is being recorded at the Zoo, home of Goapele's Oakland-based Skylight Studios and will feature production from Drumma Boy, Bedrock, Kanye West, Dan Electric, Mike Tiger, Bobby Ozuna (Raphael Saadiq, John Mayer, Erykah Badu), Malay (John Legend, Mary J. Blige), Kerry "Krucial" Brothers ( Alicia Keys, Mario, Keshia Cole, Nas), Jeff Bhasker (The Game, Kanye West, Ludacris, T.I), and other guest musicians. After many delays, the album was finally released on October 25, 2011.

=== Victory ===
In celebration of the FIFA World Cup 2010 in South Africa Goapele released the single "Victory" featuring South African emcee Hip Hop Pantsula, a prelude to her upcoming musical project Victory, which was released in Winter 2010 and feature an array of artists from the African continent as well as throughout the Diaspora. The leading track was recorded in English, Setswana, and Xhosa, and tries to draw attention to the need for education and resources to combat Africa's most crucial dilemmas. The album will also encompass philanthropy, political and social activism. Proceeds from the project went to ANSA (Artists for a New South Africa) a non-profit organization working to combat HIV/AIDS, assist children orphaned by the disease, advance human and civil rights, educate and empower youth and build bonds between the U.S. and South Africa through arts and culture.

In 2014, Goapele signed with singer Eric Benét's record label Jordan House and is in the process of recording new material for her new label.

=== Strong as Glass ===
In 2014, Goapele released Strong as Glass, her fifth studio album. The lead single was "Hey, Boy" featuring Snoop Dogg and the video was released September 10, 2014, on YouTube.

=== Collaborations ===
Apart from her solo work, she has collaborated with West Coast MCs such as Aceyalone, E-40, Zion-I, and Mac Mall; those involved in the Hieroglyphics Crew; Cassper Nyovest South African rapper, Detroit based vocalist Dwele; and Clyde Carson and Mos Def on the track "Different”.

== Human rights work ==
Goapele performed at rallies, demonstrations, and various political events around the world from Cuba to South Africa. On September 14, 2006, the California-based Ella Baker Center for Human Rights honored her with its first ever Human Rights Cultural Hero Award during the center's 10th-anniversary celebration, which was titled "Tribute to a Dream." The following statement was issued by the Center regarding the award:

We are proud to name internationally acclaimed, Oakland-based [singer-songwriter] Goapele the first recipient of this award. But as successful as she is, Goapele remains deeply rooted in her home community and in the struggle for human rights. We first saw her sing at rallies and demonstrations when both she and Ella Baker Center were just starting out. Today, she is still here with us, side by side, looking forward to a better day for all of our people.

The Ella Baker Center for Human Rights is a non-profit strategy and action center. The stated aim of the center is to work for justice, opportunity, and peace in urban America.

== Discography ==
Studio albums

- Closer (Goapele Music, 2001)
- Even Closer (Skyblaze/Columbia/SME, 2002)
- Change It All (Skyblaze/Columbia/SBMG, 2005)
- Break of Dawn (Skyblaze/Decon, 2011)
- Strong as Glass (Skyblaze/Primary Wave/BMG Rights Management, 2014)
- DreamSeeker (Skyblaze/Primary Wave/Empire, 2017)
- Colours (Skyblaze, 2023)

Singles

- "Closer" (2002)
- "Got It" (2003)
- "First Love" (2005)
- "Love Me Right" (2006)
- "Soweto" (featuring Hieroglyphics) (2008)
- "Chocolate" (2008)
- "Milk & Honey" (2009)
- "Victory" (featuring Hip Hop Pantsula) (2010)
- "Undertow" (2013)
- "Hey, Boy" (2014)

Guest appearances

- Hieroglyphics – "Make Your Move" from Full Circle (2003)
- J Boogie's Dubtronic Science – "Try Me" from J Boogie's Dubtronic Science (2003)
- E-40 – "Show & Prove" from Breakin' News (2003)
- Triple Threat – "How U Talkin?" from Many Styles (2003)
- Aceyalone – "Moonlit Skies" from Love & Hate (2003)
- Planet Asia – "Upside Down" from The Grand Opening (2004)
- Tajai – "Dedication" from Power Movement (2004)
- SupremeEx & Tajai – "Meaning" from Nuntype (2005)
- The Team – "Sunshine" from World Premiere (2005)
- Amir Sulaiman – "They Don't Know" from Like a Thief in the Night (2007)
- Zion I – "Life's Work" from Shadowboxing (2012)
- Ben Williams – "Voice of Freedom" from Coming of Age (2015)
- Cassper Nyovest – "Destiny" from "Thuto" (2017)
