= Gangrene (group) =

American hip-hop duo

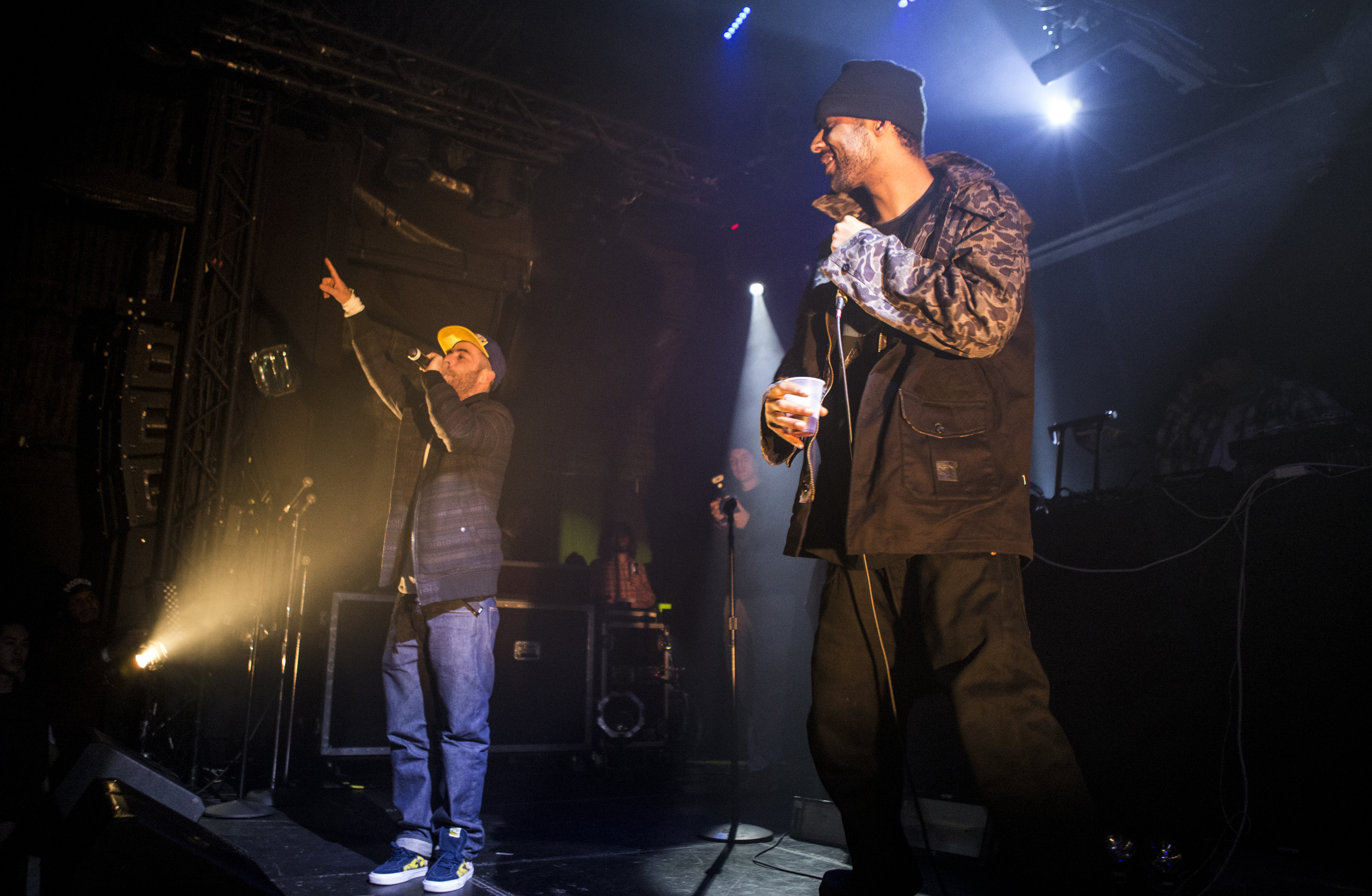
- The Alchemist and Oh No of Gangrene performing in March 2014

Background information
- Origin: Beverly Hills, California, U.S.
- Genres: Hip-hop; electronic; trip hop
- Years active: 2009–present
- Labels: Decon; Mass Appeal
- Members: The Alchemist; Oh No

Gangrene is an American musical duo consisting of rappers/producers The Alchemist and Oh No.

In 2013, Gangrene, together with Tangerine Dream and Woody Jackson scored and composed the original score for Grand Theft Auto V by Rockstar Games.

== Discography ==
=== Studio albums ===
- Gutter Water (2010)
- Vodka & Ayahuasca (2012)
- You Disgust Me (2015)
- Heads I Win, Tails You Lose (2024)
- Better Than McDonald's (2026)

=== Compilations ===
- Welcome to Los Santos (2015)

=== EPs ===
- Sawblade (2010)
- Greneberg (2011) (with Roc Marciano)
- Odditorium (2012)

== Singles and music videos ==
- "The Sickness" (2010)
- "Not High Enough" (2010)
- "Chain Swinging" (2010)
- "Take Drugs" (2010)
- "All Bad" (2010)
- "Dump Truck" (2011)
- "Vodka & Ayahuaska" (2012)
- "Oxnard Water Torture" (2023)
- "Royal Hand" (2023)
