= NBA 2K8 =

2007 basketball video game

- PlayStation 3 cover art featuring Chris Paul
- Developer: Visual Concepts
- Publishers: 2K; Spike (JP)
- Series: NBA 2K
- Platforms: PlayStation 2 PlayStation 3 Xbox 360
- Release: NA: October 2, 2007; AU: October 31, 2007; AU: November 1, 2007 (X360); EU: November 2, 2007 (X360); EU: November 23, 2007; JP: August 7, 2008 (PS3, X360)
- Genre: Sports
- Modes: Single-player, multiplayer

NBA 2K8 is a 2007 basketball simulation video game developed by Visual Concepts and published by 2K and Spike. It is the ninth installment in the NBA 2K franchise and the successor to NBA 2K7. It was released in 2007 for PlayStation 2, PlayStation 3, and Xbox 360. Chris Paul of the New Orleans Hornets is the cover athlete of the game. NBA 2K8 is the predecessor to NBA 2K9 in the NBA 2K series.

NBA 2K8 was well received upon release. Critics mostly praised the aesthetical details, particularly the player animations, as well as the game mode options, and overall gameplay, more specifically, the post play, jump shooting, and well rounded accessibility.

== Gameplay ==
NBA 2K8 is a basketball simulation game which strives to emulate the National Basketball Association and the sport of basketball in general. Players mostly play NBA basketball games in a variety of game modes, with real teams and players or created players. One of the new additions to the game is the Slam Dunk Contest game mode. During games, Kevin Harlan is the play-by-play commentator, this is the last game in the NBA 2K series to have Kenny Smith as the color commentator, he would make a return in the pre-game and halftime shows of NBA 2K16, and Craig Sager as the sideline reporter.

== Development and release ==
Chris Paul is the cover athlete of NBA 2K8. NBA 2K8 was released for the PlayStation 2, PlayStation 3, and Xbox 360 video game consoles in North America on October 2, 2007.

== Soundtrack ==
The game features a soundtrack consisting of 23 licensed songs. The developers aimed to create genre diversity when composing the soundtrack. In 2006, J Dilla passed away since he and Madlib recorded the song, "The Official", from the 2003 album, Champion Sound. It was remixed for the game.

== Reception ==
Reception

Aggregate score
Aggregator	Score		
Aggregator	PS2	PS3	Xbox 360
Metacritic	72/100	81/100	81/100

Review scores
Publication	Score		
Publication	PS2	PS3	Xbox 360
Famitsu	N/A	24/40	24/40
Game Informer	N/A	8.25/10	8.25/10
GameRevolution	N/A	B−	B−
GameSpot	6.5/10	8.5/10	8.5/10
GameSpy	3.5/5	N/A	4/5
GameTrailers	N/A	8/10	8/10
GameZone	N/A	8.7/10	8.7/10
IGN	7.5/10	7.9/10	7.9/10
PlayStation Official Magazine – UK	8/10	8/10	N/A
Official Xbox Magazine (US)	N/A	N/A	8.5/10
411Mania	N/A	N/A	9.3/10
USA Today	N/A	8.5/10	8.5/10

The PlayStation 3 and Xbox 360 versions of NBA 2K8 received "favorable" reviews, while the PlayStation 2 version received "average" reviews, according to the review aggregation website Metacritic. In Japan, Famitsu gave the PS3 and Xbox 360 versions a score of one five, one seven, one five, and one seven for a total of 24 out of 40.

IGN's Hilary Goldstein said of the same console versions: "In many ways, NBA 2K8 is an improved game on the court. But there are a lot of minor issues that really drag it down. Over the course of my first dozen games, I was in love. But as the season wore on, the issues began piling up to a point that it became a source of frustration. The Lock-on D gaff is inexcusable and the lackluster defensive AI allows decent players to tear it up on offense. Jason Williams should not be dropping 30 points a game. Yet he won the MVP in year two of my franchise. Still, any hoops fan should give NBA 2K8 a look. It's certainly the best basketball game on any system this year. The Association is a solid franchise mode and, if [Virtual Concepts] can iron out its AI and gameplay issues, next year's model could be something very special."

1UP.com's Todd Zuniga commended the aesthetics, depth, game modes, and online features of the PS3 and Xbox 360 versions, but disliked certain gameplay imperfections that he deemed small and annoying, such as the unrealistic defensive abilities of big men when they are defending quick players. Aaron Thomas of GameSpot praised the same console versions for having a large amount of content, the CPU, and the new additions to the game. In his review for Game Revolution, Chris Andrien wrote of the same console versions: "At the end of the day, NBA 2K8 is a pretty fun jaunt." He spoke well of the sound effects, but hated the "goofy" commentary. He liked the addition of NBA legends such as Larry Bird, but disliked certain other gameplay additions, including the "unrealistic" lock-on defense. Lastly, Andrien praised the realistic visuals and animations, but criticized the "wonky" artificial intelligence.

It's rare that a series takes as serious a step backwards as NBA 2K8 has this season. It's missing modes and gameplay features from last year's game, while adding subtle changes that few players will notice or make use of. Last year the 2K series was the best roundball game on the market by a landslide. This year, it's dribbled the ball out of bounds with no defender in sight.

— GameTrailers

GameTrailers complimented the same console versions' dunk contest game mode, praised the "incredible online" play, called the post play "the best in the biz", said the shooting felt "just right", and enjoyed the animations. However, the review cited several "quirks", such as AI issues, players unrealistically missing shots or attempting shots that wouldn't realistically be used, statistical problems, removed features, and the lock-on defense mechanic, as downsides. Lastly, the review also heavily criticized the designs of the players and the menus, calling them "awful" and "butchered", as well as the "repetitive" commentary, but did enjoy the soundtrack and said the amount of animations "makes a huge difference".

During the 11th Annual Interactive Achievement Awards, NBA 2K8 received a nomination for "Sports Game of the Year" by the Academy of Interactive Arts & Sciences.
