= Even Closer =

Studio album by Goapele
- Released: September 10, 2002
- Genre: Neo soul
- Length: 50:36
- Labels: Skyblaze; Columbia; BBE
- Producers: Adam Smirnoff; Amp Live; Eric Krasno; Jeff Bhasker; Johnson; Mike Tiger; Nate Greenberg; Shaka Ramsay; Soulive

Goapele chronology
| Closer (2001) | Even Closer (2002) | Change It All (2005) |

Singles from Even Closer
- 1. "Closer" Released: 2002; 2. "Got It" Released: 2003

Professional ratings
Review scores
| Source | Rating |
|---|---|
| AllMusic | 3/5 stars |
| Exclaim! | mixed |
| PopMatters | favorable |

Even Closer is the second studio album by American singer-songwriter Goapele. It is essentially an expanded version of her self-released debut album, Closer (2001). Originally released in 2002, it was re-released in 2004.

== Critical reception ==
Todd Kristel of AllMusic gave the album 3 stars out of 5, commenting that it treads "a thin line between appealingly eclectic and insufficiently cohesive". Mark Anthony Neal of PopMatters said: "Nothing on Goapele's Even Closer is likely to ever be an MTV buzzclip, but throughout her debut she exhibits striking vocals and solid song writing skills, suggesting that she will be a figure that will be heard from again and again, likely outlasting many of her neo-soul peers and some of the independent labels they record for."

Meanwhile, Cheryl Thompson of Exclaim! commented that "[the] only problem with the album is the one tone Goapele maintains throughout; each track on its own is conceivably thought-provoking, a testament to Goapele's writing abilities but as a commercial package it lacks a certain positive transgression into the realm of something new."

== Track listing ==
| No. | Title | Producer(s) | Length |
|---|---|---|---|
| 1. | "Closer" | Amp Live; Mike Tiger | 3:49 |
| 2. | "Ease Your Mind" (featuring Pep Love) | Johnson | 3:35 |
| 3. | "Got It" | Amp Live | 3:15 |
| 4. | "Romantic" | Soulive | 5:37 |
| 5. | "Too Much the Same" | Eric Krasno | 3:56 |
| 6. | "Catch 22" | Nate Greenberg; Shaka Ramsay | 4:09 |
| 7. | "The Daze" (featuring Zion I and Casual) | Amp Live | 3:07 |
| 8. | "Things Don't Exist" | Adam Smirnoff; Jeff Bhasker | 4:32 |
| 9. | "Childhood Drama" | Johnson | 3:14 |
| 10. | "Salvation" | Jeff Bhasker | 3:43 |
| 11. | "Back to You" | Nate Greenberg | 4:17 |
| 12. | "Butterflykisses" | Jeff Bhasker | 3:20 |
| 13. | "It Takes More" | Johnson | 3:57 |
| 14. | "Red, White, & Blues" | Mike Tiger | 5:29 |
| 15. | "Childhood Drama (Remix)" (2004 re-release bonus track) | Johnson | 3:24 |

== Charts ==
| Chart | Peak position |
|---|---|
| US Top R&B/Hip-Hop Albums (Billboard) | 60 |
| US Heatseekers Albums (Billboard) | 41 |
| US Independent Albums (Billboard) | 24 |
