= Aceyalone & the Lonely Ones =

Studio album by Aceyalone
- Released: March 31, 2009
- Genre: Hip hop
- Length: 29:42
- Label: Decon
- Producer: Bionik

Aceyalone chronology
Lightning Strikes (2007)	Aceyalone & the Lonely Ones (2009)	Leanin' on Slick (2013)

Aceyalone & the Lonely Ones is the ninth studio album by American rapper Aceyalone. It was released on Decon in 2009.

== Critical reception ==
Professional ratings
Review scores
Source	Rating
AllMusic	3.5/5 stars
Exclaim!	mixed
PopMatters	7/10 stars
Spin	favorable

Andrew Martin of PopMatters said, "A few missteps aside, this record remains a refreshing and creative take on an experiment that could have easily failed." Thomas Quinlan of Exclaim! said, "What really holds this album together is the live band feel that's also applied to the doo-wop and R&B choruses." Mosi Reeves of Spin called it "one of the year's most unexpected hip-hop pleasures, with the Los Angeles MC switching gears from his inventive and hugely influential rapid-fire rhyme style."

== Track listing ==
No.	Title	Length
1.	"Live at the Firehouse Intro"	1:30
2.	"Lonely Ones" (featuring Bionik)	3:23
3.	"Can't Hold Back" (featuring Treasure Davis)	3:33
4.	"What It Was" (featuring Bionik)	2:32
5.	"On the One"	2:31
6.	"Step Up" (featuring Treasure Davis)	2:49
7.	"2 the Top (Remix)"	3:06
8.	"Workin' Man's Blues" (featuring Bionik)	2:58
9.	"Power to the People" (featuring Candis Francis and Storm Daniels)	3:00
10.	"Push n' Pull"	3:00
11.	"Outro" (featuring Bionik Quartet)	1:20
