= Coup de Theatre (album) =

Studio album by Haiku d'Etat
- Released: October 19, 2004
- Studio: Ab's crib; Studio 880 (Oakland, CA)
- Genre: Hip-hop
- Length: 55:28
- Label: Project Blowed; Decon
- Producer: Chief Xcel; DJ Drez; Fat Jack; Kenny Segal; Myka 9; PMG; The Istickz

Haiku d'Etat chronology
Haiku d'Etat (1999)	Coup de Theatre (2004)

Singles from Coup de Theatre
- 1. "Mike, Aaron & Eddie" Released: 2004; 2. "Triumvirate" / "Top Qualified" Released: 2005

Coup de Theatre is the second studio album by American hip-hop group Haiku d'Etat. It was released on October 19, 2004, via Decon. Recording sessions took place at Abstract Rude's crib and at Studio 880 in Oakland. Produced by Fat Jack, Myka 9, Chief Xcel, DJ Drez, Kenny Segal, PMG and Spacek, it features guest appearances from Blackalicious, Busdriver and Latyrx.

== Critical reception ==
Professional ratings
Review scores
Source	Rating
AllHipHop	3.5/5 stars
AllMusic	3/5 stars
Entertainment Weekly	A−
Prefix	7/10
RapReviews	8/10
Tiny Mix Tapes	3.5/5 marks

Dominic Umile of Prefix gave the album a 7.0 out of 10, commenting that "Coup de Theatre, the second course, parts the sea of mediocre major-label nonsense with refreshingly mixed backgrounds and introspective, melodious and often humorous verse". Steve Juon of RapReviews.com gave the album an 8 out of 10, saying: "With so many things going for Haiku D'Etat, it's almost hard to find fault with this album".

Gabe Meline of North Bay Bohemian named it one of the best hip hop albums of 2004. Jeff Ryce of HipHopDX included it on the "Independent Albums of the Year" list.

== Track listing ==
All tracks are written by Edwin Hayes, Michael Troy and Aaron Pointer, except track 6 is written with Regan Farquhar, and track 10 is written with Timothy Parker, Tsutomu Shimura and Lateef Daumont.

No.	Title	Producer(s)	Length
1.	"Intro"	DJ Drez	1:24
2.	"Mike, Aaron & Eddie"	Fat Jack	4:05
3.	"Kats"	Fat Jack	4:22
4.	"Dogs"	Mikah 9	3:48
5.	"Stoic Response"	The Istickz	3:26
6.	"Transitions & Eras" (featuring Busdriver)	Fat Jack	4:59
7.	"All Good Things"	Fat Jack	3:51
8.	"Poetry Takeover"	Mikah 9	3:59
9.	"Triumvirate"	PMG	3:48
10.	"Top Qualified" (featuring Blackalicious, Lyrics Born and Lateef)	Chief Xcel	5:32
11.	"Coup de Theatre"	Kenny Segal	5:49
12.	"Built 2 Last"	Fat Jack	5:16
13.	Untitled		5:09
Total length:			55:28

== Personnel ==
- Edwin M. "Aceyalone" Hayes Jr. — vocals, recording (tracks: 1–8, 10–12), executive producer
- Michael L. "Mikah 9" Troy — vocals, producer (tracks: 4, 8), recording (tracks: 1–8, 10–12)
- Aaron "Abstract Rude" Pointer — vocals, recording (tracks: 1–8, 10–12)
- Nikko Bradley — vocals (track 1)
- Regan "Busdriver" Farquhar — vocals (track 6)
- Timothy "Gift of Gab" Parker — vocals (track 10)
- Tsutomu "Lyrics Born" Shimura — vocals (track 10)
- Lateef "The Truthspeaker" Daumont — vocals (track 10)
- Steven "DJ Drez" Bradley — scratches (tracks: 1–4, 6, 8, 9, 12), producer (track 1)
- James "Fat Jack" Clark — producer (tracks: 2, 3, 6, 7, 12)
- Morgan "Spacek" Zarate — producer (track 5)
- Richard "Ruk" Garcia — producer (track 9)
- Tony "T-Nyse" Minter — producer (track 9)
- Xavier "Chief Xcel" Mosley — producer, recording & mixing (track 10)
- Kenny "Syndakit" Segal — producer (track 11)
- "Bigg John" Myers — mixing (tracks: 1–8, 10–12)
- Mike Cresswell — engineering (track 10)
- Peter Bittenbender — executive producer
- James Sheehan — art direction, design
- Ben Liebenberg — photography
- Casey Bridges — photography
