= Gutter Water =

Studio album by Gangrene
- Released: November 22, 2010
- Recorded: 2006–2010
- Genre: Hip-hop
- Length: 48:49
- Label: Decon
- Producer: Alchemist; Oh No

Gangrene chronology
Gutter Water (2010)	Vodka & Ayahuasca (2012)

Singles from Gutter Water
- 1. "Not High Enough" Released: September 7, 2010; 2. "Chain Swinging" Released: October 12, 2010

Professional ratings
Review scores
Source	Rating
HipHopDX	3/5
laut.de	3/5 stars
Pitchfork	6.7/10
PopMatters	5/10
Spin	7/10 marks

Gutter Water is the debut full-length studio album by American hip-hop duo Gangrene. It was released on November 22, 2010, via Decon. Production was handled by members Oh No and Alchemist, with DJ Muro co-producing one song. It features guest appearances from Big Twins, Evidence, Fashawn, Guilty Simpson, Medaphoar, Planet Asia, Raekwon and Roc C.

== Critical reception ==
In his review for Spin, Christopher R. Weingarten made comparisons with Champion Sound, saying that the album "has none of Jaylib muted minimalism, opting for a barrage of manic rhymes and delirious clattering noise - haunted-house pianos, car crashes, backmasked ickiness, end-times news broadcasts, Godzilla whines, convulsive turntablism, and even the YouTube clip of a cop eating pot brownies". Tom Breihan of Pitchfork wrote: "rapping on Gutter Water is almost beside the point. Oh and Alc are producers first, and Gutter Water would work nearly as well as an instrumental album. And together, they've created a messy, impressive pile-up of half-broken piano loops and dense, clattery drum programming. It's a hazy, stoned piece of work, an expansive extended head-nod, everything it sets out to be". Sean Ryon of HipHopDX found the album "an unrelenting head banger that cleverly blends the best elements of California's underground Hip Hop scene. Lyrical setbacks aside, Gangrene's debut is an infectious combo of Alc's Kevlar-tough street anthems and Oh's musically off-kilter production". Alex Bahler of PopMatters resumed: "despite Gangrene's (worthwhile) commitment to keeping it realer than radio, the visual metaphor on Gutter Water is a stretch: the music isn't shit, but it's not the shit either".

== Track listing ==
No.	Title	Writer(s)	Producer(s)	Length
1.	"Intro"	Michael Jackson; Alan Maman	Oh No	1:03
2.	"Boss Shit"	Jackson; Maman	Oh No	2:32
3.	"Not High Enough"	Jackson; Maman	The Alchemist	3:19
4.	"Gutter Water" (featuring Raekwon)	Jackson; Maman; Corey Woods	The Alchemist; DJ Muro (co.)	3:16
5.	"Get Into Some Gangster Shit" (featuring Planet Asia)	Jackson; Maman; Jason Green	The Alchemist	3:47
6.	"Take Drugs"	Jackson; Maman	Oh No	3:52
7.	"Chain Swinging"	Jackson; Maman	The Alchemist	2:44
8.	"Wassup Wassup" (featuring Fashawn and Evidence)	Jackson; Maman; Santiago Leyva; Michael Perretta	Oh No	2:29
9.	"All Bad"	Jackson; Maman	Oh No	4:54
10.	"Breathing Down Yo Neck" (featuring MED)	Jackson; Maman; Nicholas Rodriguez	The Alchemist	3:12
11.	"From Another Orbit" (featuring Roc C)	Jackson; Maman; Damien Smith	The Alchemist	3:43
12.	"Ransom"	Jackson; Maman	Oh No	3:19
13.	"Standing in the Shadows"	Jackson; Maman	The Alchemist	2:37
14.	"Brass Knuckle Rap" (featuring Guilty Simpson)	Jackson; Maman; Byron Simpson	The Alchemist	4:37
15.	"Not Leaving" (featuring Big Twins)	Jackson; Maman; Jamal Abdul Raheem	Oh No	3:26
Total length:				48:49

== Personnel ==
- Michael "Oh No" Jackson – lyrics, vocals, producer (tracks: 1, 2, 6, 8, 9, 12, 15), arranger
- Alan "The Alchemist" Maman – lyrics, vocals, producer (tracks: 3–5, 7, 10, 11, 13, 14), arranger
- Corey "Raekwon" Woods – lyrics & vocals (track 4)
- Jason "Planet Asia" Green – lyrics & vocals (track 5)
- Santiago "Fashawn" Leyva – lyrics & vocals (track 8)
- Michael "Evidence" Perretta – lyrics & vocals (track 8)
- Nicholas "M.E.D." Rodriguez – lyrics & vocals (track 10)
- Damien "Roc C" Smith – lyrics & vocals (track 11)
- Byron "Guilty" Simpson – lyrics & vocals (track 14)
- Jamal "Big Twins"/"Twin Gambino" Abdul Raheem – lyrics & vocals (track 15)
- Romeo "DJ Romes" Jimenez – scratches (tracks: 2, 7, 9)
- Murota "DJ Muro" Takayoshi – co-producer (track 4)
- Ricardo Gutierrez – mastering
- Dan Park – art direction, illustration
- Peter Bittenbender – art direction
