= Taktloss =

German rapper (1975)

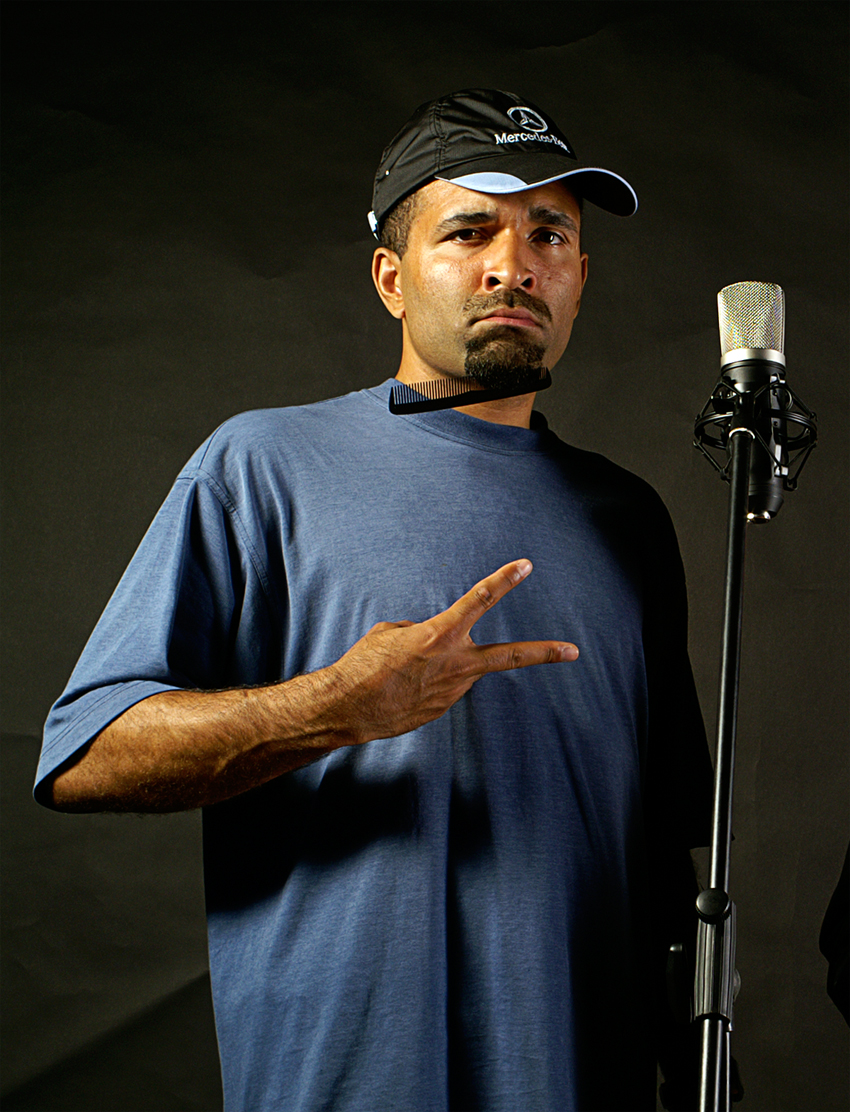

Background information
- Born: Kingsly Defounga; 4 July 1975 (age 50); Berlin, Germany
- Genres: German rap, battle rap
- Label: Fick die Biaaatch Rekordz
- Website: taktloss.de

Kingsly Defounga (born 4 July 1975), better known under his stage name Taktloss, is a German rapper.

== Biography ==
In 2004, he released These Walls EP, which was recorded with American rapper Abstract Rude. In 2005, he released with MC Basstard the album Dogma (Gegen die Zeit), the album was produced by Skome, Keyza Soze, Mach One and others. Together with fellow rapper Justus, they released the album Aus Liebe in 2006. In 2007, Taktloss collaborated with rapper The Rifleman and released an album titled WWW.

He is of Congolese descent.

== Discography ==
=== Tapes ===
- 1997: Hoes, Flows, Moneytoes (with Kool Savas as Westberlin Maskulin)
- 1997: BRP 1 [BattleReimPriorität 1]
- 1998: BRP 2 [BattleReimPriorität 2]

=== Solo projects ===
- 1999: BRP 3 [BattleReimPriorität 3]
- 2000: BRP 4 Life [BattleReimPriorität 4 Life]
- 2001: BRP 7 [BattleReimPriorität Nr. 7]
- 2003: Mix mir daz Tape vom Tot (aka DJ Ugly Cut)
- 2003: Nichtz geht mehr (aka DJ Ugly Cut)
- 2003: Phuk die Beeatch/Sonnenschein
- 2004: BRP 56 [BattleReimPriorität 56]
- 2004: Hatz drauf (aka DJ Ugly Cut)

=== Collaboration ===
- 1999: Hoes, Flows, Moneytoes LP (with Kool Savas as Westberlin Maskulin)
- 2000: Battlekings (with Kool Savas as Westberlin Maskulin)
- 2004: Gute Diese (aka DJ Ugly Cut with Verbal Kint)
- 2004: Direkt aus dem Knast (Du Spast) (with Jack Orsen)
- 2004: These Walls EP (with Abstract Rude)
- 2005: Dogma (Gegen die Zeit) (with MC Basstard)
- 2006: Keine Miese (aka DJ Ugly Cut with Verbal Kint)
- 2006: Aus Liebe (with Justus)
- 2006: Eine Orgiee / All Coast (with King Orgasmus One)
- 2007: WWW (with The Rifleman)

- 2013: Taktloss & Justus (as Real Geizt & Splidttercrist) (with Justus Jonas)
