= Change It All =

Studio album by Goapele
- Released: December 27, 2005
- Genre: R&B; soul; neo soul
- Length: 62:14
- Label: Skyblaze; Columbia
- Producer: AmpLive; Bedrock; Bicasso; Goapele; Jeff Bhasker; Linda Perry; Mike Tiger; Sa-Ra Creative Partners

Goapele chronology
| Even Closer (2002) | Change It All (2005) | Break of Dawn (2011) |

Singles from Change It All
- 1. "First Love" Released: 2005; 2. "Love Me Right" Released: 2006

Professional ratings
Review scores
| Source | Rating |
|---|---|
| AllMusic | 3.5/5 stars |
| Rolling Stone | 3/5 stars |

Change It All is the third studio album by American singer–songwriter Goapele. It was released on 27 December 2005, by Skyblaze Recordings and Columbia Records.

This album was composed of all-new material and was a forward step in her development as an artist, which was a great expansion in range from her previous effort. However, the much older song "Closer" was included as a bonus track after a gap of silence of 1:15 that occurred between the last two tracks. Guests included Clyde Carson from the Team and Dwele, while Mumia Abu-Jamal appeared in an interviewed voice-over on "Fly Away".

== Track listing ==
| No. | Title | Producer(s) | Length |
|---|---|---|---|
| 1. | "Intro" | Mike Tiger; Goapele | 2:08 |
| 2. | "Change It All" | Mike Tiger | 5:08 |
| 3. | "First Love" | Jeff Bhasker; Goapele | 4:26 |
| 4. | "Love Me Right" | Mike Tiger; AmpLive | 2:39 |
| 5. | "4AM" | Jeff Bhasker | 4:46 |
| 6. | "Different" | Bedrock; Mike Tiger; Bicasso | 5:15 |
| 7. | "Crushed Out" | Mike Tiger; Goapele | 4:19 |
| 8. | "Fly Away" | Sa-Ra Creative Partners | 3:49 |
| 9. | "Find a Way" | Bedrock | 3:25 |
| 10. | "If We Knew" | Bedrock | 4:18 |
| 11. | "You" | Mike Tiger; Goapele | 4:22 |
| 12. | "Good Love" | Sa-Ra Creative Partners | 3:25 |
| 13. | "Battle of the Heart" | Sa-Ra Creative Partners; Jeff Bhasker | 5:20 |
| 14. | "Darker Side of the Moon" | Linda Perry | 4:46 |
| 15. | "Closer" | Mike Tiger; AmpLive | 3:48 |

== Personnel ==
- Goapele – vocals
- Errol Cooney – guitar (1, 2, 3, 5, 6, 10, 13)
- Michael Aaberg – keyboards, clavinet, guitar, bass guitar (3, 4, 9, 10)
- Jeff Bhasker – vocals, guitar, strings (3, 7, 10)
- Geechi T. – trumpet (1)
- Apollo Novicio – turntables (1)
- Michael Urbano – drums (4)
- Greg Morgenstein – bass guitar (5, 13)
- Clyde Carson – vocals (6)
- Aries Bedgood – vocals (6, 10)
- Jubu – guitar (7)
- Bedrock – drum programming (7)
- Mumia Abu Jamal – vocals (8)
- Sa-Ra Creative Partners – vocals (8)
- Eric Smith – bass guitar (9)
- Dwele – vocals (11)
- Brian Collier – drums (11)
- Anthony Anderson – drum programming (11)
- Monét – vocals (14)
- Traci Nelson – vocals (14)
- Tim Carmon – organ (14)
- Linda Perry – guitar, piano, mellotron (14)
- Eric Schermerhorn – guitar (14)
- Paul Ill – bass guitar (14)
- Brian MacLeod – drums (14)

== Charts ==
| Chart | Peak position |
|---|---|
| US Billboard 200 | 139 |
| US Top R&B/Hip-Hop Albums (Billboard) | 32 |
| US Heatseekers Albums (Billboard) | 2 |
