= Closer (Goapele album) =

Studio album by Goapele
- Released: March 5, 2001
- Recorded: 2001
- Genre: Neo soul
- Length: 40:41
- Labels: Goapele Music, (071177GKM)
- Producers: AmpLive; The Duedaddy; Eric Krasno; Jeff Bhasker; Johnson; Mike Tiger; Nate Greenberg; Shaka Ramsay; Soulive

Goapele chronology
Closer (2001)	Even Closer (2002)

Closer is the debut studio album of R&B singer-songwriter Goapele Mohlabane. It was self-released in a strictly limited run, only available at select brick-and-mortar outlets and Web sites throughout the United States. After 5,000 copies sold independently, she released a longer album through Hieroglyphics Imperium that was noticed by Columbia Records, which picked up that album for worldwide distribution, added several tracks, and signed her to a contract through Skyblaze Recordings, her family-owned imprint. The catalog number is an in-joke reference to her birthday and initials of her name.

Several songs on this album were rerecorded for their inclusion on the follow-up album, and it is the only album on which the song "You" (a different composition from the song of the same name on Change it All) is available. It is now considered to be a valuable collector's item.

== Track listing ==
1. Closer (4:40)
2. Childhood Drama (3:23)
3. Too Much the Same (4:21)
4. Romantic (Uncensored Version) (5:58)
5. You (0:57)
6. Catch 22 (Original Version) (5:29)
7. Butterflykisses (3:23)
8. Things Don’t Exist (4:32)
9. Salvation (3:44)
10. It Takes More (3:56)

== Covers ==
- Canadian rapper Drake's 2007 mixtape Comeback Season featured a song titled "Closer," which used the chorus (sung by Andreena Mill) and backing instrumental from Goapele's original.
- Compton Rapper YG also made a cover of this song with singer Tanea titled I Made It on his Just Re'd Up mixtape.
