= You Disgust Me =

Studio album by Gangrene
- Released: August 7, 2015
- Genre: Hip-hop
- Length: 39:48
- Label: Mass Appeal
- Producer: The Alchemist; Oh No; Party Supplies; Tommy Mas

Gangrene chronology
| Welcome to Los Santos (2015) | You Disgust Me (2015) | Heads I Win, Tails You Lose (2024) |

You Disgust Me is the third full-length studio album by American hip-hop duo Gangrene. It was released on August 7, 2015, through Mass Appeal Records. Production was handled by members Oh No and Alchemist, as well as Party Supplies and Tommy Mas. It features guest appearances from Action Bronson, Chuck Strangers, Evidence, Fashawn, Havoc, Sean Price and Your Old Droog.

== Critical reception ==
Professional ratings
Aggregate scores
| Source | Rating |
|---|---|
| Metacritic | 70/100 |
Review scores
| Source | Rating |
| AllMusic | 3/5 stars |
| HipHopDX | 3.5/5 |
| Pitchfork | 6.9/10 |
| RapReviews | 7.5/10 |
| XXL | 4/5 (XL) |

You Disgust Me was met with generally favorable reviews from music critics. At Metacritic, which assigns a normalized rating out of 100 to reviews from mainstream publications, the album received an average score of 70, based on four reviews.

Darryl Robertson of XXL praised the album, calling it "is another another project where the beatmakers show their knack for spitting gritty 16s and attempting to outdo each other on their head-nodding production. Once again, it works". Jesse Fairfax of HipHopDX stated: "though their formula is simple, the pair takes precisely measured efforts to make sure each song remains true to their refined essence". Mosi Reeves of Pitchfork wrote: "both are more than capable of crafting memorable hip-hop music, even if they're too focused on cranking out bangers at an industrial rate to notice whether anything they've made stands out".

In his mixed review for AllMusic, David Jeffries wrote: "add a short runtime and You Disgust Me feels like an inflated EP of lost tracks and hidden heat, so marvel at their more crafted and conceptual albums, then come back here for a more free-form sampler of strange".

== Track listing ==
| No. | Title | Writer(s) | Producer(s) | Length |
|---|---|---|---|---|
| 1. | "The Filth" (Intro) | Michael Jackson; Alan Maman | Oh No | 0:54 |
| 2. | "Reversals" | Jackson; Maman | Oh No | 3:10 |
| 3. | "Sheet Music" (featuring Havoc and Sean Price) | Jackson; Maman; Kejuan Muchita; Sean Price | The Alchemist; Party Supplies | 3:52 |
| 4. | "Flamethrowers Pt. 2" | Jackson; Maman | Oh No | 3:00 |
| 5. | "The Man with the Horn" | Jackson; Maman | The Alchemist | 2:45 |
| 6. | "Better Things" | Jackson; Maman | Oh No | 3:06 |
| 7. | "Driving Gloves" (featuring Action Bronson) | Jackson; Maman; Ariyan Arslani; Tommy Cotler | Tommy Mas | 3:22 |
| 8. | "Gluttony" (featuring Your Old Droog and Fashawn) | Jackson; Maman; Maksim Lembersky; Santiago Leyva | Oh No | 3:43 |
| 9. | "The Scrapyards" | Jackson; Maman | Oh No | 2:49 |
| 10. | "Noon Chuckas" | Jackson; Maman | The Alchemist | 3:24 |
| 11. | "Just for Decoration" (featuring Chuck Strangers and Evidence) | Jackson; Maman; Chuck Jessamy; Michael Perretta | The Alchemist | 3:11 |
| 12. | "Hazardous Materials" | Jackson; Maman | Oh No | 3:28 |
| 13. | "The Hidden Land" | Jackson; Maman | The Alchemist | 3:04 |
| 14. | "Hot Pillow" (bonus track) |
| Total length: | | | | 39:48 |

== Personnel ==
- Michael "Oh No" Jackson – vocals, producer (tracks: 1, 2, 4, 6, 8, 9, 12), mixing
- Alan "The Alchemist" Maman – vocals, producer (tracks: 3, 5, 10, 11, 13), mixing
- Kejuan "Havoc" Muchita – vocals (track 3)
- Sean Price – vocals (track 3)
- Ariyan "Action Bronson" Arslani – vocals (track 7)
- Maksim "Your Old Droog" Lembersky – vocals (track 8)
- Santiago "Fashawn" Leyva – vocals (track 8)
- Chuck "Chuck Strangers" Jessamy – vocals (track 11)
- Michael "Evidence" Perretta – vocals (track 11)
- Romeo "DJ Romes" Jimenez – scratches (tracks: 8, 12), mixing
- Justin Nealis – producer (track 3)
- Sean Mahon – producer (track 3)
- Tommy "Tommy Mas" Cotler – producer (track 7)
- Joe LaPorta – mastering
- Jason Goldwatch – art direction, photography
- Mike Lukowski – artwork
