= NBA 2K9 =

2008 basketball video game

- PlayStation 3 cover art featuring Kevin Garnett
- Developer: Visual Concepts
- Publisher: 2K
- Series: NBA 2K
- Platforms: PlayStation 2 PlayStation 3 Xbox 360; Microsoft Windows
- Release: NA: October 7, 2008; PAL: October 10, 2008; JP: March 26, 2009; Windows: EU: October 17, 2008; NA: October 20, 2008
- Genre: Sports
- Modes: Single-player, multiplayer

NBA 2K9 is a 2008 basketball simulation video game developed by Visual Concepts and published by 2K. It is the tenth installment in the NBA 2K franchise and the successor to NBA 2K8. It was released in 2008 for the PlayStation 2, PlayStation 3, Xbox 360, and Microsoft Windows. Kevin Garnett of the Boston Celtics is the cover athlete of the game. NBA 2K9 is the predecessor to NBA 2K10 in the NBA 2K series. Like the past games in the series, NBA 2K9 simulates the experience of the sport of basketball, and more specifically, the National Basketball Association. Players play NBA games with any team of their choosing, and may customize many different aspects to alter the play style and overall presentation. Several single- and multiplayer game modes are present, including season, online, and quick play, as well as the ability to create new teams and players.

Like the past games in the series, NBA 2K9 simulates the experience of the sport of basketball, and more specifically, the National Basketball Association. Players play NBA games with any team of their choosing, and may customize many different aspects to alter the play style and overall presentation. Several single- and multiplayer game modes are present, including season, online, and quick play, as well as the ability to create new teams and players.

NBA 2K9 received positive reviews from critics upon release. Most positive comments were concerning the overall gameplay, and the aesthetical presentation; some called NBA 2K9 the "best basketball game around". Some criticism was directed at the game for what some saw as having a lack of new features. By July 2009, the game had sold over 2 million copies.

== Gameplay ==
NBA 2K9 is a basketball simulation video game based on the National Basketball Association. Like past games in the series, NBA 2K9 simulates the experience of the sport of basketball, and more specifically, the NBA. Players play NBA games with any real life or custom team, and can customize many aspects, such as camera angles, the presentation of players, the sound levels, and the level of realism. Several different game modes are present, such as Association 2.0 (a season mode), 5-on-5 online multiplayer, mini games, and quick games of varying levels of competition. Like other NBA 2K games, NBA 2K9 is marketed as being as realistic as the actual NBA, with all the things featured in NBA games, such as commentary, halftime shows, replays, crowds, and real player movement, among many other things. Another feature heavily touted before release was the game's HD visuals, which was said to have been "drastically improved". Kevin Harlan and Clark Kellogg are the commentators with Cheryl Miller being a sideline reporter.

== Development ==
Kevin Garnett is the cover athlete of the game. NBA 2K9's soundtrack consists of 24 licensed songs as well as one original song.

The game was released worldwide in 2008 for PlayStation 2, PlayStation 3, Xbox 360, and Windows. NBA 2K9 is the first game in the NBA 2K series to be released on PC.

== Soundtrack ==
- Beastie Boys - Root Down
- DJ Rasta Root - RootZilla Beez
- Mommy and Daddy - Pretty Loser
- Money Mark - Silly Putty
- N.E.R.D. - Spaz
- Nickodemus - Funky in the Middle
- Santigold - Creator ft. Switch, Freq Nasty
- Skeewiff - Light the Fuse
- Spank Rock, Benny Blanco - Loose (Instrumental)
- The Brand New Heavies - Jump N' Move
- The Cool Kids - 2K Pennies
- The Heavy - Coleen
- The Limp Twins - Moving Closer to the Sofa
- The Meters - Cissy Strut
- The Pharcyde - Passin' Me By
- Ursula 1000 - Step Back (Deekline & Ed Solo Remix)

== Reception ==
Reception

Aggregate score
Aggregator	Score			
Aggregator	PC	PS2	PS3	Xbox 360
Metacritic	80/100	73/100	82/100	84/100

Review scores
Publication	Score			
Publication	PC	PS2	PS3	Xbox 360
Famitsu	N/A	24/40	27/40	27/40
Game Informer	N/A	N/A	8.5/10	8.5/10
GameSpot	N/A	N/A	8/10	8/10
GameSpy	N/A	N/A	4.5/5	4.5/5
GameTrailers	N/A	N/A	8.4/10	N/A
GameZone	N/A	N/A	N/A	8.4/10
IGN	8/10	7/10	8.5/10	8.5/10
Official Xbox Magazine (US)	N/A	N/A	N/A	8.5/10
PC Gamer (UK)	83%	N/A	N/A	N/A
PlayStation: The Official Magazine	N/A	N/A	4/5	N/A
411Mania	N/A	N/A	8.6/10	N/A

NBA 2K9 received "favorable" reviews on all platforms except the PlayStation 2 version, which received "average" reviews, according to the review aggregation website Metacritic. In Japan, Famitsu gave it a score of three sevens and one six for the PlayStation 3 and Xbox 360 versions; and two sixes, one seven, and one five for the PlayStation 2 version.

David Ellis of 1UP.com particularly praised the customization aspects of the PS3 and Xbox 360 versions and the levels of realism, but disliked the unnecessarily complicated control scheme. Ellis also spoke positively of the online modes and the Living Rosters feature. Ellis summed up his review by stating: "The NBA 2K9 team has refined last year's game and added several new features that change the way videogame basketball is played. While it's not perfect, 2K9's certainly headed toward another title run." Matt Bertz of Game Informer said that the concepts of the same console versions "continue to refine [the series] with the deepest franchise mode in any sports game", called the crowd animations "amazing", liked the broadcast team, complimented most aspects of the controls, and said the game is "the best basketball game around for hoops aficionados". Bertz stated: "With its realistic animations, solid controls, and ambitious Association mode, NBA 2K9 makes its title run once again. But the competition is stiffening, and next year needs to bring significant leaps forward with online play and the low-post game if 2K wants to make it 10 in a row."

Aaron Thomas of GameSpot praised the "Living Rosters", "excellent" gameplay, and the presentation of the PS3 and Xbox 360 versions. Thomas said: "It's disappointing that there aren't more noteworthy additions to this year's game. Living rosters and five-on-five play are nice, but their appeal is limited. That said, there's very little not to like about NBA 2K9. Player animations are outstanding, Association mode is deep, online options are plentiful, and the gameplay is terrific. If you're a baller, this is the game for you." IGN's Nate Ahearn said of the PC, PS3, and Xbox 360 versions: "NBA 2K9 is [a] basketball game for the purists out there and has plenty for diehard basketball fans to enjoy. At a price of $19.99 I can almost forgive the absence of multiplayer, especially when you consider how much game there is still is to play. There are tidbits built in to appease casual fans, but theres no question that with things like Bird Years making their way into this years game that 2K9 is made for aficionados. Even still, anyone who has seen a pro game will be able to find the similarities and the finite details that make NBA 2K9 the best game in town."

GameTrailers complimented the PS3 version's overall presentation, crowd animations, overall gameplay, and CPU, but disliked the game's lack of an identity, the menu designs, commentary, online technical issues, and the introduction of some "silly" features. The review stated: "The NBA 2K series has seen modest improvements since NBA 2K7, primarily due to the level of quality achieved at such an early phase in the next-gen life cycle. Because of this, casual hoops players aren't going to be wowed with this latest iteration of NBA 2K9, but it's meant to satisfy those who live and breathe basketball, as the improvements in the AI and atmosphere alone are sure to tickle the inner twine of dedicated fans."

During the 12th Annual Interactive Achievement Awards, the Academy of Interactive Arts & Sciences nominated NBA 2K9 for "Sports Game of the Year".

=== Sales ===
By July 2009, NBA 2K9 had sold over 2 million copies across all platforms.
