= All Balls Don't Bounce =

Studio album by Aceyalone
- Released: October 24, 1995
- Studios: Kitchen Sync; Hollywood Sound Recorders, Hollywood, CA
- Genre: Alternative hip hop
- Length: 61:46
- Label: Capitol
- Producers: The Nonce, Punish, Vic Hop, Chillin Villin Empire, Mumbles, Aceyalone, Fat Jack

Aceyalone chronology
All Balls Don't Bounce (1995)	A Book of Human Language (1998)

Singles from All Balls Don't Bounce
- 1. "Mic Check" Released: 1995; 2. "The Greatest Show on Earth" Released: 1996

All Balls Don't Bounce is the debut studio album by American rapper Aceyalone. It was released in 1995 on Capitol Records. In 2004, it was re-released on Project Blowed and Decon as All Balls Don't Bounce: Revisited with a bonus disc.

== Critical reception ==
Professional ratings
Review scores
Source	Rating
AllMusic	5/5 stars
The Austin Chronicle	5/5 stars
Daily Vault	A−
RapReviews	10/10
The Rolling Stone Album Guide	4/5 stars
Spin	9/10

Writing for The Austin Chronicle, Rashied Gabriel thought that the album's production and Aceylone's "various styles" worked to complementary effect. He went on to label All Balls Don't Bounce "a sureshot record", and felt that it delivered "verbal calisthenics that astound with fresh insight as well as lyrical wizardry." Robert Christgau gave it a "neither" rating, indicating that an album "may impress once or twice with consistent craft or an arresting track or two. Then it won't." The Village Voice noted that "the beats ... have that West Coast vibes-and-upright-bass feel, peppered with whistles and old-school drum machines, but they're stripped down to new specs: raw but not East Coast grimee, slinky but not Snoopish."

In a retrospective review, Steve Huey of AllMusic described Aceyalone as "one of the greatest lyricists the West Coast has ever produced, twisting his fluid rhymes around and off the beat with the improvisational assurance of Rakim." He also commented that "[the production] is solid if unspectacular, usually spare and jazzy, with lots of piano/keyboard samples and some fitting nods to the abstract side of hard bop."

It was named by OC Weekly as one of the "Five Classic West Coast Rap Albums Turning 20 in 2015".

== Track listing ==
No.	Title	Producer(s)	Length
1.	"All Balls"	The Nonce	4:31
2.	"Anywhere You Go"	Punish	4:10
3.	"Deep and Wide" (featuring Abstract Rude)	Vic Hop	2:32
4.	"Mr. Outsider"	The Nonce	5:53
5.	"Annalillia?"	The Nonce	4:13
6.	"Knownots" (featuring Abstract Rude and Mikah 9)	Vic Hop	5:00
7.	"Arhythamaticulas"	Chillin Villain Empire	3:28
8.	"The Greatest Show on Earth"	Mumbles	4:47
9.	"Mic Check"	Vic Hop	4:23
10.	"Call It Cali"	Punish	0:54
11.	"Headaches and Woes"	Punish	3:57
12.	"I Think"	Aceyalone	1:18
13.	"Makeba"	Mumbles	5:20
14.	"B-Boy Kingdom" (featuring Abstract Rude, Mikah 9, and P.E.A.C.E.)	Fat Jack	5:37
15.	"Keep It True" (featuring Abstract Rude and Change of Rhythm)	Fat Jack	5:33

All Balls Don't Bounce: Revisited bonus disc
No.	Title	Producer(s)	Length
1.	"All Balls Intro"	The Nonce	3:13
2.	"Universal Soldier"	Riddlore, NGA Fish, C.V.E.	1:02
3.	"Headaches and Woes Intro"	Aceyalone	0:38
4.	"Headaches and Woes (Remix)"	Fat Jack	5:56
5.	"The Greatest Show on Earth (Remix)"	Fat Jack	4:35
6.	"The Greatest Show on Earth (Remix)"	Bar 9	4:02
7.	"Mic Check (Remix)"	Kemo	4:46
8.	"Show Your Right"	Fat Jack	3:59
9.	"The Nobodys"	Fat Jack	3:42
10.	"They Don't Know"	Underground Railroad	4:15
11.	"Feet Up on the Table" (featuring Riddlore, Vic Hop, Ellay Khule, NGA Fish, Mark the Murderah, and Abstract Rude)	DJ Homicide	4:41
12.	"Tweakendz"	Vic Hop, Aceyalone	4:27
13.	"I Dream"	O-Roc, Aceyalone	5:37
14.	"Believe in Your Self"	Fat Jack	4:02
