= Magnificent City =

Studio album by Aceyalone with RJD2
- Released: February 7, 2006
- Genre: Hip-hop
- Length: 51:48
- Label: Decon; Project Blowed
- Producer: RJD2

Aceyalone chronology
Love & Hate (2003)	Magnificent City (2006)	Grand Imperial (2006)

RJD2 chronology
Since We Last Spoke (2004)	Magnificent City (2006)	The Third Hand (2007)

Singles from Magnificent City
- 1. "Fire" Released: 2005; 2. "Supahero" Released: 2006

Magnificent City is a full American studio album by American rapper Aceyalone, accompanied by American hip-hop producer RJD2. It was released on Decon and Project Blowed in 2006. It peaked at number 39 on the Billboard Heatseekers Albums chart, as well as number 43 on the Independent Albums chart.

RJD2 released a compilation of instrumental versions of songs from the album in 2006, entitled Magnificent City Instrumentals. The track "A Beautiful Mine" was adapted as the opening theme of the AMC television series Mad Men.

== Critical reception ==
Professional ratings
Aggregate scores
Source	Rating
Metacritic	81/100
Review scores
Source	Rating
AllMusic	4.5/5 stars
Alternative Press	4/5 stars
The A.V. Club	A−
Entertainment Weekly	B
HipHopDX	3.0/5
Okayplayer	4/5 stars
Paste	4/5 stars
Pitchfork	3.2/10
RapReviews	8.5/10
Slant Magazine	4.5/5 stars
Stylus	B−

At Metacritic, which assigns a weighted average score out of 100 to reviews from mainstream critics, the album received an average score of 81, based on 10 reviews, indicating "universal acclaim".

John Bush of AllMusic said: "Ten years after West Coast rap began to slow down, Rjd2 shows he can interpret it for the 21st century, with huge hooks that draw listeners in, but clever productions that allow for all of Aceyalone's talents to shine through." Nathan Rabin of The A.V. Club said: "Aceyalone hasn't felt this vital in ages, and RJD2's creative winning streak continues unabated."

Jonathan Keefe of Slant Magazine named it the 9th best album of 2006.

== Track listing ==
No.	Title	Length
1.	"All for U"	3:28
2.	"Fire"	4:11
3.	"Cornbread, Eddie & Me"	2:46
4.	"Mooore"	4:49
5.	"Supahero"	4:11
6.	"High Lights"	3:22
7.	"Disconnected"	3:21
8.	"Caged Bird"	3:12
9.	"Solomon Jones"	3:46
10.	"A Sunday Mystery"	1:33
11.	"Junior"	3:41
12.	"Heaven"	3:38
13.	"Here & Now"	4:21
14.	"A Beautiful Mine"	5:29

== Charts ==
Chart	Peak position
US Heatseekers Albums (Billboard)	39
US Independent Albums (Billboard)	43
