= Grand Imperial (album) =

Mixtape by Aceyalone
- Released: April 4, 2006
- Genre: Hip-hop
- Length: 37:42
- Label: Project Blowed, Decon
- Producer: Kenny Segal, Z-Trip, Beat Science, Aziph, Chris Craft, RJD2, the Functionist, Morgan Z

Aceyalone chronology
Magnificent City (2006)	Grand Imperial (2006)	Lightning Strikes (2007)

Grand Imperial is a mixtape by American rapper Aceyalone, released on Project Blowed and Decon in 2006.

== Critical reception ==
Professional ratings
Review scores
Source	Rating
AllMusic	3.5/5 stars
RapReviews	8/10

Marisa Brown of AllMusic praised the RJD2-produced tracks ("Never Come Back", "Angelina Valintina", and "Impact"). She said, "[RJD2 is] really quite talented in his ability to make a diverse set of beats while still sounding like himself, and all three tracks included here continue to prove that." Steve Juon of RapReviews said, "Two of the most entertaining tracks may be the live recording of Aceyalone performing 'Makebalillia', which has an unexpected Michael Jackson twist, and the heavy pounding UK Remix of 'Doin' My Job' produced by The Functionist."

== Track listing ==
No.	Title	Producer(s)	Length
1.	"Grand Imperial"	Kenny Segal	3:43
2.	"Everything Changes" (featuring Mystic)	Z-Trip	5:19
3.	"Push" (featuring Zulu)	Beat Science	2:13
4.	"Sunsets & Waterfalls" (featuring Otherwize and Pterradacto)	Aziph	2:34
5.	"Pose"	Chris Craft	3:37
6.	"Never Come Back"	RJD2	2:39
7.	"Angelina Valintina"	RJD2	3:01
8.	"Makebalillia Live"		6:46
9.	"Doin' My Job (UK Remix)"	The Functionist	3:31
10.	"Too to the Max"	Morgan Z	2:19
11.	"Impact"	RJD2	2:00
