= Love & Hate (Aceyalone album) =

Studio album by Aceyalone
- Released: June 3, 2003
- Genre: Hip-hop
- Length: 59:38
- Labels: Project Blowed; Decon
- Producers: DJ Drez; El-P; Fat Jack; High Priest; Kiilu Grand; M. Sayyid; PMG; Riddlore?; RJD2; Joey Chavez

Aceyalone chronology
Hip Hop and the World We Live In (2002)	Love & Hate (2003)	Magnificent City (2006)

Singles from Love & Hate
- 1. "Moonlight Skies" Released: 2003; 2. "Lost Your Mind" Released: 2003

Love & Hate is the fifth solo studio album by American rapper Aceyalone. It was released on June 3, 2003 via Project Blowed/Decon. Production was handled by PMG, RJD2, Riddlore?, DJ Drez, El-P, Fat Jack, High Priest, Kiilu Grand, M. Sayyid and Joey Chavez. It features guest appearances from Riddlore?, Abstract Rude, Big Arch, Casual, El-P, Goapele, High Priest, M. Sayyid, Self Jupiter, and The Soul Of John Black. In the United States, the album peaked at number 50 on the Heatseekers Albums and number 31 on the Independent Albums charts.

== Critical reception ==
Professional ratings
Aggregate scores
Source	Rating
Metacritic	66/100
Review scores
Source	Rating
AllHipHop	3.5/5 stars
AllMusic	4.5/5 stars
Daily Vault	B
Entertainment Weekly	C
HipHopDX	3.5/5
Pitchfork	6.7/10
RapReviews	10/10
The New Rolling Stone Album Guide	2.5/5 stars
The Village Voice	(2-star Honorable Mention)
Tom Hull	A-

Love & Hate was met with generally favourable reviews from music critics. At Metacritic, which assigns a normalized rating out of 100 to reviews from mainstream publications, the album received an average score of 66, based on nine reviews.

AllMusic's John Bush praised the album, calling it "a simple, straight-ahead match of excellent MC with great producers". Andy Beta of Pitchfork stated: "as he tries to return to the ponderous themes of such vague nonsense as love and hate, Acey weighs the pacing of the game considerably".

In mixed reviews, Evan Serpick of Entertainment Weekly wrote: "the beats--never a selling point for Acey's albums--don't have the verve to lift leaden lines". Michaelangelo Matos of The New Rolling Stone Album Guide concluded: "Love and Hate finds Acey sounding unsure where to go next". Robert Christgau of The Village Voice singled out two songs, "Takeoff" and "Ms. Amerikkka", describing the album as "binary in the great polarized underground tradition — e.g., lively and tedious".

== Track listing ==
No.	Title	Producer(s)	Length
1.	"Love and Hate Theme"	DJ Drez	1:33
2.	"Junkman"	PMG	3:53
3.	"Let Me Hear Sumn" (featuring Casual and Big Arch)	PMG	4:14
4.	"Lost Your Mind"	RJD2	4:02
5.	"In Stereo"	PMG	3:19
6.	"Takeoff"	RJD2	3:58
7.	"Love and Hate"	PMG	3:35
8.	"The Saga Continues" (featuring Abstract Rude)	Fat Jack	5:05
9.	"Moonlight Skies" (featuring Goapele)	RJD2	4:17
10.	"Ace Cowboy" (featuring The Soul of John Black)	Kiilu Grand	5:30
11.	"So Much Pain" (featuring Riddlore? and Self Jupiter)	Riddlore?	4:30
12.	"Find Out" (featuring Riddlore?)	Riddlore?	3:40
13.	"City of Shit" (featuring El-P)	El-P	3:46
14.	"Lights Out" (featuring Sayyid and Priest)	Airborn Audio	3:52
15.	"Ms. Amerikkka" (Bonus)	Joey Chavez	4:24
Total length:			59:38

== Charts ==
Chart (2003)	Peak position
US Independent Albums (Billboard)	31
US Heatseekers Albums (Billboard)	50
