= Lightning Strikes (Aceyalone album) =

Studio album by Aceyalone
- Released: October 2, 2007
- Genre: Hip-hop
- Length: 46:23
- Label: Decon
- Producer: Bionik

Aceyalone chronology
Grand Imperial (2006)	Lightning Strikes (2007)	Aceyalone & the Lonely Ones (2009)

Lightning Strikes is the eighth studio album by American rapper Aceyalone. It was released on Decon in 2007. The production is handled by Bionik.

== Critical reception ==
Professional ratings
Review scores
Source	Rating
AllMusic	3.5/5 stars
Impose	favorable
Okayplayer	favorable
Pitchfork	5.5/10
RapReviews	7.5/10
XLR8R	7/10

Nate Patrin of Pitchfork said, "The problem is that, even with Aceyalone's lyrical style toned down a little, the attempted merging of underground rap and pop-reggae makes Lightning Strikes sort of a mess, even if it's the kind of mess where half the tracks are fairly likable." Scott Thill of XLR8R said, "Yes, anything from Acey is worth your cash, but I can't wait until he goes retro with analog drums on reel-to-reel."

== Track listing ==
No.	Title	Length
1.	"Lightning Strikes"	2:29
2.	"Suicide" (featuring Bionik)	2:50
3.	"Sound Gun"	2:38
4.	"Easy" (featuring Chali 2na and Bionik)	2:52
5.	"Genie"	2:53
6.	"Pick-A-Part" (featuring Jah Orah)	3:08
7.	"Shango"	3:06
8.	"To the Top"	3:26
9.	"When I Woke Up" (featuring Zulu)	3:04
10.	"Pose (Remix)" (featuring Bionik)	3:43
11.	"Supercool"	1:47
12.	"Master" (featuring Jah Orah and Bionik)	3:25
13.	"Help Us All"	3:54
14.	"Jungle Muzik" (featuring Jah Orah)	4:24
15.	"Top Choice" (featuring Bionik)	2:44
