= Break of Dawn (Goapele album) =

Studio album by Goapele
- Released: October 25, 2011
- Recorded: 2007–2011
- Genre: R&B; neo soul
- Label: Skyblaze; Decon
- Producer: Bedrock; Bobby Ozuna; Drumma Boy; Electric Thunderbolt; Kerry "Krucial" Brothers; Malay

Goapele chronology
| Change It All (2005) | Break of Dawn (2011) | Strong as Glass (2014) |

Singles from Break of Dawn
- 1. "Milk & Honey" Released: August 4, 2009; 2. "Play" Released: August 29, 2011; 3. "Tears On My Pillow" Released: March 27, 2012; 4. "Undertow" Released: July 24, 2012

Break of Dawn (formerly titled Milk & Honey) is the fourth studio album from American singer-songwriter Goapele, after a five-year-long hiatus. It was released on 25 October 2011, by Skyblaze Recordings and Decon Records, with production from Kerry "Krucial" Brothers, Drumma Boy, and Malay, among others.

== Background ==
The first single, "Milk & Honey," was leaked on the Internet July 10, 2009, while the video directed by David Telles went into rotation on August 4, 2009, and was shot with the Red One Camera. It offers a more suggestive and seductive vibe than what fans may be accustomed to from the singer. Goapele is known to incorporate messages of politics, love, romance, and struggle into her music. The second single, "Right Here," is a love song produced by Drumma Boy.

On August 28, 2011, Goapele released the third single, "Play," a sensual song produced by Dan Electric & Teddy Thunderbolt.

== Recording ==
Break of Dawn was recorded at the Zoo in Downtown Oakland, California, home of Goapele’s Skylight Studios. This project will be another personal album with several love songs as well as up-tempo joints. Production-wise, tracks with Kanye West, Drumma Boy, Dan Electric, Mike Tiger, Bobby Ozuna, Malay, Kerry "Krucial" Brothers, and other musicians were confirmed.

== Concept ==
On this album Goapele revealed a more confident, open, and sensual side. She said that she was liberating herself a little more and claims while there was something very empowering about appearing in a T-shirt without make-up on the cover of her first internationally distributed album, Even Closer, there is something equally empowering about shedding her fears of music-industry exploitation and strutting confidently into more brazen territory. She said, “Now if I want to dress sexy, I can, and if I want to be more blunt, I can. I just want to do what feels good.”

== Track listing ==
1. "Play"—3:43
2. "Tears On My Pillow"—4:46
3. "Undertow"—3:47
4. "Break of Dawn"—4:29
5. "Hush"—4:05
6. "Money"—4:06
7. "Pieces"—3:24
8. "Right Here"—3:21
9. "Milk & Honey"—3:12
10. "Cupcake" —3:40
