= A Book of Human Language =

Studio album by Aceyalone
- Released: April 14, 1998
- Genres: Alternative hip hop, experimental hip hop
- Length: 68:46
- Label: Project Blowed
- Producer: Mumbles

Aceyalone chronology
All Balls Don't Bounce (1995)	A Book of Human Language (1998)	Accepted Eclectic (2001)

A Book of Human Language is the second studio album by the American rapper Aceyalone. It was released on Project Blowed in 1998. The album was produced by Mumbles.

== Critical reception ==
Professional ratings
Review scores
Source	Rating
AllMusic	4/5 stars
RapReviews	10/10
The Source	2.5/5 stars

Bill Cassel of AllMusic wrote: "Aceyalone wins major points for even trying to tackle weighty topics like life, death, time, and language." Brian Coleman of CMJ New Music Monthly called it "one of the most intelligent albums" of the year. Malik Singleton of Vibe described it as "an uninhibited exhibition of lyric artistry laid over jazzy breakbeats and rare groove loops."

In 2014, Paste ranked the album at number five on their list of "12 Classic Hip-Hop Albums That Deserve More Attention". In 2018, they ranked it number 28 on their list of "The 30 Best Albums of 1998".

In 2015, Fact placed it at number 24 on its list of the "100 Best Indie Hip-Hop Records of All Time".

In 2019, John Morrison of Bandcamp Daily said "Mumbles's textured bop and free-jazz sampled beats and Acey's dextrous stream-of-consciousness meld to create a fascinating form of hip-hop jazz aligned with the heavy atmosphere and twisting riffing of Speak No Evil-era Wayne Shorter."

== Track listing ==
No.	Title	Length
1.	"Forward"	2:25
2.	"The Guidelines"	4:47
3.	"Contents"	0:54
4.	"The Balance"	5:07
5.	"The Energy"	1:39
6.	"The Hurt"	4:33
7.	"The Hold"	3:40
8.	"The Walls & Windows"	5:42
9.	"The Jabberwocky"	1:52
10.	"The Grandfather Clock"	4:57
11.	"The Reason"	1:21
12.	"The March"	2:04
13.	"The Vision"	1:26
14.	"The Faces"	4:16
15.	"The Hunt Prelude"	1:19
16.	"The Hunt"	4:42
17.	"The Catch"	1:25
18.	"The Thief in the Night"	6:45
19.	"Human Language"	7:47
20.	"Afterward"	2:06
