= Hip Hop and the World We Live In =

Studio album by Aceyalone
- Released: April 20, 2002
- Genre: Hip hop
- Length: 55:39
- Label: Project Blowed, Decon
- Producer: Elusive

Aceyalone chronology
| Accepted Eclectic (2001) | Hip Hop and the World We Live In (2002) | Love & Hate (2003) |

Hip Hop and the World We Live In is the fourth studio album by American rapper Aceyalone. Entirely produced by Elusive, it was released on Project Blowed and Decon on April 20th 2002. "Rapps on Deck" was released as the only single.

== Critical reception ==
Professional ratings
Review scores
| Source | Rating |
|---|---|
| Pitchfork | 7.5/10 |
| RapReviews | 8/10 |

Julianne Escobedo Shepherd of Pitchfork described the album as "a good, solid example of the art of rhyme." Steve Juon of RapReviews called it "another album that will keep Aceyalone's loyal hip-hop audience pleased." He said that "the album's only clear flaw is that the soundtrack is too static for a mic controller that's so dynamic."

== Track listing ==
| No. | Title | Length |
|---|---|---|
| 1. | "Introduction" | 2:38 |
| 2. | "I Think I Know Too Much" | 4:10 |
| 3. | "Future Rockers" | 4:20 |
| 4. | "Rapps on Deck" | 3:02 |
| 5. | "Art Club" | 3:06 |
| 6. | "Dirty Birdie" | 5:12 |
| 7. | "Shooby Dooby" | 4:14 |
| 8. | "Blink Blink" | 3:26 |
| 9. | "Scribble on a Clean Surface" | 3:51 |
| 10. | "Organic Electricity" | 5:21 |
| 11. | "Bigger They Come" | 4:51 |
| 12. | "Not When You Get Down" | 4:18 |
| 13. | "Say" | 3:43 |
| 14. | "Jack of All Trades" | 3:28 |
