= Accepted Eclectic =

Studio album by Aceyalone
- Released: March 6, 2001
- Genre: Hip hop
- Length: 63:11
- Labels: Ground Control, Project Blowed
- Producers: Evidence, Fat Jack, Joey Chavez, Julian Ware, Nick Seil, Jissm High Definition, Singlie

Aceyalone chronology
A Book of Human Language (1998)	Accepted Eclectic (2001)	Hip Hop and the World We Live In (2002)

Accepted Eclectic is the third studio album by American rapper Aceyalone. It was released on Ground Control and Project Blowed in 2001. It peaked at number 36 on the Billboard Independent Albums chart.

== Critical reception ==
Professional ratings
Review scores
Source	Rating
AllMusic	4.5/5 stars
The A.V. Club	favorable
NME	7/10
Pitchfork	7.3/10
Robert Christgau	B+

Steve Huey of AllMusic commented that "the shifting classical samples of the title track make it one of the best productions in his catalog." David M. Pecoraro of Pitchfork said, "Sure, it's often funny, and occasionally exciting, but ultimately, the attention to detail inherent in previous works has been marked absent." Shan Fowler of PopMatters named it one of the best albums of 2001.

== Track listing ==
No.	Title	Producer(s)	Length
1.	"Rappers Rappers Rappers"	Evidence	4:13
2.	"Five Feet"	Fat Jack	4:09
3.	"Alive"	Joey Chavez	4:04
4.	"Hardship"	Evidence	2:55
5.	"I Never Knew"	Joey Chavez, Julian Ware	4:04
6.	"I Got to Have It Too"	Fat Jack	3:34
7.	"Accepted Eclectic"	Nick Seil	4:38
8.	"Golden Mic"	Fat Jack	4:23
9.	"B-Boy Real McCoy" (featuring Abstract Rude)	Jissm High Definition	3:19
10.	"Down Right Dirty"	Evidence	4:25
11.	"Master Your High"	Joey Chavez, Julian Ware	3:37
12.	"Microphones" (featuring P.E.A.C.E.)	Evidence	4:16
13.	"Serve & Protect"	Nick Seil	3:49
14.	"Bounce"	Nick Seil	3:40
15.	"I Can't Complain"	Singlie	3:59
16.	"Project Blowed"	Fat Jack	4:15

== Charts ==
Chart	Peak position
US Independent Albums (Billboard)	36
