= Abstract Rude =

American rapper

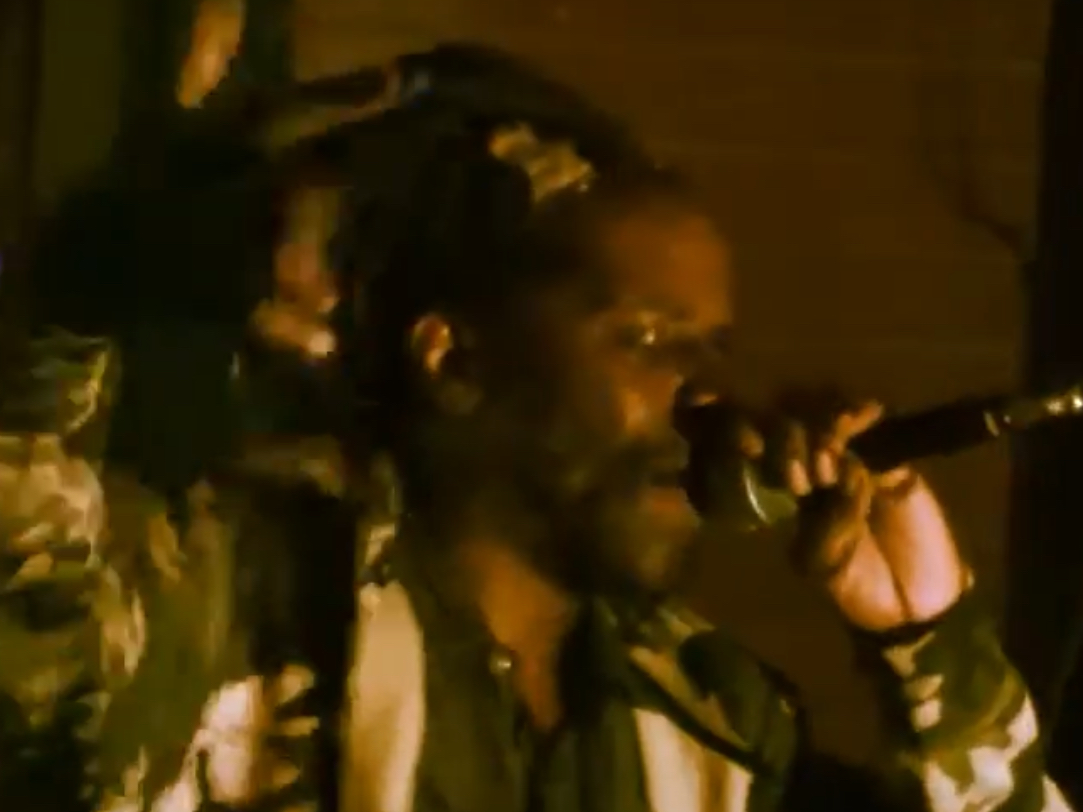
- Abstract Rude performing in 2018

Background information
- Also known as: Ab Rude, Abbey Rude, The Scorpion, A.B. Baracus
- Born: Aaron Pointer; November 17, 1975 (age 51)
- Origin: Los Angeles, California, US
- Genre: Underground hip-hop
- Occupations: Rapper; songwriter
- Works: Project Blowed (founder)
- Years active: 1992–present
- Labels: Battle Axe Records; Rhymesayers Entertainment
- Formerly of: Abstract Tribe Unique; The A-Team; Code Name: Scorpion; Haiku d'Etat

Aaron Pointer (born November 17, 1975), better known by his stage name Abstract Rude, is an American rapper from Los Angeles, California.

== Career ==
Pointer's career began at Los Angeles' historical Good Life Cafe, a renowned open mic venue. He rapped every Thursday night at Good Life and was a co-founder of the Project Blowed crew that emerged from the Good Life scene. He was the rapper of Abstract Tribe Unique, alongside dancers Zulu Butterfly and Irie Lion King, turntablist DJ Drez and producer Fat Jack. He was also a member of Haiku d'Etat with Myka 9 and Aceyalone, The A-Team with Aceyalone, and Code Name: Scorpion with Moka Only and Prevail. In 2009, he released the album Rejuvenation on Rhymesayers Entertainment. It was entirely produced by Vitamin D.

== Discography ==
=== Solo ===
- Making Tracks (2002)
- Making More Tracks (2004)
- Still Making Tracks: The Import (2004)
- A Coat of Gold P.A.I.N.T. (2008)
- Steel Making Trax: The Export (2010)
- Keep the Feel: A Legacy of Hip Hop Soul (2015)
- Making Lost Trax Reappear (2018)
- Making Lava Tracks (2019)
- Making Indie Traxx: Dusty Pointer Fingers (2023)
- Making Indie Traxx: Dirty Pea Pods (2023)

=== Collaborations ===
Abstract Tribe Unique (Abstract Rude, DJ Drez & Fat Jack)

- Underground Fossils (1996)
- Mood Pieces (1997)
- South Central Thynk Taynk (1998)
  - Remastered (2026)
- P.A.I.N.T. (2001)
- Showtyme! (2003)

Haiku d'Etat (Abstract Rude, Aceyalone & Myka 9)

- Haiku d'Etat (1999)
- Coup de Theatre (2004)
- Haiku de Theatre: The Best of Haiku (2017)

The A-Team (Abstract Rude & Aceyalone)

- Who Framed The A-Team? (1999)
- Lab Down Under (2003)
- Who Reframed the A-Team (2006)

Other collaborations

- Live @ the 700 Club (1999) (with live band, as Chef Salad & the Crew Tones)
- Code Name: Scorpion (2001) (with Moka Only & Prevail, as Code Name: Scorpion)
- Rejuvenation (2009) (with Vitamin D)
- Dear Abbey: The Lost Letters Mixtape (2012) (with Vitamin D)
- AyeM Ray-DIO (2015) (with Myka 9, as AyeM Ray-DIO)
- The Owl's Cry (2017) (with DJ Vadim)

=== EPs ===
- These Walls EP (2005) (with Taktloss)
- Eyes Wide Shuttish: Short Rhymes Vol. 1 (2008)
- The Awful Truth (2012) (with Musab)
- LA Basin (2022)

=== Guest appearances ===
- Aceyalone - "Deep and Wide", "Knownots", "B-Boy Kingdom" and "Keep It True" from All Balls Don't Bounce (1995)
- Moka Only - "Renagade Gangsta" from Dusty Bumps (1996)
- Busdriver - "Get on the Bus" from Memoirs of the Elephant Man (1999)
- The Grouch - "Blood, Dick & Pussy" from Making Perfect Sense (1999)
- Nobody - "Inner Eye" from Soulmates (2000)
- Fat Jack - "Cater to the DJ", “We Like Breakbeats”, "Rudeboy Represents" and “Oh Sha Sha” from Cater to the DJ (2000)
- Freestyle Fellowship - "Fragrance" from Temptations (2001)
- Aceyalone - "B-Boy Real McCoy" from Accepted Eclectic (2001)
- Awol One & Daddy Kev - "Confusion" from Souldoubt (2001)
- Moka Only - "Rolling Along" from Lime Green (2001)
- DJ Murge - "Search and Rescue" from Search and Rescue (2002)
- Mr. Brady - "Who" from Dirty (2003)
- Eligh - "A Poet Sits" from Poltergeist (2003)
- Daedelus - "Girls" from The Quiet Party (2003)
- Pigeon John - "Life Goes On" from Is Dating Your Sister (2003)
- Aceyalone - "The Saga Continues" from Love & Hate (2003)
- Omid - "Myth Behind the Man" from Monolith (2003)
- The Grouch & Eligh - "This Is Yo Life" from No More Greener Grasses (2003)
- Busdriver - "Unnecessary Thinking" from Cosmic Cleavage (2004)
- P.E.A.C.E. - "Connected Functions" from Megabite (2004)
- Fat Jack - "I'm Just Livin'" and "So Many Ways" from Cater to the DJ 2 (2004)
- Sleep - "Can't Be Touched" from Christopher (2005)
- Mums the Word - "Constant Evolution" from Constant Evolution (2005)
- Busdriver - "Map Your Psyche" from Fear of a Black Tangent (2005)
- Ellay Khule - "The Turning Point" from Califormula (2005)
- Sunspot Jonz - "Another Way Out" from No Guts No Glory (2005)
- Grayskul - "After Hours" from Deadlivers (2005)
- Deep Rooted - "Pay Dues" from The Second Coming (2006)
- Acid Reign - "Heart of the City" from Time & Change (2006)
- Edit - "Night Shift" from Certified Air Raid Material (2007)
- X-Clan - "To the East" from Return from Mecca (2007)
- Nomak - "Hi Mom! ~A Prayer For World Peace~" from Calm (2007)
- The Grouch - "God Bless the Elephant" from Show You the World (2008)
- Thirsty Fish - "Fish Ain't Biting" from Testing the Waters (2008)
- Awol One & Factor Chandelier - "One Live Tape" from The Landmark (2011)
- Awol One and Nathaniel Motte - "Drink Have Take" from The Child Star (2011)
- Self Jupiter & Kenny Segal - "Outer Rings" from The Kleenrz (2012)
- Myka 9 - "Gramophone", "Enter the Slayer" from Gramophone (2012)
- Myka 9 & Factor - "Ode to Cosmosis" from Sovereign Soul (2012)
- Illogic & Blockhead - "Smile" from Capture the Sun (2013)
- Just Say PLZ - "Still Wuz Myne" from "Still Wuz Myne" (2015)
- The Funk Junkie - "You & Me" from Moondirt (2017)
- Blu & Oh No - "Round Bout Midnight" from A Long Red Hot Los Angeles Summer Night (2019)
- Blu & Fat Jack - “Low End Theory” from Underground Makes The World Go Round (2019)
- Myka 9 & Adriatic - "In My Reality" from In Motion (2019)
- Myka 9 & Adriatic - "In My Reality (Remix)" from Constellations (2020)
- Sal Crosby - "Skinny Wonder Pools" from Golden Goat (2021)
- Potatohead People - "Come Home" from Eat Your Heart Out (2024)

=== Compilation appearances ===
- "Torn" "Strength of A.T.U." on Mixed Drink (1994)
- "Torn" "Strength of A.T.U." "Ab Dawlin" on Mixed Drink 2 (1995)
- "Strength of A.T.U." "I Don't Know" "Yeh Man" "Maskaraid" "Treble and Bass" on Project Blowed (1995)
- "GB in Your Life" "Superstars" on The Good Brothers (2003)
- "Who The F*ck Is You?" "Sound Boy Murderers" "13th Month" on Project Blowed 10th Anniversary (2005

=== Music videos ===
- 2001: "Stop Biting"
- 2001: "Yep"
- 2003: "All Day"
- 2009: "Nuff Fire"
- 2009: "Think Eye Can" (ft. Aceyalone & Myka 9)
- 2012: "The Government"
- 2014: "I Lived in a Time"
- 2014: "Walk Slower Daddy"
- 2015: "The Solution" (ft. Slug & Brother Ali)
