= Jason Goldwatch =

American director (born 1976)

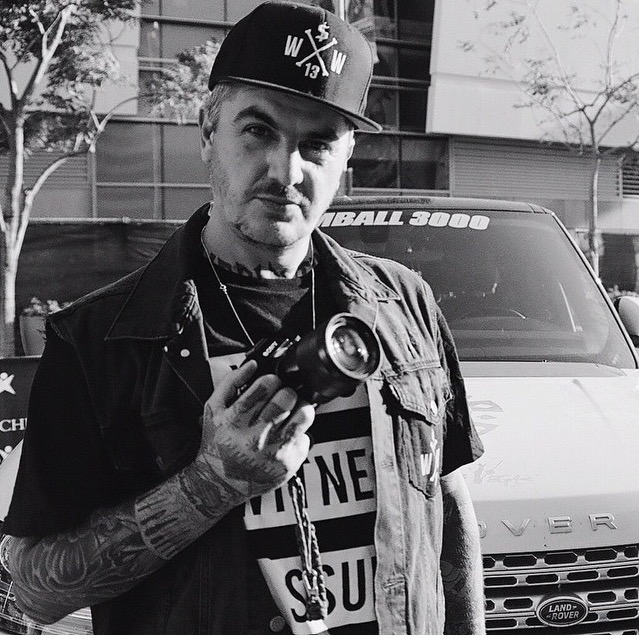
- Goldwatch in 2015
- Born: September 1, 1976 (age 50); San Francisco
- Occupations: Music video director, Commercial director
- Years active: 1994-present
- Known for: Directing music videos

Jason Goldwatch (born September 1, 1976) is an American music video director and commercial director and self described "disrupter" who is a co-founder and Executive Creative Director of Decon / Mass Appeal creative agency and record label based in New York.

== Early life ==
Goldwatch was born in San Francisco, where he attended San Francisco School of the Arts high school before attending the California Institute of the Arts.

He worked at multiple production companies (including Satellite Films, where he was recruited by Spike Jonze) before touring with Dilated Peoples, Rage Against The Machine and Kanye West as a photographer and Documentarian. (Resisting the title "videographer.")

He is best known for his directorial work with Kid Cudi, Pharrell Williams, Jay-Z, Tyler the Creator, Linkin Park, Mike Dean, Jay Electronica, Kendrick Lamar, Atmosphere, Travis Barker, Roc Marciano, Busta Rhymes, Grizelda, The Alchemist, Earl Sweatshirt, School Boy Q, Action Bronson Soul Assassins, and Dilated Peoples.

In 2000, he partnered with Peter Bittenbender on a film entitled One Big Trip, which led to their founding of Decon in 2002. The accompanying soundtrack featured DJ Shadow, Heirogliphics, Space Time Contimum and Tranquillity Bass. Having received the "Soundtrack of the Year" from "HIGH TIMES" Magazine, he established the record label with Sony Music, "DECON RECORDS" with his business partner Peter Bittenbender. One of the most recognizable aspects about the music videos and short films by Goldwatch aside from the creative ingenuity and unpredictable psychedelic edge, is that he credits himself at the beginning of each of his works. He has said it was a decision he made early on to help establish his personal brand and also because people were already misspelling his name and he considered his films as not only commercially viable pieces but simultaneously "stand out works of art.".

== Selected videography ==
=== Music videos ===
- Swollen Members – “Paradise Lost” 1994
- Swollen Members – “Deep End” 1995
- Aceyalone – “I Think” 1996
- Kool Kieth – “Plastic World” 1998
- Hieroglyphics – “Soweto” 2000
- Linkin Park – “Enth E Nd” 2002
- Aceyalone – “Give It Here” 2003
- Loot Pack – “Whenimondamic” 2006
- Loot Pack (feat. Quasimoto) – “20 Questions” 2006
- Common and Sadat X feat. Talib Kweli – “1999” 2007
- Jay-Z – “Pray” 2007
- Aceyalone (feat. Chali 2na & Bionikc) – “Eazy” 2008
- Dilated Peoples – “Worst Come To Worst” 2008
- Dilated Peoples (feat. Defari) – “Third Degree” 2008
- Dilated Peoples (feat. Erick Sermon) – "Platform Remix" 2008
- Evidence – “Mr. Slow Flow” 2008
- Ludacris – “Blueberry Yum Yum” 2008
- Busta Rhymes (feat. Estelle) – “World Go Round,” 2009
- Chali 2na (ft. Beenie Man) – “International,” 2009
- Damian Marley – “One Loaf Of Bread” 2009
- Dilated Peoples – “Work The Angels” 2009
- Evidence – “For Whom The Bell Tolls” 2009
- Evidence (feat. Defari) – "Don't Hate"
- Kid Cudi – “Soundtrack 2 My Life” 2009
- Plantlife – “Sumthin About Her” 2009
- The Alchemist – “Smile” 2009
- 88 Keys feat. Kanye West - “Stay Up (Viagra),” 2009
- Evidence – “To Be Continued,” 2010
- Gangrene – “The Sickness,” 2010
- Jay Electronica and Just Blaze – “Exhibit A” 2010
- Jay Electronica – "Abracadabra" 2010
- Jim Jones (feat. Rell) – “Blow Your Smoke” 2010
- Kid Cudi – “Cudderisback” 2010
- Kid Cudi – “Erase Me” 2010
- Kid Cudi – “Mojo So Dope” 2010
- Ninjasonik – “Bars” 2010
- The Roots – “Dear God 2.0” 2010
- Jay Electronica – “Dimethyltryptamine” 2011
- Nas – “Nasty” 2011
- Pusha T (feat. Tyler The Creator) – “Trouble On My Mind" 2011
- Pusha T – “What Dreams Are Made Of” 2011
- Rakaa (feat. Aloe Blacc) – “Crown Of Thorns” 2011
- The Alchemist (feat. Danny Brown and Schoolboy Q) – “Flight Confirmation” 2011
- Alexander Spit (feat. Bago) – “A Breathtaking Trip” 2012
- Gangrene – “Vodka & Ayahuasca” 2012
- Roc Marciano – “76” 2012
- Travis Barker and Yelawolf –“Push Em” 2012
- Jay Electronica - "Time Pieces" 2012
- Action Bronson – “Strictly For My Jeeps,” 2013
- Gangrene – “Take Drugs” 2013
- Step Brothers – “Step Masters” 2013
- The White Mandingos – “The Ghetto Is Tryna Kill Me” 2013
- Schoolboy Q – “Break The Bank” 2014
- The Alchemist – “Shut The Fuck Up” 2014
- Gangrene (feat. Action Bronson) – “Driving Gloves” 2015
- Gangrene (feat. Sean Price and Havoc) – “Sheet Music” 2015
- Gangrene – “The Last Great Disgrace” 2015
- Loudpvck – “Lit” 2015
- Code Cut Crew – "Terrible Teddy” 2016
- Code Cut Crew – "Planes" 2016
- Invisibl Skratch Piklz – “Fresh Out Of Fucks” 2016
- Travis Barker And Yelawolf – "Out Of Control” 2016
- Blink 182 – “Home Is Such A Lonely Place” 2017
- Evidence – “Jim Dean” 2017
- Evidence – "Start The Day With A Beat" 2017
- Evidence (feat. Slug) – “Powder Cocaine” 2018
- The Alchemist (feat. Earl Sweatshirt) – “E Coli” 2018
- The Alchemist (feat. Conway, Schoolboy Q and Westside Gun) – “Fork In The Pot” 2018
- Atmosphere – “Graffiti” 2018
- Atmosphere – “Virgo” 2018
- Cypress Hill (feat. Sick Jacken) – “Locos” 2018
- J Critch and Harry Fraud – “Thousand Ways” 2018
- Nas x Dave East x Lin Manuel Miranda and Aloe Blacc – “Hamilton” 2018
- Everlast – “The Cull” 2018
- Everlast – “Dream State” 2019
- Coolkids – “Dipped” 2019
- Evidence – “The Factory” 2019
- DJ Premier (feat Westside Gunn, Conway and Benny) – "Headlines" 2019
- Nas – “War Against Love” 2019
- Atmosphere – (The Day Before Halloween) : “Where The Road Forks,” “Space is Safe,” “She Loves My Not,” “The New People,” “The Future Is Disgusting,” “DoubleTown,” “Stardust,” “Blotter Acid Reflux Syndrome,” “Party Crashers,” “Sleep Apnea,” 2020
- Bam Marley – “Fight Your Fears” 2020
- Boldy James and The Alchemist – “Slow Roll” 2020
- Brother Ali – “Greatest That Never Lived” 2020
- Conway The Machine and The Alchemist – “Calvin” 2020
- Everlast – “Slow Your Roll” 2020
- Roc Marciano – “Downtown 81” 2020
- The Alchemist (feat. Westside Gun) – “Blank Canvas” 2020
- The Alchemist (feat. Westside Gun) – “Stained Glass” 2020
- Travis Barker and Run The Jewels – “Forever" 2020
- B-Real (feat. Berner) – “Number 9” 2021
- Evidence – “Start The Day With A Beat” 2021
- Kid Cudi – “Solo Dolo Pt III” 2021
- Nas – “40-16 Building” 2021
- The Alchemist and Born x Raised – “Carry The Fire,” 2021
- Westside Gun (feat. Freddie Gibbs and Roc Marciano) – “$500 Ounces” 2022
- Action Bronson – “Spirit Crocodile” 2022
- Roc Marciano and The Alchemist (feat. Ice T) – “ The Horns of Abraxas” 2022
- Kid Cudi – "I'll What I Bleed" 2023
- Kid Cudi – "SuperBoy" 2023
- The Alchemist (feat. Gangrene) – "Royal Hand" 2023
- B-Real – "That One" 2024
- The Alchemist – "Seasons Change" 2024
- Gangrene – "Watch Out" 2024
- Gangrene – "Oxnard Water Torture" 2024
- Roc Marciano (feat. The Alchemist) - "Street Magic" 2024
- B-Real x Psycho Les (Ft. Stephen Carpenter) "Lyrical Hammers" 2024
- Lord Sko " Stubborn" 2024
- B-Real (feat. Psycho Les) - "You Might Know Us" 2025
- Amanda Reifer "R U Dumb" 2025
- Lord Sko "Cigarette Butts" 2025
- Lord Sko "Problem Child" 2025
- Lord Sko and Currency "Understand" 2025
- Lord Sko "Randy Moss" 2025

=== Commercials ===
- Motor Trend "Gen
- Square Space with Eric Ripert
- Patron with Chef Marcus Samuelsson
- Converse "Chuck Test"
- "Break Through" with FUTURA 2000 and Sprite
- Mega Millions
- Absolute Vodka
- Kia Cadenza
- Tuft and Needle
- Mercedes Benz "Socially Driven"
- Toyota "Music in Motion" with Jay Electronica
- Toyota "Music in Motion" with Dougie Fresh
- 7 up with Sir Mix-A-Lot
- ChapStick
- Dutch Masters "Burn Slow" Los Angeles
- Google Glass Campaign with Young Guru and Roy Choi
- Malibu Rum
- Microsoft Zune campaign
- Teva - "The Naturist" and "Teva Life Agents"
- Sony Ericsson - "Girl What's Up?"
- Shakira - "She Wolf" online video campaign
- Kübler Absinthe online campaign
- Eminem - "Relapse" web shorts

=== Long Form ===
- "One Big Trip" (2002)
- ”Revenge of the Robots” (2003) – Def Jux documentary
- The Neptunes Presents "Clones" 2003
- "Ludacris" Red Light District (2004)
- "Ice Cream: Vol. 1" (2006)
- "Dilated Peoples: The Release Party" (2007)
- ”A Billion Bucks” (2010) – Documentary about Young Buck
- "Into The Light" Jay Electronica Documentary (2010)
- "A Million in the Morning" (2010)
- "The Journey of Mr. Rager" (2010) - Documentary about Kid Cudi
- "Time Alone" (2013)
- "Cycles" with The Alchemist (2018)
- "Death Valley" (2024) - Short film accompanying DJ Muggs's Soul Assassins third album "Death Valley"
- "424" Mike Dean (2024)

=== Television ===
- Avec Eric 2009 (Emmy Nominated for Outstanding Directing in Lifestyle and Travel)
- Nas "Illmatic" With The National Symphony Orchestra
