= Decon =

American advertising agency and record label

- Founded: 2002
- Headquarters: New York, NY, United States
- Key people: Peter Bittenbender (co-founder, CEO); Jason Goldwatch (co-founder)
- Website: www.decon.co
- Footnotes distributed by The Orchard Enterprises

Decon is a New York–based advertising agency and record label. Decon is known for their "Green Week" initiative for NBC Universal, which involved an installation at the 30 Rockefeller Center. Additionally, Decon has produced documentary-style profiles featuring Nissan Leaf. They were also involved in launch of the Fiat 500 in New York in the year 2011.

== History ==
Originally named Deconstruction Company, it was founded in 2002 by Peter Bittenbender and Jason Goldwatch after the creation of their hip-hop documentary and accompanying soundtrack, One Big Trip. The soundtrack was then released as a double-sided DVD/CD in 2002 with Hieroglyphic Imperium Records.

In 2012, Decon earned a Promax Award for work on NBCUniversal's "Green Week" campaign. That year, Misha Louy and Sacha Jenkins both joined as partners, in the Production and Entertainment divisions.

== Decon Records ==
Decon Records is an independent record label functioning as a division of Decon. It was established in 2003, with a focus on underground hip-hop recordings. In 2013, Decon Records was noted as one of Billboard’s 50 Best Independent Labels in America. Decon Records began working with the west coast collective Project Blowed to release Love & Hate by Aceyalone, which features production from El-P and RJD2. Decon Records also partnered with The Roots to establish Okayplayer Records. The label also released RJD2's Magnificent City Instrumentals (2006) and Evidence's Red Tape Instrumentals (2007). In 2008, the label released an album from 88-Keys, called The Death of Adam. The album featured Kid Cudi and Redman and was executive produced by Kanye West. The video for the lead single “Stay Up! (Viagra)” was directed by Decon co-founder Jason Goldwatch and premiered on MTV.

The following year, Decon licensed RJD2’s “A Beautiful Mine” as the theme song for the AMC show Mad Men. That year, Decon released Jay Electronica's Just Blaze-produced tracks "Exhibit A" and "Exhibit C".

The Alchemist's Russian Roulette, Gangrene's Vodka & Ayahuasca, and Roc Marciano’s Reloaded all made the HipHopDX 2012 records of the year awards list, and were favorably reviewed in Complex Magazine. XXL singled out Roc Marciano's Decon Records release, Reloaded, as the “Best Slept-On Album” of that year. In 2011, Decon earned recognition from Billboard as one of the 50 Best Indie Labels in America.

=== Roster ===
- 88-Keys
- Aaron Cohen
- Aceyalone
- Alexander Spit
- Black Milk
- Chali 2na
- Classified
- Dan the Automator
- Del the Funky Homosapien
- Dilated Peoples
- DJ Z-Trip
- Ellay Khule
- Evidence
- Freddie Gibbs
- Freestyle Fellowship
- Gangrene
- Goapele
- Haiku D'Etat
- Hieroglyphics
- Jurassic 5
- Lyrics Born
- Ninjasonik
- Nneka
- Plantlife
- Pusha T
- Rakaa
- RJD2
- Roc Marciano
- Shad
- The Alchemist
- The A-Team
- The Good Brothers
- The Hood Internet
- Wax Tailor
- Zion I

=== Selected discography ===
==== 2003 ====
- Aceyalone – Moonlit Skies
- Aceyalone – Love & Hate

==== 2004 ====
- Haiku D'Etat – Coup De Theatre
- Haiku D'Etat – Haiku D'Etat
- Aceyalone – All Balls Don't Bounce - Revisited

==== 2005 ====
- Lyrics Born – Big Money Talk

==== 2006 ====
- Aceyalone and Abstract Rude – Who Reframed The A-Team
- RJD2 – Magnificent City Instrumentals
- Aceyalone – Grand Imperial
- Aceyalone– Supahero
- Aceyalone – Magnificent City

==== 2007 ====
- Aceyalone – Lightning Strikes
- Dilated Peoples – The Release Party
- Evidence – Red Tape Instrumentals
- The Alchemist – Rapper's Best Friend

==== 2008 ====
- Jurassic 5 – Jurassic 5 (Deluxe) REISSUE
- 88-Keys – The Death of Adam
- 88-Keys – Stay Up! (Viagra) ft. Kanye West (Single)

==== 2009 ====
- Jay Electronica – Exhibit C
- Nneka – The Uncomfortable Truth
- Chali 2na – Fish Outta Water
- Jay Electronica – Exhibit A
- Aceyalone – Aceyalone and the Lonely Ones
- Evidence – The Layover

==== 2010 ====
- Gangrene – Sawblade EP
- Lyrics Born – As U Were
- Gangrene – Gutter Water
- Freddie Gibbs – Str8 Killa EP
- Rakaa – Crown Of Thorns
- Chali 2na – Fish Market 2
- Aceyalone – Hip Hop And The World We Live In REISSUE
- Aceyalone – Accepted Eclectic REISSUE
- Nneka – Concrete Jungle

==== 2011 ====
- Freestyle Fellowship – The Promise
- Goapele – Break Of Dawn
- Goapele – Play (Single)
- Roc Marciano – Greneberg
- Pusha T – Trouble On My Mind (Single)
- Classified – Handshakes and Middle Fingers
- Pusha T – My God (Single)
- Nneka – Soul Is Heavy

==== 2012 ====
- Goapele – Break Of Dawn (Deluxe)
- Roc Marciano – Reloaded
- The Hood Internet – FEAT
- Lyrics Born – As U Were (Remixes)
- The Alchemist – Russian Roulette
- The Alchemist – Flight Confirmation (Single)
- Roc Marciano – Emeralds (Single)
- The Alchemist – Rapper's Best Friend 2
- Gangrene – Vodka & Ayahuasca

==== 2013 ====
- Evidence – Green Tape Instrumentals
- Aceyalone – Leanin' On Slick
- The Hood Internet – FEAT Remixes
- Aaron Cohen- Potential Fans

== See also ==
- List of advertising agencies
- List of record labels
