= Haiku d'Etat (album) =

- Reissue edition cover

Studio album by Haiku d'Etat
- Released: 1999
- Genre: Hip-hop
- Length: 72:31
- Label: Pure Hip Hop
- Producer: Adrian Burley

Haiku d'Etat chronology
Haiku d'Etat (1999)	Coup de Theatre (2004)

Singles from Haiku d'Etat
- 1. "Los Dangerous" Released: 1997

Haiku d'Etat is the debut studio album by American hip-hop group Haiku d'Etat. It was released in 1999. In 2004, it was re-released with a different cover and a different track listing.

== Critical reception ==
Professional ratings
Review scores
Source	Rating
AllMusic	4.5/5 stars
Robert Christgau	A−

Stanton Swihart of AllMusic said: "The musical backdrop actually maintains the same high standard as the rhyming, something that had occasionally plagued past efforts from the Project Blowed crew." He called it "one of those albums destined to go undeservedly neglected but deservedly revered." Nathan Rabin of The A.V. Club said: "Haiku D'Etat gets better with each listen, with every spin yielding a greater appreciation of the three MCs' chemistry and the surprising layers of subtlety and sophistication lurking beneath the deceptively simple production." Orlando Weekly called it "one of the most amazing hip-hop albums of the decade."

The album was placed at number 22 on Robert Christgau's "Pazz & Jop 2001: Dean's List".

== Track listing ==
No.	Title	Length
1.	"Haiku d'Etat"	4:00
2.	"Non Compos Mentis"	4:19
3.	"Studio Street Stage"	4:52
4.	"Los Dangerous"	5:27
5.	"Pro Tool Robots"	3:13
6.	"Wants vs. Needs"	4:08
7.	"S.O.S."	4:29
8.	"Firecracker"	4:48
9.	"Still Rappin'"	4:53
10.	"Other MC's"	4:03
11.	"Untitled"	2:17
12.	"West Side Slip and Slide"	7:17
13.	"Kaya"	18:45

Reissue edition (2004)
No.	Title	Length
1.	"Haiku D'Etat"	4:01
2.	"Non Compos Mentis"	4:11
3.	"Studio Street Stage"	4:48
4.	"Los Dangerous"	5:26
5.	"Pro Tool Robots"	3:13
6.	"Wants vs. Needs"	4:09
7.	"S.O.S."	4:29
8.	"Firecracker"	4:46
9.	"Still Rappin'"	4:53
10.	"Other MC's"	4:02
11.	"Slower Traffic to the Right"	4:49
12.	"Kaya"	3:56
13.	"Wo Wo Wo Yeah Yeah Yeah"	2:04
