= Pigeon John discography =

The following is a list of releases by American singer/rapper Pigeon John.

== Studio albums ==
Year	Title	Record label	Ref.
2001	Pigeon John Is Clueless	THE TELEPHONE CO.	
2003	Pigeon John Is Dating Your Sister	THE TELEPHONE CO.	
2005	Pigeon John Sings the Blues!	THE TELEPHONE CO.	
2006	Pigeon John and the Summertime Pool Party	Mobile Home Recordings	
2010	Dragon Slayer	Quannum Projects	
2014	Encino Man	THE TELEPHONE CO.	
2016	Good Sinner	Dine Alone Music	
2020	Gotta Good Feelin'	Pigeon John Publishing (ASCAP) / Kobalt	

== EPs ==
Year	Title	Record label	Ref.
2022	The Bomb (20syl Remix)	The Telephone Company	
2022	The Bomb 10th Anniversary Remix	The Telephone Company	
2022	Hello Tomorrow	The Telephone Company	

== Singles ==
Year	Title	Record label	Ref.
2003	Originalz	Basement Records	
2003	Is Clueless	Basement Records	
2003	Life Goes On	Basement Records	
2004	Nothing Without You / Sleeping Giants	Basement Records	
2007	No Place (featuring Littrell)	Pigeon John & Littrell	
2011	The Bomb	Urban	
2015	Set It Loose	The Telephone Company	
2019	Runnin' It Now	Pigeon John Publishing (ASCAP / Kobalt	
2019	They Don't Make Em Like Me	Pigeon John Publishing (ASCAP / Kobalt	
2020	Gotta Good Feelin'	Pigeon John Publishing (ASCAP / Kobalt	
2020	Geeshid	Pigeon John Publishing (ASCAP / Kobalt	
2020	Gotta Good Feelin' (Live)	Pigeon John Publishing (ASCAP), JPakfar Music (BMI), Shane Eli Music (BMI)	
2020	Play It Again (Live)	Pigeon John Publishing (ASCAP), JPakfar Music (BMI), Shane Eli Music (BMI)	
2020	Runnin' It Now (Live)	Pigeon John Publishing (ASCAP), JPakfar Music (BMI), Shane Eli Music (BMI), Songtrust Blvd (BMI)	
2020	Pick It up Again (Outta My Way)	Pigeon John Publishing (ASCAP) Umana Since '87 Publishing (ASCAP)	
2020	The Greatest	Pigeon John Publishing (ASCAP) Umana Since '87 Publishing (ASCAP)	
2021	The Bomb (10 Year Anniversary Chris Coady Mix)	The Telephone Company	
2021	The Bomb (Cut Chemist Remix)	The Telephone Company	
2022	Touch the Stars	The Telephone Company	
2022	The Bomb (Headnodic Remix)	The Telephone Company	
2022	Good Times Roll (feat. India Carney)	The Telephone Company	
2022	Falling	The Telephone Company	
2023	How It Should Look	Pigeon John	

== Guest appearances ==
- Freedom of Soul - "Not This Record" from The Second Comin (1993)
- LPG - "Judge Not" from The Earth Worm (1995)
- Flynn - "Spanish Harlem" from Louder (1998)
- Flipside - "Sunny Days" (1999)
- Knowdaverbs - "Call of the Dung Beetle" from The Syllabus (1999)
- MG! The Visionary - "Scared As..." from Transparemcee (2000)
- PAX217 - "Gratitude" from Twoseventeen (2000)
- Soul-Junk - "Sea Monsters and Gargoyles" from 1956 (2000)
- .rod laver - "All Around America" from Trying Not to Try (2000)
- Murs - "The Two Step" (2000)
- 4th Avenue Jones - "Truth or Dare" from No Plan B (2000)
- DJ Maj - "Golden Motorcycle" from Wax Museum: the Mixtape (2000)
- DJ Maj - "Deception" from Full Plates: Mixtape 002 (2001)
- Flynn - "Endless Maze" from Burnt Out (2001)
- Royal Ruckus - "Pocket Lint", "Jon&Stacie", "A Las Chicas", "Easily Forgotten" and "Let's Start a Boy Band" from Pocket Lint & Spare Change (2001)
- Tapwater - "Debris", "Passion" and "The White Man" from Two Forty Five (2001)
- Red Cloud - "The Pigeon John Song" from Is This Thing On? (2002)
- Sharlok Poems - "Driven by Facts" from Left (2002)
- KJ-52 - "Revenge of the Nerds" from Collaborations (2002)
- Future Shock - "Paperweights" from The Art of Xenos: Entertaining Aliens (2002)
- DJ Maj - "God Music" from The Ringleader: Mixtape Volume III (2003)
- 4th Avenue Jones - "U Rockin'" from Hiprocksoul (2003)
- The Grouch & Eligh - "No More Greener Grass" from No More Greener Grasses (2003)
- Adventure Time - "Whetting Whistles" from Dreams of Water Themes (2003)
- Crankcase - "The Next Big Thing" (2003)
- Luke Geraty - "Brandon's Folly" and "Pandemonium" from It's Cold Out Here (2003)
- Mars Ill - "Planes and Trains" from Backbreakanomics (2003)
- Kiz Charizmatic - "The Hype, The Hustle" from Rawthentic (2003)
- Sup the Chemist - "Reaching" from Eargasmic Arrangements (2003)
- Joey the Jerk - "Same Dark Sweater" from Average Joe (2004)
- KJ-52 - "All Around the World" from 7th Avenue (2004)
- .rod laver - "The Official Pigeon John Guest Appearance" from The Dialogue: Rudolph Wayne Vs. The Man (2004)
- Shape Shifters - "Little Life" from Was Here (2004)
- Neila - "Rules" from For Whom the Bells Crow (2004)
- Braille - "It Won't Last" from Shades of Grey (2004)
- Fat Jack - "Pay Back" from Cater to the DJ Vol. 2 (2004)
- Apsci - "Stompin'" from Thanks for Asking (2005)
- Blackalicious - "Side to Side" from The Craft (2005)
- Bobby Bishop - "Show Love" from Government Name (2005)
- Cheap Cologne - "Barry Manilow Is Alive and Well" from Something Random (2005)
- Opio - "Granite Earth" from Triangulation Station (2005)
- Project Blowed - "The People" from 10th Anniversary (2005)
- Othello - "Shallow" from Alive at the Assembly Line (2006)
- JRemy - "You Don't Know Me" from Backwoods Legend (2006)
- Lightheaded - "Surprise Cypher" from Wrong Way (2006)
- KJ-52 - "Revenge of the Nerds (Horns A Plenty Remix)" from Remixed (2006)
- Lyrics Born - "I'm Just Raw (remix)" from Overnite Encore: Lyrics Born Live! (2006)
- Wordburglar - "Breeze" from Burglaritis (2006)
- Mils - "Upside Down" from The And Album (2006)
- Cookbook & Uno Mas - "Take Control" from While They Slept (2006)
- Daedelus - "Something Bells" from Something Bells EP (2006)
- 4th Avenue Jones - "Zoom" from Hip Hope Hits 2006 (2006)
- Acid Reign - "Never Fold" from Time and Change (2006)
- GRITS - "Open Bar" and "You Said" from Redemption (2006)
- Grayskul - "Dance the Frantic" from Bloody Radio (2007)
- Heath McNease - "Love Me" from The Heath McNease Fan Club Meets Tonight (2007)
- Toca - "Liar" and "Hearts and Gold" from Toca (2007)
- DJ Stibs - "WildNights" from ...And I Love Her (2007)
- Mr. J. Medeiros - "Money" from Of Gods and Girls (2007)
- Hi-Fidel & DJ Crucial - "Small Victories" from FF Express: The Company of Wolves (2007)
- Kruse - "Daydreaming" from True Stories (2007)
- Mr. J. Medieros - "Money" from Of Gods and Girls (2007)
- Redcloud - "Death of a Salesman" and "Tapatio" from Hawthorne's Most Wanted (2007)
- The Remnant - "Catch Your Breath" and "The Salute" from PB&J: Players, Babes and Jesus (2008)
- Josh Martinez - "Beerhunger Lovestory" from The World Famous Sex Buffet (2008)
- Yoni - "Fly" from End of an Era (2008)
- The Gigantics - "Memory Loss" from Die Already (2008)
- GRITS - "Beautiful Morning" from Reiterate (2008)
- General Elektriks - "Crush" (2009)
- Peter Daily - "Bright Lights Remix" from The 9th. Street Sessions EP (2009)
- Scout Da Psalmist - "Change Is Gonna Come" from Emceeing Again (2009)
- Soulico - "S.O.S." from Exotic on the Speaker (2009)
- The Grouch & Eligh - "All In" from Say G&E! (2009)
- Eligh & Jo Wilkinson - "Honor Me" and "Safe" from On Sacred Ground: Mother & Son (2009)
- Sapient - "Shoot for the Ground" from Barrels for Feathers (2010)
- Factor Chandelier - "They Don't Know" from Lawson Graham (2010)
- Eligh - "Whirlwind" from Grey Crow (2010)
- Heath McNease - "American Idle" from The Gun Show (2010)
- CookBook & UNO Mas - "Where Ya Been All My Life" from C&U Music Factory (2010)
- C2C - "Because of You" from Tetra (2012)
- Chantal Claret - "Light It Up" from The One, The Only... (2012)
- RationaL - "Dream On" from The BirthWrite LP (2012)
- Dumbfoundead - "Freedumb" from Old Boy Jon (2013)
- Blu & Cookbook - "Popeye" from Yes (2013)
- Sleep - "Truth Serum" from Oregon Failure (2014)
- The Grouch & Eligh - "Run" from The Tortoise and the Crow (2014)
- Abstract Rude - "Relay" from Keep the Feel: A Legacy of Hip Hop Soul (2015)
- Royal Ruckus - "Coulda Swore I Saw You" from The Summer of the Cicadas (2017)
