= Shockadoom =

EP by Freestyle Fellowship
- Released: 2002
- Recorded: 1998
- Genre: Hip-hop
- Length: 32:15
- Label: Whig Music
- Producers: Omid; Nobody; Sach; JMD

Freestyle Fellowship chronology
Temptations (2001)	Shockadoom (2002)	The Promise (2011)

Singles from Shockadoom
- 1. "Can You Find the Level of Difficulty in This?" Released: 1999

Shockadoom is a 2002 EP by American hip-hop group Freestyle Fellowship.

== Production ==
After releasing Innercity Griots in 1993, Freestyle Fellowship went on hiatus due to the incarceration of Self Jupiter. In 1998, the group reunited and recorded Shockadoom, which was mostly produced by Omid. It was released in 2002, a year after the release of Temptations.

== Critical reception ==
Professional ratings
Review scores
Source	Rating
AllMusic	3/5 stars
The New Rolling Stone Album Guide	3/5 stars
Pitchfork	8.4/10

Robert Gabriel of AllMusic said, "Mikah 9, Aceyalone, P.E.A.C.E., and Self Jupiter each present themselves at the top of their game throughout Shockadoom, with vocal styles that make it a point to capture both the present and the future by reviving past African-American musical traditions." Sam Chennault of Pitchfork gave the EP an 8.4 out of 10, commenting that "it makes one wonder what would have been possible if Freestyle Fellowship could've stayed together long enough to record a full length in '98, and not waited until 2001 when the synergy between the four emcees had diminished."

== Track listing ==
No.	Title	Producer(s)	Length
1.	"Can You Find the Level of Difficulty in This?"	Omid	6:14
2.	"Shockadoom"	Nobody	4:39
3.	"Got You on the Run"	Omid	4:58
4.	"Desperate"	Omid	4:32
5.	"My Leg"	Sach	1:24
6.	"Freestyle Acapella"		1:36
7.	"We Will Never..."	JMD	5:26
8.	"Once Again"	Omid	3:26
Total length:			32:15

== Personnel ==
Technical personnel

- KutMasta Kurt – mixing
- Daddy Kev – mastering
