= This Is the Life (2008 film) =

- Directed by: Ava DuVernay
- Starring: Freestyle Fellowship; Cut Chemist; Chali 2na; Abstract Rude; Medusa; Pigeon John; CVE; Busdriver
- Cinematography: Isaac Klotz
- Edited by: Spencer Averick; Krishna Devine
- Music by: Omid
- Distributed by: Forward Movement
- Release dates: February 9, 2008 (Pan African Film Festival); March 10, 2009 (United States)
- Running time: 97 minutes
- Country: United States
- Language: English

This Is the Life is a 2008 documentary film directed by Ava DuVernay, which chronicles the alternative hip hop movement that flourished in 1990s Los Angeles and its legendary center, the Good Life Cafe.

Interviewees include Myka 9 and P.E.A.C.E. of Freestyle Fellowship, Chali 2na and Cut Chemist of Jurassic 5, Medusa, Abstract Rude, Pigeon John, 2Mex, Chillin Villain Empire, Busdriver and many others. DuVernay, known at the time as Eve, was herself an MC at the Good Life open-mic as part of the group Figures of Speech.

== Good Life Cafe ==
The Good Life Health Food Centre's weekly open-mic night started in December 1989 on the corner of Crenshaw & Exposition. Promoted by B. Hall and her son R/KainBlaze with his friends The Mighty O-Roc and The Dynamic Flow, KNGR: The Underground Radio at the Good Life offered a workshop-like atmosphere for aspiring MCs, poets and musicians to hone their craft. On Thursday nights from 8-10pm, artists were allowed to perform one song. Some would perform written songs, and some would freestyle. When a performance was not up to par, the audience would call out "Please pass the mic!" and the emcee had to end the performance promptly. In addition, there was a strict policy that no cursing was allowed. B. Hall once explained, "Young people needed a place to go to develop their own art. The no-cussing policy wasn’t about us being uptight church people, it was about wanting the atmosphere of a serious arts workshop. Most of the crowd respected the rule, some said it made rapping more challenging, that it created more respect and brotherhood."

Ice Cube, Snoop Dogg, will.i.am, Common, Macy Gray, and Lenny Kravitz reportedly attended the open-mic, while artists such as The Pharcyde, Biz Markie, Fat Joe, Skee-Lo, and Kurupt occasionally performed there. Good Life regulars Rebels of Rhythm and Unity Committee came together to form Jurassic 5. Other Good Life regulars included Freestyle Fellowship, Pigeon John, Abstract Rude, Chillin Villain Empire, Rifleman Ellay Khule, Volume 10, Medusa, Figures of Speech, OMD, Spoon Iodine, Ganjah K, Fat Jack, and Emcee N.I.C.E., among many others.

== Festivals and awards ==
This Is the Life made its world premiere as a work-in-progress to a sold-out audience at the Pan-African International Film Festival in February 2008, capturing the Audience Award for Best Documentary and Special Jury mention for general documentary excellence.

The documentary went on to win Audience Awards at ReelWorld Film Festival in Toronto and Langston Hughes African-American Film Festival in Seattle. The film was selected for the invitation-only National Black Arts Festival in June 2008 in Atlanta.

On July 31, 2008, the award-winning documentary debuted as a finished work at Allison Anders' 'Don't Knock the Rock' film series in Los Angeles to a sold-out audience.

Other official festival selections include: National Black Arts Festival, BET's UrbanWorld Film Festival, San Francisco Black Film Festival, Martha's Vineyard African American Film Festival, Black Lily Film & Music Festival, Arizona Black Film Showcase and Roxbury Film Festival.

== Reviews ==
LA Weekly wrote "This Is the Life vaults into the upper echelons of must-see hip-hop documentaries. It's smart, informative, and hugely important historically". Variety wrote, "The docu is clearly the product of real love, bubbling over with enthusiastic performances and an indelible sense of place". The Los Angeles Times called the film, "A rich narrative of praise, clarification, brother-and-sisterhood and the birth of cool".

== Distribution ==
Director Ava DuVernay self-distributed This Is the Life through her Forward Movement banner. The film opened theatrically in Los Angeles on March 10, 2009, and premiered on Showtime in May 2009.
