= Tags of the Times 3 =

Compilation album by various artists
- Released: February 28, 2001
- Genre: Alternative hip-hop
- Length: 77:50
- Label: Mary Joy Recordings
- Producer: Omid; Elusive; Megabusive; Belief; Ant; Fat Jack; Daddy Kev; Aesop Rock; Buck 65; Fat Jon; Mum's the Word; Eligh; Doc Maxwell

Tags of the Times chronology
Tags of the Times Version 2.0 (1999)	Tags of the Times 3 (2001)

Professional ratings
Review scores
Source	Rating
HipHopHotSpot	10/10
Snoozer	favorable

Tags of the Times 3 is a 2001 alternative hip-hop compilation album, released by Mary Joy Recordings. It also served as a soundtrack to a documentary of the same name.

Takashi Futatsugi of Riddim named it one of the 12 best albums of 2001.

== Track listing ==
No.	Title	Artist(s)	Length
1.	"It's Crackin' (Intro)"	Omid	1:12
2.	"They Say"	Dreamweavers feat. The Grouch	4:20
3.	"Love@aol.com"	Megabusive	3:46
4.	"L.I.F.E. Gives"	Sach	3:05
5.	"Anti-Christ"	Spoon (of Iodine)	4:44
6.	"Freak What You Feel"	Scarub feat. Tiombe Lockhart	3:34
7.	"Between the Lines"	Atmosphere	5:12
8.	"Rhyme Crime Stoppers"	P.E.A.C.E.	3:48
9.	"First Things Last / Up-Right Strut (Interlude)"	Myka 9 / Omid	3:50
10.	"Wise Up"	Aesop Rock	5:23
11.	"Pack Animal"	Buck 65	5:06
12.	"It Was on This Night / Who's Listening? (Skit)"	Self Jupiter / Fat Jon & Mr. Dibbs	5:12
13.	"Future Rockers"	Aceyalone	4:13
14.	"Introducing the Brain Busters / Everyone (Interlude)"	Murs + 2Mex / Omid	4:07
15.	"Low Key"	Company Flow, Mr. Lif, BMS, and 3 Melancholy Gypsys	7:04
16.	"Confessions (of Three Men)"	Doseone, Shing02, Doc Maxwell, and Kirby Dominant	11:40
17.	"What Was It? (Outro)"	Fat Jon & Mr. Dibbs	1:34
