= Temptations (album) =

Studio album by Freestyle Fellowship
- Released: October 16, 2001
- Recorded: 2001
- Studio: Project Blowed Recordings
- Genre: Hip-hop
- Length: 43:06
- Label: Ground Control
- Producer: Josef Leimberg

Freestyle Fellowship chronology
Innercity Griots (1993)	Temptations (2001)	Shockadoom (2002)

Singles from Temptations
- 1. "Sex in the City" Released: 2001; 2. "Temptations" / "Ghetto Youth" Released: 2002

Temptations is the third studio album by American hip-hop group Freestyle Fellowship. Delayed considerably because of Self Jupiter's incarceration, it was released on October 16, 2001, through Ground Control Records. The recording sessions took place at Project Blowed Recordings in 2001. Produced by Josef Leimberg, it features guest appearances from Abstract Rude, RBX, and Supernatural.

== Critical reception ==
Professional ratings
Review scores
Source	Rating
AllMusic	2/5 stars
HipHopDX	4/5
Pitchfork	6.6/10
(The New) Rolling Stone Album Guide	2.5/5 stars
Spin	4/10
Vibe	3/5
The Village Voice	(choice cut)

Adam "D-Lo" Low of HipHopDX praised the album, stating: "interest in a few songs may wane after time, but the vast majority of this disc has high replay value". Brad Haywood of Pitchfork gave the album a 6.6 out of 10, calling it "a disappointing one". Dave Tompkins of Vibe wrote: "while the Fellowship can still run crop circles around other rappers, Temptations sounds as if each of their distinctive egos were in a different space". AllMusic's Dan LeRoy wrote: "the uncompromising attitude spelled out in the song 'No Hooks No Chorus' ends up hurting the album, as too many tracks focus almost exclusively on the lyrical end of the hip-hop equation, backing the group's rhymes with raw, repetitive grooves". Chris Ryan of Spin noted: "on Temptations, the energy and the bop is gone, replaced, for the most part, by dead G-funk rehashes". Robert Christgau of The Village Voice highlighted the song "Ghetto Youth", indicating "a good song on an album that isn't worth your time or money".

== Track listing ==
No.	Title	Length
1.	"Intro"	2:47
2.	"Ghetto Youth"	3:07
3.	"No Hooks No Chorus"	2:50
4.	"Temptations"	4:27
5.	"Seasons"	3:05
6.	"Every Reason Why"	2:16
7.	"Fragrance" (featuring Abstract Rude)	3:47
8.	"Different"	3:05
9.	"Hillcrest"	2:44
10.	"Slappy the Happy Killer Clown"	2:46
11.	"Best Rapper in the World"	1:42
12.	"Watch What You Do"	3:04
13.	"Freestyle Dedication" (featuring Supernatural)	1:57
14.	"Freestyle Fellowship" (featuring RBX)	2:06
15.	"Sex in the City"	3:23
Total length:		43:06

== Personnel ==
- Ornette "Self Jupiter" Glenn – vocals, executive producer
- Michael "Myka 9" Troy – vocals, executive producer
- Mtulazaji "P.E.A.C.E." Davis – vocals, executive producer
- Edwin "Aceyalone" Hayes, Jr. – vocals, executive producer
- Aaron "Abstract Rude" Pointer – vocals (track 7)
- Reco "Supernatural" Price – vocals (track 13)
- Eric "RBX" Collins – vocals (track 14)
- Josef Leimberg – producer
