= Unleashed (LA Symphony album) =

Studio album by L.A. Symphony
- Released: August 14, 2007
- Recorded: 1999–2006
- Genres: Hip-hop, Christian hip-hop
- Length: 68:36
- Label: Syntax
- Producers: CookBook (also exec.); Flynn Adam; Great Jsn; Madlib; Overflo; Pigeon John; Will.i.am; UNO Mas

L.A. Symphony chronology
Disappear Here (2005)	Unleashed (2007)

Professional ratings
Review scores
Source	Rating
AllMusic	4.5/5 stars
Cross Rhythms	9/10 squares
Jesus Freak Hideout	4/5 stars

Unleashed is a mixtape by American hip-hop group LA Symphony. It was released on August 14, 2007 via Syntax Records and contains unreleased songs, rarities and demos made from 1999 to 2006 and features verses from all the L.A. Symphony's original members. Production was handled by CookBook, Flynn Adam, Great Jason, Madlib, Overflo, Pigeon John, Will.i.am and UNO Mas. It features guest appearances from Awol One and Posdnuos. At the 39th GMA Dove Awards held in 2008, the album was nominated for a GMA Dove Award for Rap/Hip-Hop Album of the Year, but lost to Group 1 Crew's Group 1 Crew.

== Track listing ==
No.	Title	Producer(s)	Length
1.	"DL Drop"	Great Jason	2:31
2.	"Idle Time"	Will.i.am	3:37
3.	"All We Know"	Flynn Adam	3:12
4.	"Universal" (featuring Posdnuos)	Madlib	3:45
5.	"Chocolate City Drop"	Pigeon John	2:27
6.	"Ball Bounces"	Flynn Adam	3:29
7.	"C.rap"	CookBook	2:47
8.	"I Speak"	CookBook	2:53
9.	"Love For The Art" (featuring Awol One)	Flynn Adam	3:04
10.	"Break It Down"	Flynn Adam	3:11
11.	"Friday Night Flavas Drop"	Flynn Adam	2:11
12.	"Passionate"	CookBook	3:36
13.	"Copywrite"	Flynn Adam	3:41
14.	"Get Out The Van"	Overflo	2:30
15.	"Soul Bros."	Flynn Adam	3:22
16.	"Tour Bus"	CookBook	3:47
17.	"We Came From Beyond Drop"	CookBook	2:07
18.	"Church"	Flynn Adam	3:42
19.	"Up Down"	Flynn Adam	3:04
20.	"Girl, Interrupted"	CookBook	3:01
21.	"You (Mash Up)"	Flynn Adam	2:45
22.	"Global Takeover"	CookBook; UNO Mas (co.)	3:54
Total length:			1:08:36
