= The Abolition of Man =

1943 book by C. S. Lewis

Abolition of Man
- First edition
- Author: C. S. Lewis
- Language: English
- Subject: Value and natural law
- Publisher: Oxford University Press
- Publication date: 1943
- Publication place: United Kingdom
- Media type: Hardcover and paperback
- Preceded by: A Preface to Paradise Lost
- Followed by: Beyond Personality
- Text: Abolition of Man online

The Abolition of Man is a 1943 book by C. S. Lewis, subtitled "Reflections on education with special reference to the teaching of English in the upper forms of schools". It uses a contemporary text about poetry as a starting point for a defense of objective value and natural law. Lewis goes on to warn readers about the consequences of doing away with ideas of objective value. The book was first delivered as the Riddell Memorial Lectures on 24–26 February 1943, a series of three evening lectures at King's College, Newcastle, part of the University of Durham.

== Moral subjectivism vs. natural law ==
Lewis begins with a critical response to the "Green Book" by "Gaius and Titius": The Control of Language: A Critical Approach to Reading and Writing, published in 1939 by Alexander ("Alec") King and Martin Ketley. The "Green Book" was used as a text for upper-form students in British schools.

Lewis criticises the authors for subverting student values and claims that they teach that all statements of value (such as "this waterfall is sublime") are merely statements about the speaker's feelings and say nothing about the object. Such a view, Lewis argues, makes nonsense of value talk. It implies, for example, that a speaker who condemns some act as contemptible is really only saying, "I have contemptible feelings."

By denying that values are real or that sentiments can be reasonable, subjectivism saps moral motivation and robs people of the ability to respond emotionally to experiences of real goodness and real beauty in literature and in the world. Moreover, Lewis claims that being a consistent moral subjectivist is impossible. Even the authors of the "Green Book" clearly believe that some things, such as improved student learning, are truly good and desirable.

Lewis cites ancient thinkers such as Plato, Aristotle, and St. Augustine, who believed that the purpose of education was to train children in "ordinate affections", to train them to like and dislike what they ought and to love the good and hate the bad. Lewis claims that although such values are universal, they do not develop automatically or inevitably in children. Thus, they are not "natural" in that sense of the word, but they must be taught through education. Those who lack them lack the specifically human element, the trunk that unites intellectual man with visceral (animal) man, and they may be called "men without chests".

== Men without chests: a dystopian future ==
Lewis criticizes modern attempts to debunk natural values, such as those that would deny objective value to the waterfall, on rational grounds. He says that there is a set of objective values that have been shared, with minor differences, by every culture, which he refers to as "the traditional moralities of East and West, the Christian, the Pagan, and the Jew ...". Lewis calls that the Tao, from the Taoist word for the ultimate "way" or "path" of reality and human conduct. (Although Lewis saw natural law as supernatural in origin, as evidenced by his use of it as a proof of theism in Mere Christianity, his argument in the book does not rest on theism.)

Lewis argued that the "chest", which he viewed as the seat of emotions and moral instincts, is essential for connecting reason (the head) with appetites (the belly). Without this connection, individuals become detached from their emotions and moral compass, leading to a lack of virtue and enterprise.

Without the Tao, no value judgments can be made at all, and modern attempts to do away with some parts of traditional morality for some "rational" reason always proceed by arbitrarily selecting one part of the Tao and using it as grounds to debunk the others.

The final chapter describes the ultimate consequences of this debunking, a not-so-distant future in which the values and morals of the majority are controlled by a small group who rule by a perfect understanding of psychology, and who in turn, being able to see through any system of morality that might induce them to act in a certain way, are ruled only by their own unreflected whims. In surrendering rational reflection on their own motivations, the controllers will no longer be recognizably human, the controlled will be robot-like, and the Abolition of Man will have been completed.

An appendix to The Abolition of Man lists a number of basic values seen by Lewis as parts of the Tao, supported by quotations from different cultures. The dystopian ideas in The Abolition of Man are fleshed out in Lewis's science-fiction novel, That Hideous Strength, as Lewis himself makes clear in the preface of the story.

== Impact amongst public intellectuals ==
While the book was considered a favourite of the author, Lewis believed it was "almost totally ignored by the public."

By the 21st century, that was no longer true, at least amongst intellectuals, both Christian and non-Christian. Jonah Goldberg has assessed it to be "one of the greatest books" of its era as it is helping preserve ideas of moral absolutism. Catholic Bishop Robert Barron considers the book almost prophetic on the topic of "values", such that today they are accepted as being "projections of our feelings and subjective whims, and consequently, anyone who dares to speak of properly objective truth or objective moral value is engaging in an oppressive play of power." Carl Trueman has argued that the collection of essays is strongly relevant to today as "the turmoil in our contemporary Western world is a function of the collapse of consensus concerning what it means to be human ... a time marked by a crisis of anthropology."

Commenting on the book's more political elements, Michael Ward argues that Lewis's essay is an early warning that democracies are vulnerable to "the dangers of subjectivism." Ward writes, “Democracies can only be preserved ... if they view ethical systems in an undemocratic light.” Expanding upon this, Samuel Gregg speculates that Lewis's indirect critique of democracy may have unsettled readers immediately after its publication, given the political climate of World War II and the immediate threat of authoritarian dictatorships. In time, however, similar observations were shared and developed by both equivalent and later thinkers, such as Wilhelm Röpke, Cardinal Jean-Marie Lustiger, and Rabbi Jonathan Sacks.

Lewis's concept of the Tao has become understood as a shorthand of natural law. As such, his essay is now regarded as both key to the revival of this idea of natural law, and a strong counterpoint to ethics of Karl Barth, where morality depends on special revelation. Some legal minds have come to see Lewis's essay as bolstering the Calvinist understanding of natural law as being transcendent in nature.

Ross Douthat has written about the book's ideas many times in The New York Times, listing it as one of the books he would assign to all college students, especially as they critique the threats of modern technology. Philosopher Peter Kreeft shared this view, including it as one of six "books to read to save Western civilization," alongside Lost in the Cosmos by Walker Percy, Mere Christianity by C. S. Lewis, The Everlasting Man by G. K. Chesterton, Orthodoxy by G. K. Chesterton, and Brave New World by Aldous Huxley.

Passages from The Abolition of Man are included in William Bennett's 1993 book The Book of Virtues. As historian Paul E. Michelson points out, though, many intellectuals have been prompted by Lewis's work to argue directly against him. This includes B. F. Skinner in his work Beyond Freedom and Dignity. Skinner asserts that in his Behaviorist school of psychology, contrary to Lewis, "Man is being abolished ... What is being abolished is autonomous man— ... the man defended by the literatures of freedom and dignity."

== Modern rankings and reviews ==
- National Review ranked the book at number seven in its 100 Best Non-fiction Books of the 20th Century list.
- The conservative Intercollegiate Studies Institute ranked the book as the second-best book of the 20th century.

== In popular culture ==
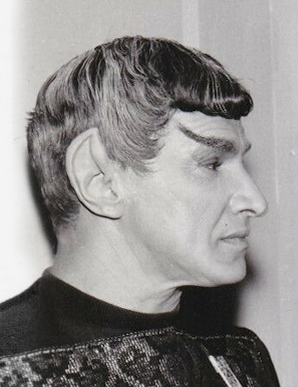
Vulcan characteristics are said to be based on the book.

A 2019 journal article, "Science Fiction and the Abolition of Man" argued that many science-fiction characters have drawn on the idea of "men without chests", including the logical Vulcans of Star Trek to the "emotionally stunted" replicants in Blade Runner.

Many ideas in Lewis' book have also appeared in music, including:

- Christian hip hop duo Mars ILL named the track "The Abolition of manCHILD" from their 2002 album Raw Material after the book.
- In 2003, the post-hardcore band Thrice based the lyrics of the song "The Abolition of Man" on the book. It is featured in the band's third album, The Artist in the Ambulance.
- TAO, the sixth studio album of Canadian rapper Shad, released in 2021, was heavily inspired by The Abolition of Man.
