= To Whom It May Concern... =

Studio album by Freestyle Fellowship
- Released: October 5, 1991
- Genre: Hip-hop
- Length: 51:17
- Label: Sun Music
- Producer: Freestyle Fellowship; Mathmattiks; Mikah 9; J. Sumbi; All in All; The Mighty O-Roc

Freestyle Fellowship chronology
To Whom It May Concern... (1991)	Innercity Griots (1993)

To Whom It May Concern... is the debut studio album by American hip-hop group Freestyle Fellowship. It was released on October 5, 1991. The 30th anniversary reissue of To Whom It May Concern... received a nomination for Best Historical Album at the 65th Grammy Awards.

== Critical reception ==
Professional ratings
Review scores
Source	Rating
AllMusic	4.5/5 stars
RapReviews	10/10
The New Rolling Stone Album Guide	4/5 stars

Scott Thill of AllMusic called the album "a potent glimpse into the subcultural, conscientious side of Los Angeles hip-hop, one that would later be eclipsed by gangsta boogie from the likes of Dr. Dre, Snoop Dogg, and all the pretenders who followed in their wake." Del F. Cowie of Exclaim! described it as "a mind-boggling collection of elastic rhymes, myriad flows and jazzy beats."

Writing for Classic Material: The Hip-Hop Album Guide, Oliver Wang said, "the album stands as one of the most influential LPs ever released on the West Coast, the fire starter for practically the entire California underground movement in the 1990s and beyond."

== Track listing ==
No.	Title	Lyrics	Music	Length
1.	"We Are the Freestyle Fellowship"	Freestyle Fellowship	Freestyle Fellowship	1:36
2.	"My Fantasy"	Aceyalone	Mathmattiks	3:53
3.	"7th Seal"	Mikah 9	Mikah 9; J. Sumbi	5:23
4.	"Let's Start Over"	Freestyle Fellowship	Freestyle Fellowship	1:14
5.	"Sunshine Men"	J. Sumbi	All in All	4:33
6.	"Physical Form"	P.E.A.C.E.	J. Sumbi	3:49
7.	"120 Seconds"	Aceyalone	The Mighty O-Roc	2:03
8.	"We Will Not Tolerate"	Freestyle Fellowship	Freestyle Fellowship	1:46
9.	"Dedications"	Freestyle Fellowship	Freestyle Fellowship	2:01
10.	"It's On"	Freestyle Fellowship	Freestyle Fellowship	0:16
11.	"Sike"	Freestyle Fellowship	Freestyle Fellowship	0:34
12.	"5 O'Clock Follies"	Mikah 9	J. Sumbi	5:56
13.	"Legal Alien"	J. Sumbi	All in All	3:45
14.	"Convolutions"	Freestyle Fellowship	Freestyle Fellowship	0:46
15.	"Jupiter's Journey"	Self Jupiter	Mathmattiks	4:18
16.	"For No Reason"	P.E.A.C.E.	Mathmattiks	3:14
17.	"Here I Am"	Aceyalone	Mathmattiks	4:15
18.	"The Future?"	Freestyle Fellowship	Freestyle Fellowship	1:32
Total length:				51:17
