= Beat cinema =

Beat Cinema
- Location: Los Angeles, California
- Type: Musical Collective
- Events: Alternative hip hop, electronic

Website
- www.beatcinema.org

Beat Cinema is an experimental hip hop, dance, and electronic music club night that takes place every month since 2009 in Los Angeles, California. Alongside their weekly events, Beat Cinema is a music collective of artists from different musical backgrounds. Since 2013 they have hosted an ambient takeover at Coachella called "The Turn Down". At first having started in the Inland Empire, they've relocated to central Los Angeles.

They have had both burgeoning and renowned artists performing there such as edIT, Open Mike Eagle, JPEGMafia, Tokimonsta, Mndsgn, Eureka The Butcher, Free The Robots, Dj Nobody, Dibiase, Daedelus, Ras G, to name a few.

A virtual reality documentary about Beat Cinema, Do What You Love: The L.A. Underground Beat Scene premiered at The LA Weekly Artopia on Aug. 26 2017. Those at the event, held at Union Station, were able to watch the short film on headsets with Beat Cinema residents.

After the retirement of Low End Theory, Beat Cinema, along with others, have filled the void of the Los Angeles Beat Scene. The Event has been described by Daedelus “Inadvertently or on purpose, they’re the future,” he says. “They’re next up.”

== Current roster ==
- wave Groove
- Rick G
- Dropdead
- Coby
- Yourself In Peace
- Black Jade
- A-Frame
- m_boogs
- Low Key

== Previous roster members (2009-2024) ==
- Deevo
- Sarahtonin
- Major Gape
- DMM
- Repeated Measures
- MsMMMcG
- DeathPxnch
- Arti
- Gypsy Mamba
- Etta
- JERMS
- SSWIII
- Demonslayer
