= Average Joe (disambiguation) =

Average Joe is a term used in North America to define a "completely average" person, typically an average American.

Average Joe may also refer to:

- Average Joe (2003 TV series), American reality show from 2003 to 2005
- Average Joe (2023 TV series), American dark comedy drama television series
- "Average Joe", episode of Dexter's Laboratory
- Average Joe, 2003 album by Joey the Jerk
- "Average Joe", 2017 song by Canadian Softball on the album Awkward & Depressed
- "Average Joe", 2010 song by Kendrick Lamar on the album Overly Dedicated

== See also ==
- Average Joes Entertainment, American record label
- Joe Average (born 1957), Canadian artist
