= Sings the Blues =

Sings the Blues!

Studio album by Pigeon John
- Released: March 8, 2005
- Studio: Holiday Inn (CAN); The Don Johnson Foundation (North Hills); The Terrordome (Miracle Mile, Los Angeles, CA); Van Nuys
- Genre: Hip-hop
- Length: 51:54
- Label: Basement Records
- Producer: Flynn; J. Boogie; Malachi Perez; Matt Mahaffey; Mils; Mr. J; Pigeon John

Pigeon John chronology
Is Dating Your Sister (2003)	Sings the Blues! (2005)	And the Summertime Pool Party (2006)

Professional ratings
Review scores
Source	Rating
AllHipHop	3/5 stars
Entertainment Weekly	A−
PopMatters	6/10

Sings the Blues is the third solo studio album by American rapper Pigeon John. It was released on March 8, 2005 via Basement Records. Recording sessions took place at the Don Johnson Foundation in North Hills, at Holiday Inn room in Canada, at The Terrordome in Miracle Mile, and in Van Nuys. Production was handled by Mr. J, Flynn, J. Boogie, Malachi Perez, Matt Mahaffey, Mils, and Pigeon John himself. It features guest appearances from Abstract Rude, Eligh, RedCloud, The Grouch and DJ Rhettmatic.

== Track listing ==
No.	Title	Writer(s)	Producer(s)	Length
1.	"Upside Down Rotten"	John Kenneth Dunkin; Justin Knight	Mils	3:22
2.	"Nothing Without You"	Dunkin	Pigeon John	4:18
3.	"Perfect Formality"	Dunkin	Pigeon John	3:53
4.	"She Cooks Me Oatmeal!"	Dunkin	Pigeon John	2:16
5.	"Sleeping Giants" (featuring The Grouch and Eligh)	Dunkin; Corey Scoffern; Eli Nachowitz; Jason Medeiros	Mr. J	3:38
6.	"Matter 101"	Dunkin	Pigeon John	2:57
7.	"You Can't Have It"	Dunkin	Pigeon John	3:17
8.	"The Grand Ol' Waltz"	Dunkin	Pigeon John; Matt Mahaffey	4:49
9.	"Life Goes On (J. Boogie Remix)" (featuring Abstract Rude and DJ Rhettmatic)	Dunkin; Aaron Pointer; Justin Boland	J. Boogie	3:21
10.	"Emily (PJ All Day Remix)"	Dunkin	Pigeon John	3:38
11.	"Identity Crisis (In Like Flynn Remix)"	Dunkin; Flynn Adam Atkins	Flynn	4:32
12.	"Rainy Day" (featuring Redcloud)	Dunkin; Henry Andrade; Malachi Perez	Malachi Perez	3:02
13.	"Draw Me"	Dunkin; Medeiros	Mr. J	8:51
Total length:				51:54
