= Good Life Cafe =

Health food market and cafe in Los Angeles, California

The Good Life Cafe was a health food market and cafe run by Janie Mae Scott-Goodkin aka IfaSade in Los Angeles, California, known for its open mic nights that helped the 1990s Los Angeles alternative hip hop movement flourish. In 2008, director Ava DuVernay, who had performed at the cafe with the Figures of Speech hip hop group, released a documentary about the cafe, This Is The Life. The film featured a number of hip hop artists discussing the importance of the Good Life Cafe to themselves and the hip hop scene. The Cafe was open from 1989 to 1999.

It was described as "a platform for rappers to perform their material" and "a testing ground for Los Angeles' independent rap scene". Artists like Ice Cube, Snoop Dogg, Lenny Kravitz, Mister CR, and others reportedly attended the open mic, while many other musicians honed their skills at the events.

== History ==
The Good Life Health Food Centre's weekly open-mic night began in December 1989. Started by B. Hall and her son R/KainBlaze with his friends The Mighty O-Roc and The Dynamic Flow, KNGR: The Underground Radio at the Good Life offered workshops for aspiring MCs, poets and musicians to hone their craft.

On Thursday nights from 8-10pm, artists were allowed to perform one song. Some would perform written songs, and some would freestyle. When a performance was not up to par, the audience would call out "Please pass the mic!" and the emcee would end the performance promptly. In addition, there was a strict policy against cursing. B. Hall once explained, "Young people needed a place to go to develop their own art. The no-cussing policy wasn’t about us being uptight church people, it was about wanting the atmosphere of a serious arts workshop. Most of the crowd respected the rule, some said it made rapping more challenging, that it created more respect and brotherhood."

After the venue closed at night, people would continue with battles in the parking lot. In December 1995, several notable performers established Project Blowed which became its own successful venue.

Lenny Kravitz, Common, Ice Cube, Snoop Dogg, will.i.am and Macy Gray reportedly attended the open-mic, while artists such as The Pharcyde, Biz Markie, Fat Joe, Skee-Lo, and Kurupt occasionally performed there.

Good Life regulars Rebels of Rhythm and Unity Committee came together to form Jurassic 5.

Other Good Life regulars included Xzibit, Monie Love, Chu Black, Dark Leaf, TrenSeta, Big Al, Quiet Storm, Menace Clan, Lenny Kravitz, Common, Snoop Dogg, will.i.am, Macy Gray, Freestyle Fellowship, The Righteous Family, Ahmad, Pigeon John, Abstract Rude, Aceyalone, Chillin Villain Empire, Rifleman Ellay Khule, Volume 10, Medusa, OMD, 2Mex The Visionaries, Spoon Iodine, Ganjah K, Fat Jack, The Nonce, The Pharcyde, Biz Markie, Fat Joe, Skee-Lo, Brand Nubian, Kurupt, N.W.A, Jurassic 5, Big Pun and Chi-Ali

The GoodLife Open Mics were hosted by individuals including Chu Black, J-Smoov of Dark Leaf, TrenSeta, Big Al, Quiet Storm, and Menace Clan's Jammin D.

The final Good Life Open Mic show was held in September 1997 and was hosted by local Good Life emcee called Ink Rezin. The Good Life Health Food Centre closed in 1999. Regulars of the open mic night later founded Project Blowed, a hip-hop workshop.
