= Hip-Hopera =

Studio album by Volume 10
- Released: April 26, 1994
- Genre: Hip hop
- Length: 61:49
- Label: Immortal; RCA; BMG
- Producer: Moe Doe; Bosco Kante; Fat Jack; Baka Boyz; Theodore Stanley; Cut Chemist; DJ Homicide; Massive; Coze; Soup; Stone the Lunatic

Volume 10 chronology
Hip-Hopera (1994)	Psycho (2000)

Singles from Hip-Hopera
- 1. "Pistolgrip Pump" Released: 1993; 2. "Sunbeams" Released: 1994

Professional ratings
Review scores
Source	Rating
AllMusic	4/5 stars
RapReviews	7.5/10
The Source	3.5/5 stars

Hip-Hopera is the debut studio album by Volume 10. It was released on Immortal Records and RCA Records in 1994. It peaked at number 66 on Billboard's Top R&B/Hip-Hop Albums chart.

== Track listing ==
No.	Title	Producer(s)	Length
1.	"A'cappella / Stylesondeck"	Moe Doe; Bosco Kante	4:13
2.	"Where's the Sniper?"	Bosco Kante	4:34
3.	"A Real Freestyle"	Fat Jack	4:49
4.	"Pistolgrip Pump"	Baka Boyz	2:57
5.	"Mom & Deb"	Fat Jack	1:33
6.	"Sho Is Hype"	Theodore Stanley; Cut Chemist	5:22
7.	"Hip-Hopera"	Baka Boyz	4:58
8.	"Interlude / Tops Wall"	DJ Homicide	1:05
9.	"First Born"	Fat Jack	4:49
10.	"Knockoutchaskull"	Moe Doe; Bosco Kante	3:02
11.	"Home Alone"	Fat Jack	3:27
12.	"Harderthanallya'll"	Massive; Fat Jack	4:03
13.	"Sunbeams"	Coze; Soup; Stone the Lunatic	3:00
14.	"Tops Toe"	DJ Homicide	0:59
15.	"Flow Wood"	Baka Boyz	3:34
16.	"Tricks-N-Hoes"	Fat Jack	3:52
17.	"What's Up To..."	Fat Jack	4:03

== Charts ==
Chart	Peak position
US Top R&B/Hip-Hop Albums (Billboard)	66
