= World Ultimate =

Studio album by the Nonce
- Released: February 28, 1995
- Studio: Kitchen Sync Studios, Hollywood, California, U.S.
- Genre: Hip hop
- Length: 51:03
- Label: American; Wild West
- Producer: The Nonce

The Nonce chronology
World Ultimate (1995)	The Sight of Things (1998)

Singles from World Ultimate
- 1. "Mix Tapes" Released: 1994; 2. "Bus Stops" Released: 1995

World Ultimate is the first studio album by American hip hop group the Nonce. It was released by American Recordings and Wild West Records on February 28, 1995. "Bus Stops" peaked at number 44 on the Billboard Hot Rap Songs chart.

== Critical reception ==
Professional ratings
Review scores
Source	Rating
AllMusic	3/5 stars
Billboard	mixed
Muzik	4/5 stars

Glen Sansone of CMJ New Music Monthly stated that "World Ultimate tips its cap to both L.L. Cool J and MC Shan, while joining loose, outgoing B-Boy posturing with old-school beats jacketed in an ethereal coating, as on 'Mix Tapes.'" The Village Voice called "Keep It On" "perfect, passages of cool jazz chording blending into flat noise and movement."

Steve Huey of AllMusic wrote, "Occasionally, the duo can get a little too relaxed, but on the whole it's an engaging alternative to the standard West Coast gangsta fare." Matt Welty of Complex commented that "MCs Nouka Basetype (who would later go by Sach) and Yusef Afloat came together with their conscious perspectives to rap over jazzy instrumentation about everything from taking the bus to the issues plaguing hip-hop." In 2012, Fact included the album on the "Most Overlooked Hip-Hop LPs of the 90s" list.

== Track listing ==
No.	Title	Length
1.	"On the Air"	4:00
2.	"Keep It On"	4:13
3.	"Bus Stops"	4:12
4.	"The West Is..."	4:25
5.	"Mix Tapes"	3:30
6.	"Testing"	0:42
7.	"World Ultimate"	5:09
8.	"Good to Go"	4:25
9.	"On the Road Again"	5:01
10.	"Hoods Like to Play"	3:58
11.	"J to the I"	4:18
12.	"Eighty Five"	2:45
13.	"Mix Tapes (1926 Sunday Night Remix)"	4:47
Total length:		51:03

== Personnel ==
Credits adapted from liner notes.

The Nonce

- Nouka Basetype – vocals, production, cover concept
- Yusef Afloat – vocals, production, cover concept

Additional personnel

- Aceyalone – additional vocals (3)
- Butta B. – additional vocals (4)
- Meen Green – additional vocals (4)
- Figures of Speech – background vocals (9)
- Sean Freehill – recording
- Tom Coyne – mastering
- Morris "Mo" Taft – executive production, cover concept
- Aldo Sampieri – art direction
- Susan Goines – cover photography
- Dorothy Low – inside folder photography
