= Backbreakanomics =

Studio album by Mars Ill
- Released: August 19, 2003
- Genre: Alternative hip hop
- Length: 64:44
- Label: Gotee Records
- Producer: Dust, Playdough

Mars Ill chronology
Sound Methods (2002)	Backbreakanomics (2003)	Sound Methods 2.0 (2004)

Professional ratings
Review scores
Source	Rating
Allmusic	4/5 stars
HipHopDX	3.5/5 stars
XLR8R	(favorable)

Backbreakanomics is a studio album from American underground hip hop duo Mars Ill. It was released on Gotee Records in 2003.

== Track listing ==
No.	Title	Producer(s)	Length
1.	"Eighty Eight"	Dust	1:13
2.	"Breathe Slow"	Dust	4:33
3.	"Planes and Trains" (featuring Blueprint and Pigeon John)	Dust	3:50
4.	"Afterlife"	Dust	4:19
5.	"Black Box Artist (Boom Bap)"	Dust	4:12
6.	"Inside Out"	Dust	4:31
7.	"Enterchange"	Dust	4:04
8.	"Let Me"	Dust	1:11
9.	"Alpha Male"	Dust	4:03
10.	"PSA #428"	Dust	2:13
11.	"Freeze Framework"	Dust	3:07
12.	"Sideline Speech" (featuring Bigg Jus)	Dust	5:37
13.	"Next Door"	Dust	4:08
14.	"Piecemeal"	Dust	3:29
15.	"Stepson"	Dust	0:33
16.	"Sunstep"	Dust	3:54
17.	"Lump Sum"	Playdough	3:45
18.	"The Calm Before"	Dust	4:19
19.	"He"	Dust	1:33
