= Raw Material (album) =

Studio album by Mars Ill
- Released: 2000
- Recorded: 2000
- Genre: Hip-hop
- Length: 71 minutes and 09 seconds
- Label: Sphere of Hip Hop Records
- Producer: Dust

Mars Ill chronology
Raw Material (2000)	Raw Material (Uprok) (2002)

Raw Material. is a Mars Ill album released in 2000, on Sphere of Hip Hop Records.

== Track listing ==
1. Mars Ill
2. Sphere of Hip-Hop
3. We'll Live Underground
4. Black Market (ft. Playdough of Deepspace5)
5. Love's Not (ft. Rahlo of Blacksoil Project)
6. Monotone
7. Unsound
8. Send a Man
9. Compound Fractures (ft. Sintax.the.Terrific of Deepspace5)
10. Rap Fans (ft. Sharlock Poems of L.A. Symphony)
11. Under the Sun (ft. Listener of Deepspace5)
12. Sounds of Music (ft. Rahlo of Blacksoil Project and Sintax.the.Terrific of Deepspace5)
13. Who Will Answer? (ft. Remnant)
14. Indulgent Instrumental #1
15. Try Again (ft. Adam Atkins)
16. Touch and Go (ft. Sev Statik of Deepspace5)
17. Indulgent instrumental #2
18. The End

== Re-release ==
The album was re-released in 2002 by Uprok Records.
