= ProPain (album) =

Studio album by Mars Ill
- Released: October 19, 2004
- Genre: Hip hop
- Length: 62 minutes and 15 seconds
- Label: Gotee

Mars Ill chronology
Sound Methods 2.0 (2004)	ProPain (2004)	Pirate Radio (2004)

Professional ratings
Review scores
Source	Rating
Rapzilla	link

ProPain is a 2004 album by hip-hop duo Mars Ill.

== Track listing ==
1. Pro Pain Intro
2. Say So
3. Sound Off
4. Dog Ear Page
5. More ft. Ahmad of 4th Avenue Jones and Anthony David
6. Just the Two of Us
7. Stand Back and Watch
8. Wicked Ways
9. All Out
10. Saturday Night Special ft. Ishues and D.R.E.S the Beatnik
11. Higher
12. Moment
13. Effortless ft. XL:144
14. Loud!
15. Write of Passage ft. Ben Hameen and J-Mil
16. When Heaven Scrapes the Pavement
17. I Is
18. We Out

== Re-releases ==
ProPain was re-released as Pro*Pain in 2006 and a remix, Slow Flame, was released in 2007.
