= Machines Hate Me =

Studio album by Dibiase
- Released: September 14, 2010
- Genre: Instrumental hip-hop
- Length: 38:37
- Label: Alpha Pup Records
- Producer: Dibiase

Dibiase chronology
Machines Hate Me (2010)	Sound Palace (2011)

Machines Hate Me is the first studio album by American record producer Dibiase. It was released via Alpha Pup Records on September 14, 2010. A music video was created for "Skullcrack".

== Critical reception ==
Professional ratings
Review scores
Source	Rating
Pitchfork	5.8/10
Potholes in My Blog	2/5 stars
Resident Advisor	4.0/5
URB	4/5 stars

Andrew Ryce of Resident Advisor gave the album a 4.0 out of 5, commenting that "Dibiase wisely avoids the schizophrenic channel-skipping to which his peers are so often prone, building tunes armed with an exacting focus, even when it seems like brilliant ideas are defiantly tossed off." Jacqueline Whatley of URB gave the album 4 out of 5 stars, writing, "In an hour of utter brilliance, Dibiase offers the world a taste of what exists on the innovative Los Angeles underground and an exciting idea of what is to come." Jeff Weiss of Los Angeles Times wrote, "Machines Hate Me represents the most complete and fully realized iteration of Dibiase's work."

== Track listing ==
No.	Title	Length
1.	"Eternia"	2:10
2.	"Phantom Power"	2:25
3.	"Dusty Lungz"	2:15
4.	"Atombreakin"	2:36
5.	"Lumberjack"	3:06
6.	"Neighborhood Watch"	2:31
7.	"Skullcrack"	3:19
8.	"Circuit Breakin"	2:16
9.	"Clocked Out"	3:13
10.	"Dubwreck"	2:34
11.	"Price Is Righteous"	2:00
12.	"Life Force"	2:24
13.	"3 Way Mirrors"	2:16
14.	"Renegade Slap" (Devonwho Collab)	2:57
15.	"Abstract"	2:34
