= The World Famous Sex Buffet =

Studio album by Josh Martinez
- Released: September 30, 2008
- Genre: Alternative hip hop
- Length: 59:10
- Label: Camobear Records
- Producer: Pale Soul, Bass Boy Blue, Sichuan, S-One, Mcenroe, Gordski, U-Tern, Smoke, Samix, Classified, Metty the Dert Merchant, Zebulon Dak, Elliot B.

Josh Martinez chronology
Midriff Music (2005)	The World Famous Sex Buffet (2008)	Pissed Off Wild (2011)

Professional ratings
Review scores
Source	Rating
Exclaim!	favorable
PopMatters	5/10 stars

The World Famous Sex Buffet is a studio album by Canadian rapper Josh Martinez. It was released on Camobear Records in 2008.

"Underground Pop" was chosen by Willamette Week as their Cut of the Day on September 18, 2008.

== Track listing ==
No.	Title	Producer	Length
1.	"All Rapped Out"	Pale Soul	3:08
2.	"Ritalin Future Sounds"	Bass Boy Blue	3:38
3.	"Grown Folk Music"	Sichuan	4:25
4.	"Responsibility" (featuring Evil)	S-One	3:40
5.	"Struts" (featuring Awol One)	Mcenroe	3:37
6.	"Underground Pop" (featuring Moka Only and Skratch Bastid)	Gordski	4:32
7.	"Fight or Fuck"	U-Tern	4:32
8.	"Beerhunger Lovestory" (featuring Pigeon John and Sleep)	Smoke	3:30
9.	"Absinth Tears" (featuring Mother Mother)	Samix	3:29
10.	"Trickle Down Trauma"	Bass Boy Blue	3:24
11.	"Hurricane Jane" (featuring Devin the Dude)	U-Tern	3:44
12.	"Going Back to Hali" (featuring Classified and Skratch Bastid)	Classified	4:24
13.	"Jokes Yo!"	Metty the Dert Merchant	4:06
14.	"Bobby Loveable"	Zebulon Dak	3:37
15.	"Goodnight Sweetheart"	Elliot B.	5:23
