= Peace (rapper) =

American rapper (1974–2025)

P.E.A.C.E.

Background information
- Also known as: The Galaxy Ranger, Jarvis Frye
- Born: Mtulazaji Issan Davis; June 15, 1974; Dallas, Texas, United States
- Origin: Los Angeles, California, United States
- Died: October 24, 2025 (aged 51) Oakland, California, United States
- Genres: Alternative hip-hop; underground hip-hop; freestyle rap
- Occupation: Rapper
- Years active: 1989–2025
- Labels: Project Blowed; Battle Axe Records
- Formerly of: Freestyle Fellowship

Mtulazaji Issan Davis (June 15, 1974 – October 24, 2025), better known by his stage name P.E.A.C.E., was an American rapper from Los Angeles, California. He was a member of Freestyle Fellowship along with Aceyalone, Myka 9 and Self Jupiter. He released two solo albums.

== History ==
Mtulazaji Davis was born in Dallas, Texas, and raised in Los Angeles, California.

He began rapping in his high school years. He joined the freestyle rap community in Los Angeles and began performing at open mics at the Good Life Cafe. He met Aceyalone, Myka 9, and Self Jupiter at the cafe, and the group formed Freestyle Fellowship.

Freestyle Fellowship released their debut album To Whom It May Concern... in 1991. P.E.A.C.E. had two songs, "Physical Form" and "For No Reason", on the album. Their second album, Innercity Griots (1993), has been described as "an acknowledged underground masterpiece". Following Self Jupiter's incarceration the group went on hiatus. The group reunited to release Temptations in 2001 and Shockadoom in 2002. Self Jupiter's second incarceration led to another hiatus until 2009. The group then released their fourth album, The Promise, in 2011.

In 1999, PEACE battled Eyedea at the Scribble Jam finals and became runner-up, taking second place in the MC battle competition.

He released his first solo album, Southern Fry'd Chicken, in 2000. His second solo album, Megabite, was released in 2004 through Battle Axe Records. He was a contributor to Project Blowed, an open mic workshop and label.

Davis died October 24, 2025, at the age of 51.

== Film ==
P.E.A.C.E. was featured in the award-winning documentary This Is the Life, chronicling the music movement that was birthed at the Good Life Cafe in South Central, Los Angeles, where he first performed with Freestyle Fellowship in the early 1990s.

== Discography ==
Solo

- Southern Fry'd Chicken (2000)
- Megabite (2004)

with Freestyle Fellowship

- To Whom It May Concern... (1991)
- Innercity Griots (1993)
- Temptations (2001)
- Shockadoom (2002)
- The Promise (2011)

Guest appearances

- Aceyalone - "B-Boy Kingdom" from All Balls Don't Bounce (1995)
- Omid - "When the Sun Took a Day Off and the Moon Stood Still" "You Are in My Clutches" "What Up" from Beneath the Surface (1998)
- Fat Jack - "I Don't Gang Bang" "It's a Packed House" from Cater to the DJ (1999)
- Haiku D'Etat - "Kaya" from Haiku D'Etat (1999)
- The A-Team - "O.G. Crew (Heavyweights Round 3)" from Who Framed the A-Team?
- Aceyalone - "Microphones" from Accepted Eclectic (2000)
- Abstract Rude + Tribe Unique - "Heavyweights Round 4" from P.A.I.N.T. (2001)
- Daddy Kev - "Walking on Water" from Lost Angels (2001)
- Fat Jack - "Talk to Your Brotha" from Cater to the DJ 2 (2004)
- Diplo - "Indian Thick Jawns" from Florida (2004)
- Blackalicious - "Ego Sonic War Drums" from The Craft (2005)
- Myka 9 - "Viles" from Citrus Sessions Vol.1 (2006)

Compilation appearances

- "Heavyweights Round 2" on Project Blowed (1995)
- "Rhyme Crime Stoppers" on Tags of the Times 3 (2001)
