= Harmony Dust =

American social activist for women

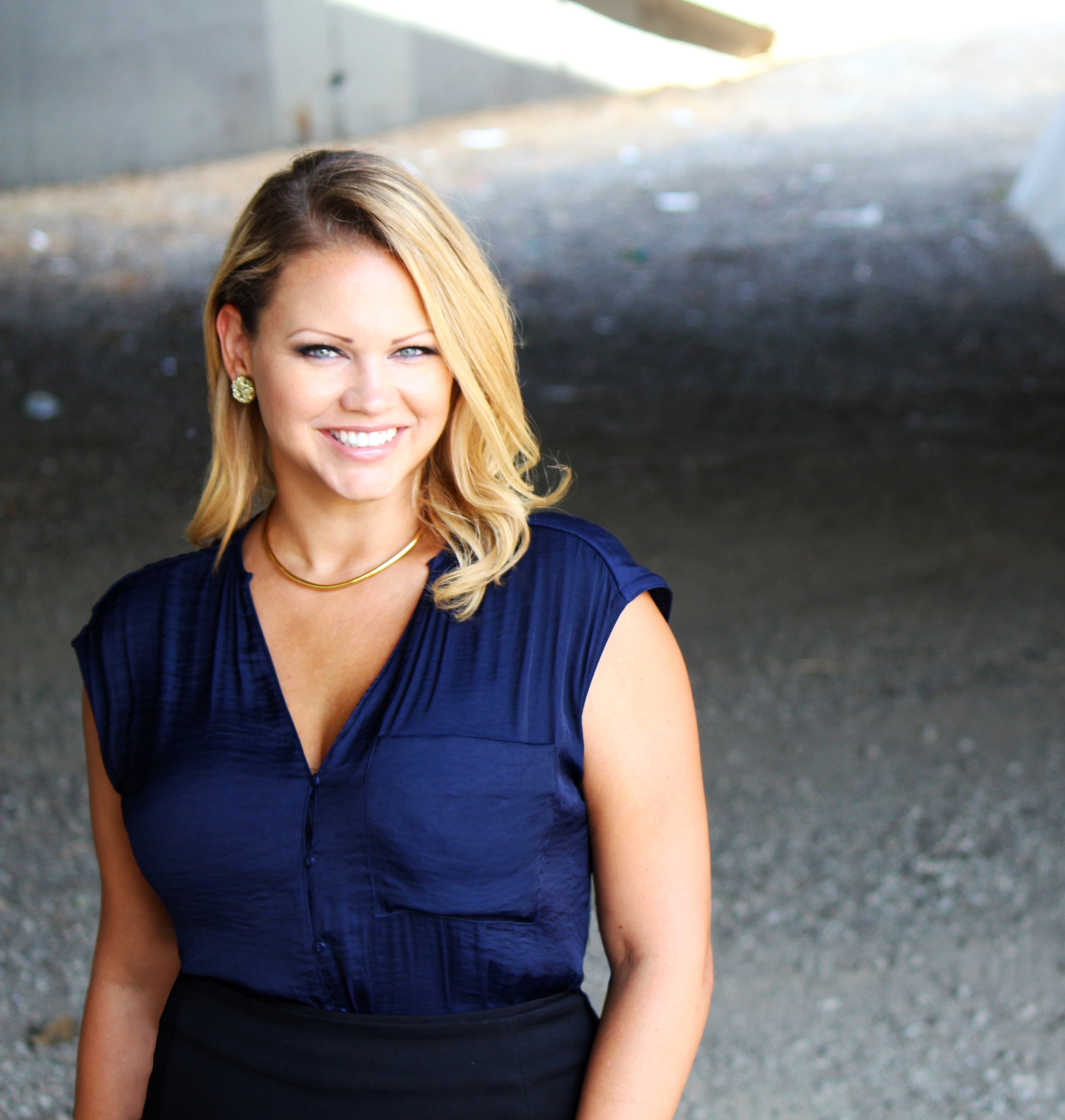
- Harmony Dust
- Born: August 12, 1976 (age 50)
- Other names: Harmony Huhn, Harmony Andrade, Harmony Grillo
- Occupations: Activist, author
- Notable work: Scars & Stilettos: The Transformation of an Exotic Dancer
- Website: harmonydust.com iamatreasure.com

Harmony Star Dust (born August 12, 1976) is an American social worker, author, survivor leader, anti-trafficking advocate and founder of Treasures, a nonprofit organization serving women affected by the commercial sex industry, sexual exploitation and trafficking.

== Early life ==
Harmony was raised in Venice, California. As a teenager, she spent time in a county run group home. She has spoken publicly about experiencing childhood abuse and instability. She and her younger brother were left by their mother at the age of 13 and 8 respectively. They spent the summer fending for themselves before she became involved with an older boy in her neighborhood. This young man became her pimp when she entered the sex industry as an exotic dancer at the age of 19, using the stage name Monique. She quit when she became a Christian in 1998.

== Career ==
In 2000, Dust graduated magna cum laude from UCLA with a bachelor's degree in Psychology and later earned a master's degree in social welfare from UCLA. After completing her graduate studies, she worked as a children's social worker for the Department of Children and Family Services.

In 2003, while completing her master's degree, Dust founded Treasures, initially known as Treasures Out of Darkness. The organization began by conducting outreach to women working in strip clubs in the Los Angeles area, distributing gift bags containing personal-care items and information about available support. Treasures later expanded its services to include support groups, peer mentoring, education, employment assistance, and other resources for women affected by the commercial sex industry and trafficking.

Dust has also mentored women transitioning out of the commercial sex industry. Former adult performer Crissy Moran has publicly identified Dust as her mentor and described Treasures as an important source of support after leaving the adult industry.

During her time at DCFS, she was a member of the National Association of Social Workers. In 2007, she received the Dorothy F. Kirby Outstanding Youth Social Worker Award from the California chapter of the National Association of Social Workers. She received both mayoral and Congressional recognition for her work in 2018. A flag was flown in her honor over the United States Capitol on May 19, 2018.

In 2010, Dust published her memoir Scars & Stilettos: The Transformation of an Exotic Dancer. The second edition was released in 2018 and retitled "Scars and Stilettos: A Memoir of Childhood Abuse, Exploitation, Strip Clubs and Finding Freedom From It All." She was featured in Glamour magazine and seen on The Tyra Banks Show, NPR, Buzzfeed and Sex Rehab with Dr. Drew. In 2022, the Los Angeles Times described Dust as an international advocate, speaker and author on sex trafficking and as a survivor of commercial sexual exploitation.

In 2005 Treasures began training others to replicate the Treasures model of outreach and care. In 2011, Treasures partnered with Craig Gross of xxxchurch.com to create The Strip Church Network. They have since parted ways and Dust and her team continue to train other leaders around the globe as a part of the Treasures Network. As of 2018, they have trained outreaches in over 200 cities on 6 continents.

In May 2021 Dust gave a TEDx talk entitled "The Oldest Oppression in the Book" which addressed issues around prostitution and the movement to decriminalize it. The talk was given without an audience present because of the COVID-19 pandemic. In October of that year TED decided to no longer list the video on their website and Youtube channel citing that the video "falls outside the content guidelines TED gives TEDx organizers around political agendas." Dust herself claims that the unlisting is because the content of her talk does not match TED's political views. She re-published the talk on her own Youtube channel under the title "Should Prostitution Be Legal?"

== Personal life ==
Dust married hip hop singer Pigeon John (formerly John Dunkin) in 2002. They divorced in 2010, and have one daughter together.

== Published works ==
- Scars & Stilettos: The Transformation of an Exotic Dancer (2010)
- "Scars and Stilettos: A Memoir of Childhood Abuse, Exploitation, Strip Clubs and Finding Freedom From It All" (2nd Edition), 2020
- "Someone I Love: A Guide to Helping Those Stuck in Harmful Behaviors and Relationships", 2020
- "Live Free Vol 1: Free To Thrive: A Curriculum Empowering You to Live Your Best Life", 2024
