= Brainwash Projects =

American hip hop group

- Origin: United States
- Genres: Hip hop
- Years active: 1991–present
- Labels: Jackson Rubio
- Members: Pigeon John bTwice
- Past members: Soda Saducee

Brainwash Projects is a hip hop group formed by LA Symphony members Pigeon John and bTwice. The duo released their first album The Rise and Fall of (Brainwash Projects) on Jackson Rubio.

== Releases ==
- Ride the Dolphin EP (Unreleased demo) (Circa 1995)
- The Rise and Fall of Brainwash Projects (1998)
