= Innercity Griots =

Studio album by Freestyle Fellowship
- Released: April 28, 1993
- Genre: Hip-hop
- Length: 65:25
- Labels: 4th & B'way; Island; PolyGram
- Producers: Freestyle Fellowship; the Earthquake Brothers; Bambawar; Daddy-O; Edman; JMD; Kevin O'Neal

Freestyle Fellowship chronology
To Whom It May Concern... (1991)	Innercity Griots (1993)	Temptations (2001)

Singles from Innercity Griots
- 1. "Bullies of the Block" Released: 1992; 2. "Hot Potato" Released: 1993

Innercity Griots is the second studio album by American hip-hop group Freestyle Fellowship. It was released on April 28, 1993, on 4th & B'way Records and distributed through Island Records.

== Critical reception ==
Professional ratings
Review scores
Source	Rating
AllMusic	5/5 stars
Christgau's Consumer Guide	(neither)
Entertainment Weekly	A−
Pitchfork	9.0/10
Q	4/5 stars
The Source	3.5/5 stars
Tom Hull – on the Web	B+

Nathan Bush of AllMusic praised the group's creativity and range as well as the album's production, which he felt showed an improvement from their previous effort. Jihad Hassan Muhammad of The Dallas Weekly commented that "they gave an unlikely musical offering at the time when everything was gangs and sets thrown as far as hip-hop was concerned in Los Angeles."

In 2012, The Daily Californian included it on the "10 Albums for the Hip-Hop Layman" list. In 2013, Spin included it on its list of the 50 best rap albums of 1993. In 2015, NME placed it at number 51 on its list of the "100 Lost Albums You Need to Know".

== Track listing ==
No.	Title	Writer(s)	Length
1.	"Bullies of the Block"	Freestyle Fellowship; Bambawar	4:55
2.	"Everything's Everything"	Freestyle Fellowship; The Earthquake Brothers; L. McCann	3:47
3.	"Shammy's"	Freestyle Fellowship; The Earthquake Brothers; Daddy-O	4:16
4.	"Six Tray"	M. Davis; The Earthquake Brothers	4:39
5.	"Danger"	Freestyle Fellowship; The Earthquake Brothers	3:58
6.	"Inner City Boundaries" (featuring Daddy-O)	Freestyle Fellowship; Daddy-O; R. Willis	4:39
7.	"Cornbread"	E. Hayes, Jr.	4:21
8.	"Way Cool"	Freestyle Fellowship; G. Redd; R. Bell; R. Mickens; D. Thomas; R. Westfield; G. Brown; C. Smith	4:22
9.	"Hot Potato"	Freestyle Fellowship; Edman; M. Rice; J. Gillespie	4:30
10.	"Mary"	E. Hayes, Jr.; M. Troy; O. Glenn; H. Mancini	3:45
11.	"Park Bench People"	M. Troy; The Earthquake Brothers	4:59
12.	"Heavyweights" (featuring Cockney "O" Dire, Archie, Volume 10, Spoon, and Ganja K Chronic)	Freestyle Fellowship; The Heavyweights; The Earthquake Brothers	6:11
13.	"Respect Due"	Freestyle Fellowship; The Earthquake Brothers	3:53
14.	"Pure Thought" (CD bonus track)	Freestyle Fellowship; W. Cobham	3:04
Total length:			65:25

== Personnel ==
Information taken from the liner notes.

- Freestyle Fellowship: Myka 9, Aceyalone, Peace, and Self Jupiter.
- The Earthquake Brothers: The Jamm Messenger D, Mathmattiks, and The Mighty O-Roc.
- Freestyle Fellowship – vocals, production, mixing
- The Earthquake Brothers – production, mixing
- Bambawar – production, mixing
- Daddy-O – vocals, production, engineering
- Edman – production
- JMD – bass guitar, timpani, drums, percussion, production
- Kevin O'Neal – upright bass, production
- Kim Buie – executive production
- Kedar Massenburg – executive production, mixing
- Matt Hyde – engineering, mixing
- Rich Herrera – engineering, mixing
- Dawud – engineering
- Aceyalone – mixing
- Ed Lawson – mixing
- Robert Harris – bass guitar
- Don Littleton – percussion
- Marvin McDaniel – acoustic guitar
- Rodney Millon – guitar
- Onaje Murray – vibraphone
- Tom Ralls – trombone
- Christy Smith – bass guitar, upright bass
- Alfred Threats – bass guitar
- Jon Williams – trumpet
- Randall Willis – tenor saxophone, saxophone, flute
- DJ Kiilu – turntables
- Mathmattiks – turntables
- Spoon – vocals
- Cockney "O" Dire – vocals
- Archie – vocals
- Volume 10 – vocals
- Ganja K Chronic – vocals
