= Mister CR =

- Also known as: Mista CR, C-Rag
- Origin: South Los Angeles California, United States
- Genres: Hip hop, gangsta rap
- Occupation: Rapper
- Years active: 2007-present
- Label: Independent Project Blowed
- Website: www.mistercr.bandcamp.com

Mister CR is an underground hip-hop artist from South Los Angeles, California (formally known as "South Central Los Angeles".)

== Career ==
Mister CR began rapping when he first performed at "The Good Life Cafe", where as time progressed, he gained recognition for his skills as an emcee. He is known for his unique delivery which consists of fast multi-syllabic rhymes.

His latest project is "All Green Everything" which was released July 23, 2015.

== Discography ==
=== Mixtapes and EPs ===
- Dead On The Dance Floor (2011)
- Unsolicited Material (2011)
- Mister CR and DJ Seedless presents "the Def Satellite" (2012)
- Good Life Bullyz Old School Mixtape (2012)
- Bully Business (2013)
- QuiCC tEasEr EP (2013)
- 4 Hustlas only (2014)
- The Perspective of a Good Life Bully (2014)
- ALL GREEN EVERYTHING (2015)

=== Other related releases ===
- 2014 : Mister Cr feat. Color da Hustla - Fucc Everybody
- 2016 : Mister CR feat. Macc Niph - Westcoast Bound prod. Ill Slim Collin
- 2018 : Mister CR feat. Fox Jones - Shooters
- 2020 : Mister CR feat. Ktoefornia - Ape Shit prod. Hash Beatz
