= Project Blowed =

American hip-hop group

- Founded: 1994; 32 years ago
- Founder: Aceyalone; Abstract Rude
- Genre: Underground hip-hop
- Country of origin: United States
- Location: Los Angeles, California
- Official website: Project Blowed on X

Project Blowed is an open-mic workshop, its affiliated underground hip-hop crew, and record label based in Los Angeles, California at Leimert Park. This hip-hop function started in 1994 and features many music groups, emcees, dancers, music producers, and graffiti artists local to the Southern California area.

== History ==
The roots of Project Blowed can be traced back to the former Good Life Cafe, a health food center in then-called South Central Los Angeles, California. It was described by UGSMAG as "a platform for rappers to perform their material" and "a testing ground for Los Angeles' independent rap scene". Lenny Kravitz, Snoop Dogg, Ice Cube, and cast members of the show Beverly Hills, 90210 reportedly attended the open-mic.

In 1994, Aceyalone and Abstract Rude produced the original Project Blowed compilation album. It was released in 1995. In 2005, Project Blowed released a follow-up album, Project Blowed: 10th Anniversary, on Decon.

== Social impact ==
Project Blowed is the essential outlet for much of the LA underground hip-hop culture. It is a place that many people of all genders can go to freestyle, rhyme, or just speak what is on their mind. Project Blowed was a turning point for the underground culture; it "did not fan the flames of urban decay and societal attacks. Project Blowed was putting out the fire." Rappers were required to pay a small fee to enter a battle and formally introduce themselves, and "MCs generally did not resort to homophobic slurs or excessive name calling during rap battles, as such behavior denoted lack of skill." This group discouraged violent activity among the youth and encouraged strict norms and respect.

Blowed events provided a "creative outlet and alternative career outside of gang life" for young black men. One of these men, Trenseta, after time in jail, spent time mentoring young rappers at Project Blowed. They successfully built a community and a network for these young, aspiring rappers.

=== Women ===
While male MCs were more prominent at Project Blowed, five female members consistently appeared in the beginning of Project Blowed. Medusa, a female MC, MCed Project Blowed for over twenty years. She was the first MC at Thursday Night and won many battles with men and women.

== Expansion ==
With the expansion of the Blowdian roster to include newer groups such as Customer Service and Swim Team, Project Blowed has since opened new additional workshops in California's Inland Empire to accompany its former primary location in Leimert Park, Los Angeles.

- Original location: Los Angeles, California (hosted by NGA FSH, Rhymin' Riddlore?, Chu Chu and J-Smoov)
- Expansion location: Inland Empire, California (hosted by Ganjah K)
- Additional locations: Las Vegas, Nevada (hosted by Phoenix Orion) and Austin, Texas (hosted by Tray Loc)

== Artists ==
- Abstract Rude
- Aceyalone
- Busdriver
- C.V.E.
- The Cloaks - AWOL One + Gel Roc
- Dibia$e
- DJ Drez
- Dumbfoundead
- Ellay Khule
- Fat Jack
- Figures of Speech
- Freestyle Fellowship
- Ganjah K
- Haiku d'Etat
- Jurassic 5
- Mister CR
- Medusa
- Meen Green
- Myka 9
- Ngafsh
- Nobody
- Nocando
- Omid
- Open Mike Eagle
- Orko Eloheim
- P.E.A.C.E.
- Pigeon John
- Psychosiz
- Ras G
- Sach
- Self Jupiter
- Subtitle
- Thavius Beck
- Vision
- 2Mex
- Volume 10

== Compilation albums ==
Project Blowed (1995)
No.	Title	Lyrics	Music	Length
1.	"Jurassick"	Aceyalone, Spoon Iodine, C.V.E.	Home Grown Beatz	3:44
2.	"Who's There?"	Self Jupiter		0:06
3.	"Strength of A.T.U."	Abstract Rude	Digiak	3:43
4.	"What a Pity"	C.V.E.	DJ Wolf	1:05
5.	"Don't Get It Twisted"	Figures of Speech	Digiak	3:14
6.	"Hot"	Freestyle Fellowship	JMD, The Underground Railroad	4:39
7.	"Once Upon a Freak"	Tray Loc	CV Shack Productionz	3:55
8.	"Beautiful Day in the Neighborhood"	Dolla Holla	J-Sumbi	3:08
9.	"Solo Is So Low"	DK Toon, B Cartoon	Fat Jack	3:44
10.	"This Evening"			0:42
11.	"Heavyweights Round 2"	P.E.A.C.E., T Love, Aceyalone, Nefertiti, Self Jupiter, BJ, Ganjah K, Medusa, Ko Ko, Myka 9, Volume 10	Mathmattiks	7:00
12.	"Funky Commercial Break"	Funky Trend	Digiak	1:33
13.	"Second Chance"			0:09
14.	"I Don't Know"	Abstract Rude, Aceyalone, Rhymin Riddlore	Fat Jack	7:59
15.	"Yeh Man"	Abstract Rude	Digiak	0:27
16.	"Narcolepsy"	C.V.E., Rifleman Ellay Khule	Cee Vee Beat Down, Hip Hop Kclan	4:04
17.	"I Think?"	Aceyalone	Aceyalone	1:20
18.	"Maskaraid Part 1 & 2"	Abstract Rude, Aceyalone	Fat Jack	8:49
19.	"Treble and Bass"	Abstract Rude, Aceyalone	Vic Hop	4:25
Total length:				63:46

Project Blowed: 10th Anniversary (2005)
No.	Title	Lyrics	Music	Length
1.	"4343 Leimert Blvd. L.A., CA 90008"			2:11
2.	"Enter the Kaos"	Aceyalone, Busdriver, Longevity, NgaFsh	Riddlore	1:52
3.	"Who the F*ck Is You?"	Aceyalone, Riddlore, Abstract Rude, Busdriver, Rifleman	PMG	4:31
4.	"Live @ the Blowed"	Customer Service	Longevity	4:00
5.	"Villains"	C.V.E.	C.V.E.	3:56
6.	"The People"	Sach, Pigeon John, Rifleman	Omid	3:19
7.	"Sound Boy Murderers"	Abstract Tribe Unique	Fat Jack	4:11
8.	"Too Underground"	Busdriver	Kenny Segal	4:40
9.	"Sounds Like"	Hip Hop Clan	Nobody	2:53
10.	"What's Your Aim?"	Acid Reign	Re.4m	3:44
11.	"Cray Crazy"	Aceyalone, Busdriver, Nocando, Subtitle	Thavius Beck	4:45
12.	"Jazzy Girl"	Myka 9, Busdriver, Xololanxinxo, Toca	Toca	1:50
13.	"Astro Pimp"	Cypher 7	JB	3:36
14.	"How You Been? (Homegirl)"	Otherwize	Jizzm High Definition	2:52
15.	"What It Do?"	Medusa, Mr. Perkins, Black Silver, Volume 10	PMG	2:29
16.	"Do Unto Others"	Aceyalone	Beat Science	4:21
17.	"13th Month"	Abstract Rude, Busdriver, Phoenix Orion	Kenny Segal	4:25
18.	"Mama & Pappa Raised Right"	Pterradacto, Aceyalone, Jah Orah, Nonstop	DJ Drez	2:52
19.	"Battle Prone"	Myka 9, Power Tung, Wreek One	Myka 9	3:27
20.	"Ruff Rhymes"	Aceyalone, Longevity	Longevity	2:42
21.	"Doing What We Love"	Jah Orah	Beat Science	5:54
Total length:				74:40

== See also ==
- List of record labels
- Underground hip-hop
