= Joey the Jerk =

American rapper

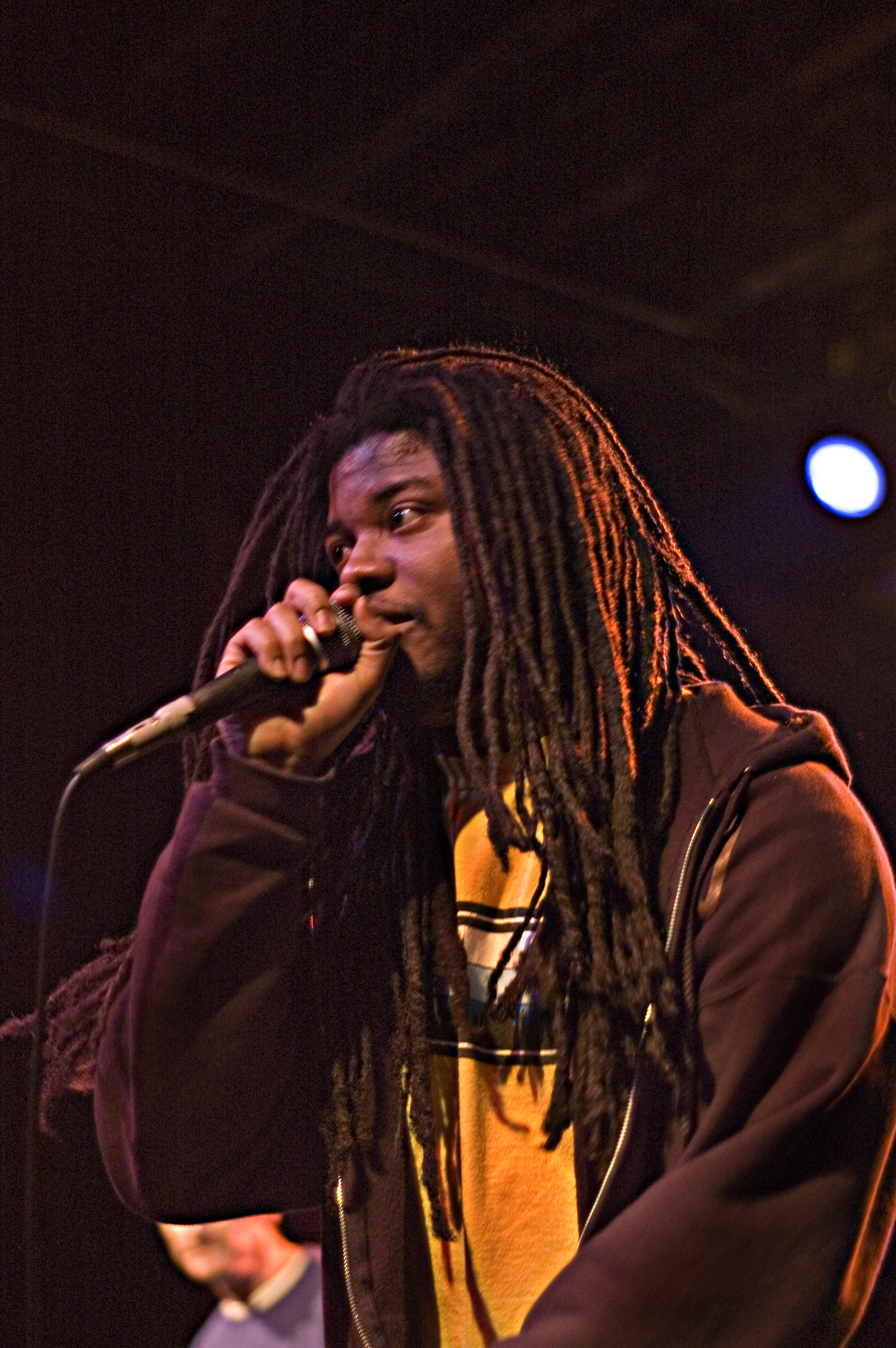
- Pictured in 2006

Background information
- Also known as: Joey Lawrence Joey L. Joey's Dream
- Born: Sarpong Siriboe Boateng; October 14, 1976 (age 49); Los Angeles, California, U.S.
- Genres: Christian hip hop, Christian pop
- Occupations: Singer, songwriter
- Instrument: Vocals
- Years active: 1997–present
- Label: Illect

Sarpong Siriboe Boateng (born October 14, 1976), also known by the stage name Joey the Jerk and formerly Joey Lawrence and Joey's Dream, is an American Christian hip hop musician. He has released two studio albums, Average Joe in 2003, and, Catch Me if You Can in 2015. He began his career as a founding member of the acclaimed Christian hip hop collective LA Symphony.

== Early life ==
Joey was born, Sarpong Siriboe Boateng, on October 14, 1976, in Los Angeles, California, the son of Kofi Sr., and Phyllis Boateng, raised in Paramount, California with an older brother, Agyeman, a younger brother, Kofi Jr., and a younger sister, Amber. His parents married on June 15, 1974, in Los Angeles, California.

== Music career ==
Joey the Jerk's music career started in 1997, with the rap collective, LA Symphony, and he was known as Joey's Dream, for part of his music career in the early 2010s. He released Average Joe, a studio album, in 2003. The second release, Mold Me, an extended play, was released by Illect Records, on August 23, 2011. His subsequent studio album, Catch Me if You Can, was released on September 25, 2015.

== Discography ==
Studio albums

- Average Joe (2003, independent)
- Catch Me if You Can (September 25, 2015, independent)

EPs

- Mold Me (August 23, 2011, Illect, as Joey's Dream)
