= Volume 10 (rapper) =

American rapper

- Origin: Los Angeles, California
- Genres: Hip hop
- Occupation: Rapper
- Years active: 1993-present
- Labels: RCA, Immortal, Warrior, Street Institute, Pump Productions

Dino Hawkins, known by his stage name Volume 10, is an American rapper from Los Angeles, California. He was a member of the Heavyweights crew along with Freestyle Fellowship, Ganjah K, and Medusa, among others.

== History ==
Volume 10 was featured on Freestyle Fellowship's 1993 album, Innercity Griots.

Volume 10's debut solo single "Pistolgrip-Pump" was released in 1993 to critical acclaim, despite being edited for radio and referred to simply as "Pump" in 1994. The single was later recorded by Rage Against the Machine for their album, Renegades.

He released his first album Hip-Hopera in 1994. The second album, Psycho, was released in 2000.

== Discography ==
=== Albums ===
- Hip-Hopera (1994)
- Psycho (2000)
- Pawn Shop (2007)
- Still in the Game (2012)
- Street Rhymes And Rhythms (2015)
- Brain Damage (2020)
- Akhenaton (2021)
- Volume 10 As Dean Hawkins (2022)

=== EPs ===
- Servin' and Dippin' (1998)

=== Singles ===
Year	Single	US R&B/ Hip-Hop	Album
1994	"Pistolgrip-Pump"	64	Hip-Hopera
1994	"Sunbeams"	—	Hip-Hopera
1997	"Servin' and Dippin'"	—	Dead Homiez^{[A]} (Movie Soundtrack)
1998	"Raised In The Hood"	91	SI Riders^{[B]} (Compilation)
2013	"Uncles's Children"	—	single only
2014	"Vogue"	—	single only

Notes

- A released later as Servin' and Dippin' EP (1998), also included on Psycho (2000)
- B included later on Psycho (2000)

=== Guest appearances ===
- Freestyle Fellowship - "Heavyweights" from Innercity Griots (1993)
- DJ Honda - "Bread + Jerry" from h (1996)
- The Whoridas - "Top Notch" from High Times (1999)
- Fat Jack - "Hooray!" from Cater to the DJ (1999)
- The A-Team - "O.G. Crew (Heavyweights Round 3)" from Who Framed the A-Team? (2000)
- Abstract Rude + Tribe Unique - "Heavyweights Round 4" from P.A.I.N.T. (2001)
- Casual - "Take It Back" from Truck Driver (2004)
- Fatlip - "Freaky Pumps" from The Loneliest Punk (2005)
- Neila - "Mercy Refused" from Better Late Than Never (2009)
- Otherwize - "Big Girls Don't Cry" from Point of View (2010)
- Self Jupiter & Kenny Segal - "Altered States" from The Kleenrz (2012)

=== Compilation appearances ===
- "Heavyweights Round 2" on Project Blowed (1995)
- "Liquor Store Run" on Rhyme & Reason (1997)
- "Raised In The Hood (with Roni Size)" on Marvel's Blade II: Bloodhunter (2002)
- "What It Do?" on Project Blowed 10th Anniversary (2005)
