= Is Dating Your Sister =

Studio album by Pigeon John
- Released: August 26, 2003
- Genre: Hip-hop
- Length: 52:56
- Label: Basement Records
- Producer: Pigeon John, DJ Rhettmatic, Great Jason, Matt Mahaffey

Pigeon John chronology
| Is Clueless (2001) | Is Dating Your Sister (2003) | Sings the Blues (2005) |

Professional ratings
Review scores
| Source | Rating |
|---|---|
| AllMusic | 4/5 stars |
| PopMatters | (mixed) |

Is Dating Your Sister is the second solo album by American rapper Pigeon John. It was released on Basement Records in 2003.

== Track listing ==
| No. | Title | Producer(s) | Length |
|---|---|---|---|
| 1. | "High School Reunion" | Pigeon John | 3:25 |
| 2. | "Life Goes On" (featuring Abstract Rude) | DJ Rhettmatic | 3:20 |
| 3. | "Identity Crisis" | Great Jason, Matt Mahaffey | 4:20 |
| 4. | "Deception" | Pigeon John | 3:35 |
| 5. | "Emily" | Pigeon John | 3:42 |
| 6. | "Fox Hills Mallmacks" | Pigeon John | 2:28 |
| 7. | "Originalz" (featuring Mikah 9) | DJ Rhettmatic | 3:55 |
| 8. | "Crazy" | Pigeon John | 3:00 |
| 9. | "Hello Everybody" | Matt Mahaffey, Pigeon John | 3:29 |
| 10. | "Orange County" | Pigeon John | 3:19 |
| 11. | "Sam the Goat" | Pigeon John | 2:14 |
| 12. | "2 Step" (featuring Murs) | Great Jason | 3:00 |
| 13. | "What Is Love?!" | Matt Mahaffey, Pigeon John | 4:47 |
| 14. | "The Art of Falling Off" | Pigeon John | 3:10 |
| 15. | "Alone" | Pigeon John | 5:12 |
