= The Promise (Freestyle Fellowship album) =

Studio album by Freestyle Fellowship
- Released: October 18, 2011
- Genre: Hip-hop
- Length: 49:12
- Label: Decon
- Producers: Omid; Eligh; Exile; Kenny Segal; Myka 9; E. Super; Bionik; JMD; Black Milk; Biz One; Josef Leimberg

Freestyle Fellowship chronology
Shockadoom (2002)	The Promise (2011)

The Promise is the fourth studio album by American hip-hop group Freestyle Fellowship. It was released on Decon in 2011.

In September 2011, Prefix premiered "Step 2 the Side". In November that year, Prefix premiered the music video for "We Are".

== Critical reception ==
Professional ratings
Review scores
Source	Rating
AllMusic	3/5 stars
Exclaim!	favorable
HipHopDX	3/5 stars
Mishka NYC	A
Potholes in My Blog	4/5 stars
Spectrum Culture	3.7/5.0

Jason Lymangrover of AllMusic gave the album 3 stars out of 5, saying, "futuristic beats by Black Milk, Eligh, Kenny Segal, and Exile provide an updated setting for the dexterous wordplay." Luke Gibson of HipHopDX said, "The end result of The Promise sees a legendary group that can still deliver inspired music." Scott Thill of Wired described it as "a healthy reminder of what hip-hop can do when its rhyme machines boast big brains as well as balls."

== Track listing ==
No.	Title	Producer(s)	Length
1.	"Introduction"	Omid	1:52
2.	"We Are"	Eligh	2:43
3.	"This Write Here"	Omid	3:32
4.	"Step 2 the Side"	Exile	3:30
5.	"Ambassadors"	Kenny Segal	3:57
6.	"Dart"	Myka 9	4:24
7.	"Gimmee"	Kenny Segal	4:12
8.	"Government Lies"	E. Super	2:38
9.	"Introspective"	Bionik	3:58
10.	"Daddies"	JMD	4:43
11.	"Candy"	Black Milk	4:03
12.	"Know the Truth"	Myka 9	1:16
13.	"Popular"	Biz One	3:35
14.	"Promise"	Josef Leimberg	4:59
Total length:			49:12
