= Dibiase (music producer) =

American musician

- Also known as: Dibia$e, Mr. Dibiase, Diabolic, Green Llama
- Origin: Watts, Los Angeles, California, United States
- Genre: Alternative hip-hop
- Occupation: Producer
- Instruments: SP-303 and SP-404 Samplers; Keyboards
- Years active: 2007–present
- Labels: Alpha Pup Records; 10 Thirty Records; Fat Beats Records
- Website: www.mrdibiase.com

Donell McGary (born October 30, 1976) known professionally as Dibiase, is an American alternative hip-hop producer from Watts, Los Angeles, California. He is also a member of Project Blowed hip-hop shop.

== Career ==
Dibiase released his debut album, Machines Hate Me, on Alpha Pup Records in 2010. Pitchfork gave it 5.8 out of 10, while Resident Advisor gave it 4 out of 5. Before doing music, he made a living as a graphic artist. Unlike most hip-hop producers who use the Akai MPC and SP-1200, he primarily utilizes the SP-303 and SP-404 installments, for they provide a gritty lo-fi sound.

== Discography ==
=== Albums ===
- Machines Hate Me (2010)
- Sound Palace (2011)
- Looney Goons (2012)
- Schematiks (2013)
- Baker's Dozen: DIBIA$E (2016)
- Bonus Levels (2019)

=== EPs ===
- Up the Joystick (2007)
- Los Angeles 1/10 (2010) with P.U.D.G.E.
- Comfort Zone (2011)
- Swingology 101 (2011)
- 2Dirt4TV (2012) with Quelle Chris
- Collectin' Dust (2012)
- Throwbacks (2012)
- Llamaville (2012)
- 10K (2013)
- Progressions (2013)
- Up the Joystick 2 (Hidden Levels) (2014)
- Excuse the Tape Hiss (2014)

=== Singles ===
- "Hue-Man Nature of the Beast" b/w "My Lady" (2009) with Droop-Capone
- "May the Force" (2009)
- "Fly Me t' the Moon" (2011) with Versis

=== Productions ===
- Intuition & Verbs – "Really" from Buzz (2009)
- Remarkable Mayor – "Floating", "Contradictions" and "Boogie Bounce" from The Campaign (2009)
- Exile – "Population Control (Dibiase Remix)" from Radio Bonus (2010)
- Dark House Family – "Mein Atari (Dibiase Lofi Reflip)" from Family Trees (2010)
- Take – "Neon Beams (Dibiase Remix)" from Only Mountain: The Remixes (2011)
- T. Calmese – "Out My Mind" from A Will of Fortune (2011)
- Flash Bang Grenada – "Good Cop, Bad Cop" from 10 Haters (2011)
- Blu – "Slngbngrs" from York (2011)
- Joe Styles – "Love, Peace, Happiness, and Rhythm", "Give You All My Heart", "I See You" and "Tel-Lie-Vision" from Elevation Music (2012)
- 2Mex & Maiselph – "All Comes Down" from Like Farther... Like Sun... (2013)
- Clear Soul Forces – "We Be Runnin' This" from Gold PP7s (2013)
- Open Mike Eagle – "Jon Lovitz (Fantasy Booking Yarn)" from Dark Comedy (2014)
- Jonwayne – "These Words Are Everything" from Rap Album Two (2017)
