= LA Symphony =

American hip-hop group

L.A. Symphony
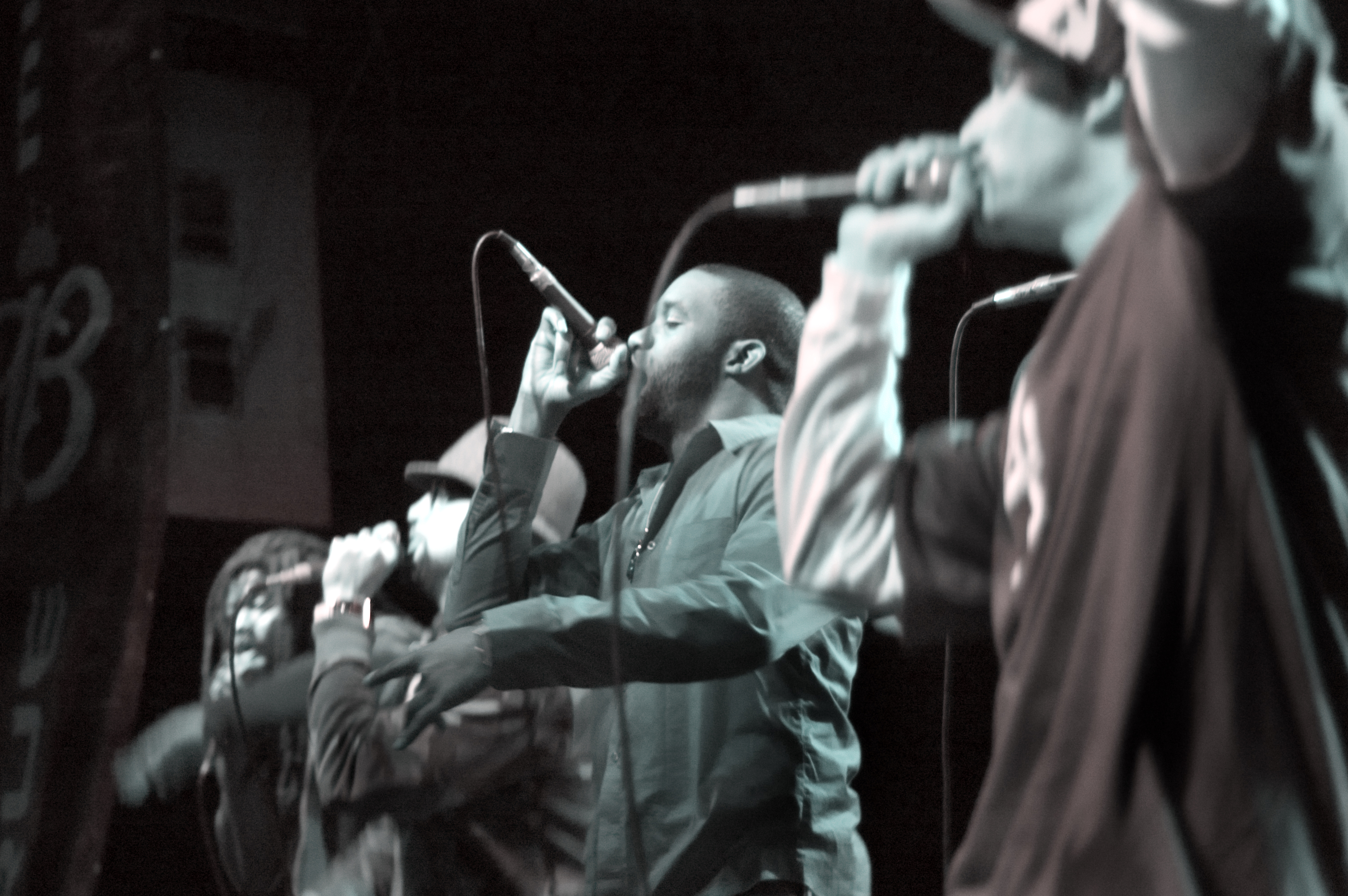

Background information
- Origin: Los Angeles, California, US
- Genres: Alternative hip-hop, Christian hip-hop
- Years active: 1997–2009, 2012–present
- Labels: Eartube Empire, Squint, Basement, Gotee, Syntax
- Members: CookBook; Flynn Adam; Sareem Poems; UNO Mas; Joey the Jerk; Pigeon John; bTwice; J-Beits (Great Jason)
- Past members: Coy; J-BoogiE; Trendi MC
- Website: www.lasymphonymusic.com

L.A. Symphony is an independent alternative hip-hop group from Los Angeles, California. Current members of L.A. Symphony are FLYNN (also known as Flynn Adam), UNO Mas, CookBook, Joey the Jerk (formerly Joey's Dream), Sareem Poems (fka Sharlock Poems), Pigeon John and bTwice (collectively known as Brainwash Projects), and J-Beits a.k.a. Great Jason. Past members include Trendi MC (who compose Halieyoos Fishermen with Sharlok Poems and J-Beits), Coy (Paul "Coy" Allen), Xpress, Gaja and Beond of Acid Reign.

== History ==
Formed in 1997, the band released their first album, 1999's Composition No. 1 on independent record label Eartube Empire. They then recorded an album entitled Call It What You Want between 1999 and 2001 for Squint Entertainment. It contained tracks produced by the band and by Mario C, will.i.am and Prince Paul. It was slated to be released in April 2001 and was sold as a bootleg copy at live shows and online until unofficially released as CIWYW, in addition to a release a promotional EP titled Big Broke L.A. that contained tracks from Call It What You Want. The lead single was "Broken Tape Decks" and was released as a limited edition 12" vinyl and CD single, with B-Side "What You Say?!?". The album was never released due to issues with the label.

LA Symphony independently released the Baloney EP in 2002. Originally, 1000 limited edition copies were pressed, hand-numbered and shipped in resealable sandwich bags. Baloney was later re-pressed.

Following the Baloney EP, L.A. Symphony was signed to Gotee Records. They then released The End Is Now in 2003, Less Than Zero in 2005 and Disappear Here in 2005. 2005 was also a year of personal tragedies for the band. CCM reported that immediately after re-signing to Gotee, three members experienced personal traumas—UNO came down with Guillain–Barré syndrome, CookBook's father suffered from a stroke, and Joey's grandfather also died.

In 2007, the group released a mixtape, Unleashed. Guests on the album include Posdnuos and Awol One.

In 2009, the members decided to put the group on hiatus. Since then several members have continued with solo projects.

On December 19, 2011, rumors started circulating (via bTwice's Twitter account) about a reunion of the group. The group would likely welcome back former members bTwice, Pigeon John, J-Beits (aka Great Jason), and J-BoogiE. On February 15, 2012 it was announced by bTwice via Twitter that the group would play the 2012 Paid Dues festival. It was also said that former members Pigeon John, J-Beits (Great Jason), and bTwice will return to the group for this show.

In December 2014, released their first record together with all 8 members since 2003 in honor of their 15th anniversary called You Still on Earth!?!.

In August 2025, they released a single titled BRK SMTHN.

== Discography ==
Year	Title	Label(s)
1999	Composition No. 1	Eartube Empire
2001	Big Broke L.A. (Promo EP)	Squint Entertainment
2002	Baloney (EP)	Independent
2003	The End Is Now	Gotee Records
2005	Call It What You Want	Squint Entertainment
2005	Less Than Zero	Gotee Records
2005	Disappear Here	Gotee Records
2007	Unleashed	Syntax Records
2014	You Still on Earth?	L.A. Symphony Music
2025	BRK SMTHN	The Telephone Company
