= And the Summertime Pool Party =

Studio album by Pigeon John
- Released: September 12, 2006
- Genre: Hip-hop
- Length: 45:36
- Label: Quannum Projects
- Producer: Buchman; Chris James; DJ Rhettmatic; DNAE Beats; Great Jason; Nick Toth; Pigeon John; RJD2

Pigeon John chronology
Sings the Blues (2003)	And the Summertime Pool Party (2006)	Dragon Slayer (2010)

Professional ratings
Review scores
Source	Rating
AllHipHop	3.5/5 stars
AllMusic	3.5/5 stars
HipHopDX	3.5/5
PopMatters	7/10
RapReviews	8/10
Spin	3.5/5 stars
The A.V. Club	A

And the Summertime Pool Party is the fourth solo studio album by American rapper Pigeon John. It was released on September 12, 2006 via Quannum Projects. Production was handled by Chris James, DNAE Beats, Great Jason, Buchman, DJ Rhettmatic, Nick Toth, RJD2, and Pigeon John himself. It features guest appearances from Brother Ali, J-Live, DJ Rhettmatic and RJD2.

== Track listing ==
No.	Title	Producer(s)	Length
1.	"Welcome to the Show"	DNAE Beats	3:14
2.	"Scene 1: I Thought You Was a G?"		0:36
3.	"Do the Pigeon"	Great Jason	3:41
4.	"Higher?!"	Pigeon John	3:26
5.	"Scene 2: I Was Just Looking at Her Jeans"		0:45
6.	"Money Back Guarantee"	Pigeon John	3:56
7.	"Freaks! Freaks!" (featuring DJ Rhettmatic)	DJ Rhettmatic	3:32
8.	"One for The..." (featuring Brother Ali)	Pigeon John	3:56
9.	"The Last Sunshine" (featuring RJD2 and J-Live)	RJD2	4:02
10.	"Weight of the World"	Buchman; Nick Toth	3:38
11.	"Scene 3: Black Man on a White Horse"		0:24
12.	"As We Know It"	Great Jason	3:51
13.	"I Lost My Job Again"	DNAE Beats	4:05
14.	"Scene 4: The Girls, The Fantastic Fireworks"		0:27
15.	"Brand New Day"	Chris James	3:13
16.	"Growin' Old"	Chris James	2:50
Total length:			45:36
