= Red Cloud (rapper) =

American rapper

RedCloud
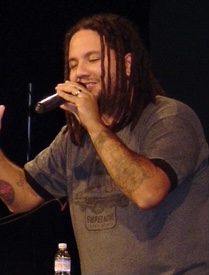
- RedCloud performing in 2004

Background information
- Also known as: RedCloud
- Born: Henry Andrade; November 18, 1978 (age 47); Hawthorne, California, U.S.
- Genre: Underground hip hop
- Occupations: Rapper, singer, songwriter
- Instrument: Vocals
- Years active: 2000–present
- Labels: Syntax, 1491 Nation
- Website: teamlightningcloud.com

Henry Andrade (born November 18, 1978), known professionally as RedCloud, is an American rapper who creates hip-hop tracks recognizably influenced by his spiritual and Indigenous heritage.

== Early life ==
Henry Andrade was born on November 18, 1978 in Hawthorne, California. He is of Indigenous Mexican heritage (Wixáritari). In 1991, while in the eighth grade, Andrade embraced the Christian faith and identified as a "born again" believer in Jesus Christ, subsequently renouncing his involvement in gang activities.

== Music career ==
Transitioning from involvement in gangs to pursuing a career in hip hop and gospel music in the early 1990s, RedCloud signed with Syntax Records in 2000. He then recorded his debut studio album, Is This Thing On?, which was released in April 2001. The album received positive reviews from critics, with AllMusic's Jo-Ann Greene and Jesus Freak Hideout's Scott Fryberger both awarding it four and a half stars out of five. However, Brian A. Smith of The Phantom Tollbooth rated it three clocks out of five.

His second album, Traveling Circus, was released on December 16, 2003, under the Syntax label. The album garnered positive reviews, with Jesus Freak Hideout's Scott Fryberger awarding it a five-star rating. Additionally, Jo-Ann Greene from AllMusic gave it a four-star rating. Cross Rhythms' Tony Cummings gave the album a rating of 9 out of 10, while Rapzilla rated it three and a half R's. Tony LaFlanza, writing for The Phantom Tollbooth, rated the album a four out of five clock release.

His third studio album with Syntax Records, titled Hawthorne's Most Wanted, was released on May 22, 2007. Scott Fryberger gave the album a rating of four stars, while Jo-Ann Greene rated it four and a half stars. Wayne Gough, reviewing for Cross Rhythms, gave the album a rating of nine out of ten. Bert Saraco of The Phantom Tollbooth rated it four clocks. In 2006, RedCloud released a mixtape titled The Warriors Society, once again under the Syntax Records label. During his decade-long tenure with the label, RedCloud sold over 50,000 units of his releases. He toured alongside artists such as KRS-One, Immortal Technique, Evidence, Tech N9ne, and Murs, among others.

Following his departure from Syntax Records in 2010, he established the independent 1491 Nations record label and released his underground mixtape titled 1491 Nation Presents: MC RedCloud in 2011. The subsequent year, RedCloud, with the collaboration of Crystle Lightning and DJ Hydroe, evolved his music style, forming a performance crew named LightningCloud. Recognized for its electro-house/hip hop fusion featuring RedCloud's distinctive underground rap style, LightningCloud received acclaim. Sam Slovik of the L.A. Weekly described the crew as "a near-earth object inventing new realms of the Electro-House-Hip-Hop revolution on the planet. Urban futurist[s], MC RedCloud and Crystle Lightning are L.A.’s subterranean Bonnie and Clyde." Their self-titled debut album, released in 2012, offers an eclectic blend of musical styles, including straight hip hop ("Burn It Down"), electro house dance grooves ("Zoom," "Gravitron"), hip hop-infused French yé-yé ("Hang It Up Daddy"), and a touch of B-movie slasher flick tango ("Zombie Love"). He tours across North America as a performance artist and is recognized for songs that encompass a global perspective in geography, message, and experience. His collaborative LightningCloud album, released in 2012, features contributions from established collaborators such as Pigeon John, DJ Wise, and producer Greg "DJ Ei8ht" Leonti. The LightningCloud album garnered acclaim and received recognition from the Aboriginal Peoples Choice Music Awards (APCMA) for Best Hip Hop Album in November 2012.

In 2013, RedCloud participated in MC battles throughout Southern California and emerged victorious in the "Who’s Next: Battle for the Best" contest hosted by Power 106, the leading hip-hop station in the United States. Following their victory, the LightningCloud crew was awarded a cash prize and had the opportunity to perform alongside Kendrick Lamar. They also represented West Coast hip hop in a freestyle battle against Hot 97's Brooklyn-based east coast representative, Radamiz in Austin, Texas, on March 15, 2013. Following their success in the MC battle, LightningCloud had the opportunity to use a beat produced by Timbaland for a subsequent track titled "Sake Bombs."

RedCloud's lyrical content aligns with Native American hip hop, a genre that resonates with Indigenous peoples in both the United States and Canada. In line with other MCs, past and present, such as Litefoot, RezOfficial, Joey Stylez, and War Party, among others, RedCloud addresses Native issues, politics, and social awareness through his rap. He incorporates traditional Native music elements into contemporary hip hop style and conducts workshops and performances aimed at raising the Indigenous consciousness among Tribal youth.

In 2014, RedCloud set a new Guinness World Record for the longest freestyle rap, surpassing the previous record of 17 hours. He achieved this milestone with a duration of 18 hours, 1 minute, and 14 seconds.

== Discography ==
Studio albums

- Is This Thing On? (April 3, 2001, Syntax Records)
- Traveling Circus (December 6, 2003, Syntax Records)
- Hawthorne's Most Wanted (May 22, 2007, Syntax Records)
- 1491 Nation Presents: MC RedCloud (July 22, 2011, 1491 Nations Records)
- LightningCloud (June 30, 2012, 1491 Nation Records)
