= Mars Ill =

- Origin: Atlanta, Georgia, U.S.
- Genres: Underground hip-hop, Christian hip-hop
- Years active: 1998–present
- Labels: Gotee, Uprok, Deepspace5

Mars Ill is an emcee/DJ hip-hop duo from Atlanta, Georgia. The duo consists of Gregory Owens (Manchild) and Nathan Corrona (DJ Dust). They are also part of the hip-hop collective and supergroup Deepspace5.

Coming together in 1998, Mars Ill has released several albums and EPs through independent record labels and two albums on Gotee Records. Their success in the underground hip-hop movement in the early 2000s led to their performing at Scribble Jam in 2003 and 2004 and, ultimately, their signing to Gotee.

== History ==
=== Beginnings ===
Before Nate and Greg met, Nate was the DJ for deadpoetsociety, a hip-hop group based in Indianapolis. The group consisted of three members, Nate Corrona (DJ Dust), Michael Porter (Rahlo), and Joel Wilson (Thin King), and performed at various venues in and around Indianapolis and the Mid-West from 1995 to 1999. In 1998, Nate attended a hip-hop conference in Florida and met Greg Owens, who was at the time an MC for The Pride, living in Atlanta. Greg was asked to be a part of deadpoetsociety and subsequently toured with the group until around the end of 1999. At that point, Joel had left the group to return to his home in England, and the three current members decided to change the group name because, as Greg mentioned in an interview, "there [are] a lot of Dead Poets Society's around.". Nate then decided to move to Atlanta, feeling that the group would have better opportunities in that city, musically and ministry-wise. Michael stayed in Indianapolis and soon afterward began his own group, The BlackSoil Project.

=== Origins of group name ===
The name "Mars Ill" is a shortened version of Mars Hill, mentioned in Acts in the Bible, (Acts 17:19). "ILL" is capitalized for clarity, as it is often mistaken for the Roman number 3, or "III".

=== Raw Material ===
The group's first album was called Raw Material, released on Sphere of Hip Hop Records, in early 2000. It was considered a success in the underground hip-hop movement, garnering rave reviews from both secular and Christian critics alike. In 2002, Uprok Records (a child label of Tooth & Nail Records) offered to re-release the album. With this release, a few track changes were made: "Under the Sun" and "The End" from the Sphere of Hip Hop release were replaced with "Sphere of Hip Hop (original)", "Fade to Black", and "The Abolition of Manchild".

=== ProPain delays ===
Following the 2003 release of Backbreakanomics, Dust and Manchild worked on a new album, titled ProPain, with a 2004 release date. As excitement built for the new album, EMI executives got involved in the project, which they planned to release as a major Gotee Records release. However, on review, they discovered that certain tracks had uncleared samples, and they put the project on hold until further notice. As Dust worked to clear the samples on some tracks and modify others, the release date was continually pushed back. To ease fans' disappointment and frustration, the group released Pirate Radio, showing their resilience through this trial. ProPain's legal issues continued, however, and anticipation mounted through a premature release and recall, and several re-releases of previous albums. The waiting paid off in May 2006 when the CD finally came out shy a few tracks of the original, but with new songs to complete the project. Lead singles included "More" featuring Ahmad of 4th Avenue Jones and Anthony David, and the revolution-minded "Sound Off".

== Discography ==
=== Albums ===
- Raw Material (Sphere of Hip Hop Records, 2000)
- The Blue Collar Sessions (EP, Ill Boogie Records 2002)
- Sound Methods (2002)
- Backbreakanomics (Gotee Records, 2003)
- Sound Methods 2.0 (re-release, 2004)
- ProPain (Gotee Records, 2004)
- Pirate Radio (2004)
- The Blue Collar Sessions (EP, re-released 2005)
- Pirate Radio +Plus (2005) (instrumentals from Pirate Radio)
- Backbreaks (2005) (instrumentals from Backbreakanomics)
- Backwaterprophets (2005) (remix album of Backbreakanomics)
- Pro*Pain (Gotee Records, 2006)
- ProPain (Instrumentals) (Gotee Records, 2006)
- Raw Material – 5 Year Anniversary Edition (2006) (instrumentals from Raw Material)
- Old Ironsides (2006)
- Slow Flame (2007) (remix album of Pro*Pain)
- Black Listed Sessions (2008) (remix album of Blue Collar Sessions)

=== Singles ===
- "Mona Lisa" (2001)
- "Redefine" (2002)
- "Breathe Slow" (2003)
- "Pro Pain" (2005)
- "Win When" (2020)

=== DVD ===
- Mars Ill (2006)

=== DJ Dust albums ===
- No Fame (2006)
- Dust Collecting Volume One (2007) (instrumentals from Mars Ill, Deepspace5, and Sintax.the.Terrific)
- Back to Dust (2008) Collaboration with Sev Statik of Deepspace5

=== Compilation contributions ===
- Full Plates: Mixtape Vol. 2 (Gotee, 2001)
- BK & Associates (Uprok, 2002)
- Open Mic Volume 2: Live at Crossover (2002)
- It's Time (2003)
- Hip Hope 2004 (2003)
- Phatmass: Massmatics (2003)
- Uprok Mixtape Vol. 2 (Uprok, 2003)
- Fashion Expo - Round One: Tru Hip-Hop (Syntax, 2004)
- Hip Hope 2005 (2004)
- Hip Hope 2006 (2005)
- Hip Hope 2007 (2006)
- The Genesis Project (2006)
- Heavy Rotation (HipHop Is Music, 2006)
- Sphere of Hip Hop Vinyl Mix Vol 1 (2006)
- To the Ends of the Earth Volume 1 (re-release) (End of Earth, 2007)
- Hip Hope 2008 (2007)
