= Freestyle Fellowship =

American hip-hop band

- Origin: Los Angeles, California, U.S.
- Genre: Hip-hop
- Years active: 1991–1993; 1998–present
- Labels: Project Blowed; Decon; 4th & B'way; Island; Sun Music; Beats & Rhymes; Ground Control; Whig Music
- Members: Aceyalone; Myka 9; Self Jupiter
- Past members: J. Sumbi; M.D. Himself; P.E.A.C.E.

Freestyle Fellowship is an American hip-hop group from Los Angeles, California. It consists of Aceyalone, Myka 9, and Self Jupiter. The group was a prominent part of the Good Life Cafe collective and are part of the Project Blowed collective.

== History ==
While in high school in the late 1980s, Aceyalone, Myka 9, and Self Jupiter formed the short-lived MC Aces, a precursor to Freestyle Fellowship, at the Good Life Cafe in Los Angeles, California. Subsequently, former high school friend P.E.A.C.E. was added to form Freestyle Fellowship.

Freestyle Fellowship released the debut studio album, To Whom It May Concern..., in 1991. In 1993, the group released the second studio album, Innercity Griots.

Freestyle Fellowship went on hiatus due to the incarceration of Self Jupiter. In 1998, the group reunited to record the Shockadoom EP, which would be released in 2002. The group released Temptations in 2001, and The Promise in 2011.

== Style and influences ==
"My Fantasy"
Trained in the art of freestyling, members of the group deliver complex, intricate rhymes atop bebop-influenced beats. The track "My Fantasy" showcases Aceyalone's rapid delivery, twisting rhymes, and stream-of-consciousness lyrics.

According to Los Angeles Times, Freestyle Fellowship incorporates "jazz rhythms into its raps, which have the improvisational ebb and flow and the random explosiveness of a jazz solo." In a 1993 interview with Los Angeles Times, the group's member Myka 9 said, "What we are is liberators, liberating rap from its R&B/funk structures—that 4/4 (time) prison."

The group has been described by LA Weekly as "the astral jazz-cracked geniuses of sherm-strafed South Central, rapping with caged bird cadences about sleeping on park benches, biblical books, and gangsta rap carpetbaggers."

== Discography ==
=== Studio albums ===
- To Whom It May Concern... (1991)
- Innercity Griots (1993)
- Temptations (2001)
- The Promise (2011)

=== Remix albums ===
- Version 2.0: To Whom It May Concern... Remixed by J. Sumbi (2001)

=== Mixtapes ===
- Power Plant (2011)

=== EPs ===
- Shockadoom (2002)

=== Singles ===
- "Bullies of the Block" (1992)
- "Hot Potato" (1993)
- "Can You Find the Level of Difficulty in This?" (1999)
- "Sex in the City" (2001)
- "Temptations" b/w "Ghetto Youth" (2002)

=== Guest appearances ===
- Nobody - "Planets Ain't Aligned" from Soulmates (2000)
- Abstract Rude & Tribe Unique - "Heavyweights Round 4" from P.A.I.N.T. (2001)

=== Compilation appearances ===
- "Hot" from Project Blowed (1994)
- "Can You Find the Level of Difficulty in This? (Hive Remix)" from Defcon 4 (2000)
- "Ummm" from We Came from Beyond (2001)
- "Crazy" from Constant Elevation (2002)
