= The Nonce =

American hip hop group

- Origin: Los Angeles, California, U.S.
- Genre: Hip hop
- Years active: 1990–1999
- Label: Wild West/American/Warner Bros./Fluid
- Members: Nouka Basetype; Yusef Afloat (deceased)

The Nonce was a hip-hop duo from Los Angeles, California, that was active in the 1990s, releasing material from 1992 to 1999. As part of the Project Blowed collective, working with Aceyalone, among others, the duo developed a reputation for smooth, jazzy, classy production, complemented by laid-back, smart rhymes, paying homage to the old school emcees they grew up listening to in the mid-1980s.

"For the nonce" is an archaic phrase meaning "for now" or "for the moment."

== History ==
=== 1990–1995 ===
In 1990, after their high school graduation, The Nonce began recording its first album. This album would, however, go unreleased, due to creative differences with their production company, until the master recordings were rediscovered in 2017. The following year, the album was finally released, appropriately titled 1990.

In 1992, the duo signed with Wild West Records and released their first single, "The Picnic Song". However, it would be nearly two more years, because of internal wrangling with the label, before the duo would release their biggest single to date, "Mixtapes", in 1994.

In 1995 a full-length album, World Ultimate, was released on Rick Rubin's American Recordings label (via Wild West Records). In 2005, to commemorate the album's 10-year anniversary, a Japanese reissue surfaced in limited quantities. There were also plans to reissue the album on vinyl, though as of 2008, no official reissue had surfaced.

=== The Sight of Things and previously unreleased material ===
After World Ultimate came an EP, The Sight of Things, in 1998. In 2005, previously unreleased material from the Nonce was issued in the form of two compilations: Advanced Regression and The Right State of Mind.

=== Sach solo material ===
Nouka Basetype, now known as Sach, began to release solo material in 1998 with the cassette-only album Seven Days To Engineer. He followed that up in 2002 with the Mary Joy released LP, Suckas Hate Me. 2005 saw the release of his third solo album, Sach 5th Ave. In 2018, Sach published a book of poems and paintings entitled Rhyme Book Bibliomancy. He also produced tracks for numerous Los Angeles underground hip hop artists such as Global Phlowtations, Ganjah K, Medusa, Figures of Speech, Studious Steve, and Freestyle Fellowship.

=== Death of Yusef ===
On May 21, 2000, Yusef "Afloat" Muhammad was found dead of unknown causes on the side of Freeway 110 in Los Angeles. He was 28 years old.

== Discography ==
=== Albums ===
- World Ultimate (1995)
- World Ultimate (new edition) (2005)
- 1990 (2018) (album recorded in 1990)

=== EPs ===
- The Sight of Things (1998) Wild West Records/Fluid Recordings

=== Singles ===
- The Picnic Song (1992) Wild West/American Recordings/Warner Bros. Records
- Mix Tapes (Promo) (1993) Wild West/American Recordings/Warner Bros. Records
- Mix Tapes / Keep it On (1994) Wild West/American Recordings/Warner Bros. Records
- Mix Tapes (The Remixes) (1994) Wild West/American Recordings/Warner Bros. Records
- From the Ground Up (1994) Wild West/American Recordings/Warner Bros. Records
- Bus Stops (Where the Honeys is At...) (1995) Wild West/American Recordings/Warner Bros. Records
- Live & Direct/ADR Most Requested (1997) Wild West/American Recordings/Warner Bros. Records
- Turnin' it Out (1999) Wild West/American Recordings/Warner Bros. Records
- Haiku Busho Sach San/The Only (2006) Fluid Records

=== Compilations ===
- Advanced Regression (2005)
- The Right State of Mind (2005)
- Advanced State of Regression (2006)
- The Only Mixtape – Mixed By Bachir (2010)
