= Flynn Adam =

American rapper

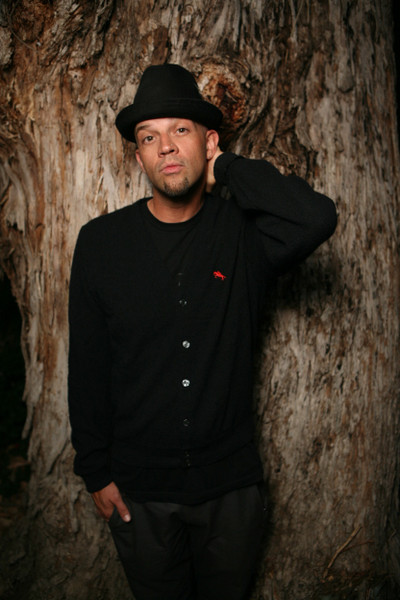

Background information
- Also known as: Flynn, FLYNN, Flynn Adam
- Born: Flynn Adam Atkins; August 3, 1973 (age 53)
- Origin: Los Angeles, California, U.S
- Genres: Hip hop; alternative rock; electronic
- Occupations: Singer, songwriter, rapper, producer
- Instruments: Ensoniq ASR-10, Korg MS2000, vocals
- Years active: 1996–present
- Labels: Eartube Empire; Illect; Gotee Records; Flynn Adam
- Member of: LA Symphony

Flynn Adam Atkins (born August 3, 1973) is an American producer, singer, and rapper. He is currently independent and has released Do What It Gonna Do on his label Aviation Recordings. Flynn Adam has also been featured numerous times on RadioU and TVU for his music video, "Such a Time", and is an active member of the hip hop music duo Rootbeer with fellow LA Symphony member Pigeon John. Rootbeer has recently released an EP on July 31, 2026 titled "Beach Towel". Flynn is also a member of famed Hip Hop crew LA Symphony. He has also collaborated with fellow L.A. Symphony member Sareem Poems aka FlySolo on a project called The Perfect Nobodies and they released the debut E.P. "Get ILL" in February 2026. Flynn Adam is also working with another fellow L.A. Symphony member Cookbook on an upcoming project called CryptoBoat set to release later in 2026.

== Albums and EPs ==
In 1996, Flynn Adam created Eartube Empire to release his first EP titled Memoirs under the name Flynn Adam Atkins.

After releasing Memoirs, Flynn Adam Atkins released his first full-length studio album titled Louder in 1997. It was re-released in 2003.

In 2000, Flynn Adam Atkins went under the name, "Flynn" and released the album Burnt Out on the Microcker label. The album cover was designed like a giant matchbook.

In 2004, Flynn signed to ILLECT Recordings and released the experimental hip hop album, In Like Flynn.

After five years of near inactivity with his solo work mainly due to time involved with LA Symphony, Flynn came back as Flynn Adam and released three digital EPs within the same year, which included three music videos, along with one hard copy album which included a compilation of the three EPs. In January, Flynn Adam released the digital EP, Such a Time, including the title track and matching music video which became almost instant hits on RadioU and TVU. Within just more than two months, Flynn Adam released another digital-only EP titled Dishes and another titled Adios. In May 2009, a hard compilation of the three EPs was released called 500,000 Boomin' Watts and was available only from the Gotee Records online store or from Flynn Adams official store. In 2013, Flynn Released the album "Do or Die" and in 2019 he released the album "Do What It Gonna Do".

=== Discography ===
==== Albums ====
| Released | Title | Label(s) |
|---|---|---|
| 1997 | Louder | Eartube Empire |
| 2000 | BurntOut | Eartube Empire |
| May 4, 2004 | In Like Flynn | ILLECT Recordings |
| July 2009 | 500,000 Boomin’ Watts | Gotee |
| January 2013 | Do or Die | Eartube Empire |
| February 2019 | Do What It Gonna Do | Eartube Empire - Aviation Recordings |

==== EPs ====
| Released | Title | Label(s) |
|---|---|---|
| 1996 | Memoirs | Eartube Empire |
| January 27, 2009 | Such a Time | Gotee Records |
| March 31, 2009 | Dishes | Gotee Records |
| May 26, 2009 | Adios | Gotee Records |
| May 26, 2009 | 500,000 Boomin' Watts | Gotee Records |
| May 25, 2010 | Bang the Drums | Eartube Empire - Aviation Recordings |
