= Pigeon John =

American rapper

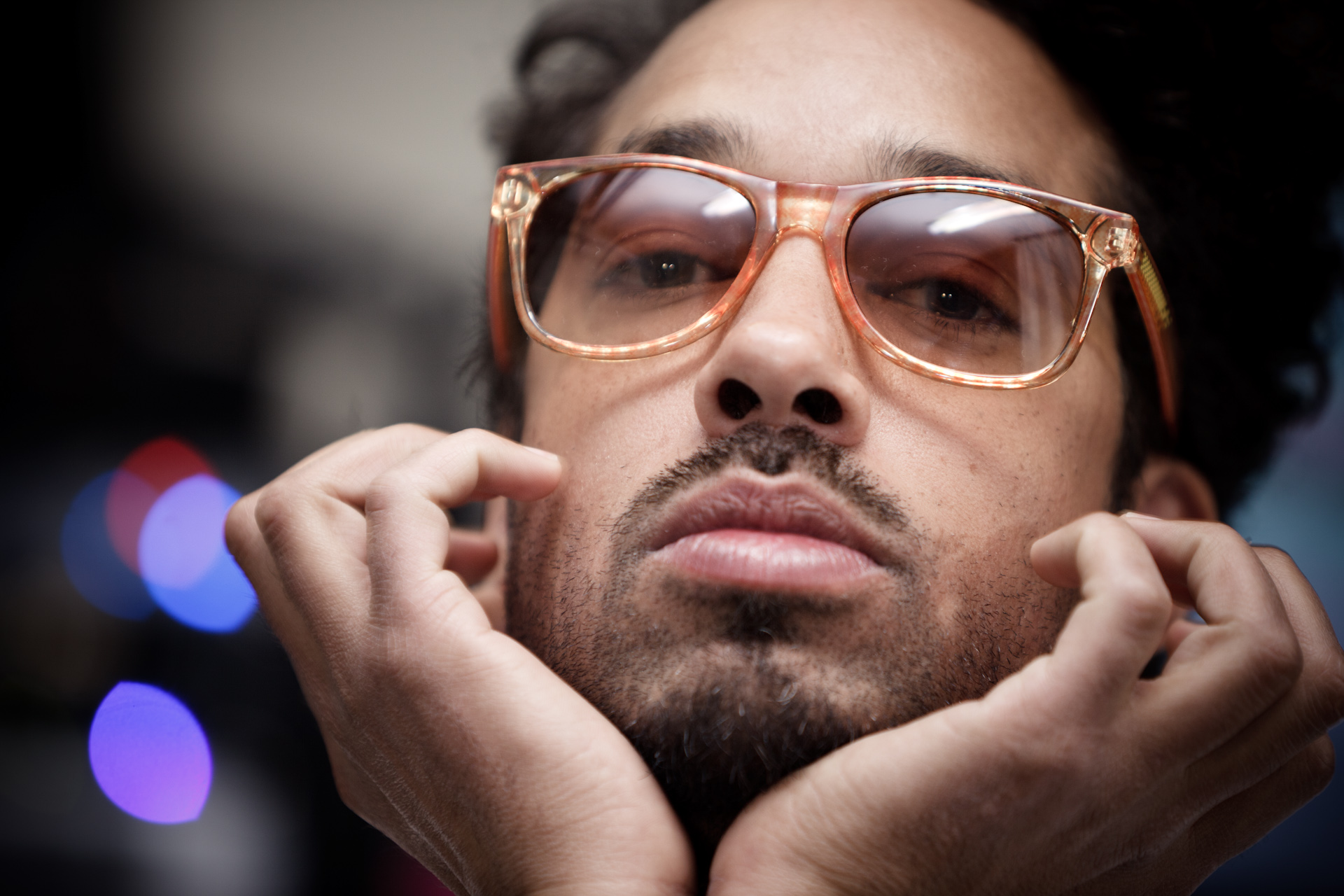

Background information
- Also known as: MC Pigeon
- Born: John Kenneth Dunkin; November 30, 1972 (age 53); Omaha, Nebraska, U.S.
- Origin: Los Angeles, California
- Genre: Underground hip-hop
- Occupations: Singer, Rapper
- Years active: 1992–present
- Labels: Syntax, Basement, Discograph, Quannum Projects

John Kenneth Dust (born John Kenneth Dunkin: November 30, 1972), better known by the stage name Pigeon John, is an American rapper based in Los Angeles, California. He is a former member of L.A. Symphony.

== Early life ==
Pigeon John claims that his stage name was provided by Jesus who was driving around Inglewood: "He hopped out and handed me a dead pigeon. He whispered, 'Please have a good time, you're really bumming me out.' I watched him sink back into the cushioned seats and drive, quickly away. And that's when it happened, the pigeon started shaking violently and became awake, picked up and flew away. I don't think I had a choice... it was 'pigeon' or die." He later explained that he was discussing his need for a stage name with a friend when the friend suggested "Chicken John", taken from the character Chicken George in Roots. The friend's mother then interjected that John didn't look like a chicken, claiming that he looked like a pigeon and should therefore be called "Pigeon John".

== Career ==
In the early 1990s, Pigeon John and his childhood friend B-Twice formed the hip-hop duo Brainwash Projects. Brainwash Projects contributed the single "Muchas Muchachas" to the Christian rap compilation "Sanktifunctafyd" released by N-Soul Records in 1995. Brainwash Projects eventually released a record titled The Rise and Fall of Brainwash Projects on the independent label Jackson Rubio. One reviewer characterized The Rise and Fall as "pure, uncut, holy hip-hop" but gave mixed reviews of its beats and lyrics.

Between 1997 and 2000, Pigeon John recorded the songs that became his first solo album, Is Clueless. The album was released in 2001 by The Telephone Company and then re-released in 2002 by The Telephone Company/Syntax Records with three new tracks and new artwork. Pigeon John then signed to Basement Records and released Is Dating Your Sister (2003) and Pigeon John Sings the Blues (2005). In 2005, Lyrics Born saw Pigeon John on the Cali Comm Tour and brought him into Quannum Projects. That same year, Pigeon John's single "Deception" was featured on a series of Nestle Crunch commercials. In 2006, after signing to Quannum, Pigeon John released his fourth solo album, And the Summertime Pool Party. The album has received positive reviews from many sources, including LA Weekly, Entertainment Weekly, and Vibe.

A new album, entitled Dragon Slayer, hit physical and digital retail October 12, 2010. With the aid of General Elektriks' Herve Salters, he produced the whole record, including, for the first time, sampling original instrumentation rather than flipping samples from records. A single from the album, The Bomb, was used to promote the premiere of the Cartoon Network live-action TV film Level Up in late 2011. In 2014, he released an album titled Encino Man.

In 2019, he released "They Don't Make Em Like Me", included in the official Motorola Razr advertisement, which was based on Motorola's default ringtone for the new Razr. On April 24, 2020, he released his eighth studio album: Gotta Good Feelin'.

The single "Step on Out" by Pigeon John and Spencer Ludwig was prominently featured in television and online advertisements for the 2024 Chevrolet Trax compact crossover SUV.

== Personal life ==
John was married to Harmony Dust from 2002 to 2010.

== Discography ==
=== Studio albums ===
- Is Clueless (2001)
- Is Dating Your Sister (2003)
- Sings the Blues (2005)
- And the Summertime Pool Party (2006)
- Dragon Slayer (2010)
- Encino Man (2014)
- Good Sinner (2016)
- Rap Record (2017)
- Gold (2017) (with Flynn, as Rootbeer)
- Gotta Good Feelin' (2020)

== Filmography ==
- 2001 Training Day as Ned Stacey
- 2003 2 Fast 2 Furious as Brent Carlson
- 2003 Bringing Down the House as Sip Epps
- 2005 Four Brothers as Bubba Flock
- 2006 Gridiron Gang as Jake Carter

== Awards and nominations ==
Year	Association	Category	Nominated work	Result
2003	DEM Awards	Best Artist	Himself	Won
