= Always Has Been =

EP by J-Live
- Released: 2003
- Recorded: 1995–1997
- Genre: Hip-hop
- Length: 25:31
- Label: Triple Threat Productions

J-Live chronology
| All of the Above (2002) | Always Has Been (2003) | Always Will Be (2003) |

Professional ratings
Review scores
| Source | Rating |
|---|---|
| AllMusic | 4/5 stars |
| Pitchfork | 6.4/10 |

Always Has Been is an EP by indie hip-hop artist J-Live, released in 2003 on Triple Threat Productions. It consists of six songs recorded early in J-Live's career, prior to the release of his first album The Best Part. It was released simultaneously with Always Will Be, another EP by J-Live.

The tracks "Braggin Writes" and "Schools In" were rerecorded for The Best Part. The tracks "Longevity", "Can I Get It", and "Hush the Crowd" had not been released on either of J-Live's previous albums.

== Track listing ==
1. "Longevity" - (5:09)
2. "Braggin Writes" - (3:12)
3. "Can I Get It" - (4:11)
4. "Hush the Crowd" - (4:31)
5. "Braggin Writes" (Dome Cracker remix) - (3:49)
6. "Schools In" - (4:39)
