= Re-Entry (Marley Marl album) =

Re Entry

Studio album by Marley Marl
- Released: November 2, 2001
- Recorded: 2000–01
- Studios: House Of Hits (Chestnut Ridge, NY); Pauls Studio (Queens, NY)
- Genre: Hip-hop
- Length: 56:09
- Label: BBE Music
- Producers: 88-Fingers; Easy Mo Bee; J-Force; Kev Brown; Marley Marl

Marley Marl chronology
| Hip Hop Dictionary (2000) | Re Entry (2001) | Hip Hop Lives (2007) |

Beat Generation series chronology
| PeteStrumentals (2001) | Re-Entry (2001) | The Magnificent (2002) |

Professional ratings
Review scores
| Source | Rating |
|---|---|
| AllMusic | 3/5 stars |
| Altrap | 8/10 |

Re-Entry is the fourth studio album by American hip-hop record producer Marley Marl. It was released on November 2, 2001 via Barely Breaking Even, serving as the fourth installment in BBE Music Beat Generation series. Recording sessions took place at House of Hits in Chestnut Ridge, NY and at Pauls Studio in Queens. Beside Marl, production was handled by 88-Fingers, Easy Mo Bee, J-Force and Kev Brown. It features guest appearances from Edwin Birdsong, J. Wells, Seven Shawn, Big Daddy Kane, Capone, Grap Luva, Kev Brown, Larry-O, Miss Man, Roy Ayers, Solo, The Hemmingways and Troy Sluggs.

== Track listing ==
| No. | Title | Producer(s) | Length |
|---|---|---|---|
| 1. | "Intro" | Marley Marl | 0:59 |
| 2. | "Do U Remember" | Marley Marl | 1:18 |
| 3. | "Three's Company" (featuring Big Daddy Kane) | Marley Marl | 4:20 |
| 4. | "Spazz" (featuring Solo) | Easy Mo Bee; Marley Marl | 4:28 |
| 5. | "Just Funky" | Marley Marl | 4:13 |
| 6. | "Who's Sicker" (featuring The Hemmingways) | Marley Marl | 3:55 |
| 7. | "Lost Beat" | Marley Marl | 3:45 |
| 8. | "Easy Type Shit" (featuring Seven Shawn) | 88-Fingers; Marley Marl | 5:25 |
| 9. | "Live Ova Beats" | 88-Fingers; Marley Marl | 2:10 |
| 10. | "Foundation Symphony" (featuring Larry 0, Seven Shawn, J. Wells and Miss Man) | J-Force; Marley Marl | 3:29 |
| 11. | "So Good" (featuring J. Wells and Edwin Birdsong) | Marley Marl | 3:14 |
| 12. | "Hummin'" (featuring Roy Ayers and Edwin Birdsong) | Marley Marl | 5:08 |
| 13. | "Big Faces" | Marley Marl | 2:43 |
| 14. | "What Ruling Means" (featuring Kev Brown and Grap Luva) | Kev Brown; Marley Marl | 4:45 |
| 15. | "What U Hold Down" (featuring Troy S.L.U.G.S. and Capone) | Marley Marl | 3:53 |
| 16. | "NY, NY" | Marley Marl | 2:24 |
| Total length: | | | 56:09 |
