= Best Part =

Best Part or The Best Part may refer to:

- "Best Part" (song), a song by Daniel Caesar and H.E.R.
- "Best Part", a song by Day6 from the EP The Book of Us: Gravity
- "Best Part", a song by Katey Sagal from the album Well...
- "The Best Part (Interlude)", a song by Meghan Trainor from the album Title
- The Best Part (album), a 2001 album by J-Live
- The Best Part (film), a 1956 film directed by Yves Allégret and starring Gérard Philipe
