= Dame Fortune (album) =

Studio album by RJD2
- Released: March 25, 2016
- Genre: Hip-hop; soul
- Length: 44:01
- Label: RJ's Electrical Connections
- Producer: RJD2

RJD2 chronology
More Is Than Isn't (2013)	Dame Fortune (2016)	The Fun Ones (2020)

Dame Fortune is the sixth studio album by RJD2. It was released on RJ's Electrical Connections on March 25, 2016. Recorded in Philadelphia, it features guest appearances from Jordan Brown, Son Little, Phonte Coleman, Blueprint, and Josh Krajcik.

== Critical reception ==
Professional ratings
Aggregate scores
Source	Rating
Metacritic	71/100
Review scores
Source	Rating
AllMusic	4/5 stars
Clash	5/10
Consequence of Sound	C+
DIY	3/5 stars
Exclaim!	7/10
HipHopDX	3.8/5
Slant Magazine	3/5 stars

At Metacritic, which assigns a weighted average score out of 100 to reviews from mainstream critics, the album received an average score of 71, based on 10 reviews, indicating "generally favorable reviews".

David Jeffries of AllMusic gave the album 4 stars out of 5, calling it "a culmination album with an artist's evolution pushing things forward with all his strengths in tow." Meanwhile, Adam Kivel of Consequence of Sound gave the album a grade of C+, saying: "The entirety of the record, in fact, feels like it's trailing a few years behind."

Uproxx placed it at number 13 on the "Best Experimental and Electronic Albums of 2016" list.

== Track listing ==
No.	Title	Length
1.	"A Portal Inward"	2:47
2.	"The Roaming Hoard"	2:33
3.	"Peace of What" (featuring Jordan Brown)	3:29
4.	"The Sheboygan Left"	4:50
5.	"A New Theory"	2:04
6.	"We Come Alive" (featuring Son Little)	4:34
7.	"PF, Day One"	4:55
8.	"Saboteur" (featuring Phonte Coleman)	3:59
9.	"Your Nostalgic Heart and Lung"	4:42
10.	"Up in the Clouds" (featuring Blueprint)	4:48
11.	"Band of Matron Saints" (featuring Josh Krajcik)	4:02
12.	"Portals Outward"	1:20
