= Unlimited EP =

EP by Soul Position
- Released: August 27, 2002
- Genre: Hip-hop
- Length: 21:50
- Label: Rhymesayers Entertainment
- Producer: RJD2

Soul Position chronology
Unlimited EP (2002)	8 Million Stories (2003)

Professional ratings
Review scores
Source	Rating
HipHopDX	(8.5/10)
Pitchfork	(8.0/10)
Rap Reviews	10/10 stars

Unlimited EP is the debut EP by American hip-hop duo Soul Position. It was released on Rhymesayers Entertainment in 2002. The album was produced by RJD2 with all vocal duties being handled by Blueprint. "Oxford You Really Owe Me" is an instrumental track.

== Track listing ==
No.	Title	Length
1.	"Intro"	0:42
2.	"Unlimited"	3:27
3.	"Mic Control"	4:09
4.	"Night to Remember"	4:02
5.	"Take Your Time"	5:04
6.	"Oxford You Really Owe Me"	4:26
