= Dillagence II =

2026 studio album by Busta Rhymes and J Dilla

Studio album by Busta Rhymes and J Dilla
- Released: August 25, 2026
- Genre: Hip-hop
- Length: 60:20
- Label: The Conglomerate
- Producers: J Dilla; Karriem Riggins; Black Milk; Kev Brown; Jimmy Jam and Terry Lewis; Koal the Kount Harrison

Busta Rhymes chronology
Blockbusta (2025)	Dillagence II (2026)

J Dilla chronology
The Diary (2016)	Dillagence II (2026)

Singles from Dillagence 2
- 1. "Spazzz" Released: August 5, 2026; 2. "Talk Ya Shit" Released: August 13, 2026; 3. "Back Pain, Chest Pain, Head Pain" Released: October 15, 2026

Dillagence II is a collaborative studio album by the American rapper Busta Rhymes and record producer J Dilla. It was released on August 25, 2026, through the Conglomerate Entertainment. Prior to its release, Busta Rhymes revealed that he received over 300 beats from J Dilla prior to his death in 2006, which all remained private except for Raekwon's Only Built 4 Cuban Linx... Pt. II (2009). The album served as a follow-up to his previous album, Blockbusta (2023).

The album features guest appearances from D'Angelo, Big Sean, Anderson .Paak, Ludacris, Lil Wayne, Common, Jon Batiste, Talib Kweli, T3, Honey Bxby, and La Reezy. To promote Dillagence II, Busta Rhymes released the music videos for "Spazzz", "Talk Ya Shit" (with Lil Wayne), "This Woman" (with D'Angelo), and "Back Pain, Chest Pain, Head Pain", with the third not being a single. The album was approved by J Dilla's estate and his mother, Ma Dukes, and features a different rapping approach from Busta Rhymes in contrast to its speeding technique.

Dillagence II received a positive reception from music critics for Busta Rhymes and J Dilla's collaborative chemistry, its varied tracks, and guest appearances. Commercially, the album peaked at number 91 on the UK Album Downloads chart. Dillagence II, along with "This Woman", are nominees for Best Rap Album and Best Melodic Rap Performance at the 69th Annual Grammy Awards, respectively.

== Background ==
Busta Rhymes and J Dilla held a long-standing professional relationship prior to the latter's death. J Dilla contributed to six of Busta Rhymes' first seven studio albums, excluding Extinction Level Event: The Final World Front (1998). Various tracks that J Dilla produced for Busta Rhymes included "Still Shining" (1996), "Show Me What You Got" (2000), and "Turn Me Up Some" (2002).

In November 2007, over a year after J Dilla's death, Busta Rhymes released the mixtape Dillagence, hosted by DJ Mick Boogie. It features Busta Rhymes rapping over J Dilla's beats and guest appearances from Q-Tip, Phonte, Talib Kweli, Raekwon, M.O.P., and Rah Digga.

During an interview with GQ in 2020, Busta Rhymes revealed that J Dilla gave him over 300 beats that he considered to be "extremely selective with", revealing that the only time he gave a beat from the collection was for Raekwon's Only Built 4 Cuban Linx... Pt. II (2009). Busta Rhymes considered J Dilla as one of his favorite three producers, which includes Dr. Dre and Q-Tip.

== Production and composition ==
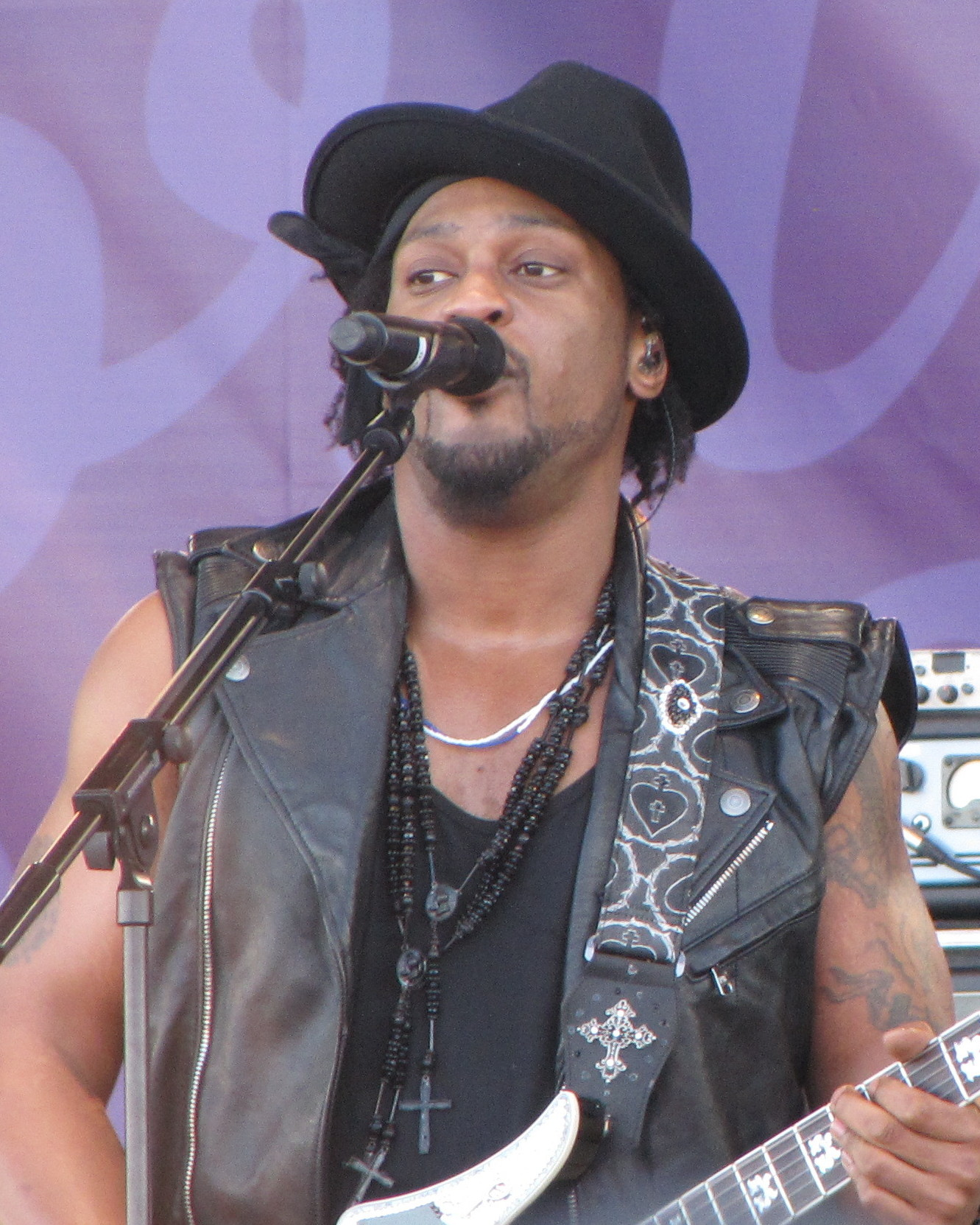
"This Woman" features posthumous vocals from D'Angelo, which was later nominated for a Grammy.

Conceptualizing the album began in November 2025 with the approval of J Dilla's estate and Yancey. Busta Rhymes had a phone call from Ma Dukes (also known as Maureen Yancey), Yancey's mother, asking him if he could celebrate "the 20th anniversary of Dilla's transition." Busta Rhymes decides to simply record a song before it evolved into a full album. During an interview with Popcast's Jon Caramanica and Joe Coscarelli, Busta Rhymes said that his rapping style on J Dilla's beats was different in contrast to his speeding technique.

Dillagence II contains nineteen tracks and features guest appearances from Big Sean, Anderson .Paak, Ludacris, Lil Wayne, Common, Jon Batiste, Talib Kweli, T3, Honey Bxby, and La Reezy, as well as posthumous vocals from D'Angelo recorded over 20 years ago for an unfinished J Dilla collab prior to the album. Busta Rhymes received permission from D'Angelo's family to use his vocals. Some of the guest features were done in person while others' vocals were laid down.

The album is described as structured as a mixtape, with shorter tracks, less choruses, experimental production, and "gonzo flows". Ma Dukes appears on the album's intro and outro tracks. Outside of tracks that were solely produced by J Dilla, Black Milk and Kev Brown co-produced "Spazz" and Karriem Riggins produced "What We Got in Common" and "Drugs", with the latter being the only track not involving any production from J Dilla.

=== Tracks ===
"Spazz" progresses through three beats in way that Quincy of Ratings Game Music described as "feeling like a musical karate kick to the chest." "This Woman" is based on a "raw and unfinished" collab with D'Angelo, where he does "some falsetto Sister Nancy lines" that Pitchfork writer Christopher R. Weingarten compared to his work on the album Voodoo (2000).

"Wait 4 U" features an "old-school" R&B influence merged with hip-hop as Honey Bxby sings a "passionate chorus". Busta Rhymes brings a love-themed verse while Big Sean emphasizes punchlines and a laid-back flow. On "Kingpin (Knock Ya Head Off)", Ludacris raps "outlandish" lyrics including jokes about cancel culture, while the track features a competitive-level verse from Busta Rhymes and a smooth chorus from Anderson .Paak.

"How You Want It" features a "Dilla time" snare considered "off the beat" that the track progresses unsteadily. "Talk Ya Shit" uses a "slowed-down" Gilberto Gil sample with a feature from Lil Wayne that emphasizes punchlines and contains no autotune. Busta Rhymes uses a relaxed approach much like Wayne's on the track. The album's closer, "What We Got in Common", pushes J Dilla's production into a melodramatic presence that sounds like "they're both gunning for second Oscars."

== Promotion and release ==
On February 19, 2026, Busta Rhymes held a listening session for a project with production from J Dilla. He announced the album under the name Dillagence 2, which serves as a sequel to the 2007 original mixtape released by Busta Rhymes and DJ Mick Boogie. With details of the album remaining scarce, it was noted that Lil Wayne was featured on one of the tracks, which a video of the preview was recorded by Statik Selektah and posted on Instagram. On August 4, Busta Rhymes announced that Dillagence 2 would release soon with a release date of August 25. The teaser posted on Instagram features a clip of Ma Dukes listening to one of the album's tracks. On August 6, Busta Rhymes released the album's lead single "Spazzz", which contains multiple beat switches throughout. A music video for the single was released three days later.

On August 13, the album's second single "Talk Ya Shit" was released, featuring an appearance from Lil Wayne. Its music video was released three days later. On August 20, Busta Rhymes revealed the track list from Dillagence II, featuring various artists on many of its tracks. On August 23, Busta Rhymes shared a snippet of the music video for "This Woman", which was directed by Hype Williams. Featuring posthumous vocals from D'Angelo, the track's music video was released two days later. Dillagence II was released on streaming services on August 25, through the Conglomerate. On October 15, he released "Back Pain, Chest Pain, Head Pain" as the album's third single, along with an accompanied music video.

== Reception ==
Professional ratings
Review scores
Source	Rating
Pitchfork	7.0/10
Ratings Game Music	B

Commercially, on the week of August 28, 2026, Dillagence II peaked at number 91 on the UK Album Downloads chart. Critically, Christopher R. Weingarten of Pitchfork wrote that the Dillagence II was "slightly less exciting than the original, but still full of thrills". He additionally considered the album to capture Busta Rhymes and J Dilla's "vintage magic in a sturdy, powerful package."

Ryan Dillon of Glide Magazine praised the album for its collaborative chemistry between Busta Rhymes' vocals and J Dilla's instrumentals. He noted that each track on the album stands out narratively and that "seamless transitions between the varying moods" of the tracks are present. Dillon concluded that Dillagence II serves as one of Busta Rhymes' most "memorable and urgent music" he released in decades. Quincy of Ratings Game Music noted that Busta Rhyme's "incredibly sharp" artistry shines on J Dilla's production, and he also considered the guest appearances to be another major strength of the album.

=== Accolades ===
Shortly after its release, Busta Rhymes submitted Dillagence II for consideration in the Best Rap Album category for the 69th Annual Grammy Awards. On November 16, 2026, the album was announced to be a nominee for Best Rap Album. The Grammy award ceremony, which is set to take place on February 7, 2027, would coincide with J Dilla's 53rd birthday. In addition, one of the album's tracks, "This Woman", was included as a nominee for Best Melodic Rap Performance. J Dilla was previous nominated for a Grammy Award once, which was for Best Rap Performance by a Duo or Group for his production on A Tribe Called Quest's "1nce Again" (1996) at the 39th Annual Grammy Awards in 1997.

== Track listing ==
All music is produced by J Dilla, except when noted.

No.	Title	Writer(s)	Producer(s)	Length
1.	"Ma Dukes Speak Again"	Trevor Smith; James Yancey; John Lennon; Paul McCartney		1:21
2.	"How the Boss Will Deliver"	T. Smith; Yancey; Russ Ballard		1:22
3.	"Entry" (featuring La Reezy)	T. Smith; Yancey; Khayree Salahuddin		2:06
4.	"Spazzz"	T. Smith; Yancey; Curtis Cross; Jacqueline Members; Kev Brown; M. Robinson; Peter Gage; Paul Korda; Robert Poindexter; William Robinson Jr.	J Dilla; Black Milk; Brown	3:09
5.	"Back Pain, Chest Pain, Head Pain"	T. Smith; Yancey		4:20
6.	"Royalty" (featuring CIE and Trillian)	T. Smith; Yancey; Aaron Paris; C. Smith; Elgie Stover; James Nyx; K. Harrison Anna Gaye; Marvin Gaye; T. Wood-Smith; William R. Henley-Dias	J Dilla; Koal the Kount Harrison	4:20
7.	"This Woman" (featuring D'Angelo)	T. Smith; Yancey; Michael Archer; Fela Kuti; Ophlin Russell	J Dilla; Jimmy Jam and Terry Lewis	4:21
8.	"Shoo"	T. Smith; Yancey; Mathias Camison; Pierre-Alain Dahan		2:05
9.	"Drugs" (featuring C.S. Armstrong)	T. Smith; Yancey; C.S. Aromstrong	Karriem Riggins	2:24
10.	"The Story of the Old Man"	T. Smith; Yancey		1:21
11.	"Run Em Down" (featuring Watch the Duck)	T. Smith; Yancey; Jesse Rankins; R. Saddler		3:16
12.	"Lay Down" (featuring T3)	T. Smith; Yancey; R.L. Altman III; R. Dexter; RJ Bearns		2:28
13.	"Wait 4 U" (featuring Big Sean and Honey Bxby)	T. Smith; Yancey; Sean Anderson; Ajaysiya Byers; Ames D. Yancey		4:12
14.	"Kingpin (Knock Ya Head Off)" (featuring Anderson .Paak and Ludacris)	T. Smith; Yancey; D. Simmons; H.N. Mancini; Mike Hankinson; Talib Greene		4:28
15.	"How You Want It"	T. Smith; Yancey; James Brown		3:40
16.	"Love & War" (featuring C.S. Armstrong and Talib Kweli)	T. Smith; Yancey; Greene; Armstrong; Isao Tomito; Modest Mussorgsky		4:57
17.	"Talk Ya Shit" (featuring Lil Wayne)	T. Smith; Yancey; Dwayne Carter; Gilberto Gill		2:27
18.	"What We Got in Common" (featuring Common and Jon Batiste)	T. Smith; Yancey; Jon Batiste; K. Riggins; L.L. Rashid	J Dilla; Riggins	6:21
19.	"Ma Dukes & J Dilla Closing Word"	T. Smith; Yancey		1:42
Total length:				60:20

== Personnel ==
Credits were adapted from Tidal.

- Alex Psaroudakis – mastering (all tracks)
- Leandro Alvarez – assistant mastering (all tracks)
- Rene Desrivieres – mixing (tracks 1, 3, 5–6, 8, 10–11, 13, 19); recording (tracks 3, 5–11, 13–18)
- Euglen Tanci – recording (tracks 1–3, 11–16, 18–19)
- CIE – background vocals (track 2)
- Serge Tsai – mixing (tracks 2, 7, 9, 12, 14–18)
- Rohan Gulati – assistant mixing (tracks 2, 6–10, 12–14, 16–19)
- Kyle Hill – assistant mixing (tracks 2–3, 6, 8–9, 12, 14–15, 17–19)
- Jack Smack Vayo – assistant mixing (track 3)
- Rick St. Hilaire – recording (tracks 4–5, 9); mixing (track 4)
- Gonzalo Conteras – mixing (track 4); recording (track 5, 17)
- Delanie Leyden – assistant sound engineer (track 4); recording (track 6)
- Jimmy Jam – additional production (track 7)
- Terry Lewis – additional production (track 7)
- Renee Ruth – assistant mixing (tracks 7, 15)
- Sasha Kashperko – guitar (tracks 9, 11)
- Ernest Ness Butler – assistant mixing (track 11)
- Daniel Feliz – assistant mixing (track 11)
- Jon Batiste – piano (track 18)
- Carlo Pena – assistant sound engineer (track 18)

== Charts ==
Chart performance for Dillagence II
Chart (2026)	Peak position
UK Album Downloads (Official Charts)	91
