= Hezekiah (rapper) =

American rapper

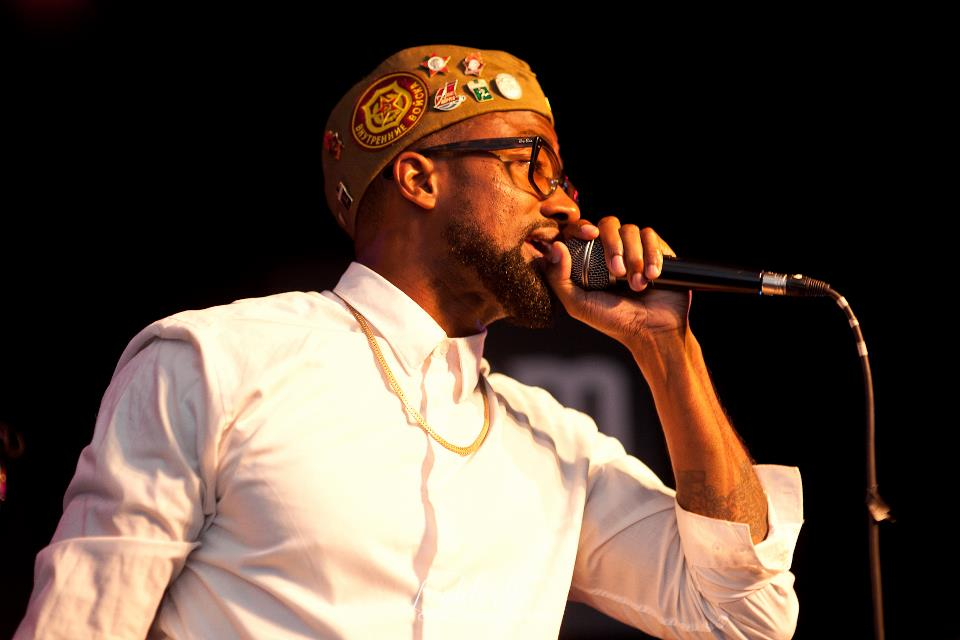
- Hezekiah performing live.

Background information
- Born: Hezekiah Davis III; November 18, 1972 (age 53); Chester, Pennsylvania, United States
- Genres: Hip hop
- Occupations: Rapper, singer-songwriter, record producer
- Years active: 1995–present
- Label: Rawkus Soulspazm 3crates
- Website: 3crates.bandcamp.com

Hezekiah Davis III (born November 18, 1972), better known by his stage name Hezekiah, is an American rapper, singer-songwriter, and record producer. He is founder of the producer showcase, Beat Society. He is lead singer of the band Johnny Popcorn. Hezekiah was born in Chester, Pennsylvania and raised in New Castle, Delaware. He currently resides in Philadelphia.

He has produced for Zap Mama, Eric Roberson, Blu, and Wordsworth.

His production has been featured in TV and films. He has scored for the 2002–2003 Showtime series Street Time. In 2008, he co-produced the score for the PBS documentary First Person.

He has written songs for singer Bilal. The songs include "Think It Over" from Bilal's Airtight's Revenge and "Back to Love", "Winning Hand", and "Climbing" from Bilal's A Love Surreal.

== Early life ==
Hezekiah was born Hezekiah Davis III in Chester, Pennsylvania and raised in New Castle, Delaware. He grew up in a musical family where at an early age he sang at his family's church. During his elementary years, Hezekiah's cousin introduced him to the art of production in the form of a track and drum machine. He began to develop his progressive approach to hip hop and began performing in his family's living room with his cousin on bass and uncle on guitar. In high school, Hezekiah sold his demo mix tape "Exit Wound Status". After high school he hit the Philly hip hop scene where he joined the network of artists which included Musiq Soulchild, Bilal, The Roots, Jazzyfatnastees, and Bahamadia.

== Career ==
In 2005, Hezekiah's first album, Hurry Up & Wait, was released on Soulspazm Records. Also in 2005, Hezekiah was hired to produce with Tone Whitfield the music for a Showtime original series, Street Time. While producing and recording his album Hurry Up and Wait, Hezekiah began working on albums for Philadelphia singer Aaron Livingston and Musiq Soulchild's backup singers, Aaries.

In 2007, his second album, I Predict a Riot, was released jointly by Soulspazm Records and Rawkus Records before Rawkus folded but was re-released again by Soulspazm Records. His third album, Conscious Porn, was released in 2010.

In 2011, he teamed up with west coast producer and artist Ishe to release the Ishe + Hezekiah Project. While working in the studio with his friend and producer Tone Whitfield, the duo created the persona Johnny Popcorn to release alternative rock/soul music. In 2011, they released an EP, titled Hezekiah and Tone Whitfield Are: Johnny Popcorn. This project was followed in 2012 by Johnny Popcorn album, The Crow.

In 2015, he released an album, Dreams Don't Chase Themselves.

== Discography ==
=== Albums ===
- Hurry Up & Wait (2005)
- I Predict a Riot (2007)
- Conscious Porn (2010)
- Ishe + Hezekiah Project (2011) (with Ishe)
- The Crow (2012) (with Tone Whitfield, as Johnny Popcorn)
- Summer in Vienna (2014) (with DJ Buzz, Mystic, and Dave Ghetto, as This, That & the 3rd)
- Dreams Don't Chase Themselves (2015)
- Totem Pole (2016) (with Tone Whitfield, as Johnny Popcorn)

=== EPs ===
- Hezekiah and Tone Whitfield Are: Johnny Popcorn (2010) (with Tone Whitfield, as Johnny Popcorn)
- 19720 (2016)

=== Singles ===
- "The Zip" b/w "Insecure" (1997)
- "Is It Just Music?" (2001)
- "Gypsy Slang" (2003)
- "Soul Music" (2005)
- "Next Episode" (2013) (with Tone Whitfield, as Johnny Popcorn)
- "Secret" (2013) (with Tone Whitfield, as Johnny Popcorn)
- "Go People" (2013)
- "Can I Live?" (2014)
- "Hologram Dreams" (2015)

=== Guest appearances ===
- Grand Agent – "Reluctant Rapper" from Under the Circumstances (2005)
- Random – "Don't Let Me Die" from The Call (2006)
- Waxolutionists – "Dance with Me" and "Feet Don't Fail Me" from We Paint Colors (2009)
- Eric Roberson – "Male Ego" from Mister Nice Guy (2011)
- Illvibe Collective – "Over Now" from All Together Now (2011)
- JR & PH7 – "Poppin' Fly" from The Good Life (2012)
- Trek Life – "Beautiful People" from Hometown Foreigner (2013)
- Hasan Salaam – "Jericho" from Life in Black & White (2014)
- Soulpete – "Dead or Alive" from Soul Raw (2015)
- Grand Agent – "Spiterature Pt. 2" (2015)
- Dizz1 – "Shots Fired" (2016)

=== Productions ===
- Grand Agent – "The Jig Is Up (Hezekiah Remix)" and "Unite (Hezekiah Remix)" from Fish Outta Water: The Remixes (2003)
- Zap Mama – "Yelling Away (Hezekiah Remix)" (2004)
- J-Live – "Fire Water" from The Hear After (2005)
- Akrobatik – "Step It Up" from Absolute Value (2008)
- Kindred the Family Soul – "Take a Look Around" from Love Has No Recession (2011)
- Blu – "Burgandy" from Jesus (2011)
- The Perceptionists – "Sak Pase" (2011)
- Eric Roberson – "Strangers" and "Male Ego" from Mister Nice Guy (2011)
- Range Da Messenga – Battle Cry EP (2013)
- Hasan Salaam – "Jericho" and "Unorganized Religion" from Life in Black & White (2014)
- Akrobatik – "Stop and Stare" from Built to Last (2014)
