= Dame Fortune =

Dame Fortune may refer to:

- Fortuna, goddess
- Dame Fortune, character in the Roman de Fauvel
- Dame Fortune, from the Tarot Wheel of Fortune card
- Dame Fortune (album), album by RJD2 2016
- "Dame Fortune", a song by XTC from the album Fuzzy Warbles Volume 1
