= Blockbusta =

Studio album by Busta Rhymes
- Released: November 24, 2023
- Genre: Hip-hop
- Length: 62:16
- Labels: The Conglomerate; Epic
- Producers: Busta Rhymes; Pharrell; Timbaland; Swizz Beatz; Anatii; BabeTruth; Beam; Cardiak; Ceebeaats; Cool & Dre; Dez Wright; DJ Khalil; DJ Ted Smooth; Fantom; Focus...; Hitmaka; Khozee; Landstrip Chip; Lovi; Meed Beatz; Mike & Keys; MyGuyMars; Nami; Navi Beats; OzMoses Arketex; Schife; SkipOnDaBeat; Wheezy

Busta Rhymes chronology
Extinction Level Event 2: The Wrath of God (2020)	Blockbusta (2023)	Dillagence II (2026)

Singles from Blockbusta
- 1. "Beach Ball" Released: June 23, 2023; 2. "Luxury Life" Released: September 8, 2023; 3. "OK" Released: November 11, 2023; 4. "Legacy" Released: November 23, 2023

Blockbusta (stylized in all caps) is the eleventh studio album by American rapper Busta Rhymes. It was released on November 24, 2023, through his own Conglomerate Entertainment label with distribution by Epic Records. Busta Rhymes executive produced the album alongside Pharrell Williams, Timbaland, and Swizz Beatz. It is his first studio album in over three years following 2020's Extinction Level Event 2: The Wrath of God and features guest appearances from Quavo, Bia, Young Thug, Blxst, Yung Bleu, Coi Leray, DaBaby, T-Pain, Burna Boy, Swizz Beatz, Blackway, Jnr Choi, Chris Brown, Shenseea, Giggs, Kodak Black, Morray, Cie, Trillian, Rai, and Big Tigger.

The album was supposed to be supported by the Blockbusta Tour, set to begin on March 13, 2024 at the SF Masonic Auditorium in San Francisco, California, and end on April 21, 2024 at the Brooklyn Paramount Theater in Brooklyn, New York. The tour was later cancelled on March 8, 2024 with no explanation.

== Background ==
The announcement of the album follows the singles "Beach Ball" featuring Bia, "Murda" featuring Bilal, and "Luxury Life" featuring Coi Leray, which were released throughout 2023. The full tracklist was revealed on November 16.

== Critical reception ==
Professional ratings
Aggregate scores
Source	Rating
Metacritic	53/100
Review scores
Source	Rating
AllMusic	2.5/5 stars
American Songwriter	2/5
Clash	6/10
Evening Standard	4/5 stars
HipHopDX	3/5
The i Paper	3/5 stars
RapReviews	4.5/10

Blockbusta received a score of 53 out of 100 on review aggregator Metacritic based on five critics' reviews, indicating "mixed or average" reception.

AllMusic praised the album for containing plenty of "fun and excitement", but felt that many of the tracks were poorly executed, writing: "Busta Rhymes sounds like he's reaching for something different on almost every track and not quite grabbing ahold of any of it." Robin Murray of Clash praised Busta Rhymes for stepping outside his comfort zone, writing that the album contained "moments of real bravery". However, he criticized the album for its lack of cohesion and Busta Rhymes' lack of chemistry with the album's guest artists.

== Track listing ==
Blockbusta track listing
No.	Title	Writer(s)	Producer(s)	Length
1.	"The Statement"	Trevor Smith Jr.; Timothy Mosley; Jose Valezquez; Jackson Paul LoMastro	Timbaland; BabeTruth	2:34
2.	"Remind 'Em" (featuring Quavo)	T. Smith; Quavious Keyate Marshall; Carter Britz	Fantom	3:21
3.	"Beach Ball" (featuring Bia)	T. Smith; Bianca Landrau; Tyshane Thompson; Christian Ward; Jordan Holt-May; Edgar Ferrera	Beam; Hitmaka; Landstrip Chip; SkipOnDaBeat; Enoch Harris III^{[a]}	2:24
4.	"OK" (with Cool & Dre featuring Young Thug)	T. Smith; Jeffery Lamar Williams; Marcello Valenzano; Andre Lyon; Lovi Delano Baker; Maximilian McFarlin; Elin Zamora	Cool & Dre; Lovi; Zamora^{[a]}; McFarlin^{[a]}	4:06
5.	"Could It Be You" (featuring Blxst and Yung Bleu)	T. Smith; Matthew Burdette; Jeremy Biddle; Salaam Remi; Jermaine Cole; Miguel Pimentel	OzMoses Arketex; Zamora^{[a]}; McFarlin^{[a]}	3:06
6.	"Luxury Life" (featuring Coi Leray)	T. Smith; Coi Leray Collins; Kasseem Dean; Brian Potter; Dennis Lambert; Drü Oliver; William Thomas; August Moon	Swizz Beatz; Busta Rhymes	2:18
7.	"Big Everything" (featuring DaBaby and T-Pain)	T. Smith; I. B. Lewis; Joseph McVey; Chad Butler; Jay Jenkins; Shawn Carter; Bernard Freeman; Leroy Williams Jr.	Busta Rhymes; Schife	4:01
8.	"Roboshotta" (featuring Burna Boy)	T. Smith; Damini Ebunoluwa Ogulu; Pharrell Williams	Pharrell	2:05
9.	"Tings"	T. Smith; P. Williams	Pharrell	3:07
10.	"The Return of Mansa Musa" (featuring Swizz Beatz and Blackway)	T. Smith; Dean; Manu Dibango; Yaw Sintim-misa	Swizz Beatz	3:25
11.	"Stand Up" (featuring Jnr Choi)	T. Smith; Momodou Junior Choi; Michel Sotolongo; Stevie Wonder; Claude Francis	Busta Rhymes; Navi Beats; Ceebeaats	3:46
12.	"Open Wide" (featuring Chris Brown and Shenseea)	T. Smith; Christopher Brown; Chinsea Lee; Anathi Mnyango; Sintim-misa	Anatii	2:47
13.	"Hold Up"	T. Smith; Mosley; Dylan Clearly-Kell; Dylan Ismael Teixeira	Timbaland; Dez Wright; Nami	2:13
14.	"The Hive" (featuring Giggs)	T. Smith; Nathaniel Thompson	Meed Beatz	2:49
15.	"Homage" (featuring Kodak Black)	T. Smith; Bill Kahan Kapri; Wesley Glass	Wheezy Outta Here	3:09
16.	"Legend" (featuring Morray)	T. Smith; Morae Ruffin; Adrian Montes; Kenneth Gamble; Leon Huff	Khozee	3:52
17.	"Slide"	T. Smith; Teddy Mendez; P. Williams; Charles Hugo; Wynton Learson Marsalis; Karen Young; Michael Tyler; Joseph P. Longo; Walter Kahn	DJ Ted Smooth	3:42
18.	"Legacy" (featuring Cie, Trillian, and Rai)	T. Smith; Cacie Smith; Trillian Wood-Smith; Mariah Miskelly; Michael Ray Cox, Jr.; John Groover; Khalil Abdul-Rahman Hazzard; Lamar Daunte Edwards; S. Carter; Moon; Jonathan Burks; Inga Marchand; J. Smith	Mike & Keys; DJ Khalil; MyGuyMars	4:12
19.	"If You Don't Know Now You Know Pt. 2" (featuring Big Tigger)	T. Smith; Darian Morgan; Carl McCormick; Bernard Edwards Jr.	Cardiak; Focus…	5:19
Total length:				62:16

Notes

- ^{^[a]} signifies an additional producer.
- All tracks are stylized in all caps.

== Personnel ==
Musicians

- Busta Rhymes – vocals
- Delanie Leyden – vocals (tracks 6, 11)
- Davine Tuch – keyboards (7)
- Andrew Potts Jr. – vocals (10)
- Chioma Eze – vocals (10)
- James T. Williams Jr. – vocals (10)
- Maryla Roy – vocals (10)
- Micah Houston – vocals (10)
- Ronny Mercedes – vocals (10)
- Sarah Chidebelu-Eze – vocals (10)
- Sugarlane Voices – vocals (10)
- Euglen Tanci – vocals (11)
- Fonz Figgaz – vocals (11)
- A.L. – vocals (11)
- HotBoii Johnny – vocals (11)
- FametheMovie – vocals (11)
- Punchline – vocals (11)
- Choco "GDubs" Reynoso – keyboards (17)
- Jamal Peoples – keyboards (17)
- Rai – keyboards (18)

Technical

- Master Plan – mastering
- Stan Greene – mastering (all tracks), mixing (1–9, 11, 13–19)
- Bainz – mixing, engineering (4)
- Rick St. Hilaire – mixing, engineering (10)
- Brian Stanley – mixing (12), engineering (2, 3, 12), vocal engineering (2)
- Gonzalo "GeeFlowCL" Contreras – mixing (18), engineering (10, 12)
- Delanie Leyden – engineering (1–9, 11–14, 16–19), engineering assistance (10)
- Dub Shakes – engineering (1, 7, 18, 19)
- Enoch Harris III – engineering, vocal engineering (3)
- Jodie Grayson Williams – engineering (4)
- Jeremy Biddle – engineering, vocal engineering (5)
- Blxst – engineering (5)
- Euglen Tanci – engineering (6, 11, 15, 19), engineering assistance (8, 17)
- Drü Oliver – engineering (6)
- Mike Larson – engineering (8)
- Patrizio "Teezio" Pigliapoco – engineering, vocal engineering (12)
- Serge Tsai – engineering, vocal engineering (14)
- Derek Garcia – engineering, vocal engineering (15)
- Treyonce Moore – engineering (16)
- Paul Joasil – engineering assistance (4)
- Sonny Charles – engineering assistance (4)
- Tristan Bott – engineering assistance (7)
- Michael Choi – engineering assistance (18)
- Wyatt Sayre – engineering assistance (18)

== Charts ==
Chart performance for Blockbusta
Chart (2023)	Peak position
UK Album Downloads (Official Charts)	27
UK R&B Albums (Official Charts)	24
US Billboard 200	42
US Top R&B/Hip-Hop Albums (Billboard)	10
