= RJD2 =

American musician and hip-hop producer

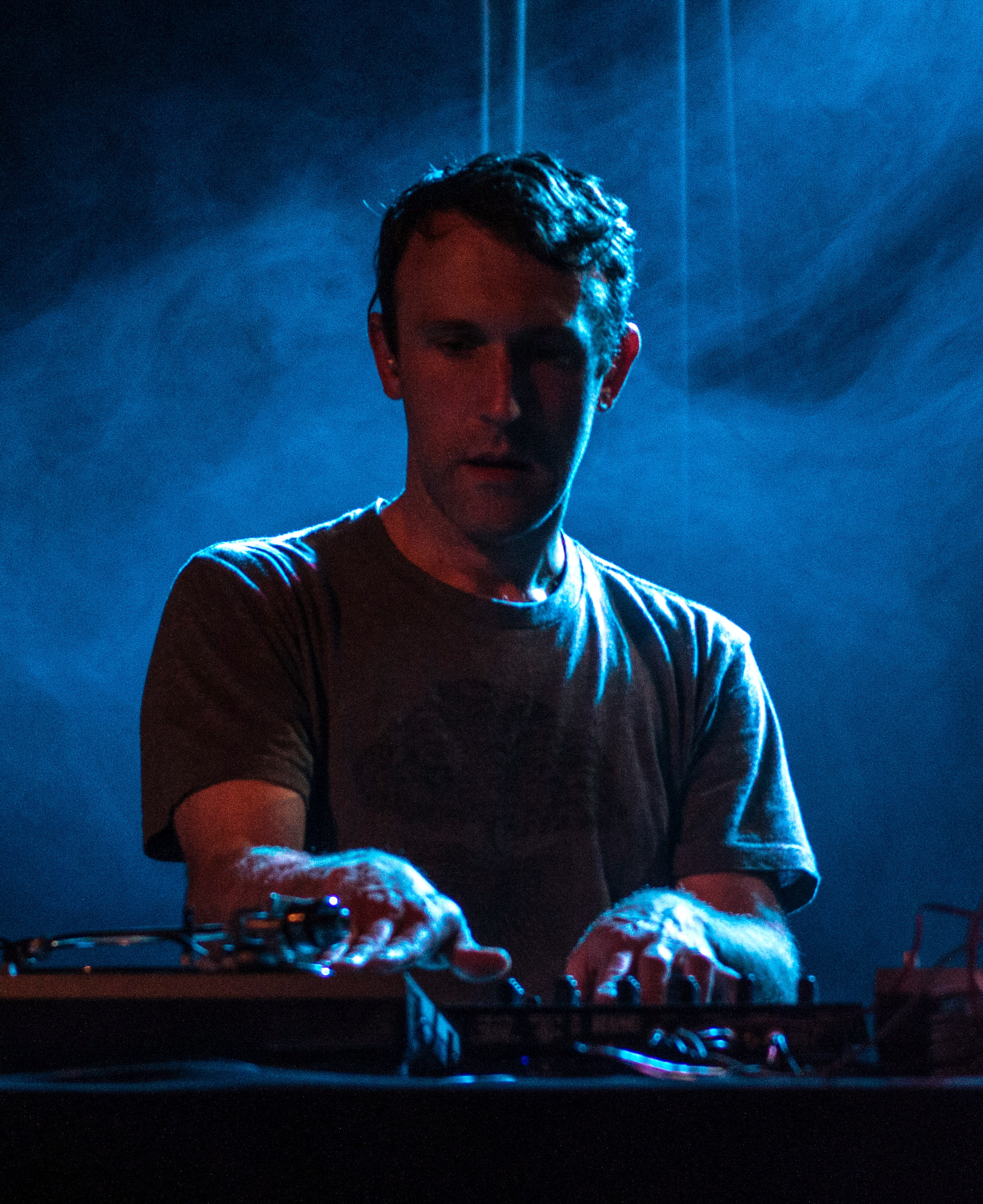
- RJD2 performing at Moogfest in 2014

Background information
- Also known as: RJ; The Insane Warrior
- Born: Ramble Jon Krohn; May 27, 1976 (age 49); Eugene, Oregon, U.S.
- Origin: Columbus, Ohio, U.S.
- Genres: Hip-hop; indie rock
- Occupations: Music producer; DJ
- Years active: 1993–present
- Labels: Definitive Jux; XL Recordings; RJ's Electrical Connections
- Website: www.rjd2.net

Ramble Jon Krohn (born May 27, 1976), better known by his stage name RJD2, is an American musician and record producer based in Columbus, Ohio. He is the owner of record label RJ's Electrical Connections. He has been a member of groups such as Soul Position, MHz Legacy, and Icebird. His stage name derives from the popular Star Wars droid R2-D2.

== Life and career ==
Born in Eugene, Oregon, Krohn was raised in Columbus, Ohio. He began making music in 1993.

In 2002, RJD2 signed to El-P's record label Definitive Jux and released his debut solo studio album, Deadringer, to much acclaim. RJD2 later collaborated with rapper Blueprint under the name Soul Position, releasing 8 Million Stories on Rhymesayers Entertainment in 2003.

He released his second solo studio album, Since We Last Spoke, on Definitive Jux in 2004. Soul Position's second album, Things Go Better with RJ and AL, was released in 2006 under Rhymesayers Entertainment. 2006 also saw the release of Magnificent City, his collaborative album with rapper Aceyalone. Magnificent City includes "A Beautiful Mine", which features in the title sequence of Mad Men.

In 2007, RJD2 released the solo studio album, The Third Hand, on XL Recordings. In 2010, he released his fourth solo studio album, The Colossus, on his own label RJ's Electrical Connections. In 2011, he released the album, We Are the Doorways, under the pseudonym The Insane Warrior.

RJD2 formed Icebird with Aaron Livingston, vocalist of a Philadelphia-based band called The Mean. The duo's debut album, The Abandoned Lullaby, was released in 2011. In 2013, RJD2 released his fifth solo studio album, More Is Than Isn't, on RJ's Electrical Connections.

In 2015, RJD2 released a collaborative album with rapper STS, titled STS x RJD2. His sixth solo studio album, Dame Fortune, was released in 2016.

In 2020, he released his seventh solo studio album, The Fun Ones, on RJ's Electrical Connections. It features guest appearances from Aceyalone, Homeboy Sandman, Jordan Brown, Khari Mateen, and STS.

He released a course on sampling and arranging, RJD2: From Samples to Songs, with online music school Soundfly on July 27, 2021.

== Discography ==
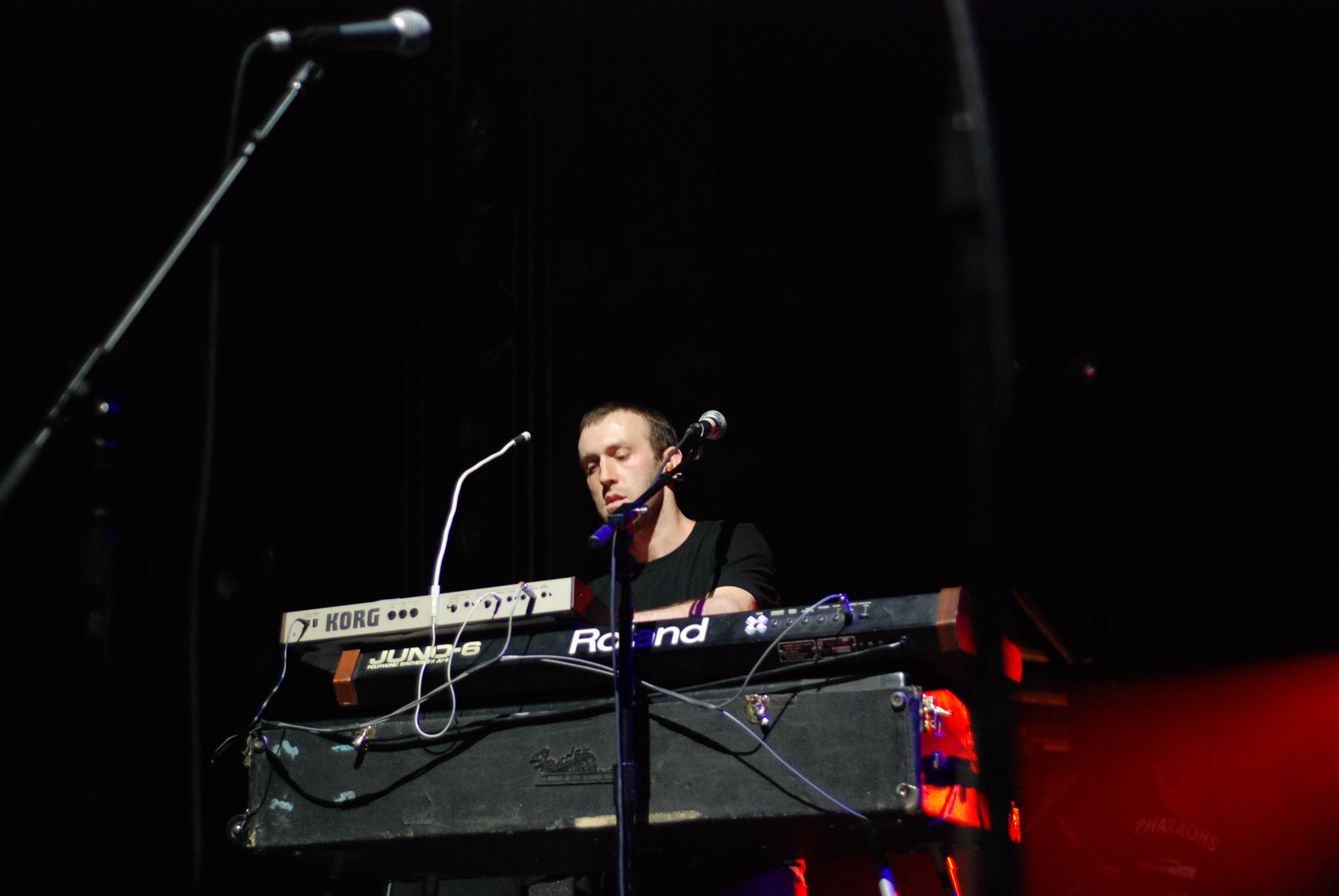
RJD2 in 2007

=== Studio albums ===
- Deadringer (2002)
- Since We Last Spoke (2004)
- Magnificent City (2006) (with Aceyalone)
- The Third Hand (2007)
- The Colossus (2010)
- We Are the Doorways (2011) (as The Insane Warrior)
- The Abandoned Lullaby (2011) (with Aaron Livingston, as Icebird)
- More Is Than Isn't (2013)
- STS x RJD2 (2015) (with STS)
- Dame Fortune (2016)
- Tendrils (2018) (as The Insane Warrior)
- The Fun Ones (2020)
- Escape from Sweet Auburn (2022) (with STS)
- Visions Out of Limelight (2024)
- According To... (2026) (with Supastition)

=== Compilation albums ===
- In Rare Form: Unreleased Instrumentals (2004)
- The Third Hand Instrumentals (2007)
- Inversions of the Colossus (2010)
- In Rare Form, Vol. 2 (2018)

=== Mix albums ===
- Your Face or Your Kneecaps (2001)
- Loose Ends (2003)
- Lobster and Scrimp (2003)
- Constant Elevation (2005)

=== EPs ===
- Pryor Convictions (2000) (with Poppa Hop, as The Dirty Birds)
- The Horror (2003)
- The Mashed Up Mixes (2004)
- Tin Foil Hat (2009)
- The Glow Remixes (2011)

=== Singles ===
- "June" / "The Proxy" (2001)
- "Rain" / "Find You Out" (2002)
- "Here's What's Left" (2002)
- "Let the Good Times Roll" (2002)
- "The Horror" / "Final Frontier (Remix)" (2003)
- "Sell the World" / "Ghostwriter (Remix)" (2003)
- "1976" (2004)
- "Through the Walls" (2004)
- "Exotic Talk" (2004)
- "Fire" (2005) (with Aceyalone)
- "Superhero" (2006) (with Aceyalone)
- "You Never Had It So Good" (2007)
- "No Helmet Up Indianola" (2020)

=== Guest appearances ===
- Pigeon John – "The Last Sunshine" from And the Summertime Pool Party (2006)
- Lushlife + CSLSX – "Toynbee Suite" from Ritualize (2016)

=== Productions ===
- Aesop Rock – "Kill 'Em All Remix" (2001)
- Cannibal Ox - "The F Word (Remix)" (2001)
- Copywrite - "Fuck Sound Check" from Eastern Conference [High & Mighty] (2001)
- Cage – "Among the Sleep" from Movies for the Blind (2002)
- Mos Def/Diverse/Prefuse 73 – "Wylin Out (RJD2 Remix)" (2002)
- RJD2 - "I REALLY Like Your Def Jux Baby Tee" from Def Jux 2 (2002)
- RJD2- "True Confessions" from Urban Renewal Program (2002)
- Souls of Mischief – "Spark" (2002)
- El-P – "Lazerfaces' Warning (RJD2 Remix)" from Fandam Plus (2002)
- Edotkom - "Blind Man's Eye" from Obsidian: The Altered States LP (2002)
- Massive Attack – "Butterfly Caught (RJD2 Remix)" (2002)
- Murs – "Sore Losers" from The End of the Beginning (2003)
- Viktor Vaughn – "Saliva" from Vaudeville Villain (2003)
- The Weathermen – "5 Left in the Clip (RJD2 Remix)" from The Conspiracy (2003)
- Cage – "Weather People" from Weatherproof (2003)
- Nightmares on Wax – "70s 80s (RJD2 Remix)" (2003)
- Elbow – "Fugitive Motel (RJD2 Mix)" (2003)
- The High & Mighty- "Incorporate Anthem" from The Highlight Zone (2003)
- Tame One – "Up 2 No Good Again" from When Rappers Attack (2003)
- CunninLynguists – "Seasons" from SouthernUnderground (2003)
- Diverse – "Certified"; "Uprock"; "Big Game"; "Explosive" + "Under the Hammer" from One A.M. (2003)
- Aceyalone – "Lost Your Mind" + "Moonlit Skies" from Love & Hate (2003)
- J-Walk - "Another Lover (RJD2 Remix)" (2003)
- Babbletron – "The Clock Song" from Mechanical Royalty (2003)
- Vast Aire – "9 Lashes (When Michael Smacks Lucifer)" from Look Mom... No Hands (2004)
- Leak Bros – "Gimmesumdeath" from Waterworld (2004)
- Hikaru Utada – "Devil Inside (RJD2 Remix)" (2004)
- Unkle - "Reign (RJD2 Vocal Remix)" (2004)
- Leela James – "Music (RJD2 Remix)" (2005)
- Cage – "Shoot Frank" from Hell's Winter (2005)
- Astrud Gilberto – "The Gentle Rain (RJD2 Remix)" from Verve Remixed 3 (2005)
- The Go! Team – "Huddle Formation (RJD2 Remix)" from Ladyflash Remixes (2006)
- Pigeon John – "The Last Sunshine" from And the Summertime Pool Party (2006)
- Cool Calm Pete – "Black Friday" from Lost (2006)
- Fall Out Boy - "Dance, Dance (Remix)" (2006)
- Aceyalone – "Never Come Back"; "Angelina Valintina" + "Impact" from Grand Imperial (2006)
- Jack Peñate – "Learning Lines" from Matinée (2007)
- Little Brother - "Best Kept Secret" (2007)
- Yo La Tengo – "Here to Fall (RJD2 Remix)" from Here to Fall: Remixes (2010)
- J-Live – "Great Expectations" from S.P.T.A. (2011)
- CunninLynguists – "The Format" from Strange Journey Volume Three (2014)
- Son Little – "Cross My Heart (RJD2 Remix)" from Things I Forgot (2014)
- Tycho – "Apogee (RJD2 Remix)" from Awake Remixes (2016)
- Homeboy Sandman – "Gumshoe" from Kindness for Weakness (2016)
