= 8 Million Stories =

Studio album by Soul Position
- Released: October 7, 2003
- Genre: Hip-hop
- Length: 68:01
- Labels: Fat Beats, Rhymesayers Entertainment
- Producer: RJD2

Soul Position chronology
Unlimited EP (2002)	8 Million Stories (2003)	Things Go Better with RJ and AL (2006)

Singles from 8 Million Stories
- 1. "Jerry Springer Episode" Released: 2003; 2. "Inhale / Right Place, Wrong Time" Released: 2004

Professional ratings
Aggregate scores
Source	Rating
Metacritic	82/100
Review scores
Source	Rating
AllMusic	3.5/5 stars
The A.V. Club	favorable
Dusted Magazine	mixed
Pitchfork	7.5/10
PopMatters	favorable
Prefix	8.0/10
RapReviews.com	10/10
Splendid Magazine	mixed
Stylus Magazine	B−

8 Million Stories is the first studio album by American hip-hop duo Soul Position. It was released on Fat Beats Records under license from Rhymesayers Entertainment on October 7, 2003. It peaked at number 91 on the Billboard Top R&B/Hip-Hop Albums chart.

== Critical reception ==
At Metacritic, which assigns a weighted average score out of 100 to reviews from mainstream critics, the album received an average score of 82% based on 8 reviews, indicating "universal acclaim".

Rollie Pemberton of Pitchfork gave the album a 7.5 out of 10, saying, "it's obvious that this amalgam between one of the most promising rappers in the underground and the most in-demand producer in the industry is a winning combination." Dominic Umile of PopMatters said, "Soul Position's debut LP serves as a sturdy platform for the team's individual talents while being a credible portrait of their union."

== Track listing ==
No.	Title	Length
1.	"Intro"	2:00
2.	"Printmatic"	3:46
3.	"Inhale"	3:23
4.	"The Jerry Springer Episode"	5:21
5.	"Candyland Part 1"	1:19
6.	"Just Think"	5:24
7.	"Fuckajob"	3:58
8.	"Look of Pain"	4:12
9.	"Survival" (featuring Greenhouse Effect)	4:24
10.	"Candyland Part 2"	1:35
11.	"Share This"	5:37
12.	"Run"	3:58
13.	"Right Place, Wrong Time"	4:11
14.	"Candyland Part 3"	1:06
15.	"No Excuse for Lovin"	5:04
16.	"1 Love"	12:43
17.	"Still Listening" (featuring Copywrite and Jakki da Motamouth)

== Charts ==
Chart	Peak position
US Top R&B/Hip-Hop Albums (Billboard)	91
