= More Is Than Isn't =

Studio album by RJD2
- Released: October 8, 2013
- Genre: Hip-hop; electronica
- Length: 59:28
- Label: RJ's Electrical Connections
- Producer: RJD2

RJD2 chronology
The Colossus (2010)	More Is Than Isn't (2013)	Dame Fortune (2016)

More Is Than Isn't is the fifth studio album by RJD2. It was released on RJ's Electrical Connections on October 8, 2013. It peaked at number 39 on the Billboard Top R&B/Hip-Hop Albums chart, as well as number 10 on the Heatseekers Albums chart.

== Critical reception ==
Professional ratings
Aggregate scores
Source	Rating
Metacritic	72/100
Review scores
Source	Rating
AllMusic	3.5/5 stars
Consequence of Sound	C+
Exclaim!	5/10
Exclaim!	6/10
Pitchfork	7.7/10
PopMatters	7/10 stars

At Metacritic, which assigns a weighted average score out of 100 to reviews from mainstream critics, the album received an average score of 72, based on 8 reviews, indicating "generally favorable reviews".

David Jeffries of AllMusic gave the album 3.5 stars out of 5, saying, "even if More Is Than Isn't doesn't flow as well as his previous efforts, this everything-and-the-kitchen-sink experience is dazzling, always leaving the listener wondering what might come next." Nate Patrin of Pitchfork gave the album a 7.7 out of 10, saying: "While the vocal tracks are well-realized, this is the first album RJ's made in a long time that actually feels like it's satisfied to say most of what it has to say in instrumental form."

Cleveland Scene placed it at number 9 on the "Top 10 Albums and Singles You Didn't Hear in 2013" list.

== Track listing ==
No.	Title	Writer(s)	Length
1.	"Suite 1"	Ramble Krohn	2:01
2.	"Temperamental" (featuring Phonte Coleman)	Krohn; Phonte Coleman	3:27
3.	"Behold, Numbers!"	Krohn	4:33
4.	"Her Majesty's Socialist Request"	Krohn	3:45
5.	"A Lot of Night Ahead of You"	Krohn	2:56
6.	"Bathwater" (featuring P. Blackk)	Krohn; Pedro Fequiere Jr.	3:06
7.	"Milk Tooth"	Krohn	3:56
8.	"Suite 2"	Krohn	1:48
9.	"Winter Isn't Coming"	Krohn	4:13
10.	"See You Leave" (featuring STS and Khari Mateen)	Krohn; Khari Mateen; STS	4:59
11.	"Got There, Sugar?"	Krohn	4:29
12.	"Love and Go" (featuring Aaron Livingston)	Krohn; Aaron Livingston	4:30
13.	"Descended from Myth"	Krohn	6:14
14.	"Dirty Hands"	Krohn	3:48
15.	"It All Came to Me in a Dream" (featuring Blueprint)	Krohn; Al Shepard	3:17
16.	"Suite 3"	Krohn	2:26

== Charts ==
Chart	Peak position
US Top R&B/Hip-Hop Albums (Billboard)	39
US Heatseekers Albums (Billboard)	10
