= Son Little (album) =

Studio album by Son Little
- Released: October 16, 2015
- Genres: Soul, blues
- Length: 42:54
- Label: Anti-
- Producer: Son Little

Son Little chronology
Things I Forgot (2014)	Son Little (2015)	New Magic (2017)

Son Little is the first studio album by American soul musician Son Little. It was released on Anti- on October 16, 2015. It is a follow-up to his 2014 EP, Things I Forgot.

== Reception ==
Professional ratings
Aggregate scores
Source	Rating
Metacritic	75/100
Review scores
Source	Rating
AllMusic	4/5 stars
NPR	favorable
PopMatters	7/10 stars
The Sydney Morning Herald	4/5 stars

At Metacritic, which assigns a weighted average score out of 100 to reviews from mainstream critics, the album received an average score of 75% based on 5 reviews, indicating "generally favorable reviews".

Mark Deming of AllMusic said: "Sometimes troubling, frequently joyous, and always articulate and thoroughly individual, Son Little's cross-genre shape-shifting reveals more compelling nuances with each listen, and this is one of the most interesting and rewarding debuts of 2015."

American Songwriter placed "Go Blue Blood Red" at number 46 on its list of the "Top 50 Songs of 2015".

== Track listing ==
No.	Title	Length
1.	"I'm Gone"	2:57
2.	"Nice Dreams"	4:11
3.	"Your Love Will Blow Me Away When My Heart Aches"	3:03
4.	"Toes"	3:43
5.	"Carbon"	2:36
6.	"Lay Down"	3:48
7.	"Doctor's In"	2:56
8.	"O Mother"	3:12
9.	"Go Blue Blood Red"	3:58
10.	"Loser Blues"	4:10
11.	"The River"	4:34
12.	"About a Flood"	3:47

Deluxe edition bonus tracks
No.	Title	Length
13.	"Wanted To"	2:31
14.	"Cross My Heart"	3:55
15.	"Real Goodbye"	2:56
