= The Horror =

EP by RJD2
- Released: February 11, 2003
- Genre: Hip-hop; electronic
- Length: 43:28
- Label: Definitive Jux; RJ's Electrical Connections
- Producer: RJD2

RJD2 chronology
Deadringer (2002)	The Horror (2003)	Since We Last Spoke (2004)

Singles from The Horror
- 1. "The Horror" / "Final Frontier (Remix)" Released: 2003; 2. "Sell the World" / "Ghostwriter (Remix)" Released: 2003

The Horror is an EP by RJD2. It was released on Definitive Jux on February 11, 2003.

The EP peaked at number 45 on the Billboard Heatseekers Albums chart, as well as number 32 on the Independent Albums chart.

== Critical reception ==
Professional ratings
Review scores
Source	Rating
AllMusic	3/5 stars
Pitchfork	7.3/10

Scott Hreha of Pitchfork praised The Horror as "a solid reiteration of Rj's remarkable talent." Sara Jayne Crow of XLR8R described the EP as "superlatively inhuman in its quality, much like RJD2's production skills". Nathan Rabin of The A.V. Club said: "Ten tracks of decaying beauty and dirty elegance, The Horror reaffirms RJD2's standing as one of the most gifted and original producers in underground hip-hop." PopMatters critic Dave Hamilton highlighted the instrumental tracks, which he felt "perfectly capture why Deadringer ended up on so many 'best of 2002' lists".

== Track listing ==
No.	Title	Length
1.	"The Horror"	4:10
2.	"Ghostwriter (Remix)"	5:42
3.	"Final Frontier (Remix)" (featuring Aesop Rock, Blueprint, Murs and Vast Aire)	4:12
4.	"Bus Stop Bitties"	4:24
5.	"Good Times Roll Pt. 1"	2:57
6.	"Sell the World"	4:29
7.	"June (Remix)" (featuring Copywrite)	4:23
8.	"Counseling (Instrumental)"	4:00
9.	"Final Frontier (Instrumental)"	4:43
10.	"F.H.H. (Instrumental)"	4:24
Total length:		43:28

2009 reissue edition bonus tracks
No.	Title	Length
11.	"The Sleepaway"	3:37
12.	"When It Wobbles"	4:10
Total length:		51:11

The second disc CD-ROM includes the following:

- "Exclusive Live Footage: At Beta Lounge SF and Bowery Ballroom NYC (with El-P, Murs, and Aesop Rock)"
- "The Horror: Animated"
- "Sneak Peak: The Making of 'The Horror' Music Video"
- "Interactive Photo Gallery"

== Personnel ==
Credits adapted from liner notes.

- RJD2 – production
- Ernie Stackmore – mixing
- Nasa – mixing
- Emily Lazar – mastering
- Sarah Register – mastering assistance
- Amaechi Uzoigwe – executive production
- Ese – project coordination
- B. Smith – design, layout
- Cory Piehowicz – photography

== Charts ==
Chart (2003)	Peak position
US Heatseekers Albums (Billboard)	45
US Independent Albums (Billboard)	32
