= The Colossus (album) =

Studio album by RJD2
- Released: January 19, 2010
- Genre: Hip-hop; electronica; alternative rock
- Length: 54:16
- Label: RJ's Electrical Connections
- Producer: RJD2

RJD2 chronology
The Third Hand (2007)	The Colossus (2010)	More Is Than Isn't (2013)

The Colossus is the fourth studio album by RJD2. It was released on RJ's Electrical Connections on January 19, 2010. It peaked at number 30 on the Billboard Top R&B/Hip-Hop Albums chart, number 4 on the Heatseekers Albums chart, and number 25 on the Independent Albums chart.

== Critical reception ==
Professional ratings
Aggregate scores
Source	Rating
Metacritic	63/100
Review scores
Source	Rating
AllMusic	4/5 stars
The A.V. Club	D−
Exclaim!	mixed
Now	3/5 stars
The Phoenix	1.5/4 stars
Pitchfork	6.8/10
PopMatters	6/10 stars
Resident Advisor	1.0/5
Spin	8/10
Tiny Mix Tapes	3/5 stars

At Metacritic, which assigns a weighted average score out of 100 to reviews from mainstream critics, the album received an average score of 63, based on 16 reviews, indicating "generally favorable reviews".

Patrick Sisson of Pitchfork gave the album a 6.8 out of 10, saying, "Rjd2 showcases a grasp of mood and a talent for arranging on The Colossus." Mike Schiller of PopMatters gave the album 6 stars out of 10, calling it "a work by an artist who is maturing rather than lashing out."

== Track listing ==
No.	Title	Length
1.	"Let There Be Horns"	4:09
2.	"Games You Can Win" (featuring Kenna)	5:26
3.	"Giant Squid"	4:08
4.	"Salud 2"	0:49
5.	"The Glow"	4:26
6.	"A Spaceship for Now"	3:15
7.	"The Shining Path" (featuring Phonte Coleman)	4:08
8.	"Crumbs Off the Table" (featuring Aaron Livingston)	4:04
9.	"A Son's Cycle" (featuring The Catalyst, Illogic, and NP)	4:05
10.	"Tin Flower"	3:48
11.	"Small Plans"	4:32
12.	"Gypsy Caravan"	2:13
13.	"The Stranger"	3:59
14.	"Walk with Me"	5:24
Total length:		54:16

iTunes edition bonus track
No.	Title	Length
15.	"Games You Can Win (Nicolay Remix)" (featuring Kenna)	5:03
Total length:		59:19

== Charts ==
Chart	Peak position
US Top R&B/Hip-Hop Albums (Billboard)	30
US Heatseekers Albums (Billboard)	4
US Independent Albums (Billboard)	25
