= Deadringer (album) =

Studio album by RJD2
- Released: July 23, 2002
- Genre: Instrumental hip-hop
- Length: 67:00
- Label: Definitive Jux
- Producer: RJD2

RJD2 chronology
Deadringer (2002)	The Horror EP (2003)

Singles from Deadringer
- 1. "June" / "The Proxy" Released: 2001; 2. "Here's What's Left" Released: 2002; 3. "The Horror" / "Final Frontier (Remix)" Released: 2003

Deadringer is the debut studio album by RJD2. It was released on Definitive Jux on July 23, 2002. It features vocal contributions from Blueprint, Jakki da Motamouth, and Copywrite. Some editions include a hidden song on the last track, titled "Here's What's Left." The album was reissued in 2009 with two additional tracks.

"Ghostwriter" was featured in advertisements for Washington State Lottery and Wells Fargo, as well as in the film Wimbledon.

== Critical reception ==
Professional ratings
Review scores
Source	Rating
AllMusic	4.5/5 stars
The Boston Phoenix	3/4 stars
HipHopDX	4.5/5
Muzik	4/5 stars
NME	8/10
Pitchfork	8.8/10
Rolling Stone	3/5 stars
Spin	9/10
Stylus Magazine	B+
Tiny Mix Tapes	4/5

Noel Dix of Exclaim! gave Deadringer a favorable review and commented that the album "plays very much like the soundtrack to a motion picture". Sam Chennault of Pitchfork called it "an essential purchase for any fan of instrumental hip-hop". Doug Levy of CMJ New Music Report felt that "DJ Shadow may have started the instrumental hip-hop revolution, but RJD2 is here to make the coup a reality".

Chris Ryan of Spin wrote that RJD2 "goes spelunking for everything from flamenco and pastoral folk to the kind of raw funk breaks that most groove merchants only dream of uncovering". Tony Van Groningen of Stylus Magazine said that "RJD2 effortlessly changes directions and adds unexpected elements to the mix that do more to perfect the songs than to muddle them up".

Spin placed Deadringer at number 31 on its year-end list of the best albums of 2002. Kludge placed it at number three on its list of the year's best albums. In 2015, Fact placed it at number 28 on its "100 Best Indie Hip-Hop Records of All Time" list.

== Track listing ==
No.	Title	Length
1.	"The Horror"	4:11
2.	"Salud"	0:38
3.	"Smoke & Mirrors"	4:26
4.	"Good Times Roll Pt.2"	4:57
5.	"Final Frontier" (featuring Blueprint)	4:25
6.	"Ghostwriter"	5:17
7.	"Cut Out to FL"	3:42
8.	"F.H.H." (featuring Jakki da Motamouth)	4:31
9.	"Shot in the Dark"	1:21
10.	"Chicken-Bone Circuit"	3:54
11.	"The Proxy"	2:14
12.	"2 More Dead"	5:17
13.	"Take the Picture Off"	1:02
14.	"Silver Fox"	3:31
15.	"June" (featuring Copywrite)	6:03
16.	"Work" (ends at 3:45, with hidden track "Here's What's Left" (5:58) starting at 5:40)"	11:39

2009 reissue edition bonus tracks (CD and digital only):
No.	Title	Length
17.	"Thine Planetarium"	9:21
18.	"Before Or Since"	3:22

Notes:

- Bonus track "Here's What's Left" does not appear on some versions, including vinyl releases and the 2009 reissue.
- The 2009 reissue bonus tracks originally appeared on the 2002 UK version of the album.

== Charts ==
Chart (2002)	Peak position
French Albums (SNEP)	63
