= Cityfolk =

2026 studio album by Son Little

Studio album by Son Little
- Released: March 20, 2026
- Studio: Sun Drop Sound
- Genre: Soul
- Length: 41:50
- Label: Anti-

Son Little chronology
| Like Neptune (2022) | Cityfolk (2026) |

Cityfolk is the fifth studio album by American soul musician Son Little. It was released on Anti- on March 20, 2026. The album serves as a follow-up to his 2022 album, Like Neptune.

== Recording ==
Cityfolk was recorded at Sun Drop Sound in Florence, Alabama and Son Little's home studio. The album was produced by Son Little and Ben Tanner, a member of Alabama Shakes. The album's songs originated from voice note demos built around acoustic guitar ideas. The recording process involved collaboration between Little and Tanner to develop the arrangements and instrumentation for the album. Shoals Music Makers provided funding and the recording studio for the album.

== Release ==
Cityfolk was released on March 20, 2026, in multiple physical formats, including CD, standard vinyl, and an indie-exclusive green vinyl edition. The album was preceded by the singles "In Orbit" on November 12, 2025, "Be Better" on January 14, 2026, "Cherry" on February 11, 2026, and "Whip The Wind" on March 18, 2026.

The album release was followed by a world tour in 2026.

== Track listing ==
| No. | Title | Length |
|---|---|---|
| 1 | "Rabbit" | 2:55 |
| 2 | "Whip The Wind" | 4:23 |
| 3 | "Let's Get Involved" | 2:34 |
| 4 | "It's Your World" | 3:45 |
| 5 | "Cherry" | 4:26 |
| 6 | "Bottomless" | 4:35 |
| 7 | "Be Better" | 3:59 |
| 8 | "The Valley" | 3:32 |
| 9 | "In Orbit" | 2:40 |
| 10 | "Paper Children" | 3:48 |
| 11 | "Breathe" | 5:13 |
| Total | | 41:50 |

== Personnel ==
=== Musicians ===
- Son Little – vocals on all tracks; various instruments including guitars, bass, piano, synthesizers, percussion, banjo, Mellotron, clavinet, drum programming
- Brandon Combs – drums, percussion
- Peter Randall – upright bass
- Aaron Steele – synthesizer
- Nick Lobel – baritone guitar
- Lizzie No – harp, background vocals
- Kam Franklin – vocals
- Ben Tanner – piano, organ, glockenspiel, sitar

=== Production ===
- Son Little – production, engineering
- Ben Tanner – production, mixing, engineering
- Austin Motlow – assistant engineering

=== Recording locations ===
- Sun Drop Sound (Florence, Alabama)
- Red River Recordings
