= The Third Hand =

Studio album by RJD2
- Released: March 6, 2007
- Genre: Hip-hop; electronic; rock; pop
- Length: 47:05
- Label: XL Recordings
- Producer: RJD2

RJD2 chronology
Magnificent City (2006)	The Third Hand (2007)	The Colossus (2010)

Singles from The Third Hand
- 1. "You Never Had It So Good" Released: 2007; 2. "Work It Out" Released: 2007

The Third Hand is the third studio album by RJD2. It was released on XL Records on March 6, 2007. It peaked at number 190 on the Billboard 200 chart, number 5 on the Heatseekers Albums chart, and number 23 on the Independent Albums chart. The Third Hand Instrumentals, an instrumental version of the album, was also released in 2007.

== Critical reception ==
Professional ratings
Aggregate scores
Source	Rating
Metacritic	60/100
Review scores
Source	Rating
AllMusic	3.5/5 stars
The A.V. Club	B−
Billboard	mixed
MusicOMH	4/5 stars
NME	5/10
Pitchfork	3.7/10
PopMatters	5/10 stars
Spin	mixed
Stylus Magazine	C+

At Metacritic, which assigns a weighted average score out of 100 to reviews from mainstream critics, the album received an average score of 60, based on 28 reviews, indicating "mixed or average reviews".

Noel Murray of The A.V. Club gave the album a grade of B−, saying: "About half of The Third Hand is given over to dub exercises and soundtrack-ready soundscapes, while the other half pushes fairly conventional alt-pop, heavy on the Beatles-esque flourishes." Dave Heaton of PopMatters gave the album 5 stars out of 10, saying: "You may have to listen past a few layers to be satisfied, but there is a level of satisfaction to be found."

== Track listing ==
No.	Title	Length
1.	"Intro"	1:00
2.	"You Never Had It So Good"	4:04
3.	"Have Mercy"	3:18
4.	"Reality"	3:01
5.	"Work It Out"	3:26
6.	"Laws of the Gods"	2:10
7.	"Get It"	3:30
8.	"Someday"	1:22
9.	"The Bad Penny"	4:04
10.	"Beyond the Beyond"	3:57
11.	"Sweet Piece"	4:00
12.	"Rules for Normal Living"	4:03
13.	"Paper Bubbles"	2:49
14.	"Just When"	3:28
15.	"The Evening Gospel"	2:53
Total length:		47:05

iTunes edition bonus tracks
No.	Title	Length
16.	"The Past Time"	9:22
17.	"The Wilderness"	3:42
Total length:		60:09

== Charts ==
Chart	Peak position
US Billboard 200	190
US Heatseekers Albums (Billboard)	5
US Independent Albums (Billboard)	23
