= Kev Brown =

American music producer

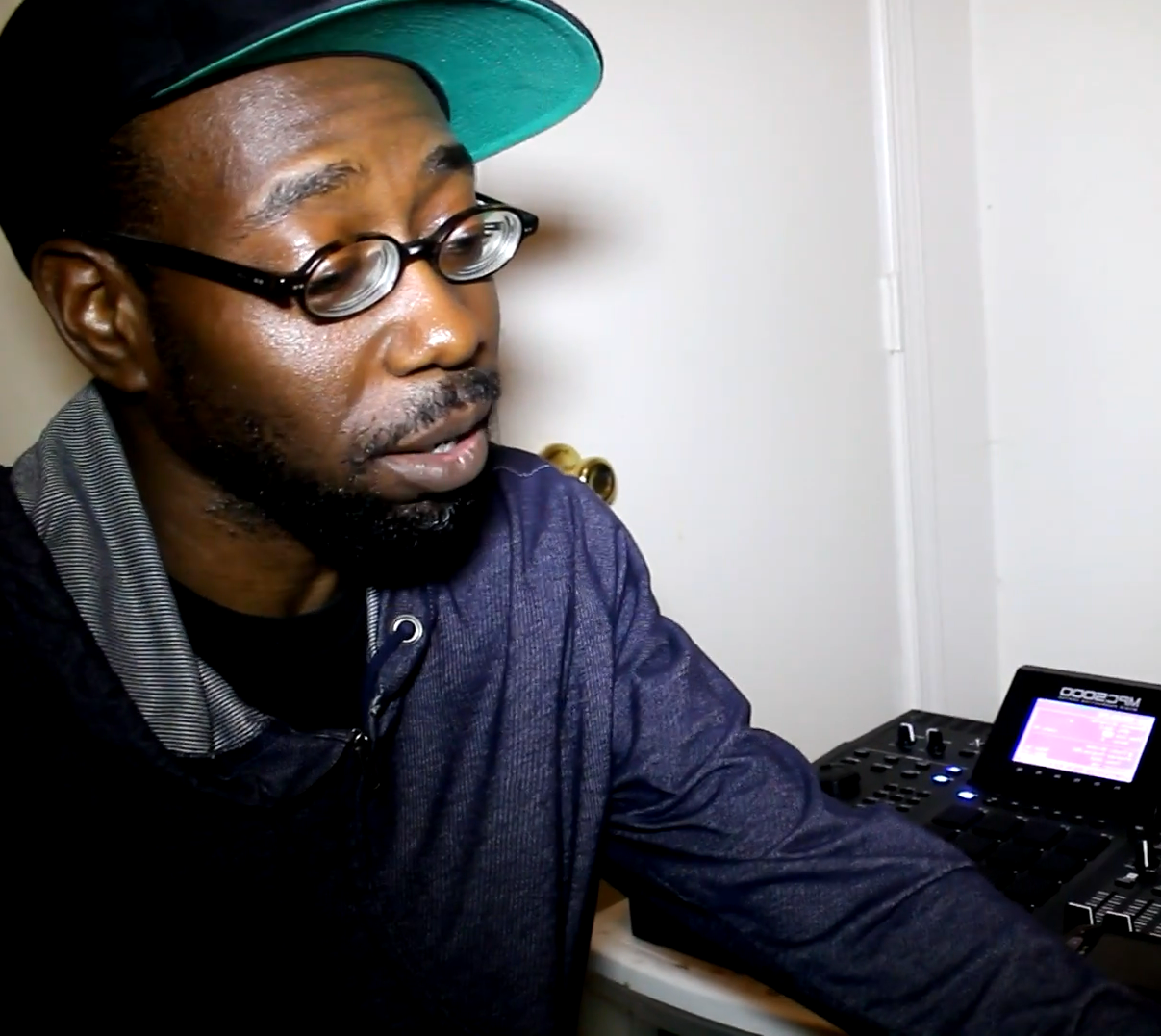
- Kev Brown at his home studio.

Background information
- Origin: Landover, Maryland, U.S.
- Genre: Hip hop

Kev Brown (born 1979 in Landover, Maryland) is an American rapper and music producer. He is the founding member of the former Low Budget Crew.

== Life and career ==
Brown made his recording debut in 2001, appearing alongside Grap Luva on a track from Marley Marl's album Re-Entry. Later that year, he contributed the track "Special" to De La Soul's album AOI: Bionix. In 2002, Brown became part of DJ Jazzy Jeff's production collective A Touch of Jazz, contributing seven productions to Jeff's album The Magnificent.

In 2005, Brown released his debut solo album, I Do What I Do, through Up Above Records. The album, which Brown produced largely himself, included the single "Life's a Gamble". In 2011, he recorded South Africa Dedication, a two-track EP created for the Party People Reunion Tour in Cape Town and Johannesburg; the project was later released on vinyl by Redefinition Records. In 2013, he released Brazil Dedication, an instrumental project inspired by an extended stay in Brazil, where he performed, produced music and worked with local musicians.

After a lengthy gap between solo rap albums, Brown released Homework on Redefinition Records in 2018. The album contains 27 main tracks, with additional bonus tracks on some editions. In August 2026, Brown was credited as a co-producer on "SPAZZZ", a track by Busta Rhymes and J Dilla from Dillagence II, alongside Black Milk.

== Discography (selection) ==
=== Albums ===
- I Do What I Do (2005, Up Above Records)
- LMNO & Kev Brown - Selective Hearing (2008, Up Above Records)
- Kaimbr & Kev Brown - The Alexander Green Project (2011, Redefinition Records)
- Random Joints (2012, Low Budget Records)
- Homework (2018, Redefinition Records)

=== As producer ===
- Marley Marl feat. Kev Brown & Grap Luva - What Ruling Means (2001, BBE), on Re-Entry
- De La Soul - Special (2001, Tommy Boy Records), on AOI: Bionix
- DJ Jazzy Jeff - The Magnificent (2002, Rapster Records, BBE), 7 album tracks
- Biz Markie - Weekend Warrior (2003, BizMont Entertainment, Tommy Boy Records), Get Down and Games
- Busta Rhymes, J Dilla - Spazzz (2026, The Conglomerate Inc.), on Dillagence II
