= The Hear After =

Studio album by J-Live
- Released: July 19, 2005
- Genre: Hip-hop
- Length: 52:01
- Label: Penalty Recordings
- Producers: J-Live, Oddisee, Hezekiah, Tony Whitfield, Probe DMS, Floyd the Locsmif, James Poyser, The Fire Dept.

J-Live chronology
All of the Above (2002)	The Hear After (2005)	Then What Happened? (2008)

Singles from The Hear After
- 1. "Harder" / "Do My Thing" Released: 2005

The Hear After is the third studio album by American hip-hop artist J-Live. It was released on Penalty Recordings on July 19, 2005.

== Critical reception ==
Professional ratings
Review scores
Source	Rating
The A.V. Club	favorable
The Guardian	favorable
HipHopDX	3.0/5
Okayplayer	2.5/5 stars
Pitchfork	6.5/10
PopMatters	7/10 stars

Nathan Rabin of The A.V. Club gave the album a favorable review, saying: "Gangsta rappers might like to think of their songs as dispatches from war zones, but The Hear After is more like a nice conversation with an old friend following a long separation."

== Track listing ==
No.	Title	Producer(s)	Length
1.	"Here" (featuring Soulive)	J-Live	3:29
2.	"Aaw Yeah"	Oddisee	2:50
3.	"Fire Water"	Hezekiah, Tony Whitfield	3:38
4.	"Do My Thing" (featuring Cvees)	Probe DMS	4:36
5.	"Whoever"	J-Live	4:14
6.	"The Sidewalks"	J-Live	4:16
7.	"Audio Visual"	Floyd the Locsmif	4:22
8.	"Brooklyn Public Part 1"	J-Live	4:06
9.	"Listening" (featuring Kola Rock)	J-Live, James Poyser	5:07
10.	"Harder"	The Fire Dept.	4:34
11.	"Coming Home" (featuring Dwele)	J-Live	3:39
12.	"Weather the Storm"	J-Live	3:39
13.	"After"	J-Live	3:31
Total length:			52:01

Japanese edition bonus tracks
No.	Title	Length
14.	"Super Seniors"	2:56
15.	"Shake"	3:55
Total length:		58:52
