= Soul Position =

American hip-hop group

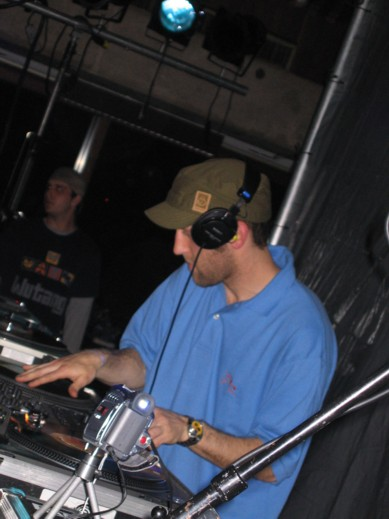
- Live concert at Haverford College in 2005

Background information
- Origin: Columbus, Ohio, U.S.
- Genre: Alternative hip-hop
- Years active: 2002–2006
- Label: Rhymesayers Entertainment
- Members: Blueprint; RJD2

Soul Position is an American alternative hip-hop duo hailing from Columbus, Ohio. It consists of DJ/producer RJD2 and rapper Blueprint. The duo has released two albums and one EP on Rhymesayers Entertainment.

== Discography ==
=== Albums ===
- 8 Million Stories (2003)
- Things Go Better with RJ and AL (2006)

=== EPs ===
- Unlimited EP (2002)

=== Singles ===
- "The Jerry Springer Episode" b/w "Share This" (2003)
- "Inhale" b/w "Inhale Remix" & "Right Place, Wrong Time" (2004)
- "Hand-Me Downs" b/w "Blame It on the Jager" (2006)
- "The Good Life" (as RJD2 Feat. Blueprint) (2012)

=== Mixtapes ===
- Mixtapes Go Better with RJ and AL (2006)
