= I Predict a Riot (album) =

Studio album by Hezekiah
- Released: September 18, 2007
- Genre: Hip hop
- Length: 53:11
- Label: Rawkus Records; Soulspazm Records
- Producer: Oddisee; Hezekiah; Rick Tate; Anthony Accurate; Vegan Pork Grind; Fred Kenny; Aaron Livingston; Tony Whitfield

Hezekiah chronology
Hurry Up & Wait (2005)	I Predict a Riot (2007)	Conscious Porn (2010)

I Predict a Riot is the second studio album by American hip hop musician Hezekiah. It was released on Rawkus Records and Soulspazm Records on September 18, 2007. It was the last album released on Rawkus Records, as the label would fold the same year. It features guest appearances from Freeway, Bilal, and Jaguar Wright.

== Critical reception ==
Professional ratings
Review scores
Source	Rating
AllHipHop	favorable
AllMusic	4/5 stars
BBC	favorable
Exclaim!	favorable
HipHopDX	3.5/5
The Skinny	4/5 stars
XLR8R	favorable

Marisa Brown of AllMusic said, "[Hezekiah's] rhymes and beats are more focused, clearer, and more intelligent than a lot of what else is out there, and he writes well-done, backpacker-friendly songs that are also catchy and memorable." James Mayo of XLR8R described the album as "a record of timeless soul-infused hip-hop." Kevin Jones of Exclaim! commented that "While his flow may feel a little loose at times, Hezekiah surrounds himself with enough vocal heat (Freeway, most notably) to pad out this well-rounded collection of neo-soul survivalist hip-hop." Roman Cooper of HipHopDX stated, "He possesses a rare combination of lyricism, charisma and passion on the mic, backed by an equally impressive musical backdrop."

PopMatters placed it at number 81 on the "101 Hip-Hop Albums of 2007" list.

== Track listing ==
No.	Title	Producer(s)	Length
1.	"The Beginning" (featuring Muhsinah)	Oddisee	1:47
2.	"Wild & Wreckless"	Hezekiah; Rick Tate	3:05
3.	"If One Falls" (featuring Eleon)	Hezekiah	3:22
4.	"That Filling" (featuring Freeway)	Hezekiah	4:00
5.	"Looking Up" (featuring Bilal)	Anthony Accurate	4:17
6.	"Single Now"	Hezekiah	3:22
7.	"Let's Get Involved" (featuring Jamal)	Hezekiah	4:39
8.	"Bombs Over Here"	Vegan Pork Grind	3:40
9.	"Definition of a Bitch (Lude)"		0:21
10.	"I See Yaw" (featuring Jaguar Wright)	Hezekiah; Fred Kenny	3:57
11.	"I.P.A.R. (Lude)"		0:19
12.	"Moments in Sometime" (featuring Aaron Livingston)	Hezekiah; Aaron Livingston	4:22
13.	"I Predict a Riot" (featuring Keziah and E. Shon Burgundy)	Hezekiah	3:39
14.	"Freak (Lude)"		0:42
15.	"Gotta Love It" (featuring Tarentz Moreese)	Hezekiah	4:11
16.	"Ghetto People" (featuring Richard Raw, Kamachi, and State Store)	Hezekiah	5:27
17.	"Afro (Lude)"	Hezekiah; Tony Whitfield	1:29
18.	"Muhsinah Outro"		0:28
Total length:			53:11
