= Since We Last Spoke =

Studio album by RJD2
- Released: May 18, 2004
- Genres: Hip-hop; instrumental hip-hop
- Length: 46:26
- Label: Definitive Jux
- Producer: RJD2

RJD2 chronology
The Horror (2003)	Since We Last Spoke (2004)	Magnificent City (2006)

Singles from Since We Last Spoke
- 1. "1976" Released: 2004; 2. "Through the Walls" Released: 2004; 3. "Exotic Talk" Released: 2004

Since We Last Spoke is the second studio album by American musician RJD2. It was released on Definitive Jux in 2004.

Since We Last Spoke peaked at number 94 on the UK Albums Chart, as well as number 128 on the Billboard 200 chart. It includes "Exotic Talk", which peaked at number 93 on the UK Singles Chart.

== Critical reception ==
Professional ratings
Aggregate scores
Source	Rating
Metacritic	80/100
Review scores
Source	Rating
AllMusic	3/5 stars
Alternative Press	4/5
Blender	4/5 stars
The Boston Phoenix	3/4 stars
Entertainment Weekly	A−
Pitchfork	7.0/10
Q	4/5 stars
Resident Advisor	4.0/5
Rolling Stone	3/5 stars
Spin	A−

At Metacritic, which assigns a weighted average score out of 100 to reviews from mainstream critics, the album received an average score of 80, based on 21 reviews, indicating "generally favorable reviews".

Nathan Rabin of The A.V. Club gave the album a favorable review, saying, "Since We Last Spoke finds RJD2 sounding like some blessed creature who's able to tune in every radio station in the world, past and present, and mix them together into a cohesive whole." He added: "For all its adventurousness and genre-mashing, the album has a surprising pop sensibility." Dave Heaton of PopMatters concluded, "If you think of hip-hop as a musically conservative genre (as it's often called) or if you consider most instrumental hip-hop to be predictable or even dull, chances are good that Since We Last Spoke will do more than just surprise you, it'll blow your world apart". David Drake of Stylus Magazine wrote that RJD2 had utilized the "postmodern sampling techniques of hip-hop to reconstruct 70s AM rock radio" and produced "not just a great hip-hop album, but also one of the best rock albums of the year".

Spin placed it at number 37 on its list of the best albums of 2004.

== Track listing ==
No.	Title	Length
1.	"Since We Last Spoke"	4:14
2.	"Exotic Talk"	3:43
3.	"1976"	2:27
4.	"Ring Finger"	3:47
5.	"Making Days Longer"	4:36
6.	"Someone's Second Kiss"	4:28
7.	"To All of You"	5:09
8.	"Clean Living"	4:29
9.	"Iced Lightning"	4:06
10.	"Intro"	1:10
11.	"Through the Walls"	3:27
12.	"One Day"	4:50
Total length:		46:26

UK edition bonus tracks
No.	Title	Length
13.	"De L'Alouette"	3:11
14.	"Holy Toledo"	4:09
Total length:		53:22

== Charts ==
Chart (2004)	Peak position
French Albums (SNEP)	76
UK Albums (Official Charts)	94
UK Independent Albums (Official Charts)	7
US Billboard 200	128
US Heatseekers Albums (Billboard)	3
US Independent Albums (Billboard)	6
US Top R&B/Hip-Hop Albums (Billboard)	87
