= The Return of the Magnificent =

2nd studio album by DJ Jazzy Jeff

Studio album by DJ Jazzy Jeff
- Released: May 8, 2007
- Genre: Hip-hop
- Length: 78:38
- Label: BBE; Rapster
- Producer: DJ Jazzy Jeff

DJ Jazzy Jeff chronology
The Magnificent (2002)	The Return of the Magnificent (2007)

Professional ratings
Review scores
Source	Rating
AllHipHop	favorable
AllMusic	4/5 stars
HipHopDX	3.5/5
PopMatters	7/10
RapReviews	8/10
The Skinny	3/5 stars
URB	4/5 stars
XLR8R	favorable
XXL	XL

The Return of the Magnificent is the second studio album by DJ Jazzy Jeff. It was released via BBE and Rapster Records in 2007. It is the official follow-up to The Magnificent (2002). It includes guest appearances from CL Smooth, Big Daddy Kane, Jean Grae, J-Live, Twone Gabs, and Kel Spencer. The album cover is based on the Deodato 2 cover by Eumir Deodato.

== Track listing ==
No.	Title	Length
1.	"Hip Hop" (featuring Twone Gabz)	4:27
2.	"Let Me Hear U Clap" (featuring Pos)	3:06
3.	"Run That Back" (featuring Eshon Burgundy and Black Ice)	4:00
4.	"The Definition" (featuring Kel Spencer)	3:35
5.	"Touch Me wit Ur Handz" (featuring Chinah Blac)	5:36
6.	"Jeff n Fess" (featuring Rhymefest)	4:21
7.	"Practice" (featuring J-Live)	4:13
8.	"Supa Jean" (featuring Jean Grae)	5:05
9.	"The Garden" (featuring Big Daddy Kane)	4:00
10.	"She Was So Flyy" (featuring Kardinal Offishall)	4:03
11.	"Hold It Down" (featuring Method Man)	3:14
12.	"All I Know" (featuring CL Smooth)	4:11
13.	"Go See the Doctor 2K7" (featuring Twone Gabz)	4:00
14.	"My Soul Ain't for Sale" (featuring Raheem DeVaughn)	5:11
15.	"Come On" (featuring Dave Ghetto)	5:05
16.	"Brand New Funk 2K7" (featuring Peedi Peedi)	4:04
17.	"Money Can't Buy Me Love" (CD bonus track; featuring Biz Markie)	5:06

== Charts ==
Chart	Peak position
US Top R&B/Hip-Hop Albums (Billboard)	55
US Independent Albums (Billboard)	38
