= Things Go Better with RJ and AL =

Studio album by Soul Position
- Released: April 4, 2006
- Genre: Hip-hop
- Length: 42:28
- Label: Rhymesayers
- Producer: RJD2

Soul Position chronology
8 Million Stories (2003)	Things Go Better with RJ and AL (2006)

Singles from Things Go Better with RJ and AL
- 1. "Hand-Me-Downs / Blame It on the Jäger" Released: 2006

Things Go Better with RJ and AL is the second studio album by American hip hop duo Soul Position. It was released on April 4, 2006 via Rhymesayers Entertainment. In the United States, the album debuted at number 45 on the Billboard Independent Albums chart.

== Critical reception ==
Professional ratings
Aggregate scores
Source	Rating
Metacritic	64/100
Review scores
Source	Rating
AllHipHop	3/5 stars
AllMusic	4/5 stars
Cokemachineglow	60/100%
HipHopDX	4.5/5
Now	4/5 Ns
Pitchfork	6.3/10
PopMatters	4/10
Prefix	6/10
RapReviews	9/10
The Village Voice	(choice cut)

Things Go Better with RJ and AL was met with generally favourable reviews from music critics. At Metacritic, which assigns a normalized rating out of 100 to reviews from mainstream publications, the album received an average score of 64 based on seven reviews.

Steve 'Flash' Juon of RapReviews praised the album, resuming: "to say Things Go Better with RJ and Al is as great as some of their earlier work would be an overstatement, but to say it's a disappointment in any way shape or form would be a colossal lie". Tim Perlich of NOW Magazine wrote: "RJ puts aside his cinematic loops to deliver his roughest and toughest beats, over which Blueprint spits the party and bullshit blues like a man watching his most celebrated contempories fiddle with iced-out jewellery while their country burns before their eyes". Tom Breihan of Pitchfork concluded: "seeming short at 40 minutes, it's a slight album, and it's marred by Blueprint's slavish devotion to his own goofy song-concepts".

In his mixed review for Cokemachineglow, Chet Betz stated: "if Soul Position intended to craft a wholly direct, musically and lyrically and conceptually simplistic piece of positive rap, like a modern day Arrested Development album, then I think they did that well enough, and I guess I don't fully appreciate because I'm too caught up in my own gangly mental schematic of what it is that makes good hip-hop good". Eric Solomon of Prefix wrote: "despite the jovial cover, this album comes off as almost entirely serious, which is all well and good until you hear some of the most misguided pontification ever laid down on a hip-hop track". Justin Cober-Lake of PopMatters concluded: "rather than the careless tracks sounding like harmless asides (even if they didn't make up a fair amount of the album), they come across like an MC wandering".

In 2017, Henry Adaso of ThoughtCo placed "The Cool Thing to Do" at number 99 on the "100 Best Rap Songs of the 2000s" list.

== Track listing ==
All tracks are written by Albert Shepard.

No.	Title	Length
1.	"The Beginning"	0:44
2.	"No Gimmicks"	3:12
3.	"Hand-Me-Downs"	3:17
4.	"The Extra Mile"	3:37
5.	"Blame It on the Jäger"	3:12
6.	"I Need My Minutes"	3:11
7.	"Keep It Hot for Daddy"	3:13
8.	"I'm Free"	2:26
9.	"Keys"	4:18
10.	"The Cool Thing to Do"	3:01
11.	"Priceless"	3:35
12.	"Drugs, Sex, Alcohol, Rock-n-Roll"	4:10
13.	"Things Go Better"	4:32
Total length:		42:28

== Charts ==
Chart (2006)	Peak position
US Independent Albums (Billboard)	45
