= The Magnificent (DJ Jazzy Jeff album) =

Studio album by DJ Jazzy Jeff
- Released: August 20, 2002
- Recorded: 2002
- Genres: Hip-hop, R&B, deep house
- Length: 79:31
- Labels: BBE, Rapster Records
- Producers: DJ Jazzy Jeff, Kev Brown, P. Smoovah, Ken Wood, Oddisee, Kenny "Dope" Gonzalez, Little Louie Vega

DJ Jazzy Jeff chronology
The Magnificent (2002)	The Return of the Magnificent (2007)

Professional ratings
Aggregate scores
Source	Rating
Metacritic	75/100
Review scores
Source	Rating
AllMusic	4/5 stars
Blender	2/5 stars
Dotmusic	2.5/5
Entertainment Weekly	B+
HipHopDX	3.5/5
Playlouder	3.5/5 stars
Q	3/5 stars
RapReviews	8/10
Slant Magazine	3.5/5 stars
Vibe	4/5 stars

The Magnificent is the first studio album by DJ Jazzy Jeff. It was released via BBE and Rapster Records on August 20 2002 (in USA) and September 12 2002 (in Europe).

== Critical reception ==
At Metacritic, which assigns a weighted average score out of 100 to reviews from mainstream critics, The Magnificent received an average score of 75% based on 11 reviews, indicating "generally favorable reviews".

In 2004, Philadelphia Weekly placed it at number 25 on the "100 Best Philly Albums of All Time" list.

== Track listing ==
No.	Title	Writer(s)	Producer(s)	Length
1.	"Da Ntro" (featuring Pauly Yamz and Baby Blak)	Paul Parker; Alva Burton; Jeff Townes	DJ Jazzy Jeff	3:32
2.	"Shake It Off" (featuring Chef Word)	Derek Washington; Kevin Brown	Kev Brown	4:34
3.	"For Da Love of Da Game" (featuring Baby Blak and Pauly Yamz)	Townes; Burton; Parker	DJ Jazzy Jeff	3:47
4.	"Break It Down" (featuring J-Live)	Pat McLain; Jean-Jacques Cadet	P. Smoovah	4:31
5.	"How I Do" (featuring Shawn Stockman and Cy Young)	Shawn Stockman; Anthony Harris; K. Brown	Kev Brown	4:27
6.	"Worldwide" (featuring Pauly Yamz and Baby Blak)	Parker; Burton; Ken Wood	Ken Wood	4:26
7.	"Musik Lounge" (featuring Oddisee)	Amir Mohamed	Oddisee	4:10
8.	"Rock Wit U" (featuring Erro)	Eric Roberson; K. Brown	Kev Brown	3:37
9.	"Travelz" (featuring Baby Blak and Crushall)	Burton; C. Brown; K. Brown	Kev Brown	3:47
10.	"Scram" (featuring Freddie Foxxx)	James Campbell; K. Brown	Kev Brown	5:01
11.	"My Peoples" (featuring Raheem)	Raheem DeVaughn; Townes; Valvin Roane; Stan Getz; Maria Toledo	DJ Jazzy Jeff	4:09
12.	"Know Ur Hood" (featuring Pauly Yamz and Chef Word)	Parker; Washington; K. Brown	Kev Brown	4:59
13.	"Love Saviour" (featuring Flo Brown and Raheem)	DeVaughn; Flo Brown; Wood; Townes	Ken Wood; DJ Jazzy Jeff	4:02
14.	"Mystery Man" (featuring The Last Emperor)	Jamal Gray; Wood	Ken Wood	3:09
15.	"We Are" (featuring Cy Young and Raheem)	Harris; DeVaughn; K. Brown	Kev Brown	4:12
16.	"Charmed Life" (featuring J-Live)	Cadet; McLain	P. Smoovah	4:16
17.	"We Live in Philly" (featuring Jill Scott)	Jill Scott; Townes	DJ Jazzy Jeff	6:34
18.	"In Time" (featuring V)	Roane; DeVaughn; Pete Kuzma	Masters at Work; Pete Kuzma	6:09

Sample credits

- "Da Ntro" contains a portion of "The Magnificent", written by Jeff Townes and Will Smith.
- "Musik Lounge" contains a sample of "Velas", written by Ivan Lins and Vítor Martins.
- "My Peoples" contains a sample of "Saudade Vem Correndo", written by Stan Getz and Maria Toledo.

== Charts ==
Chart	Peak position
US Top R&B/Hip-Hop Albums (Billboard)	73
US Independent Albums (Billboard)	39
