= All of the Above (J-Live album) =

Studio album by J-Live
- Released: April 2, 2002
- Genre: Hip-hop
- Length: 74:23
- Label: Coup d'État
- Producer: J-Live, Joe Money, DJ Spinna, P Smoovah, Ticklah, Richy Pitch

J-Live chronology
The Best Part (2001)	All of the Above (2002)	The Hear After (2005)

Singles from All of the Above
- 1. "Satisfied?" / "A Charmed Life" Released: 2002; 2. "Like This Anna" / "MCee" / "3 Out of 7" Released: 2002

All of the Above is the second studio album by American hip-hop artist J-Live. It was released on Coup d'État in 2002. The album cover pays homage to John Coltrane's Blue Train. The album peaked at number 28 on the Billboard Heatseekers Albums chart, as well as number 16 on the Independent Albums chart.

== Critical reception ==
Professional ratings
Review scores
Source	Rating
AllMusic	4/5 stars
Alternative Press	8/10
Blender	4/5 stars
Entertainment Weekly	A−
The Guardian	4/5 stars
HipHopDX	4.5/5
Pitchfork	8.5/10
Rolling Stone	3.5/5 stars
Spin	7/10
Vibe	4/5

Brad Haywood of Pitchfork gave the album an 8.5 out of 10, noting that "[J-Live's] delivery is similar to Posdnuos, and his lyrical content is along the same lines: intelligent, educated, confident, and socially conscious." Josh Wells of HipHopDX said: "There are virtually no weak tracks on 78 minutes of music." Nathan Rabin of The A.V. Club praised it as being "as assured and consistent as his debut, but far more ambitious in scope".

Jason Birchmeier of AllMusic gave the album 4 out of 5 stars and called it "an album for a select audience that prefers intellect and understated beats over bombast, boasting, booty, and bluntedness."

== Track listing ==
No.	Title	Producer(s)	Length
1.	"First Things First"	J-Live	4:11
2.	"How Real It Is"	J-Live, Joe Money	4:52
3.	"Satisfied?"	DJ Spinna	4:35
4.	"Interlude 1 (I'm a Rapper)"	J-Live	0:57
5.	"MCee"	J-Live	3:52
6.	"Like This Anna"	Joe Money	4:22
7.	"One for the Griot"	Joe Money	4:45
8.	"Stir of Echoes"	J-Live	6:16
9.	"Interlude 2 (For the Babies)"	J-Live	1:48
10.	"Do That S#!%"	DJ Spinna	3:35
11.	"All In Together Now"	DJ Spinna	3:16
12.	"Nights Like This"	Joe Money	4:20
13.	"The 4th 3rd"	J-Live	5:33
14.	"Traveling Music"	J-Live	3:38
15.	"A Charmed Life"	P Smoovah	3:52
16.	"All of the Above"	DJ Spinna	4:30
17.	"Interlude 3 (Whatever)"	J-Live	0:56
18.	"Happy Belated"	DJ Spinna	2:50
19.	"Satisfied (Dub Version)" (CD bonus track)	Ticklah	1:53
20.	"3 Out of 7" (CD bonus track; featuring Asheru and El Da Sensei)	DJ Spinna	4:10
21.	"The Lyricist" (CD bonus track)	Richy Pitch	3:32
Total length:			74:23

== Charts ==
Chart	Peak position
US Heatseekers Albums (Billboard)	28
US Independent Albums (Billboard)	16
