= The Fun Ones =

Studio album by RJD2
- Released: April 17, 2020
- Genre: Alternative hip hop; neo soul
- Length: 54:09
- Label: RJ's Electrical Connections
- Producer: RJD2

RJD2 chronology
Tendrils (2018)	The Fun Ones (2020)

Professional ratings
Review scores
Source	Rating
AllMusic	4/5 stars
Exclaim!	5/10

The Fun Ones is the seventh studio album by American musician RJD2. It was released on April 17, 2020, through RJ's Electrical Connections, with distribution via The Orchard. It features guest appearances from Aceyalone, Homeboy Sandman, Jordan Brown, Khari Mateen and STS.

PopMatters called it "possibly RJ's warmest, funkiest, and most laidback album, as well as a callback to his turntablist roots."

== Track listing ==
All music is composed by Ramble Jon Krohn.

The Fun Ones track listing
No.	Title	Length
1.	"No Helmet Up Indianola"	3:19
2.	"Indoor S'mores"	4:42
3.	"20 Grand Palace"	3:50
4.	"One of a Kind" (featuring Homeboy Sandman)	3:49
5.	"High Street Will Never Die"	4:58
6.	"Pull Up on Love" (featuring STS and Khari Mateen)	3:36
7.	"All I'm After" (featuring Jordan Brown)	5:03
8.	"Flocking to the Nearest Machine"	4:34
9.	"And It Sold for 45K"	2:05
10.	"The Freshman Lettered"	4:10
11.	"A Genuine Gentleman" (featuring Aceyalone)	3:54
12.	"Itch Ditch Mission"	2:45
13.	"My Very Own Burglar Neighbor"	3:08
14.	"A Salute to Blood Bowl Legends"	4:16
Total length:		54:09
