= Son Little =

American singer

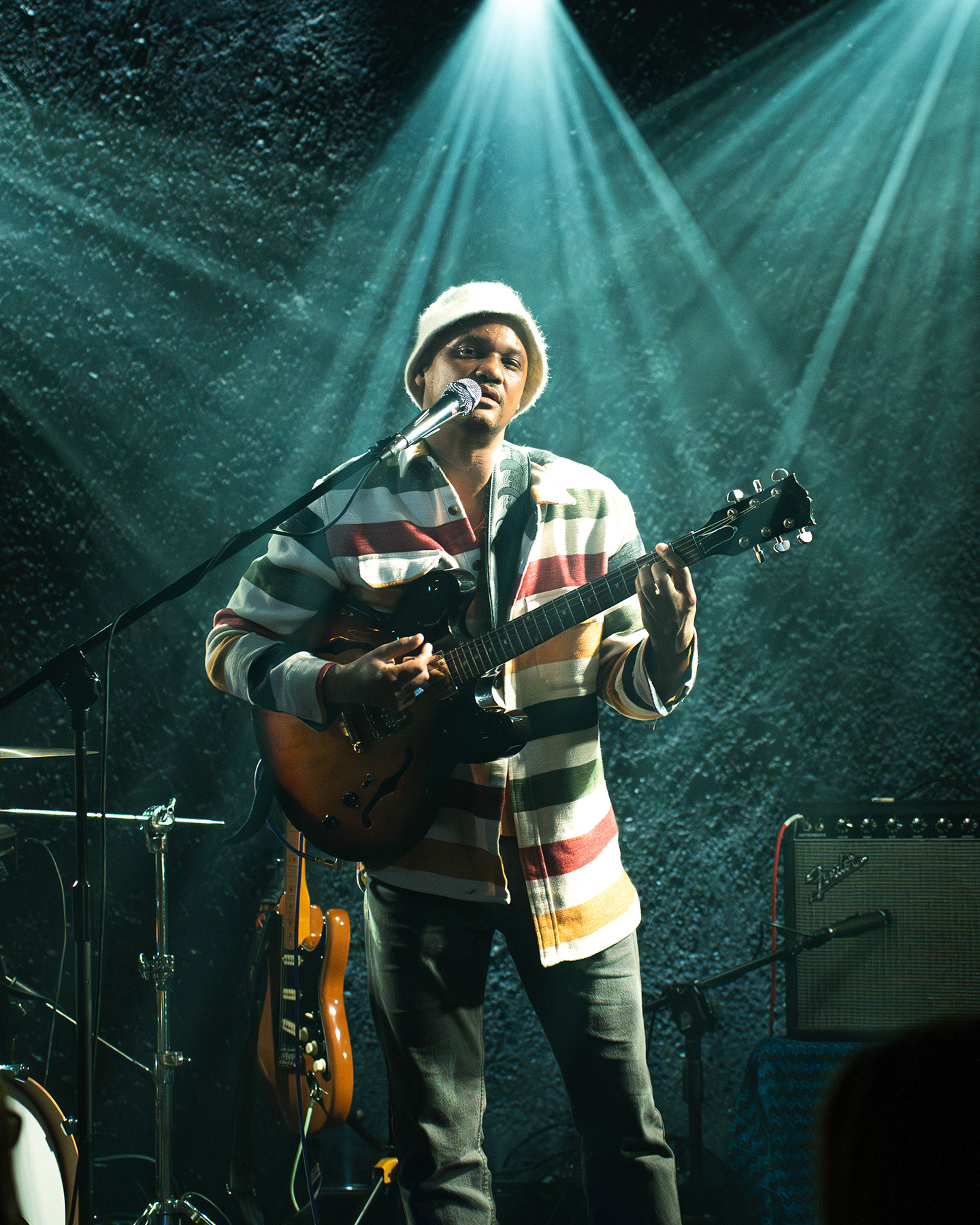
- Son Little performing at Jassmine jazz club in Warsaw, April 2026

Background information
- Born: Aaron Earl Livingston
- Origin: Philadelphia, Pennsylvania, United States
- Genres: Rhythm & blues, blues, soul
- Occupations: Singer-songwriter, record producer
- Years active: 2014-present
- Label: Anti- Records
- Formerly of: Icebird
- Website: Son Little on Facebook

Aaron Earl Livingston, also known by his stage name Son Little, is an American rhythm & blues musician from Philadelphia, Pennsylvania, United States.

Livingston is the son of a preacher (father) and a teacher (mother). His music blends the genres of soul, blues, folk, and hip-hop, and he has written and produced much of his own material.

== Career ==
=== 2014–2016: Solo debut and early releases ===
On November 10, 2014, Livingston released his debut EP as Son Little titled Things I Forgot via Anti- Records.

On October 16, 2015, Livingston released his first studio album, Son Little, with Anti- Records.

Son Little has collaborated with The Roots, RJD2, and Mavis Staples, whom he spoke highly of. In an interview with Sound of Boston he named Mavis Staples as one of his favorite singers; "She's one of my favorite people, let alone favorite singer."

In December 2015, Son Little performed an NPR Tiny Desk Concert which increased his national exposure. That same year, NPR named him a "Top Artist to Watch", as a notable voice in the evolution of modern R&B and soul.

In 2016, Son Little made his network television debut on CBS Saturday Morning, where he performed the songs “Your Love Will Blow Me Away,” “O Mother,” and “The River.” That year, he also received a Grammy Award for Best American Roots Performance for his work as a producer on Mavis Staples’ EP Your Good Fortune, specifically for the track “See That My Grave Is Kept Clean.”

=== 2017–2019: New Magic and expanded recognition ===
On June 6, 2017, he released "Blue Magic (Waikiki)" as the first single off his next studio album, New Magic, which he announced would be released on September 15, 2017, via Anti- Records. On August 1, 2017, he released "Demon To The Dark" as the second single off New Magic.

During this period, Son Little’s performances at major festivals and venues helped expand his audience, including appearances at Bonnaroo, Pickathon, Electric Forest, and the Montreal Jazz Festival. He also performed on the Millennium Stage at the Kennedy Center in Washington, D.C., and conducted multiple headline tours across North America and Europe, while supporting artists such as Leon Bridges and Kelis.

=== 2020–present: Artistic evolution and later releases ===
Son Little’s subsequent studio albums Aloha (2020) and Like Neptune (2022) received coverage from outlets including NPR, Pitchfork, Rolling Stone, and American Songwriter. Several of his tracks appeared in television and streaming placements, such as FX’s Atlanta, Netflix’s Seven Seconds, and ESPN documentaries. In 2022 he appeared as a featured vocalist on "How Do We Heal" by The Suffers.

In 2023, Son Little appeared on the track "Protocol" on the collaborative album Glorious Game by El Michels Affair and Black Thought. In November of that year, Son Little co-wrote the track “Falling Star” with Féfé (best known as a member of Saïan Supa Crew), contributing English-language vocals alongside Féfé’s French-language verses.

In 2024, he recorded a session for NPR at the Aspen Ideas Festival in Colorado. In 2025, he appeared as a featured vocalist on "New Beginning", a track by Che Noir.

Following a tour through the UK and Europe supporting Larkin Poe, Son Little announced a new album, Cityfolk, which was released in March 2026. He released singles from the album, including “In Orbit” and “Be Better,” ahead of the full release.

== Influences ==
In an interview with Sound of Boston, Livingston cited Paul McCartney's Ram, Kendrick Lamar's Good Kid, M.A.A.D City, Grizzly Bear's Shields and Little Dragon's Ritual Union as inspirations for his debut album.

== Discography ==
=== Studio albums ===
- The Abandoned Lullaby (2011) (with RJD2, as Icebird)
- Son Little (2015)
- New Magic (2017)
- Aloha (2020)
- Like Neptune (2022)
- Cityfolk (2026)

=== EPs ===
- Things I Forgot (2014)

=== Guest appearances ===
- The Roots – "Guns Are Drawn" from The Tipping Point (2004)
- Hezekiah – "Right On" from Hurry Up & Wait (2005)
- Hezekiah – "Moments in Sometime" from I Predict a Riot (2007)
- Hezekiah – "Here's to the World" from Conscious Porn (2010)
- RJD2 – "Crumbs Off the Table" from The Colossus (2010)
- The Roots – "Sleep" from Undun (2011)
- MHz Legacy – "Tero Smith" from MHz Legacy (2012)
- Hot Sugar – "Honeycomb Hideout" from Midi Murder (2013)
- RJD2 – "Love and Go" from More Is Than Isn't (2013)
- RJD2 – "We Come Alive" from Dame Fortune (2016)
- Portugal. The Man – "Number One" from Woodstock (2017)
- Che Noir – "New Beginning" from The Color Chocolate 2 (2025)
