= Honey Bxby =

American rapper (born 1999)

- Honey Bxby in 2025

Background information
- Born: Asbury Park, New Jersey
- Genres: Hip-hop; R&B; pop
- Years active: 2019–present
- Labels: Warner; Rebirth Entertainment; ART@WAR; Atlantic
- Website: www.itshoneybxby.com

Ajaysiya Byers (born October 26, 1999), known professionally as Honey Bxby, is an American rapper and singer-songwriter. She is best known for her viral singles on the Atlantic Records, Rebirth Entertainment, Art@War and Warner Records labels.

== Early life and career ==
Honey Bxby, birth name Ajaysiya Byers, was raised in Asbury Park, New Jersey. She is of Hispanic and African American heritage. Her father was a music producer, and she began writing music, recording, and singing in the studio with him at a very young age.

She attended cosmetology school before launching her music career in 2019.

== Label signing, recording and touring career ==
In 2022 Bxby signed a deal with Atlantic Records imprint ART@WAR, whose A&R team had noted the popularity of her music on Instagram. She released her first EP on Atlantic, 3 Words, 8 Letters, in 2023, including the multi-million-streaming single "Touchin'". A breakout performance came at the 2023 Soul Train Awards. In the fall she toured with Sexyy Red.

In 2024 the label released her single "Left Eye," a tribute to Lisa "Left Eye" Lopes. It was followed in June 2025 by a remix of the song featuring Lil' Kim. Bxby was Billboard's "Freshest Find" in February 2024. In April 2024 Atlantic released a remix of "Touchin'" featuring Busta Rhymes.

In May 2025, now signed to Warner Records, Bxby released her debut EP on that label, Raw Honey, with a release party event at Planet Hollywood in New York. Her touring highlights of 2025 included performing with Lil' Kim at the BET Awards Red Carpet Live in Los Angeles and performing at the 2025 Essence Festival of Culture at Caesars Superdome. She was also the BET Amplified Artist for the month of June.
