= J-Live =

American rapper (born 1976)

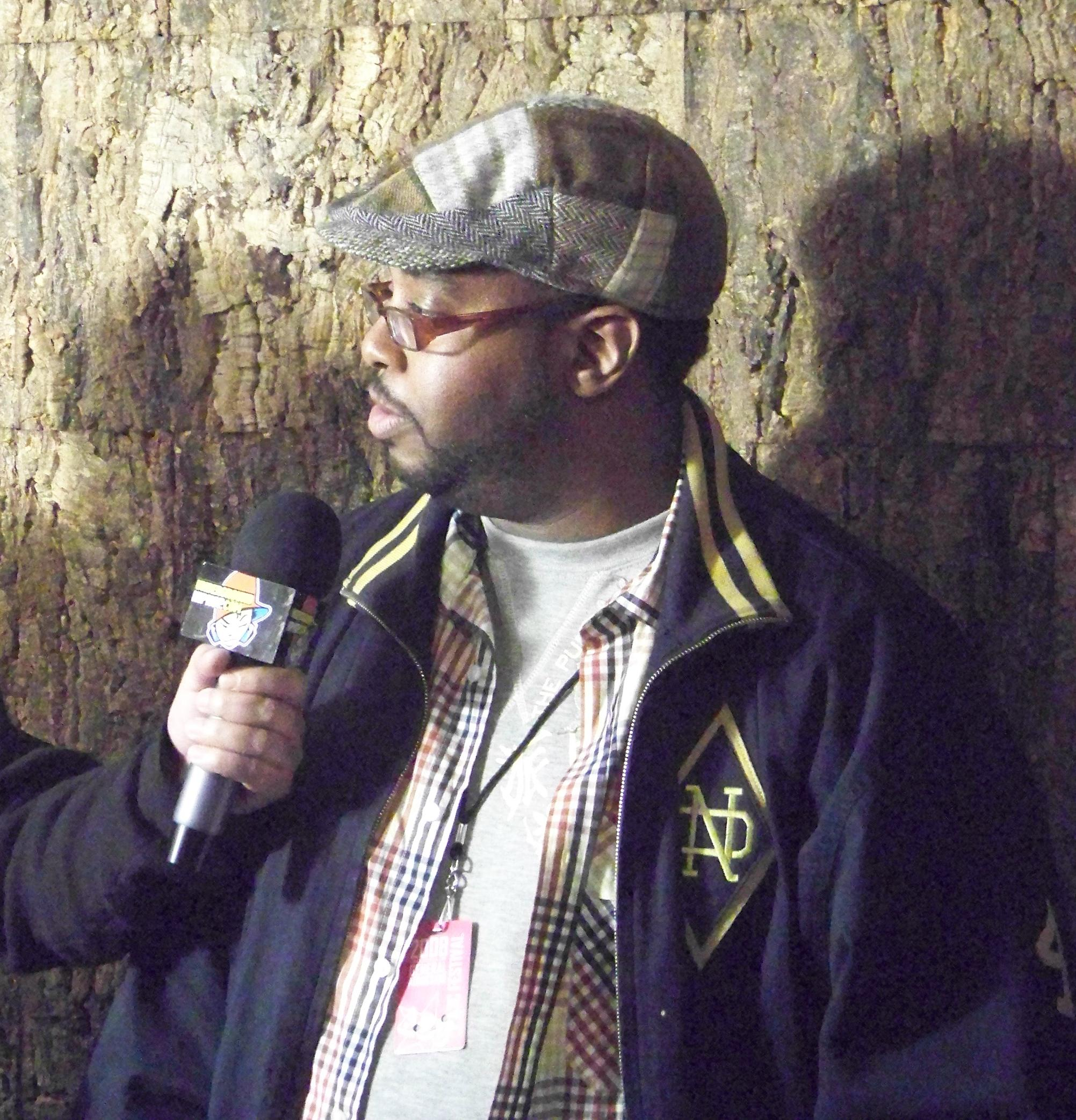
- J-Live in an interview in 2011

Background information
- Also known as: Justice Allah
- Born: Jean-Jacques Cadet; February 22, 1976 (age 50); New York City, U.S.
- Genres: Hip-hop
- Occupations: Rapper; disc jockey; record producer
- Years active: 1993–present
- Labels: Triple Threat Productions; BBE; Coup d'État; Penalty Recordings
- Website: realjlive.com

Jean-Jacques Cadet (born February 22, 1976), better known by his stage name J-Live, is an American rapper, DJ, and record producer.

== Life and career ==
J-Live released his debut studio album, The Best Part, in 2001. It featured production by DJ Premier, Pete Rock, and Prince Paul. In 2002, his second studio album, All of the Above, was released on Coup D'état. It has sold 30,000 copies.

J-Live's third studio album, The Hear After, was released in 2005. In 2008, he released the fourth studio album, Then What Happened?, on BBE. In 2011, he released a studio album, S.P.T.A. (Said Person of That Ability).

From 1998 to 2002, J-Live served as an English teacher in Brownsville and Bushwick, Brooklyn.

== Discography ==
=== Studio albums ===
- The Best Part (2001)
- All of the Above (2002)
- The Hear After (2005)
- Then What Happened? (2008)
- S.P.T.A. (Said Person of That Ability) (2011)
- Around the Sun (2014)
- His Own Self (2015)
- How Much Is Water? (2015)

=== EPs ===
- Always Has Been (2003)
- Always Will Be (2003)
- Reveal the Secret (2007)
- Undivided Attention (2010)
- At the Date of This Writing (Vol. 1) (2016)
- Lose No Time (EP) (2021)

=== Singles ===
- "Longevity" / "Braggin' Writes" (1995)
- "Can I Get It?" (1996)
- "Jook" (1996) (with Creo-D)
- "Satisfied?" b/w "A Charmed Life" (2002)
- "Like This Anna" / "MCee" / "3 Out of 7" (2002)
- "Bosoms" (2003) (with Wordsworth and Soulive)
- "Don't Play" (2003)
- "3 Out of 7" (2003)
- "Reset the Game" (2004) (with Oktober)
- "Don't Get It Backwards" (2004)
- "Harder" / "Do My Thing" (2005)
- "The Upgrade" / "The Understanding" (2008)
- "No Time to Waste" / "Home or Away" (2010)
- "The Way That I Rhyme" / "Poetry in Motion" (2010)

=== Guest appearances ===
- Walkin' Large - "Interaction" from Self (1998)
- Handsome Boy Modeling School - "The Truth" from So... How's Your Girl? (1999)
- Peshay - "End of Story" from Miles from Home (1999)
- Masterminds - "Seven" from The Underground Railroad (2000)
- Unsung Heroes - "What Would You Do?" from Unleashed (2000)
- Lone Catalysts - "Dynomite" (2000)
- Ambivalence - "Red Light Green Light" from Electric Treatment (2000)
- Vakill - "Hip Hop Romper Room Pt. 1" and "Hip Hop Romper Room Pt. 2" from Kill Em All (2001)
- J. Rawls - "Great Live Caper" from The Essence of J. Rawls (2001)
- Asheru & Blue Black - "Trackrunners" from Soon Come... (2001)
- Rob Swift - "Sub Level" from Sound Event (2002)
- El Da Sensei - "Whatyawando?" from Relax Relate Release (2002)
- Richy Pitch - "The Lyricist" from Live at Home (2002)
- DJ Jazzy Jeff - "Break It Down" and "Charmed Life" from The Magnificent (2002)
- 7L & Esoteric - "Rules of Engagement" from Dangerous Connection (2002)
- Lifesavas - "Selector" from Spirit in Stone (2003)
- The Nextmen - "31st February" from Get Over It (2003)
- Soulive - "Azucar Remix" from Turn It Out Remixed (2003)
- Iomos Marad - "Appetite to Write" from Deep Rooted (2003)
- Oktober - "Reset the Game" from Projekt: Building (2004)
- DJ Nu-Mark - "Brand Nu Live" from Hands On (2004)
- Asamov - "Standing Room Only" from And Now... (2005)
- Da Beatminerz - "O!" from Fully Loaded w/ Statik (2005)
- Pigeon John - "The Last Sunshine" from And the Summertime Pool Party (2006)
- DJ Jazzy Jeff - "Practice" from The Return of the Magnificent (2007)
- The Quantic Soul Orchestra - "She Said What?" from Tropidélico (2007)
- Asheru - "Boogie" from 3 Stars, 2 Bars (2007)
- Apathy - "Observe the Sound" from Hell's Lost & Found: It's the Bootleg, Muthafu@kas! Volume 2 (2007)
- Dela - "I Say Peace" and "The City" from Changes of Atmosphere (2008)
- Black Grass - "Set It Straight" from Three (2008)
- Jazz Liberatorz - "Vacation" from Clin D'Oeil (2008)
- Fakts One - "Audiovisual" from Long Range (2008)
- Apathy - "This Is the Formula" from Wanna Struggle? (2009)
- Oddisee - "What's Crazy?" from Mental Liberation (2009)
- DJ JS-1 - "Too Easy" from Ground Original 2: No Sell Out (2009)
- R.A. the Rugged Man - "Give It Up" from Legendary Classics Volume 1 (2009)
- Homecut - "Time Difference" from No Freedom Without Sacrifice (2009)
- Solillaquists of Sound - "Death of the Muse" from No More Heroes (2009)
- Illus - "Magical" from Family First (2012)
- DJ Nu-Mark - "Tonight" (2012)
- CunninLynguists - "Beyond the Sun" from Strange Journey Volume Three (2014)
- Homeboy Sandman - "Enough" from Hallways (2014)
- L'Orange and Kool Keith - "The Traveler" from Time? Astonishing! (2015)
- Praverb - "Record Companies" from The Legacy (2016)
