= The Best Part (album) =

Studio album by J-Live
- Released: May 1, 2001
- Recorded: 1996–1999
- Genre: Hip-hop
- Length: 74:23
- Label: Triple Threat Productions
- Producers: J-Live, Emmai Alaquiva, 88-Keys, Grap Luva, Pete Rock, Prince Paul, Chris Catalyst, Probe.dms, DJ Spinna, David Kennedy, DJ Premier

J-Live chronology
The Best Part (2001)	All of the Above (2002)

The Best Part is the debut studio album by American hip-hop artist J-Live. It was released on Triple Threat Productions in 2001.

== Background ==
The Best Part was recorded from 1996 to 1999 and featured production by Prince Paul, DJ Premier, and Pete Rock. It was set for a 1999 release, but due to problems with his record label, Raw Shack Records, J-Live left the label and the album was shelved. J-Live moved to Payday Records, but when Payday's parent company London Records was bought from Universal Music Group by WEA, the album was again shelved. In 2001, copies surfaced as bootlegs and several were of such high quality it was rumored that J-Live himself was behind them. By the fall of 2001, after five years of label problems, The Best Part was finally officially released on Triple Threat Productions.

== Critical reception ==
Professional ratings
Review scores
Source	Rating
AllMusic	4.5/5 stars
The A.V. Club	favorable
Exclaim!	favorable
HipHopDX	4.5/5 stars
RapReviews.com	10/10

Stanton Swihart of AllMusic gave the album 4.5 out of 5 stars, writing: "It is a truly cataclysmic tour de force, especially when you consider the hoops through which the music was forced to jump before it finally appeared, long overdue, in 2001."

In 2015, Fact placed it at number 49 on the "100 Best Indie Hip-Hop Records of All Time" list. In that year, HipHopDX included it on the "30 Best Underground Hip Hop Albums Since 2000" list.

In 2020, HipHopGoldenAge ranked it 3 on their "Top 150 Hip Hop Albums of The Decade" list.

== Track listing ==
No.	Title	Producer(s)	Length
1.	"Outside Looking"	J-Live	1:48
2.	"Intro"	Emmai Alaquiva	1:13
3.	"Got What It Takes"	88-Keys	5:09
4.	"Don't Play"	88-Keys	5:04
5.	"Vampire Hunter J"	Grap Luva	2:59
6.	"Yes!"	Emmai Alaquiva	3:32
7.	"Them That's Not"	Grap Luva	5:12
8.	"Kick It to the Beat" (featuring Asheru and Probe.dms)	Pete Rock	4:22
9.	"Wax Paper"	Prince Paul	3:27
10.	"Timeless"	Chris Catalyst	4:00
11.	"Get the Third"	Chris Catalyst, Probe.dms	4:45
12.	"School's In (Remix)"	88-Keys, J-Live	5:14
13.	"R.A.G.E."	DJ Spinna	3:36
14.	"True School Anthem"	DJ Spinna	4:23
15.	"Inside Looking Outro"	David Kennedy, Emmai Alaquiva	2:07
16.	"The Best Part"	DJ Premier	3:36
17.	"Play"	88-Keys, David Kennedy	5:01
18.	"Braggin' Writes Revisited"	David Kennedy	3:17
19.	"Epilogue"	J-Live	5:30
Total length:			74:23
