= Aesop Rock discography =

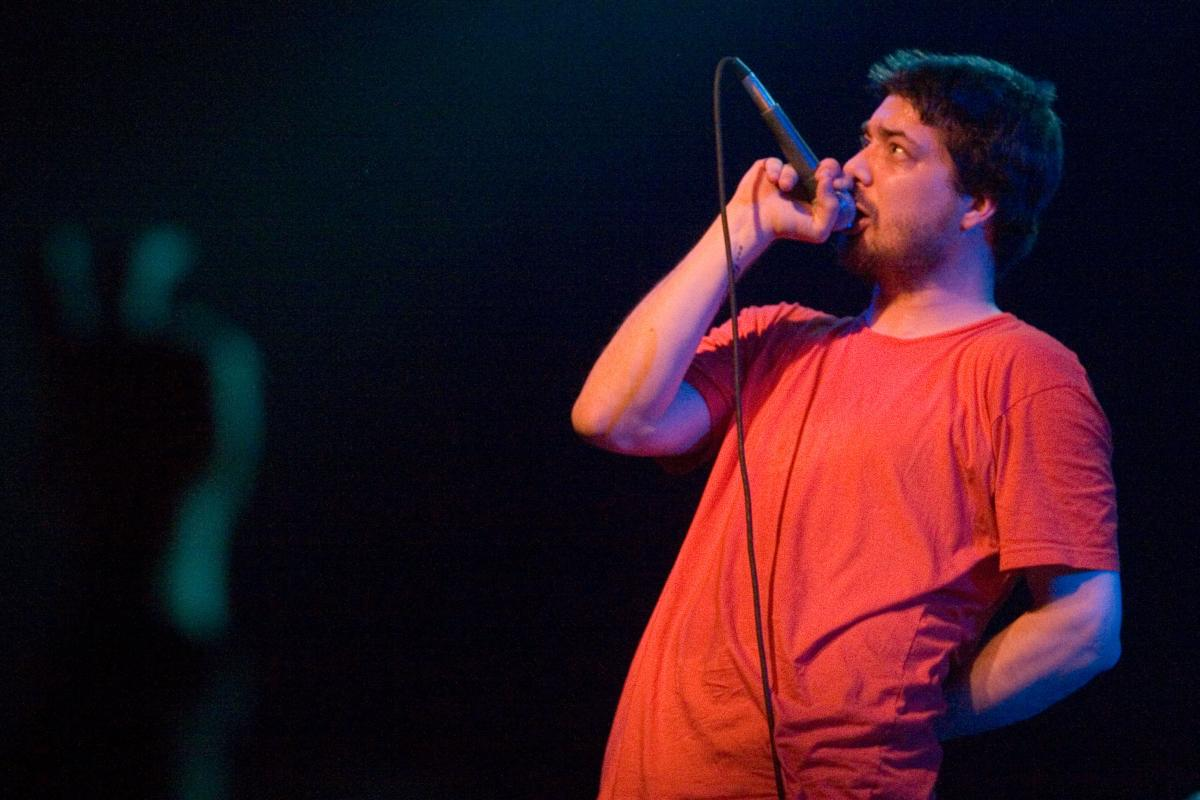
- Aesop Rock performing in 2006
- Studio albums: 12
- Extended plays: 4
- Singles: 17
- Music videos: 17
- Guest appearances: 43
- Production credits: 13
- Appearances on compilations: 14
- Collaborations: 4

Aesop Rock is an American hip hop rapper who is currently signed to Rhymesayers Entertainment. His discography consists of twelve studio albums, three extended plays, ten singles, four collaborations, one compilation, nine music videos, and many appearances on other artists' tracks and on compilations.

Aesop initially recorded and released two self-financed records: Music for Earthworms in 1998 and the Appleseed EP in 1999. After being signed to the Mush label, Aesop Rock released his first studio album, Float, in 2000. Shortly thereafter, Aesop Rock signed to the Manhattan-based hip hop label Definitive Jux, where he released Labor Days in 2001, Bazooka Tooth in 2003, and None Shall Pass in 2007. His albums since then – Skelethon (2012), The Impossible Kid (2016), Spirit World Field Guide (2020), Garbology (2021), Integrated Tech Solutions (2023) and Black Hole Superette (2025) – have been released by Rhymesayers Entertainment.

== Albums ==
=== Studio albums ===
List of studio albums, with selected chart positions and sales figures
Title	Album details	Peak chart positions				
Title	Album details	US	US R&B /HH	US Rap	US Ind.	UK
Float	Released: September 5, 2000; Label: Mush; Format: CD, LP, cassette	—	—	—	—	—
Labor Days	Released: September 18, 2001; Label: Definitive Jux; Format: CD, LP, digital download	—	—	—	—	—
Bazooka Tooth	Released: September 23, 2003; Label: Definitive Jux; Format: CD, LP, digital download	112	44	—	7	—
None Shall Pass	Released: August 28, 2007; Label: Definitive Jux; Format: CD, LP, digital download	50	35	—	—	—
Skelethon	Released: July 10, 2012; Label: Rhymesayers Entertainment; Format: CD, LP, digital download	21	5	2	1	—
The Impossible Kid	Released: April 29, 2016; Label: Rhymesayers Entertainment; Format: CD, LP, digital download, streaming	30	3	2	2	189
Spirit World Field Guide	Released: November 13, 2020; Label: Rhymesayers Entertainment; Format: CD, LP, digital download, streaming	54	26	24	9	—
Garbology (with Blockhead)	Released: November 12, 2021; Label: Rhymesayers Entertainment; Format: CD, LP, digital download, streaming	—	—	—	—	—
Integrated Tech Solutions	Released: November 10, 2023; Label: Rhymesayers Entertainment; Format: CD, LP, digital download, streaming	169	—	—	27	—
Black Hole Superette	Released: May 30, 2025; Label: Rhymesayers Entertainment; Format: CD, LP, digital download, streaming	171	—	—	—	—
I Heard It's a Mess There Too	Released: October 27, 2025; Label: Rhymesayers Entertainment; Format: CD, LP, digital download, streaming, cassette	—	—	—	—	—
Trouble Mountain (with Blockhead)	Released: November 13, 2026; Label: Rhymesayers Entertainment; Format: CD, LP, digital download, streaming, cassette	—	—	—	—	—
"—" denotes releases that did not chart.

=== Mixtapes ===
Title	Album details
Music for Earthworms	Released: 1998; Label: Self-released; Format: CD-R, cassette

=== Soundtrack albums ===
Title	Album details
Bushwick	Released: August 11, 2017; Label: Lakeshore; Format: CD, LP, digital download

=== Downloadable mixes ===
List of downloadable mixes, with selected chart positions and sales figures
Title	Album details	Sales
All Day: Nike+ Original Run	Released: February 2007; Format: MD, Digital Download; Label: Nike Sports Music	US: 20,000
The Blob	Released: April 2014; Format: MD, Digital Download; Label: Rhymesayers Entertainment	

== Extended plays ==
List of extended plays, with selected chart positions and sales figures
Title	Album details	Peak chart positions			
Title	Album details	US	US R&B /HH	US Heat.	US Ind.
Appleseed	Released: 1999; Format: CD-R, Cassette; Label: self-released	—	—	—	—
Daylight	Released: February 5, 2002; Format: CD, LP, Digital Download; Label: Definitive Jux	—	—	—	15
Fast Cars, Danger, Fire and Knives	Released: February 22, 2005; Format: CD, LP, Digital Download; Label: Definitive Jux	190	100	9	21
Cat Food	Released: January 5, 2015; Format: LP, Digital Download; Label: Rhymesayers	—	—	—	—
Freedom Finger (Music from the Game)	Release date: April 7, 2020; Format: LP, Digital Download; Label: Rhymesayers	—	—	—	—
The Recycling Bin	Release date: January 28, 2022; Format: LP, Digital Download; Label: Rhymesayers	—	—	—	—
"—" denotes releases that did not chart.

== Singles ==
List of singles as lead artist, showing year released and album name
Title	Year	Album
"Coma"	2001	Labor Days
"Boombox"	2001	Labor Days
"Daylight"	2002	Labor Days & Daylight
"Limelighters"	2003	Bazooka Tooth
"Freeze"	2003	Bazooka Tooth
"Easy"	2003	Bazooka Tooth
"All in All"	2004	Def Jux Presents 3
"The One That Got Away"	2006	The Next Best Thing
"None Shall Pass"	2007	None Shall Pass
"Coffee"	2007	None Shall Pass
"Zero Dark Thirty"	2012	Skelethon
"ZZZ Top"	2012	Skelethon
"Cat Food"/"Bug Zapper"	2015	Non-album single
"Rings"	2016	The Impossible Kid
"Blood Sandwich"	2016	The Impossible Kid
"My Belly"	2016	Non-album singles
"Hot Dogs"	2017	Non-album singles
"Klutz"	2018	Non-album singles
"Rogue Wave"	2020	Non-album singles
"The Gates"	2020	Spirit World Field Guide
"Pizza Alley"	2020	Spirit World Field Guide
"Long Legged Larry"	2021	Non-album single
"Mindful Solutionism"	2023	Integrated Tech Solutions
"By the River"	2023	Integrated Tech Solutions
"Infinity Fill Goose Down"	2023	Integrated Tech Solutions
"Checkers"	2025	Black Hole Superette
"Send Help"	2025	Black Hole Superette
"Roadwork Rappin'"	2025	Non-album single

== Music videos ==
=== As lead artist ===
Year	Album	Title	Director	Other featured artist
1997	Music for Earthworms	"Abandon All Hope"	Ian Bavitz	
2003	Bazooka Tooth	"Freeze"	Michael Kuhn	
2003	Bazooka Tooth	"No Jumper Cables"	Joey Garfield	
2005	Fast Cars, Danger, Fire and Knives	"Fast Cars"	Asif Mian	
2007	None Shall Pass	"None Shall Pass"	Michael Kuhn	
2007	None Shall Pass	"Coffee"	Ace Norton	John Darnielle
2012	Skelethon	"Zero Dark Thirty"	Isaac Ravishankara	
2012	Skelethon	"ZZZ Top"	Pete Lee	
2012	Skelethon	"Cycles to Gehenna"	Ben Fee & Pete Lee	
2012	Skelethon	"Homemade Mummy"	—N/a	Rob Sonic
2016	The Impossible Kid	"Rings"	Rob Shaw	
2016	The Impossible Kid	"Blood Sandwich"	Rob Shaw	
2016	The Impossible Kid	"Lazy Eye: Live from the Peculiarium"	Rob Shaw	
2016	The Impossible Kid	"Dorks"	Rob Shaw	
2016	The Impossible Kid	"Kirby"	Toben Seymour	
2016	The Impossible Kid	"Shrunk"	Rob Shaw	
2016	The Impossible Kid	"Lotta Years: Live from the Hill"	Rob Shaw	
2017	The Impossible Kid	"Get Out of the Car"	Rob Shaw	
2017	—N/a	"Hot Dogs"	Kurt Hayashi	
2018	—N/a	"Klutz"	Rob Shaw	
2018	Malibu Ken	"Acid King"	Rob Shaw	Tobacco
2018	Malibu Ken	"Corn Maze"	Rob Shaw	Tobacco
2019	Malibu Ken	"Tuesday"	Rob Shaw	Tobacco
2020	—N/a	"Rogue Wave"	Rob Shaw	
2020	Spirit World Field Guide	"The Gates"	Rob Shaw	
2020	Spirit World Field Guide	"Pizza Alley"	Rob Shaw	
2020	Spirit World Field Guide	"Coveralls"	Rob Shaw	
2020	Freedom Finger (soundtrack)	"Drums on the Wheel"	Rob Shaw	
2021	—N/a	"Long Legged Larry"	Rob Shaw	
2021	Garbology	"Jumping Coffin"	Rob Shaw	Blockhead
2021	Garbology	"Jazz Hands"	Rob Shaw	Blockhead
2021	Garbology	"Flamingo Pink"	Rob Shaw	Blockhead
2022	Garbology	"All the Smartest People"	Aesop Rock	Blockhead
2023	Integrated Tech Solutions	"Mindful Solutionism"	Justin "Coro" Kaufman	
2023	Integrated Tech Solutions	"By the River"	Aesop Rock	
2023	Integrated Tech Solutions	"Kyanite Toothpick"	Kalil Justin	Hanni El Khatib
2023	Integrated Tech Solutions	"All City Nerve Map"	Aesop Rock	
2024	Integrated Tech Solutions	"Pigeonometry"	Aesop Rock	
2025	Black Hole Superette	"Checkers"	Justin "Coro" Kaufman	
2025	Black Hole Superette	"Send Help"	Aesop Rock Justin "Coro" Kaufman	
2025	Black Hole Superette	"Costco"	Aesop Rock Justin "Coro" Kaufman	
2025	Black Hole Superette	"Movie Night"	Aesop Rock Justin "Coro" Kaufman	
2025	—N/a	"Roadwork Rappin'"	Marmo Films	
2025	I Heard It's A Mess There Too	"Full House Pinball"	Justin "Coro" Kaufman	
2025	I Heard It's A Mess There Too	"Pay The Man"	Justin "Coro" Kaufman	
2026	Trouble Mountain	"Trouble Trouble"	Justin "Coro" Kaufman Aesop Rock	Blockhead
2026	Trouble Mountain	"Coyote Summer"	Evan Gütt	Blockhead Hanni El Khatib

=== As featured artist ===
Year	Artist	Title	Director	Other featured artist
2011	Hail Mary Mallon	"Garfield"	Alexander Tarrant and Justin Metros	
2011	Hail Mary Mallon	"Meter Feeder"	Alexander Tarrant and Justin Metros	
2011	Hail Mary Mallon	"Grubstake"	Alexander Tarrant and Justin Metros	
2011	Hail Mary Mallon	"Breakdance Beach"	Alexander Tarrant and Justin Metros	
2013	Dark Time Sunshine	"Take My Hand"	X:144	Swamburger
2013	The Uncluded	"Earthquake"	/	
2013	The Uncluded	"Alligator"	/	
2013	The Uncluded	"Delicate Cycle"	Pete Lee & Ben Fee	
2013	The Uncluded	"The Aquarium"	Rob Shaw	
2013	The Uncluded	"Organs"	Rob Shaw	
2014	Hail Mary Mallon	"Jonathan"	Rob Shaw	
2014	Hail Mary Mallon	"Kiln"	Galen McKamy	
2014	Hail Mary Mallon	"Whales"	Toben Seymour	
2015	Hail Mary Mallon	"4AM"	Gerald Anekwe	
2015	B. Dolan	"Jailbreak"	Jay Bartleby	
2021	Atmosphere	"Barcade"	Rob Shaw	MF Doom

== Guest appearances ==
Year	Song	Artist(s)	Album
2001	"Put Your Quarter Up"	Molemen with Slug + MF Doom	Ritual of The... Revisited and Remastered
2001	"Water"	Atoms Family	Euphony
2001	"Coma" (Remix)	Atoms Family	Euphony
2001	"Sinister"	Atoms Family with Yeshua DaPOeD + Vast Air	Euphony
2001	"Blacklist"	Prefuse 73 + MF Doom	Vocal Studies + Uprock Narratives
2002	"Take Me to the Basement"	The Opus	First Contact 001
2002	"Intelligent"	DJ Murge	Search and Destroy
2002	"Killing Time"	Illogic	Got Lyrics?
2002	"Dry Bones (Remix)"	Oddjobs with Vast Aire + Kimani	—N/a
2002	"Flesh (Remix)"	Atmosphere	—N/a
2002	"Delorean"	El-P	Fantastic Damage
2002	"Success"	Mr. Lif	I Phantom
2002	"Skip Town"	DJ Spooky	Modern Mantra
2003	"Obsolete"	Blueprint with Slug, Eyedea + Illogic	The Weightroom
2003	"Secret Agents"	Chase Phoenix	Cut to the Chase
2003	"Happy Pillz"	Murs	The End of the Beginning
2003	"Final Frontier (Remix)"	RJD2 with Blueprint, Murs + Vast Aire	The Horror
2003	"Love to Fuck"	S.A. Smash	Smashy Trashy
2003	"Shut Down"	Push Button Objects	Ghetto Blaster
2004	"Encounter"	Blueprint	Chamber Music
2004	"Hold Mine"	Blueprint with Slug, Illogic + Eyedea	Printmatic: Vitamins and Minerals EP
2004	"Apocalypse Zone"	Cryptic One	The Anti-Mobius Theory
2004	"Time Capsule"	Illogic + Vast Aire	Celestial Clockwork
2004	"Crooked"	Evil Nine	You Can Be Special Too
2004	"Jet Son"	Blockhead + Camu Tao	Sunday Seance
2004	"Kill Switch"	DJ Krush	Jaku
2004	"Posse Slash"	Vast Aire with Karniege, Breez Evahflowin + Poison Pen	Look Mom... No Hands
2005	"Worlds Collide"	Rasco	The Dick Swanson Theory
2005	"Lo-Fi Funk"	Blueprint	1988
2005	"Sabbatical with Options"	Prefuse 73	Surrounded by Silence
2005	"Poems 4 Post Modern Decay"	Zion I	True & Livin'
2005	"Voltronic Instructional Espionage"	Grayskul	Deadlivers
2005	"Try to Remember"	Hangar 18	The Donkey Show Volume 1
2005	"Helium"	Vordul Mega	Yung World
2005	"Akinesia"	Tame One + The Dusted Dons	Slow Suicide Stimulus
2005	"Side Two"	DJ Ese + Babbletron	—N/a
2005	"Nuclear Five"	The Presence, Karniege + Masai Bey	Common Man's Anthems
2005	"Left It to Us"	Cage, El-P, Tame One + Yak Ballz	Hell's Winter
2006	"Take, Hold, Fire"	Mr. Lif + El-P	Mo' Mega
2007	"Run the Numbers"	El-P	I'll Sleep When You're Dead
2007	"The Office"	Grayskul + Slug	Bloody Radio
2007	"Smoke If You Got'um"	Rob Sonic	Sabotage Gigante
2007	"Catch 22"	Grimace Federation	Tasted by Chemists
2007	"Borrowedtime"	Luckyiam + Slug	Most Likely to Succeed
2007	"The Dirt and the Filth"	Percee P	Perseverance
2008	"The Page That Built Me"	Percee P + Oh No	Oh No Vs.Percee P
2008	"Dirt"	Tobacco	Fucked Up Friends
2008	"Alchemy"	Blueprint	Iron & Niacin
2008	"Lovecraft in Brooklyn" (Remix)	The Mountain Goats	Heretic Pride
2008	"Tomorrow Morning"	El-P	Ghosts of the Barbary Coast
2008	"The Explanation"	The Gigantics	Die Already
2009	"Diabolical Fun (Remix)"	Illogic	—N/a
2009	"Low Tide"	DJ Signify	Of Cities
2009	"Sink or Swim"	DJ Signify	Of Cities
2009	"Molly"	Tame One	Acid Tab Vocab
2009	"Stand Up"	Awol One, Factor + Myka 9	Owl Hours
2009	"Wood-Chip Grinder"	Mac Lethal	Love Potion Collection Vol. 5
2009	"Know That to Know This"	Themselves	The Free Houdini Deluxe
2009	"Give It Up"	Felt	Felt 3: A Tribute to Rosie Perez
2010	"Primor"	Dark Time Sunshine	Vessel
2011	"Miama Advice" "Zero or a Zillion" "The Library" "Walk Like Thunder"	Kimya Dawson	Thunder Thighs
2011	"Shout It In"	Dirty Ghosts	—N/a
2012	"Superhands Mantra (Fuck Us All)"	Busdriver	—N/a
2012	"Take My Hand"	Dark Time Sunshine	ANX
2013	"Tumbleweed"	billy woods	Dour Candy
2013	"Not Going Anywhere"	Grayskul	Zenith
2014	"Ego Death"	Busdriver	Perfect Hair
2014	"Castles"	CunninLynguists	Strange Journey Volume 3
2014	"Air Pegasus (Le Cadeau)"	MarQ Spekt + Blockhead	—N/a
2014	"Kill Joy"	Rob Sonic	Alice in Thunderdome
2015	"Jailbreak"	B. Dolan	Kill the Wolf
2016	"I Went Outside Today"	Open Mike Eagle + Paul White	Hella Personal Film Festival
2016	"Prometheus"	DanOne	'N Funk
2016	"Speak Truth"	Homeboy Sandman, Kurious + Breeze Brewin	Kindness for Weakness
2017	"Wonderful"	billy woods, Blockhead + Homeboy Sandman	Known Unknowns
2019	"Kiss the Cook" (Televangelist Remix)	Blockhead + billy woods	Free Sweatpants
2020	"hologram"	Felt, Mr. Grouch	Felt 4 U
2021	"Off Broadway"	Rob Sonic	Latrinalia
2021	"Lice Team, Baby"	Homeboy Sandman	Anjelitu EP
2021	"Field of Dreams"	Your Old Droog + Elzhi	Time
2021	"Barcade"	Atmosphere + MF Doom	Word?
2022	"CD Only Bonus Track"	Open Mike Eagle + Diamond D	Component System with the Auto Reverse
2023	"Waiting Around"	Billy Woods and Kenny Segal	Maps
2023	"Mississippi"	Blockhead	The Aux
2023	"Ponzu Sauce"	Blockhead + Breeze Brewin	The Aux
2023	"Many Headed"	A7PHA	—N/a
2024	"The Return"	Blueprint	Chamber Music 2
2025	”Welcome Home Warrior”	clipping.	Dead Channel Sky

== Production credits ==
Year	Track(s)	Artist	Album
2000	"The Tugboat Complex"	Aesop Rock	Inside OutVol. 1 - A Full Blown Compilation
2000	"Float" "Big Bang" "Garbage" "Fascination" "6B Panorama" "How to be a Carpenter" "Prosperity" "The Mayor and the Crook"	Aesop Rock	Float
2001	"Kill 'em All"	Aesop Rock	Definitive Jux Presents
2001	"Labor" "One Brick" "Battery" "Boombox"	Aesop Rock	Labor Days
2001	"Wise Up"	Aesop Rock	Tags of the Times 3
2002	"Bracket Basher"; "One of Four (Thank You)"	Aesop Rock	Daylight
2002	"Dead Pan"	Aesop Rock	Definitive Jux Presents 2
2003	"Bazooka Tooth" "N.Y. Electric" "Easy" "No Jumper Cables" "Limelighters" "Super Fluke" "Freeze" "The Greatest Pac-Man Victory in History" "Frijoles" "Kill the Messenger" "Mars Attacks"	Aesop Rock	Bazooka Tooth
2004	"All in All" "You're Dead to Me"	Aesop Rock Murs	Definitive Jux Presents III
2004	Dylsexia (Aesop Rock Mix)	Rob	—N/a
2005	"Zodiaccupuncture" "Rickety Rackety" "Food, Clothes, Medicine" "Facemelter"	Aesop Rock	Fast Cars, Danger, Fire and Knives
2005	"Knowledge"	C-Rayz Walz	Year of the Beast
2005	"Junkyard"	Aesop Rock	@2K6
2007	"All Day"	Aesop Rock	Nike + Original Run
2007	"Keep off the Lawn" "Catacomb Kids" "39 Thieves" "Citronella" "Five Fingers"	Aesop Rock	None Shall Pass
2007	"Give Me Love"	Grayskul	Bloody Radio
2008	"Dirt Empire"	Yak Ballz	Scifentology
2008	"Tomorrow Morning"	Aesop Rock, El-P	Ghosts of the Barbary Coast
2009	Album Entire	Felt	Felt 3: A Tribute to Rosie Perez
2009	"Reports of a Possible Kidnapping" {co-produced by El-P} "Worm in Her Vein" "D Up"	The Weathermen Cage Hail Mary Mallon	Def Jux 4
2009	"Strain"	Cage	Depart From Me
2011	"Church Pants" "Garfield" "Grubstake" "Meter Feeder" "Smock" "Breakdance Beach" "Mailbox Baseball" "Knievel"	Hail Mary Mallon	Are You Gonna Eat That?
2011	"Varsity Blues 2"	Murs	Varsity Blues 2
2012	Album Entire	Aesop Rock	Skelethon
2013	"Not Going Anywhere"	Grayskul	Zenith
2014	"Cat Food" "Bug Zapper"	Blockhead Aesop Rock	Cat Food
2014	"Jonathan" "Krill" "Used Cars" "Dollywood" "The Soup" "4AM" "Hang Ten" "Whales" "Merlin" "Picture Day" "King Cone"	Hail Mary Mallon	Bestiary
2014	"Happyland Disco"	Rob Sonic	Alice in Thunderdome
2015	"Bug Zapper"	Aesop Rock	—N/a
2015	"Bar Breaker"	Prof	Liability
2015	"U-Boats"	billy woods	Today I Wrote Nothing
2016	Album Entire	Aesop Rock	The Impossible Kid
2016	"Vigilante Genesis" "Not Sure Why I Came Back" "Graffiti Writer Killed" "Tears of a Drone" "Corner Store Showdown" "The Watering Hole" "Ten Paces"	Blueprint	Vigilante Genesis
2017	"Cheap Shoes"; "Bush League"	billy woods	Known Unknowns
2020	Album Entire	Aesop Rock	Spirit World Field Guide
2021	"Long Legged Larry"	Aesop Rock	—N/a
2021	EP Entire	Homeboy Sandman	Anjlitu
2023	Album Entire (but 1)	Aesop Rock	Integrated Tech Solutions
2025	Album Entire	Aesop Rock	Black Hole Superette

== Original contributions to compilations ==
Year	Tracks	Album	Other contributing artists
2000	"Tugboat Complex"	Inside OutVol. 1 - A Full Blown Compilation	
2000	"The Active Element"	Ropeladder 12''	
2001	"Kill 'em All"	Def Jux Presents	
2001	"Wise Up"	Tags of the Times 3	
2002	"Dead Pan"	Def Jux Presents 2	
2002	"Train Buffer"	Urban Renewal	
2002	"Inner City Hustle"	Embedded Studios Presents: The Bedford Files	L.I.F.E. Long
2003	"Numb (To the Guns)"	Nature Sounds Presents: The Prof. In... Convexed Sampler	
2003	"Dragon Coaster"	Atlantis Sessions & The Deadly Art of All Day Brainstorming	Mojo
2003	"Miss By a Mile"	We Came From Beyond, Vol. 2	Slug and Eyedea
2004	"All in All"	Def Jux Presents 3	
2005	"Preservation"	Wu-Tang Meets the Indie Culture	Del tha Funkee Homosapien
2005	"Junkyard"	NBA 2K6: The Tracks	

== Collaborations ==
=== Lice (with Homeboy Sandman) ===
- Lice (2015)
- Lice Two: Still Buggin' (2016)
- Triple Fat Lice (2017)
- Miami Lice Season Four (2026)

=== Hail Mary Mallon (with Rob Sonic) ===
- Are You Gonna Eat That? (2011)
- Bestiary (2014)

=== The Uncluded (with Kimya Dawson) ===
- Hokey Fright (2013)

=== Malibu Ken (with TOBACCO) ===
- Malibu Ken (2019)

== See also ==
- Definitive Jux discography
