= Spirit World Field Guide =

Studio album by Aesop Rock
- Released: November 13, 2020
- Genre: Hip-hop
- Length: 63:18
- Label: Rhymesayers
- Producers: Aesop Rock; Hanni El Khatib; Leon Michels

Aesop Rock chronology
Freedom Finger (Music from the Game) (2019)	Spirit World Field Guide (2020)	Garbology (2021)

Singles from Spirit World Field Guide
- 1. "The Gates" Released: September 9, 2020; 2. "Pizza Alley" Released: October 16, 2020; 3. "Coveralls" Released: November 13, 2020

Spirit World Field Guide is the eighth studio album by American hip-hop artist Aesop Rock. It was released on November 13, 2020, through Rhymesayers Entertainment. It acts as a "guide" to the Spirit World. The album was preceded by two singles: "The Gates" released on September 9, and "Pizza Alley" released on October 16, 2020. Both were released with music videos directed by Rob Shaw and featuring animation from Justin "Coro" Kaufman, who also designed the album's cover art. A third single and music video, "Coveralls", was released on November 13 alongside the album.

The album was first teased following a series of cryptic Instagram posts. Supporting its "survival guide" theme, the album was available on Rhymesayers Entertainment's official website as a preorder along with items such as a canteen, a pocket knife, and a flint kit being sold. The album peaked at number 54 on the Billboard 200.

== Background and composition ==
"I don't necessarily view it as something you need to listen to front to back in one sitting. In an actual field guide, you'd kinda flip around until you find the section that applies to your current situation. That's how this feels to me."

— Aesop Rock, Flood Magazine

Spirit World Field Guide is a concept album following a narrator through an alternate world, including "hallucinatory images of killer eels, magic spells, and people on the run" and "anecdotes, recipes, survival tips, warnings, maps, [and] drawings".

Following his 2019 collaborative album Malibu Ken with electronic musician Tobacco, Aesop took a break from touring and considered quitting music entirely. He traveled to Peru with bassist James Lynch, which reinvigorated his passion to write songs. This trip produced "Pizza Alley", the first song written for the album. Crediting "the act of being somewhere else" as his source of inspiration, Aesop continued traveling and visited Cambodia and Thailand, which served as inspiration for "Holy Waterfall" and "Sleeper Car", respectively. "Hello from the Spirit World", the spoken-word intro of the album, was the final song recorded, with Aesop originally considering it for a promotional announcement.

Musically, the album's production includes a "mix of electric guitar, laser synths, and crisp drums", while taking inspiration from boom bap, funk, progressive rock, and psychedelic rock.

== Release and promotion ==
In September 2020, Aesop Rock released a music video for "The Gates" directed by Rob Shaw and starring Shaw's children. The video combined live-action footage with animation from Justin "Coro" Kaufman, who also designed the album's cover art. The video was accompanied by an announcement of the album's release date of November 13, 2020, title Spirit World Field Guide, and 21-song track listing. Aesop considered the song "at least a little catchy", and credited it as a breakthrough moment for the project. The next month, he released a second music video for "Pizza Alley", also directed by Shaw and featuring animation from Kaufman. The album was released on November 13, 2020, alongside a third Shaw-directed music video for "Coveralls".

== Reception ==
=== Critical response ===
Professional ratings
Review scores
Source	Rating
AllMusic	4/5 stars
Pitchfork	8.0/10

In a positive review, Pitchfork's Stephen Kearse praised Aesop Rock's "vivid and imagistic" rapping and lyricism that "brims with wonder". Kearse considered the album's production "the best of [Aesop's] career" while specifically highlighting "Gauze" and "Crystal Sword", and considered Spirit World Field Guide to be "the most joyous album [Aesop Rock] has ever made". Tom Breihan of Stereogum referred to the album as "an exploration of one man's crippling dread" with "dense and layered" lyrics, praising the "warm and lush and genuinely funky" sound of Aesop's production. He concluded that Spirit World Field Guide "an album that sounds and works like nothing else", and later ranked it as the ninth-best rap album of 2020.

=== Commercial performance ===
Spirit World Field Guide debuted on the Billboard 200 at number 54, his fourth-highest-charting album. Additionally, it placed on Billboard's Top R&B/Hip-Hop Albums and Independent Albums charts, among others.

== Track listing ==
All tracks are written by Ian Bavitz. All songs produced by Aesop Rock, except "Sleeper Car" produced by Hanni El Khatib and Leon Michels.

Spirit World Field Guide track listing
No.	Title	Length
1.	"Hello from the Spirit World"	2:06
2.	"The Gates"	3:51
3.	"Button Masher"	3:45
4.	"Dog at the Door"	1:28
5.	"Gauze"	3:12
6.	"Pizza Alley"	4:36
7.	"Crystal Sword"	2:20
8.	"Boot Soup"	4:08
9.	"Coveralls"	3:39
10.	"Jumping Coffin"	3:29
11.	"Holy Waterfall"	3:48
12.	"Flies"	0:46
13.	"Salt"	3:37
14.	"Sleeper Car"	3:42
15.	"1 to 10"	0:53
16.	"Attaboy"	3:00
17.	"Kodokushi"	3:53
18.	"Fixed and Dilated"	2:38
19.	"Side Quest"	1:21
20.	"Marble Cake"	4:16
21.	"The Four Winds"	2:50
Total length:		63:18

== Personnel ==
Credits adapted from the album's liner notes.

- Aesop Rock – producer (1–13, 15–21), additional producer (14), executive producer
- Heidi Hopfer – additional vocals (1)
- Grimace Federation – additional instrumentation (2, 6, 8, 9, 16, 17, 21)
- Hanni El Khatib – additional instrumentation (3), producer (14)
- James Lynch – bass (5, 6, 13, 20)
- Homeboy Sandman – additional vocals (8)
- DJ Zone – scratches (10, 13, 17, 18)
- Leon Michels – producer (14)
- Joey Raia – mixing
- Joe LaPorta – mastering
- Kevin Frias – engineering assistance
- Justin "Coro" Kaufman – art, layout
- Alex Everson – project coordinator
- Jessica Daley – project coordinator
- Kevin Beacham – project coordinator
- Brent Sayers – executive producer
- Sean Daley – executive producer

== Charts ==
Chart performance for Spirit World Field Guide
Chart (2020)	Peak position
US Billboard 200	54
US Independent Albums (Billboard)	9
US Top R&B/Hip-Hop Albums (Billboard)	26
US Indie Store Album Sales (Billboard)	5
