= All Day: Nike+ Original Run =

2007 continuous mix by Aesop Rock

Mixtape by Aesop Rock
- Released: February 13, 2007
- Genre: Hip hop
- Length: 44:48
- Label: Nike+ Sport Music
- Producer: Aesop Rock

Aesop Rock chronology
Bazooka Tooth (2003)	All Day: Nike+ Original Run (2007)	None Shall Pass (2007)

Professional ratings
Review scores
Source	Rating
AllMusic	3.5/5 stars
Pitchfork Media	5.9/10
PopMatters	5/10 stars
XLR8R	mixed

All Day: Nike+ Original Run is an original composition written and produced by Aesop Rock, commissioned by Nike for the Original Run series. It was released exclusively at the iTunes Store on February 13, 2007.

Aesop Rock said, "I wanted to create something that evolved enough that the sound was constantly fresh and attractive, as if the runner were moving through a set of differing cities or landscapes".

== Reception ==
Marisa Brown of AllMusic gave the album 3.5 stars out of 5, saying, "it's the production, which is quite excellent, that pushes the music forward, the kind of thing that revisits itself without seeming repetitive, interesting and connected but not unapproachable."

Meanwhile, Jason Crock of Pitchfork Media gave the album a 5.9 out of 10 and said, "[Aesop Rock's] laconic, unhurried approach is one of the few things that work on All Day, leaving me anxious to hear his next project, so long as he doesn't produce the entire thing himself."

Cameron Macdonald of XLR8R said, "there are moments when everything clicks, but his stress-rap rhymes are too fragmented and he overindulges in bugged-out synth wanks."

== Track listing ==
No.	Title	Length
1.	"All Day: Nike+ Original Run (Continuous Mix)"	44:48
