= Zero Dark Thirty (disambiguation) =

Zero Dark Thirty is a film directed by Kathryn Bigelow.

Zero Dark Thirty may also refer to:

- Zero Dark 30, an album by Mike McClure
- "Zero Dark Thirty", a song by Aesop Rock from Skelethon
- Oh dark thirty, American military slang for an unspecified time between midnight and sunrise
