= Appleseed (EP) =

EP by Aesop Rock
- Released: 1999
- Genre: Hip-hop
- Length: 32:07
- Label: self-released
- Producers: Aesop Rock; Omega One; Blockhead

Aesop Rock chronology
Music for Earthworms (1998)	Appleseed (1999)	Float (2000)

Appleseed is an EP by American hip-hop musician Aesop Rock. It was originally self-released in 1999, and reissued via Rhymesayers Entertainment in 2021. Produced by Aesop Rock himself, Omega One, and Blockhead, it features a guest appearance from Doseone. It peaked at number 70 on the Billboard Top Album Sales chart.

== Release ==
The EP was originally self-released on CD-R in 1999. Aesop Rock said: "The first Appleseed CD's were CD-R's I duped at home and sold from my backpack at an MF Doom show at Brownies, which was right below my apartment at the time." He added: "I continued to sell hand-to-hand in NY, while Blockhead started fielding some mail orders from a young internet. People would send us cash or a check, and he'd cut the covers out and mail them off." In 2021, the official reissue version of the EP was released via Rhymesayers Entertainment.

== Critical reception ==
Professional ratings
Review scores
Source	Rating
AllMusic	3.5/5 stars
Exclaim!	favorable
RapReviews	8/10

Paul Simpson of AllMusic gave the EP 3.5 stars out of 5, commenting that "Appleseed's lyrics are more introspective than they might seem at first, even if they're not quite as autobiographical as later Aesop albums like Skelethon and The Impossible Kid, and he hadn't developed his knack for storytelling yet, so the songs are less narrative and closer to aggravated bursts." He added: "Musically, the tracks are relatively laid-back and uncomplicated, barely hinting at the grand leap Aesop would take with the more polished production of his 2001 breakthrough Labor Days, but they serve as a neat time capsule of the late-'90s backpacker rap era." Thomas Quinlan of Exclaim! called it "an amazing collection of songs that may end up being the best EP of the year."

In 2014, Joseph Schafer of Stereogum named it the 7th best Aesop Rock record.

In 2021, Eddie Ugarte of Ghettoblaster Magazine wrote: "The story of Appleseed is also the story of a burgeoning independent hip hop scene that began to flourish in the wake of technological innovations of the era, including quality affordable home recording equipment and the rising availability of CD-R drives, which gave artists the freedom to write, record, and manufacture albums outside of the constraints of a label system."

== Track listing ==
No.	Title	Producer(s)	Length
1.	"Appleseed Intro"	Aesop Rock	1:08
2.	"Dryspell"	Aesop Rock	4:31
3.	"Same Space (The Tugboat Complex Part 2)"	Aesop Rock	3:52
4.	"Sick Friend"	Omega One	4:30
5.	"Hold the Cup"	Aesop Rock	4:58
6.	"1,000 Deaths"	Blockhead	3:43
7.	"Blue in the Face"	Aesop Rock	4:28
8.	"Odessa" (featuring Doseone)	Aesop Rock	4:44
Total length:			32:07

== Personnel ==
Credits adapted from liner notes.

- Aesop Rock – vocals, production (1–3, 5, 7, 8), artwork
- Omega One – turntables (4), production (4)
- Blockhead – production (6)
- Doseone – vocals (8)
- Neal Usatin – artwork

== Charts ==
Chart (2021)	Peak position
US Top Album Sales (Billboard)	70
