= Black Hole Superette =

2025 studio album by Aesop Rock

Studio album by Aesop Rock
- Released: May 30, 2025
- Genre: Hip-hop
- Length: 68:20
- Label: Rhymesayers
- Producer: Aesop Rock

Aesop Rock chronology
| Integrated Tech Solutions (2023) | Black Hole Superette (2025) | I Heard It's a Mess There Too (2025) |

Black Hole Superette is the tenth solo studio album by American hip-hop artist Aesop Rock. It was released on May 30, 2025, through Rhymesayers Entertainment. The album features guest appearances from Armand Hammer, Open Mike Eagle, Homeboy Sandman, Lupe Fiasco, and Hanni El Khatib. It peaked at number 171 on the US Billboard 200.

== Background ==
On April 2, 2025, Aesop announced the album with its guest features. A free game was launched to Steam in promotion, entitled Aesop Rock's Black Hole Superette Experience, where the player explores a fictional convenience store.

== Critical reception ==
Professional ratings
Aggregate scores
| Source | Rating |
|---|---|
| Metacritic | 78/100 |
Review scores
| Source | Rating |
| AllMusic | 4/5 stars |
| Pitchfork | 8/10 |
| Rolling Stone | 3.5/5 stars |

At Metacritic, which assigns a weighted average score out of 100 to reviews from mainstream critics, Black Hole Superette received an average score of 78 based on 7 reviews, indicating "generally favorable" reviews. The AV Club ranked Black Hole Superette the 25th best rap album of 2025.

== Track listing ==
All tracks are written by Ian Bavitz, with guest artists also credited as writers.

Black Hole Superette track listing
| No. | Title | Length |
|---|---|---|
| 1. | "Secret Knock" | 3:32 |
| 2. | "Checkers" | 3:57 |
| 3. | "Movie Night" | 3:20 |
| 4. | "EWR - Terminal A, Gate 20" | 3:48 |
| 5. | "1010Wins" (featuring Armand Hammer) | 3:55 |
| 6. | "So Be It" (featuring Open Mike Eagle) | 3:35 |
| 7. | "Send Help" | 3:47 |
| 8. | "John Something" | 4:17 |
| 9. | "Ice Sold Here" | 2:18 |
| 10. | "Costco" | 3:20 |
| 11. | "Bird School" | 3:44 |
| 12. | "Snail Zero" | 3:16 |
| 13. | "Charlie Horse" (featuring Homeboy Sandman and Lupe Fiasco) | 6:04 |
| 14. | "Steel Wool" | 3:16 |
| 15. | "Black Plums" | 3:24 |
| 16. | "The Red Phone" | 4:18 |
| 17. | "Himalayan Yak Chew" | 4:03 |
| 18. | "Unbelievable Shenanigans" (featuring Hanni El Khatib) | 4:16 |
| Total length: | | 68:20 |

== Personnel ==
Credits adapted from Tidal.

- Aesop Rock – vocals, production, beats
- Joey Raia – mixing
- Joe LaPorta – mastering
- Rob Sonic – vocals (tracks 1, 4, 14)
- Asher Fulero – keyboards (2–4, 6–8, 15), vocals (18)
- Slug – vocals (2, 4)
- Homeboy Sandman – vocals (2, 13, 16)
- Farnell Newton – horn (3)
- Billy Woods – vocals (5)
- Elucid – vocals (5)
- Open Mike Eagle – vocals (6)
- Forest Pond – cuts (9, 11, 13)
- James McNew – bass (9)
- Lupe Fiasco – vocals (13)
- Hanni El Khatib – vocals (18)

== Charts ==
Chart performance for Black Hole Superette
| Chart (2025) | Peak position |
|---|---|
| UK Album Downloads (Official Charts) | 13 |
| UK R&B Albums (Official Charts) | 6 |
| US Billboard 200 | 171 |
| US Independent Albums (Billboard) | 28 |
