= I Heard It's a Mess There Too =

Studio album by Aesop Rock
- Released: October 27, 2025
- Genre: Hip-hop
- Length: 41:09
- Label: Rhymesayers
- Producer: Aesop Rock

Aesop Rock chronology
Black Hole Superette (2025)	I Heard It's a Mess There Too (2025)	Trouble Mountain (2026)

Professional ratings
Review scores
Source	Rating
Laut.de	5/5 stars
Robert Christgau	A
Tom Hull	A−

I Heard It's a Mess There Too is the eleventh solo studio album by American rapper and record producer Aesop Rock. It was released on October 27, 2025 via Rhymesayers Entertainment. Self-produced, the album peaked at number 35 on the Top Album Sales, number 28 on the Top Current Album Sales and number 21 on the Vinyl Albums charts in the United States, and number 65 on the Official Album Downloads Chart in the UK.

== Track listing ==
All tracks are written by Ian Bavitz.

No.	Title	Length
1.	"Crystals and Herbs"	1:31
2.	"The Cut"	4:02
3.	"Full House Pinball"	3:28
4.	"Bag Lunch"	2:38
5.	"Spin to Win"	3:50
6.	"Opossum"	3:49
7.	"Oh My Stars"	3:29
8.	"Potato Leek Soup"	3:40
9.	"Pay the Man"	2:48
10.	"Poly Cotton Blend"	3:55
11.	"Call Home"	4:03
12.	"Sherbert"	3:56
Total length:		41:09

== Personnel ==
- Ian "Aesop Rock" Bavitz – lyrics, vocals, producer, executive producer
- Joey Raia – mixing
- Joe LaPorta – mastering
- Justin "Coro" Kaufman – artwork
- Brent Sayers – executive producer
- Sean "Slug" Daley – executive producer
- Alex Everson – coordinator
- Jordon Daley – coordinator
- Kevin Beacham – coordinator

== Charts ==
Chart (2025)	Peak position
UK Album Downloads (Official Charts)	65
US Top Album Sales (Billboard)	35
US Top Current Album Sales (Billboard)	28
US Vinyl Albums (Billboard)	21
