= The Impossible Kid (album) =

Studio album by Aesop Rock
- Released: April 29, 2016
- Genre: Hip-hop
- Length: 48:32
- Label: Rhymesayers
- Producer: Aesop Rock

Aesop Rock chronology
Skelethon (2012)	The Impossible Kid (2016)	Malibu Ken (2019)

Singles from The Impossible Kid
- 1. "Rings" Released: 2016; 2. "Blood Sandwich" Released: 2016

The Impossible Kid is the seventh studio album by American hip-hop artist Aesop Rock. It was released on April 29, 2016, through Rhymesayers Entertainment. The album was produced by Aesop Rock. The cover art was created by Alex Pardee.

To accompany the release of the album, Rob Shaw directed an abridged shot-for-shot remake of The Shining using small figurines, which was set to the album in its entirety. Additionally, music videos were created for "Rings", "Blood Sandwich", "Lazy Eye", "Dorks", "Kirby", "Shrunk", and "Get Out of the Car"; released eight years after the death of the song's subject and Aesop's good friend, Camu Tao.

== Reception ==
Professional ratings
Aggregate scores
Source	Rating
Metacritic	85/100
Review scores
Source	Rating
AllMusic	4/5 stars
The A.V. Club	B+
Clash	8/10
Consequence of Sound	B+
Exclaim!	8/10
Pitchfork	8.2/10
PopMatters	8/10
RapReviews	10/10
Under the Radar	8/10
Vice (Expert Witness)	A−

At Metacritic, which assigns a weighted average score out of 100 to reviews from mainstream critics, The Impossible Kid received an average score of 85 based on 11 reviews, indicating "universal acclaim".

Kyle Mullin of Exclaim! gave the album an 8 out of 10 and said: "For years, Aesop Rock has been beloved for his ambitious, loquacious lyricism, but on The Impossible Kid, he's reached new artistic heights by using that elaborate wordplay to offer us a simple yet powerful glimpse at his scarred psyche."

== Track listing ==
All songs written and produced by Aesop Rock, except where noted.

No.	Title	Length
1.	"Mystery Fish"	3:09
2.	"Rings"	3:47
3.	"Lotta Years"	1:59
4.	"Dorks"	3:33
5.	"Rabies"	3:06
6.	"Supercell"	3:51
7.	"Blood Sandwich"	4:25
8.	"Get Out of the Car"	1:53
9.	"Shrunk"	3:09
10.	"Kirby"	2:47
11.	"TUFF"	3:51
12.	"Lazy Eye"	2:45
13.	"Defender"	3:11
14.	"Water Tower"	3:51
15.	"Molecules"	3:23

The Impossible Kid bonus tracks
No.	Title	Writer(s)	Producer(s)	Length
16.	"Syrup" (featuring Homeboy Sandman and Open Mike Eagle)	Ian Bavitz; Angel Del Villar; Michael Eagle	Aesop Rock	3:00
17.	"Dorks" (Blockhead Remix)	Bavitz	Blockhead	3:42

== Personnel ==
Credits adapted from the album's liner notes.

=== Musicians ===
- Aesop Rock – lead vocals
- DJ Zone – scratching
- Grimace Federation – synthesizer (1, 2, 4, 5, 7, 10, 13, 14), Rhodes (3), guitar (4, 12), organ (6)
- James Lynch – bass guitar (2)
- Hanni El Khatib – additional vocals (3)
- Rob Sonic – additional vocals (5)
- Allyson Baker – guitar (7)
- Carnage the Executioner – beatboxing (11)
- Kimya Dawson – additional vocals (11)
- Chuck D – additional vocals (12)
- Onry Ozzborn – additional vocals (13)

=== Production ===
- Aesop Rock – executive producer
- Brent Sayers – executive producer
- Slug – executive producer, project coordinator
- Joe LaPorta – mastering
- Joey Raia – mixing
- Skye Rossi – project coordinator

=== Design ===
- Jason Cook – project coordinator
- Alex Pardee – artwork, layout

== Charts ==
=== Weekly charts ===
Chart (2016)	Peak position
US Billboard 200	30
US Independent Albums (Billboard)	2
US Top R&B/Hip-Hop Albums (Billboard)	3

=== Year-end charts ===
Chart (2016)	Position
US Top R&B/Hip-Hop Albums (Billboard)	91
