= Garbology (album) =

2021 studio album by Aesop Rock & Blockhead

Studio album by Aesop Rock and Blockhead
- Released: November 12, 2021
- Genre: Hip-hop
- Length: 50:55
- Label: Rhymesayers
- Producer: Blockhead

Aesop Rock and Blockhead chronology
Garbology (2021)	Trouble Mountain (2026)

Aesop Rock chronology
Spirit World Field Guide (2020)	Garbology (2021)	Integrated Tech Solutions (2023)

Blockhead chronology
Space Werewolves Will Be the End of Us All (2021)	Garbology (2021)	The Aux (2023)

Singles from Garbology
- 1. "Jazz Hands" Released: October 13, 2021

Garbology is a collaborative studio album by rapper Aesop Rock and producer Blockhead. It was released through Rhymesayers Entertainment on November 12, 2021. The album was preceded by one single, "Jazz Hands", which was released on October 13, 2021, alongside a music video directed by Rob Shaw.

== Background ==
Prior to this album, Aesop Rock and Blockhead had been longtime collaborators; Blockhead had contributed production to each of Aesop's first five albums, and Aesop had provided vocals on several of Blockhead's solo tracks. However, before the two artists started work on this album, they had never collaborated on a full-length project together.

The artists began working in this album in early 2020, as Aesop was processing the death of a close friend, the skateboarder Kurt Hayashi. This origin influenced the title of the album: Aesop has stated that he sees parallels between the field of garbology and the idea of "picking up the pieces after a loss or period of intense unrest." The title was also chosen as a reference to sampling, due to the way in which samples reuse and repurpose music from earlier eras.

== Critical response ==
Professional ratings
Aggregate scores
Source	Rating
Metacritic	79/100
Review scores
Source	Rating
AllMusic	3.5/5 stars
Pitchfork	7.8/10
PopMatters	7/10
Stereogum	Favorable

At Metacritic, which assigns a weighted average score out of 100 to reviews from mainstream critics, Garbology received an average score of 79 based on 5 reviews, indicating "generally favorable reviews".

A PopMatters review praised Aesop's rapping on Garbology as "sound[ing] on fire in a way he hasn't in years," with lyrical content characterized as "surrealistic, funny, and sometimes downright haunting". A review on Stereogum, meanwhile, described Aesop's writing as feeling "alive" despite themes of "sadness and anger and boredom and free-floating dread". Aesop's performance was also noted for versatility in his vocal delivery; Pitchfork described him as utilizing "increasingly complex" flows with "subtle vocal variations", while Stereogum described him as rapping "more deliberately" and "finding new cadences." Blockhead's production was characterized as minimalist; Pitchfork labels it as "musically spare" and as employing "an abundance of negative space," while PopMatters describes "desolate" production that "focused on keeping the spotlight on Bavitz". The Stereogum review placed less emphasis on the minimalism, however, instead identifying the album's main musical motifs as "deep grooves and cymbal-splashes and squelchy guitars" that were reminiscent of "junkyard blues".

Comparing the release to Aesop Rock's previous album, AllMusic's Paul Simpson claimed that "Garbology isn't nearly as complex or conceptually driven as 2020's Spirit World Field Guide, but it still contains an abundance of memorable lyrics, and demonstrates Aesop's talent for spinning fantastic stories out of nothing."

== Track listing ==
All tracks are written by Ian Bavitz; "All Day Breakfast" co-written by Angel Del Villar II.

No.	Title	Length
1.	"The Only Picture"	0:46
2.	"Jazz Hands"	3:25
3.	"Wolf Piss"	3:33
4.	"Legerdemain"	4:33
5.	"Difficult"	4:06
6.	"All the Smartest People"	2:06
7.	"Oh Fudge"	3:03
8.	"More Cycles"	4:09
9.	"Flamingo Pink"	3:56
10.	"All Day Breakfast" (with Homeboy Sandman)	2:54
11.	"Fizz"	4:38
12.	"That is Not a Wizard"	4:32
13.	"The Sea"	4:09
14.	"Abandoned Malls"	5:05
Total length:		50:55

== Personnel ==
- Ian Bavitz – vocals
- Tony Simon – production
- Joe LaPorta – mastering
- Joey Raia – mixing
- Justin Coro – artwork, layout
- Justin Kaufman – artwork, layout
- Billy Woods – additional vocals (track 4)
- Rob Sonic – additional vocals (track 9)

== Charts ==
Chart performance for Garbology
Chart (2021)	Peak position
UK Independent Albums (Official Charts)	47
