= First of a Living Breed =

Studio album by Homeboy Sandman
- Released: September 18, 2012
- Genre: Hip-hop
- Length: 46:22
- Label: Stones Throw Records
- Producers: Jonwayne; Oddisee; J57; Howard Lloyd; Invisible Think; 6th Sense; RTNC; 2 Hungry Bros.; Reality; Oh No

Homeboy Sandman chronology
The Good Sun (2010)	First of a Living Breed (2012)	Hallways (2014)

First of a Living Breed is the fourth studio album by American rapper Homeboy Sandman. It was released by Stones Throw Records on September 18, 2012. It peaked at number 75 on the Billboard Top R&B/Hip-Hop Albums chart.

== Critical reception ==
Professional ratings
Aggregate scores
Source	Rating
Metacritic	77/100
Review scores
Source	Rating
AllMusic	4/5 stars
BBC	favorable
Robert Christgau	A−
Exclaim!	8/10
Pitchfork	7.1/10
PopMatters	4/10 stars
Potholes in My Blog	3.5/5 stars
The Skinny	4/5 stars

At Metacritic, which assigns a weighted average score out of 100 to reviews from mainstream critics, the album received an average score of 77, based on 8 reviews, indicating "generally favorable reviews".

NPR Music included it in the "50 Favorite Albums of 2012" list. The Village Voice placed it at number 5 on the "Ten Best New York City Rap Albums of 2012" list.

== Track listing ==
No.	Title	Producer(s)	Length
1.	"Rain"	Jonwayne	3:14
2.	"Whatchu Want from Me?"	Oddisee	3:49
3.	"Couple Bars (Honey, Sugar, Darling, Sweetie, Baby, Boo)"	J57	3:21
4.	"Sputnik"	Howard Lloyd	3:58
5.	"Illuminati"	J57	3:08
6.	"4 Corners"	Invisible Think	3:46
7.	"For the Kids"	6th Sense	3:39
8.	"Cedar and Sedgwick"	RTNC	2:00
9.	"Mine All Mine"	2 Hungry Bros.	2:35
10.	"Not Really"	Jonwayne	4:18
11.	"The Ancient"	Reality	3:30
12.	"Eclipsed"	RTNC	1:55
13.	"First of a Living Breed"	Oh No	4:12
14.	"Let's Get 'Em"	RTNC	2:53
Total length:			46:22

== Personnel ==
Credits adapted from liner notes.

- Homeboy Sandman – vocals
- Jonwayne – production (1, 10)
- Oddisee – production (2)
- J57 – production (3, 5)
- Howard Lloyd – production (4)
- Invisible Think – production (6)
- 6th Sense – production (7)
- RTNC – production (8, 12, 14)
- 2 Hungry Bros. – production (9)
- Reality – production (11)
- Oh No – production (13)
- Jeff Jank – sleeve design
- Joel Frijhoff – photography

== Charts ==
Chart	Peak position
US Top R&B/Hip-Hop Albums (Billboard)	75
