= Party Fun Action Committee =

American hip hop group

- Also known as: PFAC
- Origin: United States
- Genres: Hip hop
- Years active: 2003
- Label: Definitive Jux
- Members: Blockhead; Jer

Party Fun Action Committee is an American hip hop group consisting of Blockhead and Jer.

== History ==
Party Fun Action Committee released the first studio album, Let's Get Serious, on Definitive Jux in 2003. The album peaked at number 7 on the CMJ Hip-Hop chart. It received favorable reviews from AllMusic, The A.V. Club, and Stylus Magazine.

The group was featured on Aesop Rock's song "Cook It Up", which appeared on his 2003 album, Bazooka Tooth.

== Discography ==
Studio albums

- Let's Get Serious (2003)

Singles

- "Beer" (2003)

Guest appearances

- Aesop Rock - "Cook It Up" from Bazooka Tooth (2003)
