= Smashy Trashy =

Studio album by S.A. Smash
- Released: June 3, 2003
- Genre: Hip-hop
- Length: 65:48
- Label: Definitive Jux
- Producer: Przm; Camu Tao; El-P; Ese & Hipsta; Blockhead; Walter Rocktight

Singles from Smashy Trashy
- 1. "Last Night" Released: 2003; 2. "Gangsta" / "Smash TV" Released: 2003; 3. "Illy" / "Niggales Cage" Released: 2003

Smashy Trashy is the only studio album by American hip-hop duo S.A. Smash. It was released by Definitive Jux on June 3, 2003. It peaked at number 14 on CMJ's Hip-Hop chart.

== Critical reception ==
Professional ratings
Review scores
Source	Rating
AllMusic	2.5/5 stars
CMJ New Music Monthly	favorable
Pitchfork	4.2/10
XLR8R	favorable

John Bush of AllMusic wrote, "The duo doesn't even stick to a single performance style, ranging from sex-crazed bragging to satirical gangster posturing and down-south balling to underground-type weirdness." Rollie Pemberton of Pitchfork commented that "The reason this album doesn't work is because they don't have the emotional severity and nonchalant allure of commercial artists, they don't have the intelligence and song structure of underground artists, and they can't write a chorus to save their lives."

In 2015, Chaz Kangas of City Pages included "Love to F*ck" on the "Five Aesop Rock Rarities You Might Have Missed" list.

== Track listing ==
No.	Title	Producer(s)	Length
1.	"Smash TV" (featuring Cage)	Przm	4:15
2.	"Robot"	Camu Tao	3:02
3.	"Clout"	Camu Tao	4:28
4.	"Get Home"	Camu Tao	3:19
5.	"Illy"	El-P	4:05
6.	"Weird"	Ese & Hipsta	2:44
7.	"Slide on 'Em (Escapade)" (featuring Vast Aire)	Camu Tao	4:48
8.	"Love to Hate"	Walter Rocktight	3:46
9.	"A.A."	Camu Tao	2:54
10.	"Jerseyed Out"	Przm	2:44
11.	"Love to F*ck" (featuring Aesop Rock)	Blockhead	6:01
12.	"I Know What You're Thinking"	Przm	3:07
13.	"Last Night"	Camu Tao	3:53
14.	"Body"	Camu Tao	3:37
15.	"Bang"	Camu Tao	4:10
16.	"Gangsta"	Camu Tao	3:51
17.	"Spot Tonight"	Camu Tao	4:57
