= Jeremy Fish =

American illustrator

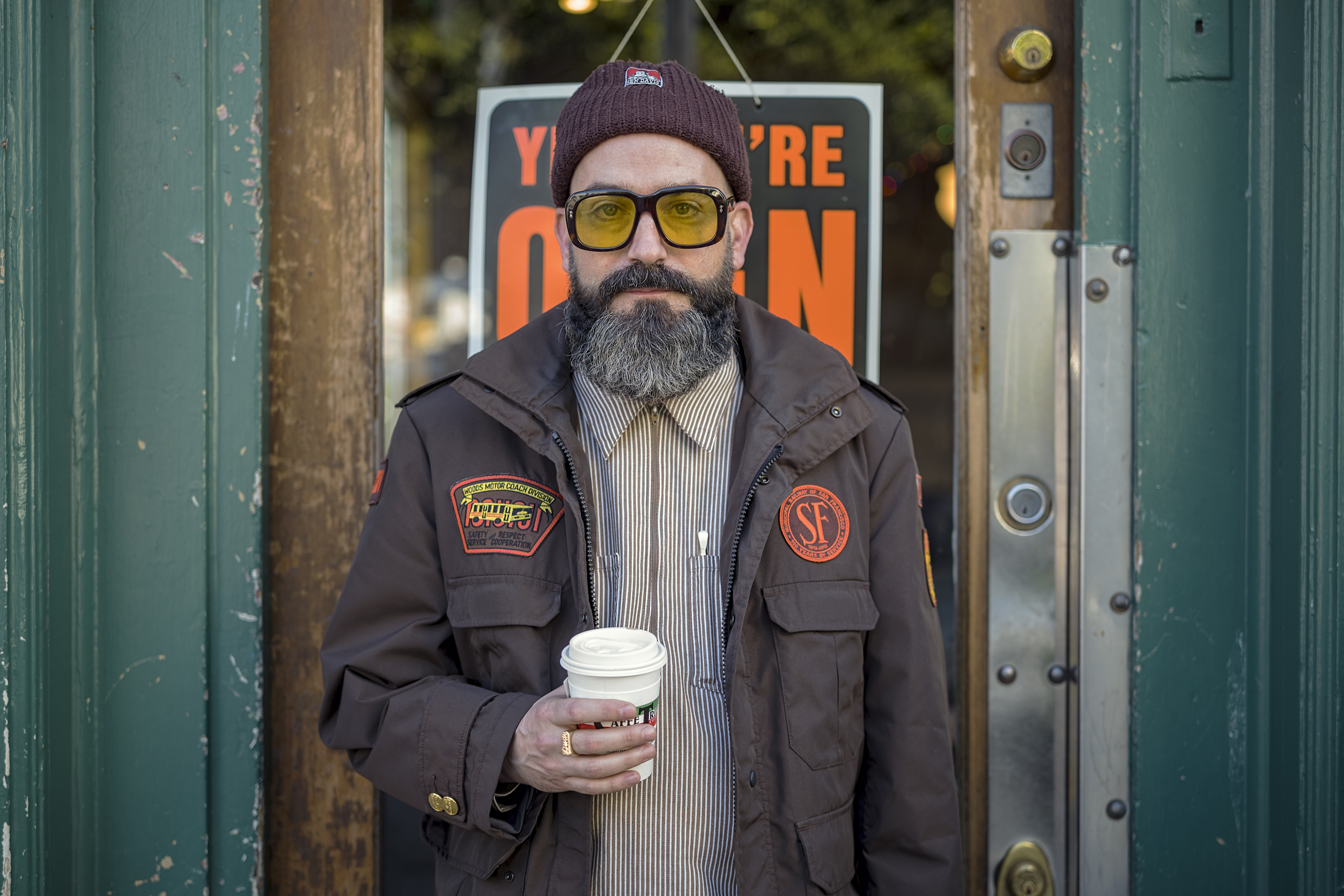
- Jeremy Fish in San Francisco, 2017.
- Born: Jeremy Dan Fish; 1974 (age 51–52); Albany, New York, U.S.
- Education: San Francisco Art Institute
- Known for: Art, Illustration
- Spouse: Jayde Cardinalli (? – 2019)

Jeremy Dan Fish (born 1974) is an American illustrator and artist. He lives and works in the North Beach neighborhood of San Francisco.

== Early life and education ==
Fish was born in Albany, New York. He lived in upstate New York in Saratoga Springs, until he moved to San Francisco in 1994 to attend art school. He received his BFA degree in Interdisciplinary Studies from the San Francisco Art Institute (SFAI) in 1997. After graduating he took a job screen printing for the skateboard industry.

== Work ==
In 2006, Nike Skateboarding released a version of the Air Classic shoe with artwork designed by Fish which they later recalled because Nike was not satisfied with the embossing.

Fish has collaborated with Aesop Rock since the latter's move to San Francisco in 2005. In the fall of 2006, the pair created a book entitled The Next Best Thing, which also included a 7-inch picture disk. Fish later created the artwork for Aesop Rock's fifth studio album None Shall Pass, released by Definitive Jux. In 2009, they again teamed up to release Ghosts of the Barbary Coast on Definitive Jux.

In 2008, DRAGO staged Rome-antic Delusions, an exhibition of Fish's paintings, drawings and screen prints. The exhibition was held in Rome, and much of the art was created there as well.

His Silly Pink Bunnies (2011) sculpture and mural was at the corner of Haight Street and Laguna Street in San Francisco, featuring a large, pink rabbit head widely opening its mouth to reveal a skull. Silly Pink Bunnies was removed in 2013 due to construction. A Kickstarter crowdfunding campaign was started and raised over $50,000 to erect a permanent bronze bunny near the same location in the future. The sculpture eventually found a home at the Haight Street Art Center.

In 2013 he worked on creating a custom pinball machine for a project called "Bring Back The Arcade" with Tilt Warning Customs.

In 2015, Fish was named San Francisco City Hall’s first Artist-in Residence and an opening O Glorious City was held in November 2015. Additionally an exhibition book of his work, "O Glorious City: A Love Letter to San Francisco" was published.

In 2020, Anchor Steam Brewery partnered with Fish during the COVID shut down to create "Stay Strong, San Francisco" signs and tee-shirts to benefit the Bartender Emergency Assistance Program.

== Personal life ==
Much of Fish's work has been conducted on a barter system. Exchanging artwork and murals for meals at restaurants and for an art studio, but remaining adaptive and moving his art studio based on the building vacancy. He has lived in many alternative spaces to save money, including in a closet.

In late 2014, Fish suffered a brain aneurysm that required surgery.

He was previously married to artist, Jayde Fish (née Cardinalli). The couple divorced in 2019 in Los Angeles, California.

== Publications ==
- Fish, Jeremy (2017). O Glorious City: A Love Letter to San Francisco. San Francisco, California: Chronicle Books. ISBN 978-1452156040.
- Fish, Jeremy (2014). Happily Ever After: The Artwork of Jeremy Fish. San Francisco, California: Upper Playground. ISBN 978-1584235804.
- Fish, Jeremy (2008). Once Upon a Time: Paintings, Drawings, and Tall Tales. San Francisco, California: Upper Playground. ISBN 978-0979086298.
- Fish, Jeremy (2008). Rome-antic Delusions. Rome, Italy: Drago. ISBN 978-8888493312.
- Fish, Jeremy (2004). I'm With Stupid (art exhibition). San Francisco, California: Fifty 24SF.
