= Malibu Ken (album) =

Studio album by Aesop Rock and TOBACCO are Malibu Ken
- Released: January 18, 2019
- Recorded: 2018
- Genre: Hip-hop
- Length: 34:34
- Label: Rhymesayers
- Producer: Tobacco

Aesop Rock chronology
The Impossible Kid (2016)	Malibu Ken (2019)	Freedom Finger (Music from the Game) (2020)

Tobacco chronology
Ripe & Majestic (Instrumental Rarities & Unreleased Beats) (2017)	Malibu Ken (2019)	Hot Wet & Sassy (2020)

Singles from Malibu Ken
- 1. "Acid King" Released: November 20, 2018; 2. "Corn Maze" Released: December 18, 2018

Malibu Ken is the debut studio album of American hip-hop duo Malibu Ken, composed of rapper Aesop Rock and producer Tobacco. It was released on January 18, 2019, through Rhymesayers Entertainment to generally positive reviews.

== History ==
In 2007, Tobacco's band Black Moth Super Rainbow opened for part of a North American tour headlined by Aesop Rock. According to Aesop, he and Tobacco had wanted to work together on a project since their meeting during this tour, with Aesop calling Tobacco's production "something special". The following year, Aesop featured on the track "Dirt" from Tobacco's debut album Fucked Up Friends. In November 2018, the pair announced that they were releasing their debut album under the moniker Malibu Ken in January 2019, and released the album's first single "Acid King" and its accompanying music video at the same time. The second single, "Corn Maze", released the following month, also with a music video. On January 18, 2019, Malibu Ken was released by Rhymesayers Entertainment.

== Critical reception ==
Professional ratings
Aggregate scores
Source	Rating
Metacritic	76/100
Review scores
Source	Rating
The 405	7/10
AllMusic	3.5/5 stars
Highsnobiety	5/5 stars
laut.de	4/5 stars
Pitchfork	7.7/10
Sputnikmusic	4/5 stars
Vice	A−

Malibu Ken received generally positive reviews from music critics. On Metacritic, which assigns a normalized rating out of 100 to reviews from mainstream publications, the album received an average score of 76, based on seven reviews. Evan Rytlewski of Pitchfork praised the album for focusing on Aesop Rock's sense of humor, saying, "If [Aesop] just needed the right producer to highlight that wit, he's found a choice one in Tobacco". He positively referenced many of Aesop's lyrics, particularly on "Tuesday", "Churro", and "Acid King", and commended the album for being "more fun than most of" Aesop's discography. Paul Simpson of AllMusic complimented the chemistry between Tobacco and Aesop, saying, "Tobacco's music often seems disturbed and damaged yet somehow cool and carefree, and his style is so compatible with Aesop's that it's hard to imagine him working with any other rapper" and calling them "a fitting match for each other".

Channing Freeman of Sputnikmusic called Aesop's flow "chameleon-like" and drew attention to his unique delivery choice of lyrical topics, including eagles killing a cat on "Churro" and the story of teenage murderer Ricky Kasso on "Acid King". He criticized the album's formulaic qualities near its end and compared it negatively to The Impossible Kid, but concluded that "it works perfectly despite the predictability". Kyle Kohner of The 405 described the project as "quite unnerving and even extraterrestrial", praising its "comically dark and foreboding atmosphere". He compliments Tobacco's "retrofuturist" production, calling it "an influx of psychedelic mania that ends up enhancing his counterpart’s festering lyrical voyages". Adam Finley of PopMatters also praised Tobacco's production, specifically on "Tuesday" and "Sword Box", and likened it to "an acid trip come to life" when paired with Aesop's lyrics. He shared Rytlewski's view that Aesop is "funny as hell when he wants to be", and that the album highlights his "silly" side. He did, however, criticize the production on "Churro", saying that it "overwhelms and ultimately detracts from the lyrics".

== Track listing ==
All tracks are written by Ian Bavitz.

No.	Title	Length
1.	"Corn Maze"	3:23
2.	"Tuesday"	3:30
3.	"Save Our Ship"	3:29
4.	"Sword Box"	4:01
5.	"Dog Years"	3:05
6.	"Acid King"	3:32
7.	"Suicide Big Gulp"	3:30
8.	"1+1=13"	3:46
9.	"Churro"	2:27
10.	"Purple Moss"	3:51
Total length:		34:34

== Personnel ==
Malibu Ken

- Aesop Rock – vocals, executive production
- Tobacco – production, mixing

Additional contributors

- Joe LaPorta – mastering
- Joey Raia – mixing
- GUNSHO – artwork, layout
- Sean Daley – executive production
- Brent Sayers – executive production

== Charts ==
Chart (2019)	Peak position
US Billboard 200	176
US Independent Albums (Billboard)	6
US Top Album Sales (Billboard)	19
US Indie Store Album Sales (Billboard)	4
US Vinyl Albums (Billboard)	7
