= Kool Herc: Fertile Crescent =

EP by Homeboy Sandman
- Released: May 14, 2013
- Genre: Hip-hop
- Length: 26:02
- Label: Stones Throw Records
- Producer: El RTNC

Kool Herc: Fertile Crescent is an EP by American rapper Homeboy Sandman. It was released by Stones Throw Records in 2013. Music videos were created for "Peace & Love" and "Men Are Mortal".

== Critical reception ==
Professional ratings
Aggregate scores
Source	Rating
Metacritic	85/100
Review scores
Source	Rating
Exclaim!	7/10
HipHopDX	4.5/5
Potholes in My Blog	4/5 stars
RapReviews.com	7/10
Robert Christgau	B+
Spin	7/10

At Metacritic, which assigns a weighted average score out of 100 to reviews from mainstream critics, the EP received an average score of 85, based on 5 reviews, indicating "universal acclaim".

Spin placed it at number 35 on the "Best Hip-Hop Albums of 2013" list. HipHopDX included it in the "Top 25 Albums of 2013" list.

== Track listing ==
No.	Title	Length
1.	"My Brothers"	3:50
2.	"Oh, the Horror"	2:23
3.	"Lonely People"	3:03
4.	"Dag, Philly Too"	2:53
5.	"Moon"	3:45
6.	"Men Are Mortal"	3:45
7.	"Peace & Love"	3:11
8.	"I"	4:30
Total length:		26:22

== Personnel ==
Credits adapted from liner notes.

- Homeboy Sandman – vocals
- El RNTC – production
- Dave Dar – engineering
- Jeff Jank – art direction
- Tyke Witness AWR – artwork
