= None Shall Pass =

Studio album by Aesop Rock
- Released: August 28, 2007
- Genre: Hip-hop
- Length: 63:45
- Label: Definitive Jux
- Producer: Aesop Rock; Blockhead; El-P; Rob Sonic

Aesop Rock chronology
Fast Cars, Danger, Fire and Knives (2005)	None Shall Pass (2007)	Skelethon (2012)

Singles from None Shall Pass
- 1. "None Shall Pass" Released: 2007; 2. "Coffee" Released: 2007

Professional ratings
Aggregate scores
Source	Rating
Metacritic	74/100
Review scores
Source	Rating
AllMusic	4/5 stars
The A.V. Club	B−
BBC	favorable
Entertainment Weekly	A−
HipHopDX	4.0/5
Pitchfork Media	7.5/10
PopMatters	7/10 stars
Slant Magazine	4.5/5 stars
Spin	favorable
Tiny Mix Tapes	4/5 stars

None Shall Pass is the fifth studio album by American hip-hop artist Aesop Rock. It was released on Definitive Jux on August 28, 2007.

== Music ==
The album features production by Blockhead, El-P, Rob Sonic, and Aesop Rock himself. The album features more live instrumentation than Aesop's previous work, including guitars by his then-wife Allyson Baker of the Dirty Ghosts; other instruments used on the album include bass and drums. Guest appearances include DJ Big Wiz, Cage, Breeze Brewin, El-P, Rob Sonic, and John Darnielle of The Mountain Goats. The album's artwork was done by Jeremy Fish.

In the leadup to the release of None Shall Pass, Aesop stated that his goal with the album was to increase his focus on storytelling: "I wanted to capture certain parts of my life, like when I used to skateboard a lot or when I was at junior high or when I was a kid. I want to almost take myself out of the equation, I didn't want to rap about 'me me me', I wanted it [to be] more visual and paint pictures of things."

== Release ==
Following its release, None Shall Pass debuted at number 50 on the U.S. Billboard 200 chart, selling about 13,000 copies in its first week through independent hip-hop label Definitive Jux.

== Track listing ==
All tracks are written by Ian Bavitz, unless otherwise noted.

No.	Title	Writer(s)	Producer(s)	Length
1.	"Keep Off the Lawn"		Aesop Rock	3:45
2.	"None Shall Pass"		Blockhead	4:03
3.	"Catacomb Kids"		Aesop Rock	4:07
4.	"Bring Back Pluto"		Blockhead; Aesop Rock^{[a]}	4:29
5.	"Fumes"		Blockhead	5:00
6.	"Getaway Car" (with Cage and Breeze Brewin)	Bavitz; Christian Palko; Paul Smith	Blockhead; Aesop Rock^{[a]}	3:15
7.	"39 Thieves"		Aesop Rock	4:15
8.	"The Harbor Is Yours"		Blockhead; Aesop Rock^{[a]}	3:58
9.	"Citronella"		Aesop Rock	4:53
10.	"Gun for the Whole Family" (with El-P)	Bavitz; Jaime Meline	El-P	3:53
11.	"Five Fingers"		Aesop Rock; Blockhead^{[a]}	4:06
12.	"No City"		Blockhead; El-P^{[a]}	4:28
13.	"Dark Heart News" (with Rob Sonic)	Bavitz; Robert Smith	Rob Sonic	3:59
14.	"Coffee" (with John Darnielle)	Bavitz; Darnielle	Blockhead^{[b]}	9:34
Total length:				63:45

Bonus Edition
No.	Title	Producer(s)	Length
15.	"None Shall Pass - DJ Big Wiz Megablast Mix"	DJ Big Wiz	23:34
Total length:			87:19

Notes

- ^{^[a]} signifies an additional producer
- ^{^[b]} Blockhead is credited for producing "Coffee", but Aesop Rock produced the hidden track "Pigs", which starts at 5:15.

== Personnel ==
Contributing artists

- Allyson Baker – guitar (tracks 1, 3, 8, 12 and 14)
- Carson Binks – bass guitar (tracks 3 and 8)
- Derek Layes – bass guitar (track 4)
- Big Hollis – additional vocals (track 1)
- Camu Tao – additional vocals (track 1)
- Rob Sonic – additional vocals (tracks 1 and 8)
- El-P – additional vocals (track 7)
- DJ Big Wiz – scratching (all tracks except 10)

Production

- Ken Heitmueller – mastering
- Joey Raia – mixing
- Jeremy Fish – artwork, layout, design

== Charts ==
Chart (2007)	Peak position
US Billboard 200	50
US Top R&B/Hip-Hop Albums (Billboard)	35
