= Integrated Tech Solutions =

2023 studio album by Aesop Rock

Studio album by Aesop Rock
- Released: November 10, 2023
- Length: 64:01
- Label: Rhymesayers
- Producer: Aesop Rock

Aesop Rock chronology
Garbology (2021)	Integrated Tech Solutions (2023)	Black Hole Superette (2025)

Singles from Integrated Tech Solutions
- 1. "Mindful Solutionism" Released: September 14, 2023; 2. "By the River" Released: October 5, 2023; 3. "Infinity Fill Goose Down" Released: October 26, 2023

Integrated Tech Solutions is the ninth solo studio album by American hip hop artist Aesop Rock. It was released on November 10, 2023, through Rhymesayers, and contains collaborations with Billy Woods, Hanni El Khatib, Rob Sonic, Nikki Jean, and Lealani Teano.

== Background ==
Aesop Rock announced the album on September 14, 2023, and released a music video for "Mindful Solutionism", the lead single of the album. On October 5, Aesop released "By the River", the second single of the album, and three weeks later, he released "Infinity Fill Goose Down", the third single for the album.

== Music ==
Integrated Tech Solutions has been characterized as a "loose concept album" that explores technology and consumerism. It also features narratives inspired by Aesop's own life experiences, leading the album's prevailing mood to be described as "reflective".

Lead single "Mindful Solutionism" discusses the history of technological advancement, including its harms. Conversely, the album's second single – "By the River" – features "soft percussion and a jazzy horn" and explores Aesop's appreciation of rivers and his memories of deceased friend Camu Tao. "Living Curfew", in which Aesop and featured artist Billy Woods describe the feel of cities at different times of day, includes production that has been likened to trip hop. "Aggressive Steven" tells the story of Aesop's encounter with a home invader and reflects on society's treatment of mental illness; other storytelling tracks are more lighthearted, such as "100 Feet Tall", in which Aesop recounts a childhood experience meeting Mr. T at a restaurant. "On Failure" is a spoken word track in which Aesop considers the life and legacy of Vincent van Gogh.

== Critical reception ==
Professional ratings
Aggregate scores
Source	Rating
Metacritic	84/100
Review scores
Source	Rating
AllMusic	4/5 stars
The Observer	4/5 stars
Pitchfork	8.0/10
RapReviews	8/10
Slant	3.5/5 stars

At Metacritic, which assigns a weighted average score out of 100 to reviews from mainstream critics, Integrated Tech Solutions received an average score of 84 based on 7 reviews, indicating "universal acclaim".

Aesop's writing on the album received particular praise, with Paul Simpson of AllMusic characterizing him as "a master of telling playfully outlandish tales". Stephen Kearse of Pitchfork was similarly approving, noting that "elite technique is clearly second nature for [Aesop] at this point" and describing Integrated Tech Solutions as containing "some of his most fully realized songs". Comparing this record to Aesop's earlier work, reviewers have described him as adopting a "more conversational than combative" delivery, as well as "rein[ing] in his tendencies toward word salad". Critics also praised the detailed storytelling that occurs throughout the record.

The production on Integrated Tech Solutions also achieved acclaim. Kitty Empire of The Observer described Aesop's beats on the album as "bouncy retro production that crackles with vim", and Kearse described it as "accomplished and purposeful" work that "emphasize[s] rhythm as much as texture". Reviewers identified the major elements of the production as including "funky boom-bap with touches of psych-rock guitar", as well as "bubbling synthesizers and turntable scratches".

== Track listing ==
All tracks are written by Ian Bavitz, with guest artists also credited as writers.

Integrated Tech Solutions track listing
No.	Title	Length
1.	"The ITS Way"	0:49
2.	"Mindful Solutionism"	3:34
3.	"Infinity Fill Goose Down"	3:32
4.	"Living Curfew" (featuring Billy Woods)	3:51
5.	"Pigeonometry"	3:32
6.	"Kyanite Toothpick" (featuring Hanni El Khatib)	4:09
7.	"100 Feet Tall"	4:13
8.	"Salt and Pepper Squid"	4:10
9.	"Time Moves Differently Here"	3:48
10.	"Aggressive Steven"	5:18
11.	"Bermuda" (featuring Lealani Teano)	3:17
12.	"By the River"	2:38
13.	"All City Nerve Map"	3:54
14.	"Forward Compatibility Engine" (featuring Rob Sonic)	3:52
15.	"On Failure"	1:59
16.	"Solid Gold"	2:25
17.	"Vititus"	4:08
18.	"Black Snow" (featuring Nikki Jean)	4:52
Total length:		64:01

== Charts ==
Chart performance for Integrated Tech Solutions
Chart (2023)	Peak position
UK Album Downloads (OCC)	42
UK R&B Albums (OCC)	12
US Billboard 200	169
US Independent Albums (Billboard)	27
