= Bazooka Tooth =

Studio album by Aesop Rock
- Released: September 23, 2003
- Genre: Hip-hop
- Length: 70:05
- Label: Definitive Jux
- Producers: Aesop Rock; Blockhead; El-P

Aesop Rock chronology
Daylight (2002)	Bazooka Tooth (2003)	Fast Cars, Danger, Fire and Knives (2005)

Bazooka Tooth is the fourth studio album by American hip-hop artist Aesop Rock. It was released on Definitive Jux in 2003.

== Critical reception ==
Professional ratings
Aggregate scores
Source	Rating
Metacritic	74/100
Review scores
Source	Rating
AllMusic	3/5 stars
Alternative Press	4/5
Blender	4/5 stars
Entertainment Weekly	A−
HipHopDX	7.5/10
Los Angeles Times	2.5/4 stars
Mojo	3/5 stars
Pitchfork	8.2/10
Rolling Stone	3/5 stars
Stylus Magazine	B

Bazooka Tooth received generally favorable reviews from critics. Metacritic gave the album a score of 74 out of 100, based on 16 reviews.

Rollie Pemberton of Pitchfork called Bazooka Tooth "another strong outing from one of underground hip-hop's most talented, thanks in no small part to its unprecedented wealth of lyrical depth and individual production style." Thomas Quinlan of Exclaim! commented that "Aesop drops abstract poetry, heartfelt stories and new millennial b-boyisms in his gruff monotone flow." Francis Henville of Stylus Magazine noted that "the beats feel somewhat restrained, lethargic and lazy" and "they are perfectly suited to Aesop's limpid down-tempo rhymes."

Meanwhile, John Bush of AllMusic felt that Bazooka Tooth lacks "the catchy, sample-driven flavor" of Labor Days. David Morris of PopMatters gave the album an unfavorable review and said, "Bazooka Tooth is almost a textbook example of what happens when a previously struggling artist gets a handful of success".

In 2013, Danny Brown named it one of his 25 favorite albums.

== Track listing ==
All songs written and produced by Aesop Rock, unless otherwise noted.

No.	Title	Writer(s)	Producer	Length
1.	"Bazooka Tooth"			2:25
2.	"N.Y. Electric"			5:10
3.	"Easy"			5:01
4.	"No Jumper Cables"			5:06
5.	"Limelighters" (featuring Camp Lo)	Bavitz; Saladine Wallace; Salahadeen Wilds		4:33
6.	"Super Fluke"			4:51
7.	"Cook It Up" (featuring Party Fun Action Committee)	Bavitz; Jeremy Gibson; Tony Simon	Blockhead	3:45
8.	"Freeze"			5:32
9.	"We're Famous" (featuring El-P)	Bavitz; Jaime Meline	El-P	6:21
10.	"Babies With Guns"		Blockhead	5:07
11.	"The Greatest Pac-Man Victory in History"			4:48
12.	"Frijoles"			3:48
13.	"11:35" (featuring Mr. Lif)	Bavitz; Jeffrey Haynes	Blockhead	4:23
14.	"Kill the Messenger"			4:54
15.	"Mars Attacks"			4:39

== Personnel ==
Credits adapted from the album's liner notes.

- El-P – executive producer
- Nasa – engineering, mixing (all tracks)
- Spence Boogie – assistant engineer (all tracks)
- Tippy – mastering engineer (all tracks)
- DJ Cip One – scratches (1–3, 6)
- DJ paWL – scratches (9)
- Jer – pots and pans (1)
- Cannibal Ox – additional vocals (Note: Credited as "additional trash talking and malarchy" with no track numbers specified.)
- S.A. Smash – additional vocals
- Party Fun Action Committee – additional vocals
- Murs – additional vocals
- Tomer Hanuka – illustrations
- Dan Ezra Lang – design and logos
- Ben Colen – photos
- Jesse Ferguson – product manager

== Charts ==
Chart (2003)	Peak position
US Billboard 200	112
US Independent Albums (Billboard)	7
US Heatseekers Albums (Billboard)	1
US Top R&B/Hip-Hop Albums (Billboard)	44
