= Lice (duo) =

American hip-hop duo

- Origin: United States
- Genres: Hip-hop
- Years active: 2015–present
- Label: Self-released
- Members: Aesop Rock; Homeboy Sandman

Lice is an American hip-hop duo consisting of rappers Aesop Rock and Homeboy Sandman. Formed in 2015, the pair have released a series of collaborative extended plays under the Lice name, frequently distributed as free digital downloads.

== Background ==
Aesop Rock and Homeboy Sandman began collaborating in 2015. Their first joint EP, Lice, was released that year as a free digital download.

== Reception ==
Reviewers noted the chemistry between the two rappers and their contrasting lyrical styles. Pitchfork described the collaboration as pairing Aesop Rock's dense and abstract lyricism with Homeboy Sandman's more conversational delivery. Coverage in Stereogum highlighted the duo's creative chemistry and collaborative dynamic. A 2016 Spin column later highlighted the collaboration as part of a roundup of notable but overlooked releases.

== Discography ==
=== Extended plays ===
Title	Year
Lice	2015
Lice Two: Still Buggin’	2016
Lice 3: Triple Fat Lice	2017
Miami Lice: Season Four	2026

=== Other collaborations ===
Outside of the EP series, Aesop Rock and Homeboy Sandman have occasionally collaborated on standalone tracks. In 2021 they released "Ask Anyone", a tribute to rapper MF Doom. In 2022 they released "Catfish".
