= Labor Days =

Studio album by Aesop Rock
- Released: September 18, 2001
- Genre: Alternative hip-hop
- Length: 61:03
- Label: Definitive Jux
- Producers: Aesop Rock; Blockhead; Omega One

Aesop Rock chronology
Float (2000)	Labor Days (2001)	Daylight (2002)

Singles from Labor Days
- 1. "Coma" Released: 2001; 2. "Boombox" Released: 2001

Labor Days is the third studio album by American hip-hop artist Aesop Rock. It was released by Definitive Jux on September 18, 2001. It is a concept album about work. The album's production was handled by Aesop Rock, Blockhead, and Omega One.

The song "Labor" was featured on the soundtrack of the video game Tony Hawk's Pro Skater 4.

Upon release, Labor Days was met with widespread critical acclaim from music critics, and was praised for its wordplay and phrasing.

== Composition ==
According to Aesop Rock, after releasing Float in 2000, he was still working a day job while writing and recording music. During this period, he drew increasing attention from El-P, head of Def Jux, in part because of his popularity and presence in the early days of the internet. Aesop Rock played "Boombox" for El-P and was signed to the label.

Aesop Rock and Blockhead recorded the album using the same Roland VS-880 he had used for his previous releases, Float and Appleseed. At the time of recording, Aesop Rock lived on Avenue A and 11th Street and Blockhead lived in the West Village. According to Blockhead, the songs were two-tracked and, therefore, no instrumental versions of most songs on the album survive. A version of "Bent Life" was recorded featuring Slug and Eyedea but the song was eventually scrapped because the rappers were dissatisfied with their verses. That version of the song, which Blockhead wrote in September 2011 was thought to be lost, was preserved by Despot and posted online as "Thorns" in November 2011. Blockhead wrote that Aesop Rock learned from Float, on which he released all 20 songs he had written, that Labor Days should be "more concise." Tracks which did not make the album included "Water" which, per Blockhead "just didn't fit with the rest of the album," and "Jinx Planet." "Water" would later be released on the compilation album Euphony by Centrifugal Phorce Records. Aesop Rock played the bass guitar on "Flashflood" after he and Blockhead agreed the track "was definitely missing something."

The album was mixed at Cryptic One's home in Long Island. Omega One, who also produced the album's only track not produced by Aesop Rock or Blockhead, designed the album cover.

== Release and tour ==
In late August or early September 2001, Def Jux personnel told Aesop Rock to leave his day job so that he could tour and promote the album. He quit his job at an art gallery in Manhattan about a week before he was set to join the Kill the Robots tour, which featured performers from Def Jux and Rhymesayers Entertainment. However, an anxiety attack caused him to miss the beginning of the tour. Instead, he stayed home and found himself in lower Manhattan during the September 11 attacks. Within days, Aesop Rock had joined the tour in Champaign, Illinois. Labor Days was released just a week after the September 11 attacks on September 18, 2001.

== Critical reception ==
Professional ratings
Aggregate scores
Source	Rating
Metacritic	92/100
Review scores
Source	Rating
AllMusic	4.5/5 stars
Entertainment Weekly	A
HipHopDX	4.0/5
Muzik	4/5
Pitchfork	8.7/10
The Rolling Stone Album Guide	4/5 stars
Stylus Magazine	A−
Uncut	4/5 stars
The Village Voice	A−

At Metacritic, which assigns a weighted average score out of 100 to reviews from mainstream critics, Labor Days received an average score of 92 based on 5 reviews, indicating "universal acclaim".

In 2010, Rhapsody included it on its "10 Best Albums by White Rappers" list. In 2015, Fact placed it at number 17 on its "100 Best Indie Hip-Hop Records of All Time" list. A writer for the magazine said: "Glancing at Labor Days 14 years later, all the pop culture references and clever turns of phrase and wordplay tricks are finally understood and pleasant to listen to. We can't wait until 2030 when Skelethon will be just as easy to grasp." In 2025, Pitchfork ranked it at number 58 on their "100 Best Rap Albums of All Time" list. The website's writer Matthew Strauss called it "an album so creative and distinctive, even among the underground favorite's vast catalog, that, once you fall in love with it, it's nearly impossible to enjoy anything else; nothing can compare."

== Track listing ==
No.	Title	Producer(s)	Length
1.	"Labor"	Aesop Rock	2:32
2.	"Daylight"	Blockhead	4:26
3.	"Save Yourself"	Blockhead	4:59
4.	"Flashflood"	Blockhead	3:54
5.	"No Regrets"	Blockhead	4:31
6.	"One Brick" (with Illogic)	Aesop Rock	4:32
7.	"The Tugboat Complex Pt. 3"	Blockhead	3:46
8.	"Coma"	Omega One	3:56
9.	"Battery"	Aesop Rock	5:07
10.	"Boombox"	Aesop Rock	5:05
11.	"Bent Life" (with C-Rayz Walz)	Blockhead	4:49
12.	"The Yes and the Y'all"	Blockhead	4:04
13.	"9-5ers Anthem"	Blockhead	4:38
14.	"Shovel"	Blockhead	4:45

== Personnel ==
Credits adapted from liner notes.

- Aesop Rock – vocals, production (1, 6, 9, 10), recording
- Illogic – vocals (6)
- C-Rayz Walz – vocals (11)
- Blockhead – production (2, 3, 4, 5, 7, 11, 12, 13, 14)
- Omega One – production (8), turntables
- Cryptic One – mixing
- Emily Lazar – mastering
- Dan Ezra Lang – art direction, design
- Owen Brozman – illustration
- Ben Colen – photography
