= Daylight (EP) =

EP by Aesop Rock
- Released: February 5, 2002
- Genre: Hip-hop
- Length: 52:26
- Label: Definitive Jux
- Producer: Blockhead; El-P; Blueprint; Aesop Rock

Aesop Rock chronology
Labor Days (2001)	Daylight (2002)	Bazooka Tooth (2003)

Daylight is an EP by American hip-hop artist Aesop Rock. It was released via Definitive Jux on February 5, 2002. It is also the title of a single from his 2001 album, Labor Days. The song is included on the EP, along with a reworking entitled "Night Light".

== Critical reception ==
Professional ratings
Review scores
Source	Rating
AllMusic	2.5/5 stars
HipHopDX	4.5/5
Muzik	5/5
The Rolling Stone Album Guide	4/5 stars
Stylus Magazine	A−
The Village Voice	A−

In 2015, Daylight was ranked at number 68 on Fact's "100 Best Indie Hip-Hop Records of All Time" list.

== Track listing ==
No.	Title	Producer(s)	Length
1.	"Daylight"	Blockhead	4:25
2.	"Night Light"	Blockhead	4:17
3.	"Nickel Plated Pockets" (featuring Vast Aire)	El-P	4:31
4.	"Alchemy" (featuring Blueprint)	Blueprint	4:24
5.	"Forest Crunk"	Blockhead	4:39
6.	"Bracket Basher"	Aesop Rock	5:38
7.	"Maintenance" (The song "Maintenance" ends at 4:33. After 14 minutes and 50 seconds of silence (4:33 – 19:23) begins the hidden song "One of Four".)	Blockhead; Aesop Rock	24:33

== Charts ==
Chart (2002)	Peak position
US Independent Albums (Billboard)	15
