= Float (Aesop Rock album) =

Studio album by Aesop Rock
- Released: September 5, 2000
- Genre: Hip-hop
- Length: 69:20
- Label: Mush
- Producers: Aesop Rock; Blockhead; Omega One

Aesop Rock chronology
Appleseed (1999)	Float (2000)	Labor Days (2001)

Float is the second studio album by American hip-hop artist Aesop Rock. It was released on Mush Records on September 5, 2000. Produced by Aesop Rock, Blockhead, and Omega One, it features guest appearances from Slug, Vast Aire, and Doseone.

== Background ==
Prior to Float, Aesop Rock self-released two projects, including the 1999 EP Appleseed. The final track of Appleseed featured Doseone, who—during the same period—had become an A&R representative for Mush Records. Doseone subsequently approached Aesop to offer him a single-album contract. Although he was skeptical of record labels at the time, Aesop decided to sign with Mush for Float due to the relatively small commitment and the simplicity of the contract; in a 2007 interview, he described his thought process at the time as "Fuck it, if I don't do this now..." Aesop had written "about 20" songs at the time and states that he decided to record all of them for Float.

== Critical reception ==
Professional ratings
Review scores
Source	Rating
AllMusic	4/5 stars
CMJ New Music Monthly	favorable
Exclaim!	mixed
Pitchfork	8.5/10
RapReviews	9/10
The New Rolling Stone Album Guide	3/5 stars
Spin	7/10

Brad Mills of AllMusic called the album "surprising, analytical, darkness, mystery, lyricism, and jealous." Jon Caramanica of Spin gave the album a 7 out of 10, commenting that "Aesop's voice is a rich, flat bass cut with a thin growl; through its resonance, he's able to explore the variations within a timbre to access a vast emotional range." Thomas Quinlan of Exclaim! gave the album a mixed review, writing: "While there are no bad songs, the consistent similarity between all of the tracks in regards to drum samples and vocal sounds causes the album to have a bit of a tiresome feel as it nears its conclusion." He added: "The guest MCs add different vocal styles to the album, which helps take your mind off Aesop's vocals long enough to appreciate them when they come back."

In 2014, Joseph Schafer of Stereogum named it the 3rd best Aesop Rock record, saying: "The whole record sounds more anxious than his more assured later work, which makes for an exciting listen."

Reviewing Float retrospectively in 2025, Dash Lewis of Pitchfork described it as "the road map for everything [Aesop Rock would] go on to do", highlighting the "overwhelming" feel of the densely packed lyrics, the paranoid mood of the album, and the incorporation of stylistic techniques like internal rhyme and "hyper-detailed observations".

== Track listing ==
No.	Title	Producer(s)	Length
1.	"Float"	Aesop Rock	1:54
2.	"Commencement at the Obedience Academy"	Blockhead	3:45
3.	"Big Bang"	Aesop Rock	5:00
4.	"Garbage"	Aesop Rock	4:01
5.	"I'll Be OK" (featuring Slug)	Blockhead	3:00
6.	"Breakfast with Blockhead"	Blockhead	0:36
7.	"Basic Cable"	Blockhead	4:11
8.	"Fascination"	Aesop Rock	3:46
9.	"Oxygen"	Blockhead	5:17
10.	"Skip Town"	Omega One	4:22
11.	"6B Panorama"	Aesop Rock	2:02
12.	"Lunch with Blockhead"	Blockhead	0:21
13.	"Spare a Match"	Blockhead	4:51
14.	"Attention Span" (featuring Vast Aire)	Blockhead	3:51
15.	"How to Be a Carpenter"	Aesop Rock	4:43
16.	"Prosperity"	Aesop Rock	3:56
17.	"No Splash"	Blockhead	4:02
18.	"Drawbridge" (featuring Doseone)	Blockhead	4:45
19.	"Dinner with Blockhead"	Blockhead	0:47
20.	"The Mayor and the Crook"	Aesop Rock	4:10
Total length:			69:20

== Personnel ==
Credits adapted from liner notes.

- Aesop Rock – vocals, production (1, 3, 4, 8, 11, 15, 16, 20)
- Blockhead – production (2, 5–7, 9, 12–14, 17–19)
- Omega One – production (10)
- Slug – vocals (5)
- Vast Aire – vocals (14)
- Doseone – vocals (18)
