= Skelethon =

Studio album by Aesop Rock
- Released: July 10, 2012
- Genre: Hip-hop
- Length: 55:10
- Label: Rhymesayers
- Producer: Aesop Rock

Aesop Rock chronology
None Shall Pass (2007)	Skelethon (2012)	The Impossible Kid (2016)

Singles from Skelethon
- 1. "Zero Dark Thirty" Released: 2012; 2. "ZZZ Top" Released: 2012

Skelethon is the sixth studio album by American rapper and record producer Aesop Rock. It was released on July 10, 2012, through Rhymesayers Entertainment, marking his first solo full-length for the label. Entirely self-produced, it features contributions from DJ Big Wiz, Rob Sonic, Allyson Baker, Hanni El Khatib, Kimya Dawson, Nicky Fleming-Yaryan, Grimace Federation, and Blueprint.

Music videos were created for "Zero Dark Thirty", "ZZZ Top", and "Cycles to Gehenna". A music video for "ZZZ Top" features the martial arts master Patti Li.

In the United States, the album debuted at number 21 on the Billboard 200 with 14,000 copies sold in its first week.

== Background ==
Aesop Rock announced in January 2012 that he had finished recording his new album Skelethon and that it would be released that year.

He has described death as a recurring motif on the album, stating:

It felt like everything around me was dying: people, relationships, all plant life in my apartment, you name it—it's dead. That's where the Skelethon title came from, and imagery associated with shit dying is prevalent. That said, I don't think there are many "sad" songs. It's more just like "ahhh I'm exploding"—I want it to sound urgent.

== Critical reception ==
Professional ratings
Aggregate scores
Source	Rating
AnyDecentMusic?	7.5/10
Metacritic	79/100
Review scores
Source	Rating
AllMusic	4/5 stars
Consequence of Sound	B
Drowned in Sound	9/10
HipHopDX	3.5/5
Los Angeles Times	3/4 stars
NME	3/5 stars
Pitchfork	8.2/10
PopMatters	7/10
Spin	7/10
Tiny Mix Tapes	4/5 marks

Skelethon was met with generally favourable reviews from music critics. At Metacritic, which assigns a normalized rating out of 100 to reviews from mainstream publications, the album received an average score of 79, based on twenty-seven reviews. The aggregator AnyDecentMusic? has the critical consensus of the album at a 7.5 out of 10, based on fifteen reviews.

=== Accolades ===
Accolades for Skelethon
Publication	Accolade	Rank	Ref.
Cokemachineglow	Top 50 Albums 2012	44	
HipHopDX	HipHopDX's Top 25 Albums Of 2012	—N/a	

== Track listing ==
All tracks are written by Ian Bavitz, except for track 7 is written with Kimya Dawson.

No.	Title	Length
1.	"Leisureforce"	4:43
2.	"ZZZ Top"	4:15
3.	"Cycles to Gehenna"	4:00
4.	"Zero Dark Thirty"	3:21
5.	"Fryerstarter"	3:28
6.	"Ruby '81"	2:33
7.	"Crows 1"	4:19
8.	"Crows 2"	2:30
9.	"Racing Stripes"	3:23
10.	"1,000 O'Clock"	3:58
11.	"Homemademummy"	2:46
12.	"Grace"	3:38
13.	"Saturn Missiles"	3:37
14.	"Tetra"	4:41
15.	"Gopher Guts"	3:58
Total length:		55:10

Deluxe Edition bonus tracks
No.	Title	Length
16.	"Dokken Rules" (featuring Rob Sonic)	3:59
17.	"BMX" (featuring Blueprint and Rob Sonic)	3:34

10 Year Anniversary Edition bonus tracks
No.	Title	Length
18.	"Zero Dark Thirty" (Blockhead Remix)
19.	"Cycles to Gehenna" (Zavala Remix)

== Personnel ==
- Ian "Aesop Rock" Bavitz – lyrics, vocals, producer, executive producer
- Allyson Baker – additional vocals (tracks: 1, 2), guitar (tracks: 2, 11, 14), bass (tracks: 7, 9)
- Hanni El Khatib – additional vocals (tracks: 1, 12), guitar (tracks: 7, 12, 14)
- Robert "Rob Sonic" Smith – additional vocals (tracks: 4, 8, 11)
- Kimya Dawson – lyrics (track 7), additional vocals (traacks: 7, 9)
- Nicolas Fleming-Yaryan – drums (tracks: 7, 12, 14)
- Grimace Federation – additional instrumentation (tracks: 1, 7)
- DJ Big Wiz – scratches
- Joey Raia – mixing
- Michael Nazzario – engineering assistant
- John Greenham – mastering
- Brent Sayers – executive producer
- Sean "Slug" Daley – executive producer
- Aryz – artwork, layout
- Jason Cook – coordinator
- Skye Rossi – coordinator
- Lisa Klipsic – management

== Charts ==
Chart (2012)	Peak position
US Billboard 200	21
US Top R&B/Hip-Hop Albums (Billboard)	5
US Top Rap Albums (Billboard)	2
US Independent Albums (Billboard)	1
US Vinyl Albums (Billboard)	5
