= Dirty Ghosts =

American rock band

Dirty Ghosts are a San Francisco rock band formed in 2006 by Allyson Baker, Carson Binks and Baker's then-husband Ian Bavitz, known professionally as Aesop Rock. After the departure of Binks and Bavitz, Baker remained as the driving force in the band.

== History ==
The band formed after the dissolution of Baker and Binks' prior band Parchman Farm, with Baker's then-husband Bavitz providing beats via drum machine. The first song "Battle Slang" released in 2009 was described by Pitchfork as "riff-tastic with stuttering snares and a gritty bass pulse." The demos and singles they recorded eventually became the Metal Moon album, released in 2012 on Last Gang Records. Baker explained what influenced the sound of Metal Moon to CMJ "The idea of music based on the beat, with the guitar and bass working around each other yet together in a really minimal and non-linear way. The first album had more of that type of influence, and definitely my surroundings played a role in that—living with a rapper who was producing his own music in the next room."

In 2015, Last Gang also released their follow-up LP Let It Pretend, with musical influences from post-punk and bands like Duran Duran, Devo and The Stranglers.[7] After Binks' and Bavitz' departure, the Dirty Ghosts live band was composed of Erin Mcdermott on bass, and Tony Sevener (Honeycut, Summercamp) on drums - occasionally taking Sevener's place have been Paul Quattrone (Osees, !!!) and Andrew Moszynski (The Deadly Snakes).

== Videos ==
The videos for "Cataract", "Ropes That Way" and "Katana Rock" were directed by Derrick Beckles. The "Cataract" video premiered on Adult Swim in October 2015.

== Other projects ==
Baker is a member of the Red Room Orchestra a collective of composers and performers who've played and recorded alongside the Bad Seeds, the Plastic Ono Band, Cibo Matto, Oingo Boingo, Bill Frisell and Lou Harrison. Baker's past affiliations include playing guitar in Toronto bands Armed & Hammered, The Shuttlecocks, Teen Crud Combo and Parchman Farm, the latter of which she formed after moving to San Francisco in the early 2000s.[13] She's played guitar on releases by Aesop Rock, !!!, Kimya Dawson, The Dwarves, Cage, El-P, Felt (Slug & Murs) and Kelley Stoltz.

== Discography ==
2011 Shout It In – 7", Classic Bar Music

2012 Metal Moon – LP, Last Gang Records

2012 Katana Rock/Eyes of a Stranger 7" – Last Gang Records

2013 Third Man Records Desert Gold 7" Box Set Live single – Third Man Records

2015 Cataract – cassette EP, Burger Records

2015 Let It Pretend – LP, Last Gang Records

2016 Witch Hunt – 7", Rubber Tracks

2020 Strange Weather – 7", Nomad Eel

== Remixes ==
"Shout It In"- Aesop Rock

"Ropes That Way"- Mikey Young, Total Control

"Cataract" - Tobacco
