= Aesop Rock =

American rapper (born 1976)

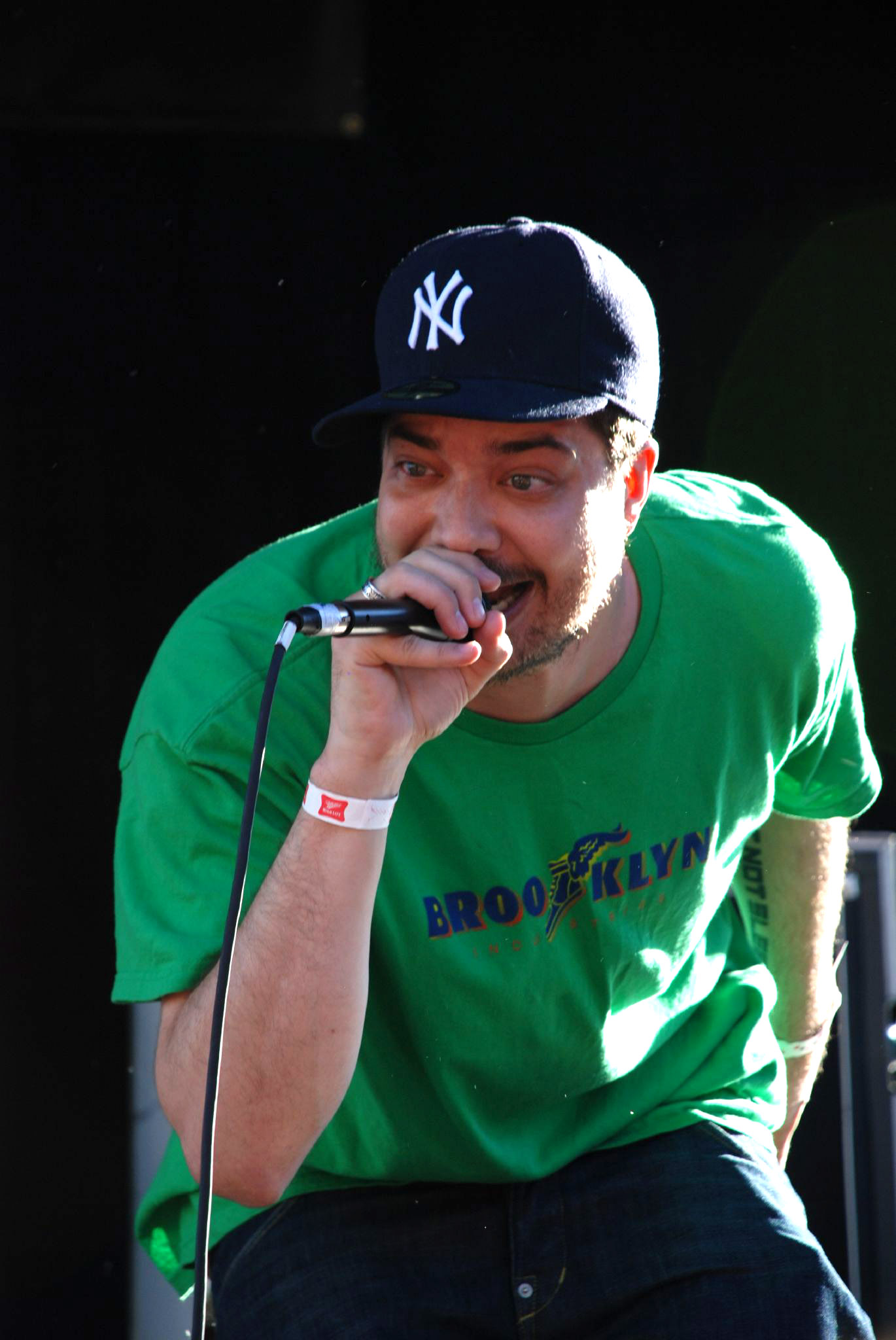
- Aesop Rock performing in 2007

Background information
- Born: Ian Matthias Bavitz; June 5, 1976 (age 50); Syosset, New York, U.S.
- Origin: Northport, New York, U.S.
- Genres: East Coast hip-hop; alternative hip-hop; underground hip-hop
- Occupations: Rapper; songwriter; record producer
- Works: Aesop Rock discography
- Years active: 1996–present
- Labels: Definitive Jux; Mush; Rhymesayers; Stones Throw
- Member of: Malibu Ken; Lice
- Formerly of: The Weathermen; The Uncluded; Hail Mary Mallon

Ian Matthias Bavitz (born June 5, 1976), better known by his stage name Aesop Rock, is an American rapper and producer. He was at the forefront of the new wave of underground and alternative hip-hop acts that emerged during the late 1990s and early 2000s. He was signed to El-P's Definitive Jux label until it went on hiatus in 2010. In a 2010 retrospective, betterPropaganda ranked him at number 19 at the Top 100 Artists of the Decade.

He released his first album, Music for Earthworms, in 1997, with Float following three years later on Mush Records. Labor Days, his third studio album and first on Definitive Jux, was released in September 2001. He remained on Definitive Jux for his next two albums, Bazooka Tooth (2003) and None Shall Pass (2007). After Definitive Jux's hiatus, Bavitz moved to Rhymesayers for his next album, Skelethon, in 2012. He has remained in Rhymesayers for his subsequent studio albums, including The Impossible Kid (2016), Spirit World Field Guide, (2020), Garbology (2021), Integrated Tech Solutions (2023), Black Hole Superette and I Heard It's a Mess There Too (both 2025).

He was a member of the groups The Weathermen, Hail Mary Mallon, and the Uncluded, and is currently the vocalist of duo Malibu Ken.

Regarding his name, he said: "I acquired the name Aesop from a movie I had acted in with some friends. It was my character's name and it sort of stuck. The rock part came later just from throwing it in rhymes."

== Early life and education ==
Bavitz was born at Syosset Hospital in Syosset, New York, and raised in Northport, Long Island, New York, to his father Paul and mother Jameija. Bavitz has two brothers: Christopher T. Bavitz (born 1973), a clinical professor at Harvard Law School and director of Cyberlaw Clinic at the Berkman Klein Center for Internet & Society, and Graham J. Bavitz (born 1978). Along with his siblings, Ian was raised Catholic, but he later became agnostic. Bavitz attended Northport High School in 1990 and graduated in 1994.

After graduating from high school, Bavitz attended Boston University in Massachusetts where he studied visual arts. He acquired his bachelor's in 1998. He met his future collaborator, Blockhead, in 1994 during the latter's only year at the school. After hearing Aesop Rock freestyle, Blockhead decided to forgo his own dreams of rapping in favor of focusing on production. Blockhead was involved with a crew in New York called The Overground that included Dub-L. During his early adulthood, Aesop Rock held various odd jobs including positions answering phones for clothing catalogs, packaging artwork in art gallery storerooms and working for one-hour photo developers.

== Career ==
=== 1985–2001: New York City underground music scene ===
As a youth, Bavitz and his family would usually commute to New York City. This had a great impact on him and the way he viewed the hip-hop culture. Bavitz began rapping in the early 1990s. He cites Public Enemy, BDP, KMD, and Run DMC as early influences. Bavitz also listened to rock acts such as Dead Kennedys, Fugazi, and Ministry; he was introduced to these groups by his older brother Chris. Bavitz started to play the piano and bass at an early age and eventually acquired a sampler.

While attending college, Bavitz initially recorded and released two self-financed efforts. The first was Music for Earthworms (1997), a full-length album featuring underground artist Percee P on two tracks. Bavitz also released a music video for "Abandon All Hope", which was one of the tracks on the CD. The album sold over 300 copies, largely from a grassroots internet-based promotion at his website AesopRock.com and then-popular web portal, MP3.com. Music for Earthworms was mostly produced by his long-time friend Blockhead and underground producer Dub-L.

Aesop followed Music for Earthworms with the 1999 EP Appleseed, which featured a guest appearance by the rapper Doseone. At the time, Doseone was working in A&R at Mush Records, and after the release of Appleseed he arranged a one-album Mush contract for Aesop. This contract resulted in Aesop's first major album, Float (2000), with guest appearances from Vast Aire, Slug, and Dose One. Production was split between Blockhead and Aesop himself, with one track by Omega One. During this time, Aesop worked at a photography gallery. In August 2001, Bavitz had a nervous breakdown. The song "One of Four" on his Daylight EP documents his struggles.

=== 2001–2004: Labor Days, Daylight EP, and Bazooka Tooth ===
While signed to Mush, Aesop Rock became acquainted with El-P, who at the time was in the process of establishing the Manhattan-based label Definitive Jux (also known as Def Jux). Aesop signed to Def Jux shortly after the release of Float. Aesop's first Def Jux project was the 2001 album Labor Days, an album dedicated to the discussion of labor in American society and the concept of "wage slaves". The success of Labor Days enabled Aesop to pursue music as a full-time career. The album became Aesop's first project to reach the Billboard charts, peaking at number 15 at the United States Independent Charts; its opening track, "Labor", was also featured in Tony Hawk's Pro Skater 4.

Due to the popularity of "Daylight", a track from Labor Days, Aesop expanded the song into a seven-track EP in 2002, including an "alternative" new version titled "Night Light", whose paraphrased lyrics simultaneously refer back to, and stand in stark opposition to, the original's.

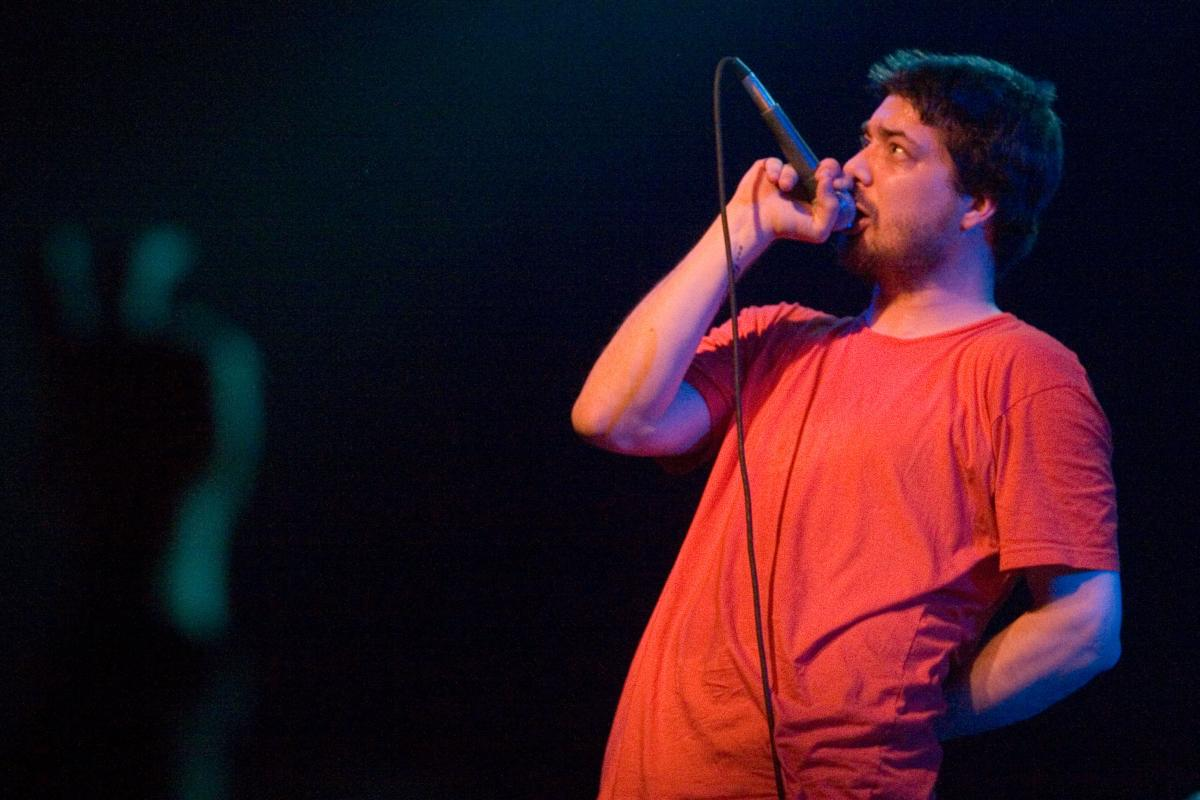
Aesop Rock performing in 2006

Labor Days was followed by Bazooka Tooth in 2003. For the first time, production was mostly handled by Bavitz himself, with three tracks from longtime collaborator Blockhead and one from close friend and Definitive Jux label CEO El-P. Guest appearances include Party Fun Action Committee, El-P, and Mr. Lif (all Definitive Jux labelmates) and Camp Lo. Reflecting on Bazooka Tooth in 2007, Aesop described his goal with the album was to have it sound "turbulent" and "abrasive", a direction inspired by his uncertainty about how to respond to his growing fanbase. With this release Aesop hit a higher level of recognition, releasing "No Jumper Cables" as a single and music video, then another single, "Freeze", shortly after. A remix of "No Jumper Cables" was featured on Tony Hawk's Underground 2, furthering Aesop's recognition. In 2004, he released Build Your Own Bazooka Tooth and created a contest in which contestants had to create a remix of an Aesop Rock song using the a cappellas and instrumentals.

=== 2005–2007: Fast Cars EP, None Shall Pass and Nike+iPod ===
In February 2005, Aesop Rock released a new EP, Fast Cars, Danger, Fire and Knives. The first pressing of the EP included an 88-page booklet with lyrics from every release from Float until this EP (the lyric booklet is titled The Living Human Curiosity Sideshow); later pressings of the album come without the booklet, but with an additional bonus track, "Facemelter". In addition, a limited number of albums were available direct from Def Jux with Aesop Rock's graffiti tag on them. In response to demands from his fans, Bavitz did less production on the EP; three songs are produced by Blockhead, three produced by Aesop, and one by Rob Sonic. During this time, he was asked to join The Weathermen to replace Vast Aire.

Aesop Rock was commissioned to create a 45-minute instrumental track for the Nike+iPod running system, entitled All Day. It was released in February 2007. Distributed via the iTunes Music Store and featuring Allyson Baker on guitar and with scratches from DJ Big Wiz, Aesop has described the release as "something that evolved enough that the sound was constantly fresh and attractive, as though the runner were moving through a set of differing cities or landscapes."

All Day was followed in August of the same year by Bavitz's fifth full-length album, None Shall Pass, released in 2007. The album contained original art by Jeremy Fish, whose work Rock set to a slideshow backed by a track titled "Tomorrow Morning". It was exhibited in San Francisco and was available for download online. None Shall Pass had positive reviews from critics and fans, applauding Aesop for his change in sound.

=== 2008–2014: Skelethon and collaborations ===
After None Shall Pass, Aesop Rock did not release any solo projects for several years. During this period, Definitive Jux began its indefinite hiatus; thus, Aesop Rock's next album, Skelethon, was instead released through Rhymesayers Entertainment. The album was released on July 10, 2012, and preceded by the single "Zero Dark Thirty". After Skelethon's release, Aesop Rock toured the United States to promote the album. He also performed on the first day of Coachella 2013.

During Bavitz's hiatus from solo recording, he continued to collaborate with other musicians. In 2009, he produced Felt's third album, Felt 3: A Tribute to Rosie Perez. He later joined frequent collaborators Rob Sonic and DJ Big Wiz to form the group Hail Mary Mallon, through which he released two albums: 2011's Are You Gonna Eat That? and 2014's Bestiary. Aesop Rock's collaborations during this period also include the establishment of the Uncluded, a group he formed alongside anti-folk singer Kimya Dawson of the Moldy Peaches. The Uncluded released their debut album, Hokey Fright, on May 7, 2013, and subsequently supported it with a tour that included Rhymesayers' 2013 Summerfest.

=== 2016–present: Further albums ===
In February 2016, Aesop Rock released a music video for the song "Rings" and announced his seventh studio album The Impossible Kid, which was released on April 29, 2016. "Rings" was featured in the video game Madden NFL 17.

In 2017, Aesop Rock scored his first film soundtrack for Bushwick. In January 2019, Aesop Rock collaborated with electronic musician Tobacco under the name Malibu Ken. The duo released a self-titled album in the same month. In late 2020, Aesop announced his eighth solo album, titled Spirit World Field Guide, along with the release of the album's first single, "The Gates". In October 2021, Aesop announced a reunion with his former producer Blockhead with the album titled Garbology. The album was released on November 12 of the same year.

On December 9, 2022, Aesop Rock released the song "Pumpkin Seeds" featuring the Chicago rapper Lupe Fiasco and produced by Blockhead. The song is a fundraiser for the Collaboratory, an organization promoting two local DIY skateparks in Dayton, Ohio.

On September 14, 2023, Aesop Rock announced the release date of his ninth solo studio album Integrated Tech Solutions, which was released on November 10, 2023. That same day, he released the single "Mindful Solutionism" along with an accompanying music video. In October 2023, he released two singles that appear on Integrated Tech Solutions; "By the River" on October 5 and "Infinity Fill Goose Down" on October 26. His tenth studio album, Black Hole Superette, was announced in April 2025 and released on May 30, 2025, with the song "Checkers" being released that April as its first single.

In October 2025, the album I Heard It's a Mess There Too was released as a free download via Aesop Rock's official website, and as a single unlisted video on the official Aesop Rock YouTube channel.

In September 2026, a second collaborative album with Blockhead named Trouble Mountain was announced, along with the release of its first single "Trouble Trouble"; the album was released on November 13.

Aesop Rock has frequently collaborated with fellow underground rapper Homeboy Sandman as the duo Lice. Together they released a series of free collaborative EPs, Lice (2015), Lice Two: Still Buggin' (2016), Triple Fat Lice (2017), and Miami Lice: Season Four (2026), which became cult favorites in the indie hip-hop scene. These projects were well received by critics, who highlighted the pair’s complementary chemistry and the “hyper-referential density” of their lyricism.

== Lyrics ==
"None Shall Pass"
"None Shall Pass" demonstrates Aesop Rock's verbosity and cryptic themes; his ability to combine complex, internal rhymes built on inventive phrasings and metaphors. His lyrics harbor oblique couplets that vaguely discuss society paying the price for its sins.

Critics state that Bavitz's use of words can be so detailed that it becomes difficult to determine any meaning. The lyrics are sometimes inspired by events which have occurred in Bavitz's personal life and are thus naturally prone to subjective interpretation by outsiders.

Questioned about his lyrical style in an interview, Bavitz responded:

It's probably because it's not the most accessible music in the world. It may pose a slight challenge to the listener beyond your average pop song. I'm no genius by a long shot, but these songs are not nonsensical, that's pretty preposterous. I'd have to be a genius to pull this many nonsensical records over people's eyes. It's not exactly fast food but when people pretend I'm just spewing non-sequiturs and gibberish I can't help but think they simply haven't listened and are regurgitating some rumor they've heard about me. Even if it's not laid out in perfect sentences—is any rap?—you'd have to be an idiot to not at least grasp a few things from these songs. Or have had no interest in pulling anything from them in the first place.

In 2002, on the song "One of Four" (a hidden track on the Daylight EP) Aesop Rock explains:

But I can tell you that I only write shit down when I believe it / so take this how you want but know I mean it.
— "One of Four" Daylight EP (2002)

In May 2014, a study by Matt Daniels found that Aesop Rock's vocabulary in his music surpassed 85 other major hip-hop and rap artists, as well as Shakespeare's works and Herman Melville's Moby Dick; he was cited as having the largest vocabulary in hip-hop. To build up his vocabulary, he reads a lot of news and science articles and writes down all the words he finds interesting. Analysis of his lyrics identified him as the rapper with the most expansive vocabulary; using the most unique words in a rapper's first 35,000 lyrics, he had 7,839 unique words.

== Personal life ==
In 2005, he married Allyson Baker, guitarist and vocalist of rock band Dirty Ghosts; they resided in San Francisco, but have since divorced.

== Discography ==
- Music for Earthworms (1998)
- Float (2000)
- Labor Days (2001)
- Bazooka Tooth (2003)
- None Shall Pass (2007)
- Skelethon (2012)
- The Impossible Kid (2016)
- Spirit World Field Guide (2020)
- Garbology (2021) (with Blockhead)
- Integrated Tech Solutions (2023)
- Black Hole Superette (2025)
- I Heard It's a Mess There Too (2025)
- Trouble Mountain (2026) (with Blockhead)

== Filmography ==
Year	Film	Role	Notes
2003	Sad Clown Bad Dub IV	Himself – Credited as "Ian Bavitz"	Video documentary with Atmosphere
2005	Letter to the President	Himself – Recording Artist	Video documentary
2005	The Warriors	Rouges	Video game; voice acting role
2006	Hip Hop Street Credentials	Himself	Video documentary
2007	My Shot With...	Himself	Appears in "Bonnaroo" episode.
2008	Engine Room	Judge	Miscellaneous Crew
2010	Blacking Up: Hip-Hop's Remix of Race and Identity	Himself	Television documentary
2010	Independent Lens	Himself	Episode 1111: "Copyright Criminals"
