= Homeboy Sandman =

American rapper (born 1980)

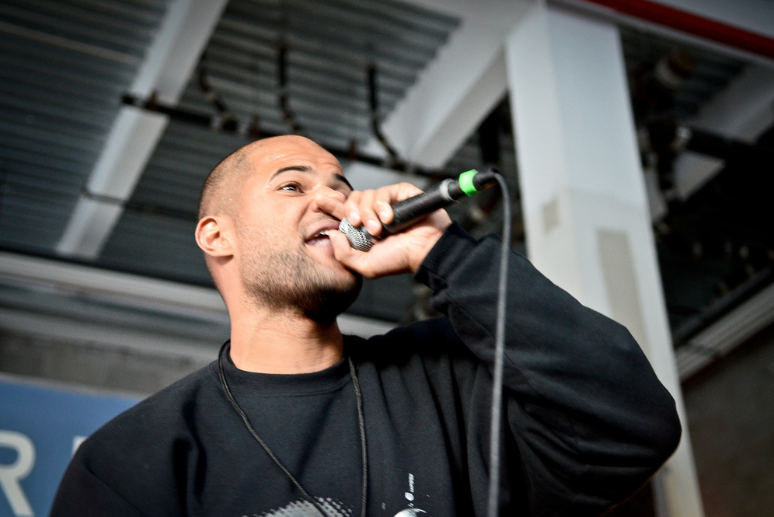
- Homeboy Sandman performing live in 2008

Background information
- Born: Angel Del Villar II; September 24, 1980 (age 46)
- Origin: Queens, New York, United States
- Genres: Hip-hop; alternative hip-hop
- Occupation: Rapper
- Years active: 2007–present
- Labels: Stones Throw Records; Mello Music Group
- Member of: Lice

Angel Del Villar II (born September 24, 1980), better known by his stage name Homeboy Sandman, is an American rapper from Elmhurst, Queens in New York.

== Career ==
Homeboy Sandman recorded and released his first EP, Nourishment, in March 2007. His debut album, entitled Nourishment (Second Helpings), was released in August 2007. In early 2008, Homeboy Sandman's work began to be featured on underground radio programs the Squeeze Radio Show on WKCR 89.9 FM and the Halftime Radio Program on WNYU 89.1 FM in Midtown Manhattan, New York. In June 2008, he was featured in The Source's "Unsigned Hype" column.

His second album, Actual Factual Pterodactyl was acclaimed upon its release in August 2008. The album was commended in XXXL's Chairman's Choice column, which said that Homeboy Sandman's "sharp lyrics and irresistibly melodic flow, which together form an elastic instrument few MCs can match." Actual Factual Pterodactyl received critical acclaim in many print and online publications including Blender magazine, Beyond Race magazine, Okayplayer.com and MSN.com. At the end of 2008, Homeboy Sandman was named "Best Hip Hop Act in NYC 2008" by New York Press. His music has received rotation on Power 105.1 FM and Hot 97.1 FM, the city's No. 1 hip-hop and R&B radio station in addition to airplay on Spitkicker Radio (Channel 65 on XM Satellite Radio), DJ Premier's "Live From HeadQCourterz" (Sirius Satellite Radio's No. 1 ranked Hip Hop show) and BBC 1Xtra's Hip Hop M1X (Hosted by DJ Sarah Love).

In addition to his studio releases, Homeboy Sandman has received attention for his live performances. From January 2008 to August 2009 he was the host of “All That! Hip Hop, Poetry and Jazz” at the Nuyorican Poets Café in Manhattan, New York City's longest-running open mic session (originally hosted by hip-hop icon Bobbito García). Homeboy Sandman has performed at the biggest hip-hop shows around the country including the South by Southwest (SXSW) music festival in Austin, Texas, the Brooklyn Hip Hop Festival in Brooklyn, New York, the Rock the Bells hip-hop festival in Queens, the A3C Hip Hop Festival in Atlanta, and New York City's CMJ Music Marathon. He has recorded interviews with performers at his live shows, which are in his YouTube video series "Homeboy Sandman presents Live From..."

In addition to his own releases, Homeboy Sandman has appeared on records by other artists, frequently with members of the AOK Collective, with whom he is affiliated. He recently appeared on Fresh Daily's 2009 album The Gorgeous Killer: In Crimes of Passion and the 2008 album For Your Consideration released by P.SO (formerly P. Casso). Homeboy Sandman collaborated with Fresh Daily and P.SO for the song "Get On Down," which is featured on Sonic Smash, the album released in 2009 by music producer DJ Spinna. Homeboy Sandman has also laid down tracks for a series of features with RIDES magazine. The track that Homeboy Sandman created for the Loud.com challenge, "Gun Control," was cited as one of the Top 25 Songs of 2009 by Hot 97 DJ Peter Rosenberg.

On June 1, 2010, Homeboy Sandman released his third album, The Good Sun, which features production from 2 Hungry Bros, Ski Beatz, Thievin' Stephen, DJ Spinna, Psycho Les (The Beatnuts) and Core Rhythm, among others. The first single from The Good Sun was "Angels with Dirty Faces," produced by J57. In September 2010, Homeboy Sandman released his first official video for The Good Sun for the track, "The Essence". In late 2010, he was featured as the coach in an episode of MTV's Made, which premiered in October 2010. In August 2011, he signed with Stones Throw Records of Los Angeles and released his debut project, Subject: Matter EP on January 24, 2012. He released his second EP with Stones Throw Records, titled Chimera in April 2012 and on September 18, 2012, released his debut full-length LP with Stones Throw entitled First of a Living Breed. The album featured production from Oddisee, J57, 6th Sense, RTNC and long-time production partners 2 Hungry Bros., along with label mates Jonwayne and Oh No, amongst others. In 2014, Homeboy Sandman released the EP, White Sands, which was produced by Paul White. Nate Patrin of Pitchfork commented that the producer and rapper had "a mutually beneficial set of styles" in a positive review. In 2014, Homeboy Sandman released the album, Hallways.

In the wake of the Donald Sterling scandal, Homeboy Sandman wrote an op-ed for Gawker called "Black People are Cowards," which attracted more than 1.3 million views in the first seven days of its publication. In 2016, Homeboy Sandman released the album, Kindness for Weakness, which included Edan-produced "Talking (Bleep)". In 2019, he announced that he had signed a new deal with Mello Music Group and released the new single "West Coast" produced by Aesop Rock to celebrate the label signing. Homeboy Sandman's first album on Mello Music Group, “Dusty,” was released on October 18, 2019. Production was handled by Mono En Stereo. Dusty garnered positive reviews from music critics. Paul Simpson of AllMusic wrote that Mono En Stereo's soundscape of "laid-back, ambling jazz and funk grooves" complimented Sandman's "conversational, matter-of-fact rhymes" throughout the album. He said, "Dusty is another winning set of pointed observations from Sandman, who effortlessly unloads his thoughts without seeming like a burden on the listener."

Homeboy Sandman's 2020 album “Don’t Feed The Monster” was produced by Quelle Chris. “Don’t Feed The Monster” was listed in NPR's top 50 albums of 2020. Homeboy Sandman later received two awards for music videos which accompanied the album. He received a UK Music Video award for “Monument” (directed by Pavel Buryak) in 2021 and won for Best Foreign Documentary at the Rome Film Awards 2022 for Don’t Look Down Video (directed by Robert Mayer aka Photo Rob). At the beginning of 2021, Aesop Rock and Homeboy Sandman released their single “Ask Anyone,” which was featured on the FIFA 21 soundtrack. After it came out, Homeboy Sandman announced his EP Anjelitu, which was produced entirely by Aesop Rock. The EP was released in August 2021. Okayplayer highlighted Anjelitu as being one of the best hip-hop projects of 2021. Pete Rock later praised “Go Hard” from Anjelitu. At the end of 2021, Homeboy Sandman received unexpected attention after Doja Cat said that he is “one of my favorite rappers” on an Instagram live.

Homeboy Sandman's tenth studio album, There in Spirit, was released on February 25, 2022. In the same year, he released the mixtape I Can't Sell These for free on Bandcamp, due in part to an inability to clear various samples he used. Music critic Robert Christgau hailed it as "the finest album of one of hip-hop's most prolific careers", giving it an "A". Homeboy Sandman revitalized his acclaimed Anjelitu EP, by releasing the Anjelitu Deluxe with two new tracks as well as Aesop Rock's instrumentals from the project. Homeboy Sandman's eleventh studio album, “Still Champion” produced by Deca, came out on November 11, 2022, after the two went on a 19-stop co-headlining tour. “Still Champion” reached No. 24 on the iTunes hip-hop charts and Riff magazine included it in their top 20 Hip-Hop albums of 2022.

Homeboy Sandman collaborated with a nonprofit organization, Oakstop Alliance of Oakland, California, on the album “Royalty Summit,” released on December 23, 2022. Royalty Summit is the debut release from Oakstop Alliance’s Oakland Resident music initiative. Homeboy Sandman was planning the west coast run for his There In Spirit Tour when longtime friend and Oakstop Alliance executive director Damon Johnson pitched him the concept. The 12-track album was recorded over 3 days in Oakland as a residency collaboration between Homeboy Sandman, and over 20 Oakland musical artists. On Christmas Day in 2022, he announced the debut full-length release for his label Dirty Looks, titled “12 Days of Christmas & Dia De Los Reyes.” He rolled out a song from the project each day until the full album’s release on January 6, 2023.

In August 2023, Homeboy Sandman connected with beatmaker Mono En Stereo–whom he had collaborated with on past albums Kool Herc: Fertile Crescent and Dusty–for his studio album “Rich” released via Dirty Looks. The album was lauded by Pitchfork, Vibe magazine, HipHopDX, and more. Homeboy Sandman later released "I Can't Sell These Either" in November 2023, continuing the "I Can't Sell These" mixtape series he began in 2022. At the 2024 Summer Olympics in Paris, Homeboy Sandman's song "The Carpenter" was used during the women's breaking finals in the Japan vs. Netherlands battle. He released his studio album Rich II in 2024. Later in 2024, he released a mixtape Nor Can These Be Sold At Least By Me accompanied by a surprise EP Turns Out I Can Sell A Few Of These After All. He released Rich 2.5 in January 2025, a deluxe album which combined Rich and Rich II with four remixes. Next, he released three collaborative EPs Dancing Tree with Illingsworth, Corn Hole Legend with yeyts., and Manners with Brand the Builder.

Homeboy Sandman has frequently collaborated with fellow underground rapper Aesop Rock as the duo Lice. Together they released a series of free collaborative EPs, Lice (2015), Lice Two: Still Buggin' (2016), and Triple Fat Lice (2017), which became cult favorites in the indie hip-hop scene. These projects were well received by critics, who highlighted the pair’s complementary chemistry and the “hyper-referential density” of their lyricism. In 2022, Rhymesayers released all three of Homeboy Sandman and Aesop Rock's Lice albums on digital streaming platforms. After a long hiatus, the duo released Miami Lice: Season Four in 2026.

== Personal life ==
Del Villar's father and mother were born in the Dominican Republic and Puerto Rico respectively. His father boxed as a heavyweight before becoming an attorney. Homeboy Sandman graduated from the University of Pennsylvania in Philadelphia with a Bachelor of Arts degree and then accepted a scholarship to attend law school. He dropped out to focus on music. He rapped about his vegan diet in the song "Fat Belly" but, by the time he filmed the music video for the song, he had abandoned veganism. However, several years later in 2021, he released a song titled "No Beef" in which he again extolled veganism.

== Discography ==
=== Albums ===
- Nourishment (Second Helpings) (2007)
- Actual Factual Pterodactyl (2008)
- The Good Sun (2010)
- First of a Living Breed (2012)
- Hallways (2014)
- Kindness for Weakness (2016)
- Veins (2017)
- Dusty (2019) with Mono en Stereo
- Don't Feed the Monster (2020) with Quelle Chris
- Anjelitu Deluxe (2022) with Aesop Rock
- Still Champion (2022)
- 12 Days of Christmas & Dia de Los Reyes (2023)
- Rich (2023)
- Rich II (2024)
- Rich 2.5 (2025)
- Resonance Frequency (2026) with Jack Splash

=== EPs ===
- Nourishment (2007)
- Subject: Matter (2012)
- Chimera EP (2012)
- Kool Herc: Fertile Crescent (2013) with El RTNC
- All That I Hold Dear (2013) with M Slago
- White Sands (2014) with Paul White
- Homeboy Sandman Is the Sandman (2014) with Blu
- Lice (2015) with Aesop Rock
- Lice Two: Still Buggin' (2016) with Aesop Rock
- Lice Three: Triple Fat Lice (2017) with Aesop Rock
- Humble Pi (2018) with Edan
- Anjelitu (2021) with Aesop Rock
- There in Spirit (2022)
- Turns Out I Can Sell a Few of These After All (2024)
- Dancing Tree (2025) with Illingsworth
- Corn Hole Legend (2025) with yeyts.
- Manners (2025) with Brand the Builder
- Tears of Joy (2025)
- Miami Lice: Season Four (2026) with Aesop Rock

=== Mixtapes ===
- There Is No Spoon (2008) with DJ BabeyDrew
- Orphans (2013) with DJ Jav
- Tour Tape (2015)
- LoveLife (2017)
- I Can't Sell These (2022)
- I Can't Sell These Either (2023)
- Nor Can These Be Sold At least By Me (2024)

=== Singles ===
- "King of Kings" (2010)
- "Therapy (Truth Hurts Remix)" (2023)

=== Guest appearances ===
- 2 Hungry Bros. - "Parallel Perpendicular" from My Crew's All Thinner (2009)
- P. Casso - "Best in Show" from For Your Consideration (2009)
- Fresh Daily - "Starter Pistol" from The Gorgeous Killer: In Crimes of Passion (2009)
- DJ Spinna - "Thirst" (2009)
- Mr. Beatz - "The Cipher" from Spit Therapy (2010)
- Ciph Diggy - "Synchronized Rhymin" from Untitled Wave (2010)
- Jonny October - "Brooklyn Bards" from The Wheelhouse (2010)
- J-Live - "Fitness" from Undivided Attention (2010)
- DJ Spinna - "Get On Down" from Sonic Smash (2010)
- Mick Boogie x Terry Urban - "Intro" from Le Da Soul: 20 Years of De La Soul (2010)
- J.J. Brown - "Up to No Good (Remix)" from Connect the Dots (2010)
- Paul White - "A Weird Day" from Rapping with Paul White (2011)
- Mr. SOS – "O!" from Cassette Verité (2011)
- Illus - "Free" from For Adam (2011)
- Blu & Exile - "The Great Escape" from Give Me My Flowers While I Can Still Smell Them (2012)
- Gensu Dean - "Ramesses" (2012)
- Evitan - "Let the Horns Blow" from Speed of Life (2012)
- Jaq - "Hear This" from Escape from Radio Prison (2012)
- Rabbi Darkside - "Clotheslines" from Prospect Avenue (2013)
- Paper Tiger - "The Sting" from Laptop Suntan (2013)
- Paul White - "Find a Way" from Watch the Ants (2013)
- Blu and Nottz - "Crooks in Castles" from Gods in the Spirit (2013)
- J-Live - "Hang On Tight" from Around the Sun (2014)
- L'Orange - "Mind vs. Matter" from The Orchid Days (2014)
- L'Orange and Jeremiah Jae - "Ignore the Man to Your Right" from The Night Took Us In Like Family (2015)
- Until the Ribbon Breaks - "Perspective" from A Lesson Unlearnt (2015)
- Deacon the Villain - "Little Drummer Boy" from Peace or Power (2015)
- Finale - "Just Due" from Odds & Ends (2015)
- The Difference Machine - "Smoke" from The 4th Side of the Eternal Triangle (2016)
- Dillon & Paten Locke - "Hamsammich" from Food Chain (2016)
- Sammus - "Weirdo" from Pieces in Space (2016)
- Gensu Dean - "Where Is the Love" from RAW (Refined Alkaline Water) (2016)
- Onry Ozzborn - "Wine" from Duo (2016)
- Quelle Chris - "Pendulum Swing" from Being You Is Great, I Wish I Could Be You More Often (2017)
- Billy Woods - "Wonderful" from Known Unknowns (2017)
- Rob Sonic - "HORSE" from Latrinalia (2021)
- Aesop Rock & Blockhead - "All Day Breakfast" from Garbology (2021)
