= Joey Raia =

- Birth name: Joey Raia
- Origin: New York City, US
- Genres: Hip hop, pop
- Occupation(s): engineer, mixer
- Website: joeyraia.com

Joey Raia is an American mixing engineer. He is known for his work with Run The Jewels, Aesop Rock, Nick Hook and Mac Miller. In 2017, he was nominated for the 2018 Grammy Awards in the category of "Best Rap Song" for mixing "Chase Me" by Danger Mouse featuring Run The Jewels and Big Boi. Raia's mixes have also been featured in soundtracks including Frozen, Moana, Baby Driver and FIFA 18.

== Discography ==
Artist	Year	Album	Mixer
Lorde	2018	Supercut (El-P Remix)	check
Emmi	2018	Lovers	check
Joe Cardamone	2018	"Holy War"	check
Run The Jewels	2017	Run The Jewels 3	check
Dangermouse feat. Big Boi & Run The Jewels	2017	"Chase Me"	check
Aesop Rock	2016	The Impossible Kid	check
The Veils	2016	Total Depravity	check
Moana	2016	Moana: The Songs	check
Nick Hook	2015	Collage v.1	check
Frozen	2014	Frozen: The Songs	Engineer
Run The Jewels	2014	Run The Jewels 2	check
Diplo	2013	Revolution	check
Mac Miller	2013	Watching Movies with The Sound Off	check
El-P	2013	Cancer4Cure	check
Killer Mike	2012	R.A.P. Music	check
Aesop Rock	2012	Skelethon	check
Hail Mary Mallon	2011	Are You Gonna Eat That?	check
