= Cage discography =

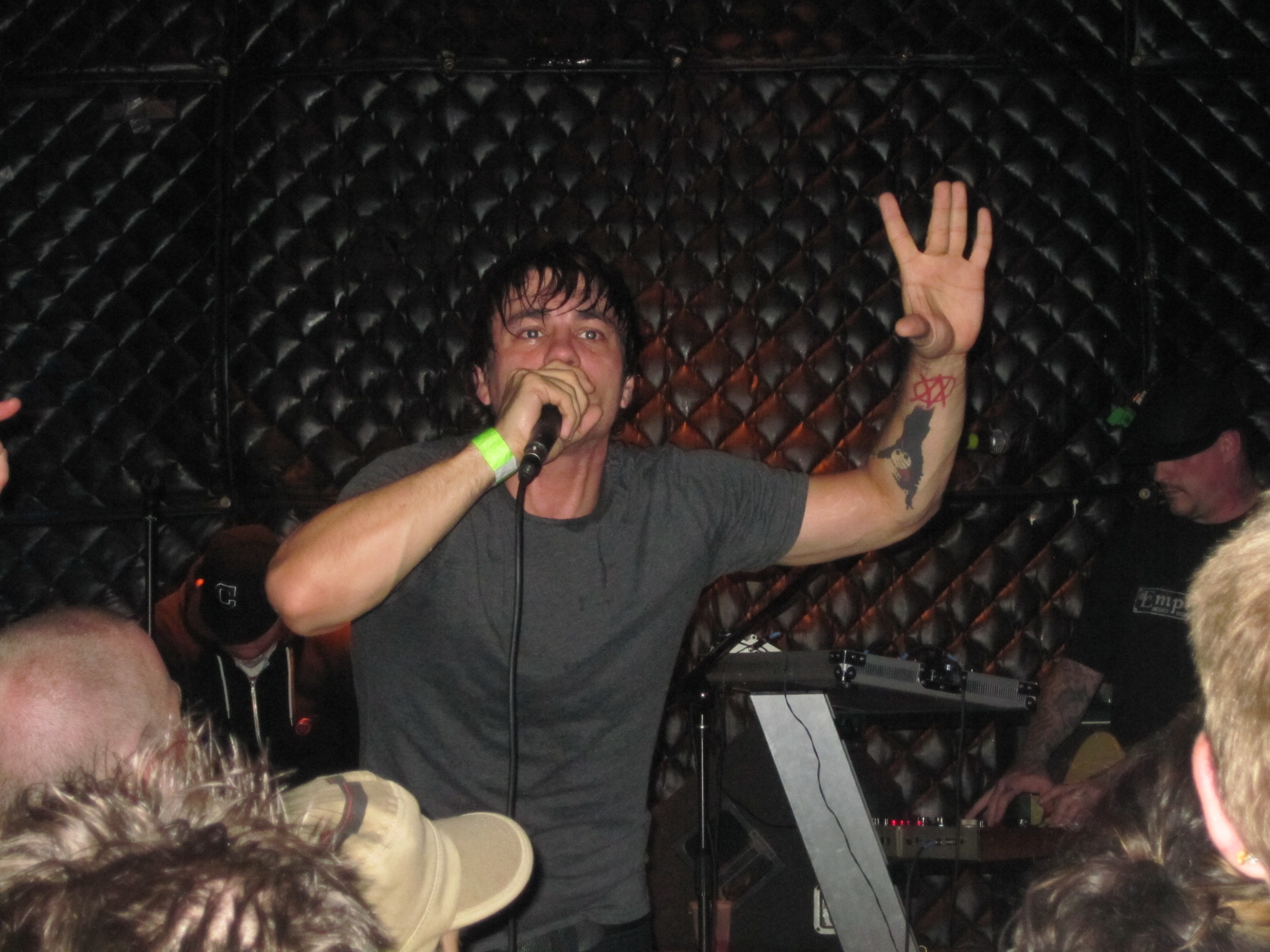
- Studio albums: 5
- Extended plays: 3
- Singles: 3
- Mixtapes: 2

The discography of Cage, an American hip hop recording artist from New York City, consists of five studio albums, two mixtapes, three extended plays, and three singles.

== Albums ==
=== Studio albums ===
Album information
Movies for the Blind
- Released: August 6, 2002
- Billboard 200 chart position: #193
- Billboard Top R&B/Hip-Hop Albums chart position: #58
- Billboard Top Heatseekers chart position: #12
- Billboard Top Independent Albums chart position: #14
- Singles: "Suicidal Failure", "Left Hand Path"
- RIAA Certification: None
Hell's Winter
- Released: September 20, 2005
- Billboard 200 chart position: N/A
- Billboard Top Heatseekers chart position: #26
- Billboard Top Independent Albums chart position: #36
- Singles: "Scenester", "Shoot Frank"
- RIAA Certification: None
Depart from Me
- Released: July 7, 2009
- Billboard 200 chart position: #133
- Billboard Top R&B/Hip-Hop Albums chart position: #58
- Billboard Top Heatseekers chart position: #2
- Billboard Top Independent Albums chart position: #20
- Singles: "I Never Knew You", "I Found My Mind in Connecticut"
- RIAA Certification: None
Kill the Architect
- Released: October 22, 2013
- Billboard 200 chart position: N/A
- Billboard Top Heatseekers chart position: N/A
- Billboard Top Independent Albums chart position: N/A
- Singles: "The Hunt",
- RIAA Certification: None
Book of Sam: Infernal Depths (as Sam Hill)
- Released: August 21, 2018
- Billboard 200 chart position: N/A
- Billboard Top Heatseekers chart position: N/A
- Billboard Top Independent Albums chart position: N/A
- Singles: "Prey to Jesus"
- RIAA Certification: None
The Revenge of Chris Palko
- Released: TBA

=== Mixtapes ===
Album information
For Your Box
- Released: 1999
Purple Rain Vol. 1
- Released: 2003

=== EPs ===
- Mudbone's Madness (as Mudbone) (1994)
- Weatherproof (2003)
- I Never Knew You (2009)

== Collaborative albums ==
=== With Smut Peddlers ===
- Porn Again (2001)

=== With Nighthawks ===
- Nighthawks (2002)

=== With Leak Bros ===
- Waterworld (2004)

== Guest appearances ==
- Aesop Rock ft. Breeze Brewin - Getaway Car
- Cenobites - Hot Crib Promo
- Copywrite - With Us/Tower Of Babel
- Debaser - Pedestals
- Disciples of Jones - Projekt Zero
- El-P - Accidents Don't Happen
- El-P - Oxycontin Pt. 2
- El-P - Habeas Corpses (Draconian Love)
- El-P - Reborn (Jak X Remix)
- Felt - Protagonist (Full Clip Remix)
- Grayskul - How To Load a Tech
- Handsome Boy Modeling School - The Hours
- The High & Mighty - In-Outs
- The High & Mighty - More-Outs
- The High & Mighty - Most-Outs
- N.V.One a.k.a. Judge Doom ft. Wes Restless - Strange Characters
- Kid Cudi - "Maniac" from Man on the Moon II: The Legend of Mr. Rager
- Matty Carlock - Veins
- Porn Theatre Ushers ft. Cage - Balloon Knots
- Project Wyze - Jakobz Ladder
- S.A. Smash - Smash TV
- Slow Suicide Stimulus - Bi-Polar Hi-Rollers
- Tame One - Leak Smoke
- Yak Ballz ft. Bobby Atlas - Pimped Out
- Yak Ballz - Detox
- Admiral Crumple - Glass Vials
- Castro the Savage - The Gutter
- Paranoid Android feat Space, Masai Bey - Beyond and Back/Last House On The Left
- Sadistik - Russian Roulette feat Yes Alexander
- No Pretense - Self Harmonic
- Dead Smoke - The Overcoat
- Weerd Science - Holes
- XO Skeletons - Lascivious Facts

== 12-inch singles ==
CAGE - "Suicidal Failure" 2000 Rawkus Records Side A

- "Suicidal Failure (Clean)"
- "Suicidal Failure (Dirty)"
- "Suicidal Failure (Instrumental)"

Side B

- "The Weather Report featuring Copywrite (Clean)"
- "The Weather Report (Instrumental)"
- "Dust VS. Ecstacy (Dirty)"
- "Dust VS. Ecstacy (Instrumental)"

Album Art - Alex From A Clockwork Orange driving a truck at Cage who is standing on the highway with a city in the background. Album Art Reverse - Doctors working at an operating table.

- Poem: " Leave my dog: Bootlegs, PS2, and dc To my girl Who left me when she said Pick me or PCP. 
All my existing Music to e.c. and my Royalties, if any to my Shorty.
and what ever happens Do Not put me on joints with cats I dont know!!
                           Fuck yaLL"

Produced by DJ Mighty MI for Well Done Berger Productions All songs written by Cage and DJ Mighty MI Agent Alex Music (BMI) 1972UNES (BMI) Figs D. Music.Inc (BMI), Budde Music C/O Bicycle Music Inc. Hook on Dust VS. Ecstacy by CAMUTAO Bass by Vere Issacs Cuts on Weather Report by DJ DAZE Recorded at the Muthafu*#in Spot on Lexington Mixed by Kiernan Walsh & DJ Mighty MI at D&D Studios NYC Mastered by Duncan Stansbury at Frankford Wayne Cover art and design by brianlife @ onebox.com EASTERNCONFERENCERECORDS.COM CAGEVSALEX.COM RAWKUS.COM
