= 2003 in hip-hop =

This article summarizes the events, album releases, and album release dates in hip-hop for the year 2003.

== Events ==
=== January ===
- On January 24, Brazilian rapper Sabotage was murdered in São Paulo.

=== May ===
- On May 19, Camoflauge was murdered in Savannah, Georgia.

=== October ===
- On October 24, Half a Mill committed suicide in Brooklyn, New York City.

=== November ===
- On November 26, Soulja Slim was murdered in Gentilly, New Orleans.

== Released albums ==
Release Date	Artist	Album	Label
January 7	40 Glocc	The Jakal	Zoo Life Entertainment
January 13	Sole	Selling Live Water	Anticon
January 14	Benzino	Redemption	Elektra Records, ZNO Records
January 28	Choppa	Choppa Style	Take Fo' Records
January 28	DMG	Black Roulette	Rap-a-Lot Records
January 28	Zug Izland	Cracked Tiles	Psychopathic Records
February 6	50 Cent	Get Rich or Die Tryin'	Shady Records, Aftermath Entertainment, G-Unit Records, Interscope Records
February 11	DJ Envy	The Desert Storm Mixtape: Blok Party, Vol. 1	Desert Storm Records
February 11	Various Artists	Collect Dis Edition	Duck Down Music
February 18	Monsta Island Czars	Escape from Monsta Island!	Metal Face Records
February 18	Various Artists	Cradle 2 the Grave (soundtrack)	Bloodline Records, Def Jam Recordings
February 18	Zion I	Deep Water Slang V2.0	Raptivism Records
February 18	Dooley-O	Watch My Moves 1990	Solid Records
February 25	Freeway	Philadelphia Freeway	Roc-A-Fella Records, Def Jam Recordings
February 25	J Dilla	Ruff Draft	Mummy Records
February 25	The Majesticons	Beauty Party	Big Dada
February 25	MURS	...The End of the Beginning	Definitive Jux
February 28	Mr. Dibbs	The 30th Song	Rhymesayers Entertainment
March 1	Messy Marv & Marvaless	Bonnie and Clyde	Frisco Street Show
March 4	Choppa	Straight from the N.O.	The New No Limit Records Universal Records
March 4	Fabolous	Street Dreams	Desert Storm Records, Elektra Records
March 4	Lil' Kim	La Bella Mafia	Queen Bee Entertainment, Atlantic Records
March 4	Lil Wyte	Doubt Me Now	Hypnotize Minds Productions
March 4	Various Artists	Bringing Down the House (soundtrack)	Hollywood Records
March 11	Beans	Tomorrow Right Now	Warp Records
March 11	Killer Mike	Monster	Columbia Records
March 11	DJ Muggs	Dust	Anti-
March 11	Various Artists	Dysfunktional Family (soundtrack)	Death Row Records, Priority Records
March 18	Magic	White Eyes	The New No Limit Records Universal Records
March 18	Mr. Cheeks	Back Again!	Universal Records
March 25	The Diplomats	Diplomatic Immunity	Diplomat Records, Roc-A-Fella Records, Def Jam Recordings
March 25	The Fugees	Greatest Hits	Columbia Records
March 25	Tame One	When Rappers Attack	Eastern Conference Records
April 1	M.O.P.	10 Years and Gunnin'	Columbia Records
April 8	Anybody Killa	Hatchet Warrior	Psychopathic Records
April 8	Jay-Z	The Blueprint 2.1	
April 8	Scarface	Balls and My Word	Rap-a-Lot Records
April 15	Kurtis Blow	20th Century Masters – The Millennium Collection: The Best of Kurtis Blow	Mercury Records
April 15	Various Artists	Malibu's Most Wanted (soundtrack)	Universal Records
April 27	Z-Ro	Z-Ro Tolerance	Kmj
April 29	Bone Crusher	AttenCHUN!	So So Def Recordings, Arista Records
April 29	Keith Murray	He's Keith Murray	Def Jam Recordings
May 5	Vakill	The Darkest Cloud	Molemen Records
May 6	54th Platoon	All or Nothin'	FUBU Records
May 6	Prince Paul	Politics of the Business	Razor & Tie
May 13	Fiend	Can I Burn? 2	Fiend Entertainment
May 20	Akrobatik	Balance	Coup D'État
May 20	David Banner	Mississippi: The Album	SRC Records
May 20	DJ Kay Slay	The Streetsweeper, Vol. 1	
May 20	Various Artists	2 Fast 2 Furious (soundtrack)	
May 23	Diam's	Brut de femme	Hostile Records
May 27	Brother Ali	Shadows on the Sun	Rhymesayers Entertainment
June 3	Aceyalone	Love & Hate	Project Blowed, Decon
June 3	Gold Chains	Young Miss America	
June 3	Orko the Sykotik Alien	Atoms of Eden	Plague Language
June 3	S.A. Smash	Smashy Trashy	Definitive Jux
June 10	C-Bo	West Side Ryders	West Coast Mafia Records
June 10	Joe Budden	Joe Budden	Def Jam Records
June 10	Inspectah Deck	The Movement	Koch Records
June 10	Mo Thugs	The Movement	Riviera Records
June 10	Naughty by Nature	Naughty's Nicest	Tommy Boy Records, Rhino Entertainment Company
June 16	Ugly Duckling	Taste the Secret	Emperor Norton Records, Rykodisc
June 16	Why?	Oaklandazulasylum	Anticon
June 17	A Tribe Called Quest	Hits, Rarities & Remixes	The Ummah
June 17	Michael Franti & Spearhead	Everyone Deserves Music	Boo Boo Wax, iMusic
June 17	King Geedorah	Take Me to Your Leader	Big Dada
June 17	UGK	Best of UGK	Jive Records
June 17	Nephlim Modulation Systems	Woe to Thee O Land Whose King Is a Child	Ninja Tune
June 17	Onry Ozzborn	The Grey Area	One Drop Records
June 17	PMD	The Awakening	Solid Records
June 24	Black Eyed Peas	Elephunk	A&M Records, will.i.am Music Group
June 24	Gang Starr	The Ownerz	Virgin Records, EMI
June 24	King Gordy	The Entity	Web Entertainment
June 24	KRS-One	Kristyles	Koch Records
July 1	Lifesavas	Spirit in Stone	Quannum Projects
July 1	Various Artists	Totally Hip Hop	BMG/Warner Music Group
July 1	Twiztid	The Green Book	Psychopathic Records
July 8	Slim Thug & Lil' Keke	The Big Unit	Rap-A-Lot Records
July 8	Fannypack	So Stylistic	Tommy Boy Entertainment
July 8	Killah Priest	Black August	Recon Records
July 15	RZA	The World According to RZA	
July 15	Chingy	Jackpot	Disturbing Tha Peace
July 15	Various Artists	Bad Boys II (soundtrack)	
July 21	Dizzee Rascal	Boy in da Corner	XL Recordings
July 22	Canibus	Rip the Jacker	Mic Club Music, Babygrande Records
July 22	Violent J	Wizard of the Hood	Psychopathic Records
July 23	Pegz	Capricorn Cat	Obese Records
August 12	State Property	The Chain Gang Vol. 2	Roc-A-Fella Records, Def Jam Recordings
August 19	Bow Wow	Unleashed	Columbia Records
August 19	T.I.	Trap Muzik	Grand Hustle Records, Atlantic Records
August 19	Juelz Santana	From Me to U	Diplomat Records, Roc-A-Fella Records, Def Jam Recordings
August 19	Mars Ill	Backbreakanomics	Gotee Records
August 19	The Neptunes	The Neptunes Present... Clones	Star Trak Entertainment, Arista Records
August 19	Lil Zane	The Big Zane Theory	Priority Records, Capitol Music Group
August 25	Hermitude	Alleys to Valleys	Elefant Traks, Inertia Distribution
August 26	Boo & Gotti	Perfect Timing	Cash Money Records, Universal Records
August 26	Frayser Boy	Gone on That Bay	Hypnotize Minds Productions
August 26	Jedi Mind Tricks	Visions of Gandhi	Babygrande Records
August 26	Kool Keith	The Lost Masters	DMAFT Records
August 26	Magic	On My Own	Koch Records
August 26	Nappy Roots	Wooden Leather	Atlantic Records
August 26	YoungBloodZ	Drankin' Patnaz	So So Def Recordings, Arista Records
September 2	Soul-Junk	1958	Sounds Are Active, Sounds Familyre
September 2	Various Artists	Suburban Noize Presents: Sub-Noize Rats	Suburban Noize Records
September 8	Mark Ronson	Here Comes the Fuzz	Elektra Records
September 9	Danger Mouse & Jemini	Ghetto Pop Life	Lex Records
September 9	E-40	Breakin' News	Sick Wid It Records, Jive Records
September 9	Sir Mix-a-Lot	Daddy's Home	Rhyme Cartel
September 11	Pięć Dwa Dębiec	P-ń VI	UMC Records
September 16	Bubba Sparxxx	Deliverance	Beat Club, Interscope Records
September 16	Daara J	Boomerang	Wrasse Records
September 16	DMX	Grand Champ	Ruff Ryders Entertainment, Def Jam Recordings
September 16	Semi.Official	The Anti-Album	Rhymesayers Entertainment
September 16	Sheek Louch	Walk witt Me	D-Block Records, Universal Records
September 16	Viktor Vaughn	Vaudeville Villain	Sound-Ink Records, Traffic Entertainment Group
September 16	Various Artists	Music Inspired by Scarface	Def Jam Recordings
September 16	Ying Yang Twins	Me & My Brother	TVT Records
September 22	Hilltop Hoods	The Calling	Obese Records
September 22	Themselves	Them	Anticon
September 23	Aesop Rock	Bazooka Tooth	Definitive Jux
September 23	Atmosphere	Seven's Travels	Rhymesayers Entertainment, Epitaph Records
September 23	Baby Bash	Tha Smokin' Nephew	Latium Records, Universal Records
September 23	Obie Trice	Cheers	Shady Records, Interscope Records
September 23	Outkast	Speakerboxxx/The Love Below	LaFace Records, Arista Records
September 23	Murphy Lee	Murphy's Law	Derrty Entertainment, Universal Music Group
September 23	Jeru the Damaja	Divine Design	Ashenafi Records
September 29	So Solid Crew	2nd Verse	Independiente Limited
September 29	Non-Prophets	Hope	Lex Records
October 7	Black Moon	Total Eclipse	Duck Down Music Inc.
October 7	Hieroglyphics	Full Circle	Hieroglyphics Imperium Recordings
October 7	The High & Mighty	The Highlite Zone	Eastern Conference Records
October 7	Jaylib	Champion Sound	Stones Throw Records
October 7	Ludacris	Chicken-n-Beer	Disturbing tha Peace, Def Jam Recordings
October 7	Lyrics Born	Later That Day	Quannum Projects
October 7	Paris	Sonic Jihad	Guerrilla Funk Recordings
October 7	Randy Savage	Be a Man	Big3 Records
October 7	Roc Raida	Champion Sounds	DMC Records
October 7	RZA	Birth of a Prince	Sanctuary Urban, BMG Records
October 7	Shabazz the Disciple	The Book of Shabazz (Hidden Scrollz)	Battle Axe
October 7	Soul Position	8 Million Stories	Rhymesayers Entertainment
October 14	Noah23	Tau Ceti	Plague Language
October 21	Loon	Loon	Bad Boy Records
October 21	Tragedy Khadafi	Still Reportin'...	Solid Records, 25 To Life Records
November 4	Fabolous	More Street Dreams, Pt. 2: The Mixtape	Desert Storm Records, Elektra Records
November 4	Ja Rule	Blood in My Eye	Murder Inc. Records, Def Jam Recordings
November 4	Wyclef Jean	The Preacher's Son	J Records
November 4	Diverse	One A.M.	Chocolate Industries
November 4	Buck 65	Talkin' Honky Blues	WEA
November 7	Eminem	Straight from the Lab	Universal Music Group
November 11	2Pac	Tupac: Resurrection soundtrack	Amaru Entertainment, Interscope Records
November 11	Various Artists	Honey (soundtrack)	Elektra Records
November 14	G-Unit	Beg for Mercy	G-Unit Records, Interscope Records
November 14	Jay-Z	The Black Album	Roc-A-Fella Records, Def Jam Recordings
November 14	Stu Dent	Nephilim: Act of God 1	Illect Recordings
November 18	Biz Markie	Weekend Warrior	Tommy Boy Entertainment
November 18	Cex	Maryland Mansions	Jade Tree Records
November 18	Charizma & Peanut Butter Wolf	Big Shots	Stones Throw Records
November 18	Esham	Repentance	Psychopathic Records
November 18	Immortal Technique	Revolutionary Vol. 2	Viper Records
November 18	KMD	Best of KMD	Nature Sounds
November 18	Psychopathic Records	Psychopathics from Outer Space 2	Psychopathic Records
November 18	Swollen Members	Heavy	Battle Axe Records
November 25	Missy Elliott	This Is Not a Test!	The Goldmind Inc., Elektra Records
November 25	Lil' Keke	Changin' Lanes	Commission Music
November 25	Nelly	Da Derrty Versions: The Reinvention	Universal Records
December 5	O.S.T.R.	Jazz W Wolnych Chwilach	Asfalt Records
December 7	B.U.G. Mafia	Băieții Buni	Casa Productions, Cat Music, Media Services, Sony Music
December 9	Big Tymers	Big Money Heavyweight	Cash Money Records, Universal Records
December 9	Various Artists	The Source Presents: Hip Hop Hits, Vol. 7	Image Entertainment
December 9	Nick Cannon	Nick Cannon	Nickelodeon Records, Jive Records
December 9	Westside Connection	Terrorist Threats	Hoo-Bangin' Records
December 9	Snoop Doggy Dogg	Tha Dogg: Best of the Works	Death Row Records
December 10	Pep Love	Ascension Side C	Hieroglyphics Imperium Recordings
December 16	Memphis Bleek	M.A.D.E.	Get Low Records, Roc-A-Fella Records, Def Jam Recordings
December 23	Bravehearts	Bravehearted	Ill Will Records, Columbia Records
December 23	David Banner	MTA2: Baptized in Dirty Water	SRC Records, Big Face Entertainment, Universal Records
December 23	Juvenile	Juve the Great	Cash Money Records, UTP Records, Universal Records
December 23	Various Artists	You Got Served (soundtrack)	Epic Records
Unknown	Army of the Pharaohs	Rare Shit, Collabos and Freestyles	Unlabelled

== Highest-charting singles ==
Hip hop singles which charted in the Top 40 of the Billboard Hot 100
Title	Artist	Peak position
"In da Club"	50 Cent	1
"21 Questions"	50 Cent featuring Nate Dogg	1
"Stand Up"	Ludacris featuring Shawnna	1
"Mesmerize"	Ja Rule featuring Ashanti	2
"Get Low"	Lil Jon & the East Side Boyz featuring Ying Yang Twins	2
"Magic Stick"	Lil' Kim featuring 50 Cent	2
"Right Thurr"	Chingy	2
"One Call Away"	Chingy featuring J-Weav	2
"P.I.M.P."	50 Cent featuring Snoop Dogg & G-Unit	3
"Holidae In"	Chingy featuring Ludacris & Snoop Dogg	3
"Air Force Ones"	Nelly featuring Kyujan, Ali & Murphy Lee	3
"I Know What You Want"	Busta Rhymes & Mariah Carey featuring Flipmode Squad	3
"Can't Let You Go"	Fabolous featuring Lil' Mo & Mike Shorey	4
"Into You"	Fabolous featuring Tamia or Ashanti	4
"Damn!"	YoungBloodz featuring Lil Jon	4
"Frontin'"	Pharrell Williams featuring Jay-Z	5
"Splash Waterfalls"	Ludacris featuring Sandy Coffee	6
"Beautiful"	Snoop Dogg featuring Pharrell Williams & Charlie Wilson	6
"Where Is the Love?"	The Black Eyed Peas featuring Justin Timberlake	8
"Excuse Me Miss"	Jay-Z	8
"Change Clothes"	Jay-Z featuring Pharrell Williams	10
"I Can"	Nas	12
"Wanksta"	50 Cent	13
"Stunt 101"	G-Unit	13
"Sing For The Moment"	Eminem	14
"Let's Get Down"	Bow Wow featuring Birdman	14
"Superman"	Eminem featuring Dina Rae	15
"Wanna Get to Know You"	G-Unit featuring Joe	15
"The Jump Off"	Lil' Kim featuring Mr. Cheeks	16
"Wat Da Hook Gon Be"	Murphy Lee featuring Jermaine Dupri	17
"Runnin' (Dying to Live)"	2Pac featuring The Notorious B.I.G.	19
"Let's Get It Started"	The Black Eyed Peas	21
"Hey Mama"	The Black Eyed Peas featuring Tippa Irie	23
"Never Scared"	Bone Crusher featuring T.I. and Killer Mike	26
"Pass That Dutch"	Missy Elliott	27
"Made You Look"	Nas	32
"Do That..."	Birdman featuring P. Diddy	33
"Paradise"	LL Cool J featuring Amerie	36
"Pump It Up"	Joe Budden	38

== Highest first-week sales ==
List of top ten albums released in 2003, according to first-week home market sales
Number	Album	Artist	1st-week sales	1st-week position
1	Get Rich or Die Tryin'	50 Cent	872,000	1
2	Speakerboxxx/The Love Below	OutKast	510,000	1
3	The Black Album	Jay-Z	463,000	1
4	Tupac: Resurrection	2Pac	430,000	2
5	Chicken-n-Beer	Ludacris	429,000	1
6	Beg for Mercy	G-Unit	377,000	3
7	Bad Boys II	Various Artists	324,000	1
8	Grand Champ	DMX	312,000	1
9	The Neptunes Present... Clones	The Neptunes	249,000	1
10	Cheers	Obie Trice	226,000	5

== All critically reviewed albums ranked (Metacritic) ==
Number	Artist	Album	Average score	Number of reviews	Reference
1	Dizzee Rascal	Boy in da Corner	92	28 reviews	
2	Outkast	Speakerboxxx/The Love Below	91	26 reviews	
3	Jay-Z	The Black Album	84	19 reviews	
4	Bubba Sparxxx	Deliverance	82	17 reviews	
5	Soul Position	8 Million Stories	82	8 reviews	
6	Missy Elliott	This Is Not a Test!	79	21 reviews	
7	Nappy Roots	Wooden Leather	79	9 reviews	
8	FannyPack	So Stylistic	78	16 reviews	
9	Northern State	Dying in Stereo	77	17 reviews	
10	Sole	Selling Live Water	77	9 reviews	
11	Ludacris	Chicken & Beer	75	10 reviews	
12	The Majesticons	Beauty Party	75	9 reviews	
13	Aesop Rock	Bazooka Tooth	74	16 reviews	
14	Freeway	Philadelphia Freeway	74	7 reviews	
15	50 Cent	Get Rich or Die Tryin'	73	19 reviews	
16	Beans	Tomorrow Right Now	73	14 reviews	
17	Obie Trice	Cheers	73	12 reviews	
18	Atmosphere	Seven's Travels	72	14 reviews	
19	Gold Chains	Young Miss America	72	12 reviews	
20	Ugly Duckling	Taste The Secret	72	8 reviews	
21	Michael Franti & Spearhead	Everyone Deserves Music	71	4 reviews	
22	Gang Starr	The Ownerz	70	17 reviews	
23	Why?	Oaklandazulasylum	70	8 reviews	
24	Mr. Cheeks	Back Again!	67	4 reviews	
25	Black Eyed Peas	Elephunk	66	15 reviews	
26	Aceyalone	Love & Hate	66	9 reviews	
27	Prince Paul	Politics of the Business	65	15 reviews	
28	Lil Kim	La Bella Mafia	65	11 reviews	
29	G-Unit	Beg for Mercy	62	11 reviews	
30	RZA	Birth of a Prince	62	11 reviews	
31	Wyclef Jean	The Preacher's Son	61	6 reviews	
32	DMX	Grand Champ	58	12 reviews	
33	Fabolous	Street Dreams	51	13 reviews	
34	Ja Rule	Blood in My Eye	45	8 reviews	

== See also ==
- Previous article: 2002 in hip-hop
- Next article: 2004 in hip-hop
