= Waterworld (Leak Bros album) =

Studio album by Leak Bros
- Released: July 13, 2004
- Recorded: 2003–2004
- Genre: Hip-hop
- Length: 41:41
- Label: Eastern Conference Records; ECLP1006
- Producer: Camu Tao; DJ Mighty Mi; El-P; RJD2; Mondee; J-Zone; Emz; Grimace; Kool Mellow Max 165

Cage chronology
| Weatherproof (2003) | Waterworld (2004) | Hell's Winter (2005) |

Tame One chronology
| When Rappers Attack (2003) | Waterworld (2004) | O.G. Bobby Johnson (2004) |

Professional ratings
Review scores
| Source | Rating |
|---|---|
| HipHopDX | 8/10 |

Waterworld, is the only studio album by American hip-hop duo Leak Bros, which consisted of Cage and Tame One. It was released on July 13, 2004 under Eastern Conference Records.

== Background ==
Every song on Waterworld is about the drug PCP. Street names for PCP like "water," "wet," "leak," "fry", "sherm," "dip," "death," "angel dust," "dust," "purple rain," "embalming fluid," and "formaldehyde" are all constantly referenced throughout the album. Cage and Tame One frequently mention "dipping" cigarettes, blunts and other smoking material in PCP.

== Music ==
The album features production from Camu Tao, DJ Mighty Mi, El-P, J-Zone, RJD2, Mondee, Grimace, Kool Mellow Max 165, and Emz. Guest vocal appearances include Yak Ballz.

== Release ==
The single "Got Wet" b/w G.O.D. was released on July 20, 2004. Waterworld is the only release of the group.

== Track listing ==
| No. | Title | Producer | Length |
|---|---|---|---|
| 1. | "PCP Ward (Intro)" | DJ Mighty Mi | 0:48 |
| 2. | "Got Wet" (featuring Yak Ballz) | Camu Tao | 4:01 |
| 3. | "Waterworld" | Camu Tao | 4:41 |
| 4. | "See Thru" | Mondee | 3:33 |
| 5. | "G.O.D." | J-Zone | 4:19 |
| 6. | "Gimmesumdeath" | RJD2 | 4:14 |
| 7. | "Follow the Liters" | Grimace | 2:53 |
| 8. | "Dead" | DJ Mighty Mi, Camu Tao | 4:27 |
| 9. | "Druggie Fresh" | Kool Mellow Max 165 | 2:38 |
| 10. | "Delerium" | Camu Tao | 3:28 |
| 11. | "Leakie Leak (Skit)" | DJ Mighty Mi | 0:25 |
| 12. | "Stargate" | DJ Mighty Mi | 2:01 |
| 13. | "Submerged" | El-P | 3:26 |
| 14. | "Outro" | Emz | 0:47 |
