= Movies for the Blind =

Studio album by Cage
- Released: August 6, 2002
- Studio: The Muthafuckin' Spot On Lexington
- Genre: Hip-hop
- Length: 58:08
- Label: Eastern Conference
- Producer: Camu Tao; DJ Mighty Mi; El-P; J-Zone; Red Spyda; RJD2; Necro; The Ghetto Pros

Cage chronology
| Porn Again (2001) | Movies for the Blind (2002) | Nighthawks (2002) |

Singles from Movies for the Blind
- 1. "Radiohead / Agent Orange" Released: 1997; 2. "Suicidal Failure" Released: 2000; 3. "The Left Hand Path / Escape to '88" Released: 2002

Movies for the Blind is the debut solo studio album by American rapper Cage. It was released on August 6, 2002, through Eastern Conference Records. Recording sessions took place at The Muthafuckin' Spot On Lexington. Production was handled by DJ Mighty Mi, Camu Tao, El-P, J-Zone, Necro, Red Spyda, RJD2 and the Ghetto Professionals. It features guest appearances from Copywrite and Mr. Eon. The album peaked at number 193 on the Billboard 200 chart in the United States.

== Critical reception ==
Professional ratings
Review scores
| Source | Rating |
|---|---|
| AllMusic | 3/5 stars |
| The A.V. Club | favorable |
| HipHopDX | 4/5 |
| laut.de | 4/5 stars |
| Prefix | 7/10 |
| RapReviews | 8.5/10 |

Martin Woodside of AllMusic gave the album 3 stars out of 5, saying: "Most of the songs here are built around fantasy, and Cage's fantasies tend to be dark and angry, revolving around sex, violence, and substance abuse". He added: "The team of producers lays down a diverse blend of styles that matches Cage's bizarre, brooding vocals from beginning to end". Nathan Rabin of The A.V. Club said, "it confirms Cage as a major talent while going a long way toward justifying his reputation as an eccentric genius".

In 2015, Fact placed it at number 39 on the "100 Best Indie Hip-Hop Records of All Time" list.

== Track listing ==
| No. | Title | Writer(s) | Producer(s) | Length |
|---|---|---|---|---|
| 1. | "Morning Dips" | Chris Palko; Milo Berger | DJ Mighty Mi | 1:10 |
| 2. | "Escape to '88" | Palko; Berger | DJ Mighty Mi | 3:45 |
| 3. | "(Down) The Left Hand Path" | Palko; Andy Thelusma | Rush | 4:05 |
| 4. | "Teen Age Death" | Palko; Tero Smith | Camu Tao | 4:10 |
| 5. | "Too Much" | Palko; Mike Heron; Victor Padilla | The Ghetto Professionals | 4:05 |
| 6. | "In Stoney Lodge" | Palko; Jay Mumford | J-Zone | 3:34 |
| 7. | "Probably Causes Paranoia" | Palko; Berger | DJ Mighty Mi | 0:55 |
| 8. | "The Soundtrack..." | Palko; Berger | DJ Mighty Mi | 2:57 |
| 9. | "Among the Sleep" | Palko; Ramble Krohn | RJD2 | 3:50 |
| 10. | "Agent Orange" | Palko; Ron Braunstein | Necro | 5:11 |
| 11. | "A Suicidal Failure" | Palko; Berger | DJ Mighty Mi | 4:30 |
| 12. | "CK Won" | Palko; Berger | DJ Mighty Mi | 3:32 |
| 13. | "Unlike Tower 1" (featuring Copywrite and Mr. Eon) | Palko; Peter Nelson; Eric Meltzer; Berger | DJ Mighty Mi | 4:28 |
| 14. | "Under Satan's Authority" | | DJ Mighty Mi | 0:45 |
| 15. | "A Crowd Killer" | Palko; Berger | DJ Mighty Mi | 3:03 |
| 16. | "The Right Out" | | | 0:48 |
| 17. | "Holdin a Jar 2" | Palko; Jaime Meline | El-P | 3:46 |
| 18. | "Pussy, Money and War" (featuring Copywrite) | Palko; Nelson; Berger | DJ Mighty Mi | 3:37 |
| Total length: | | | | 58:08 |

== Personnel ==
Credits adapted from liner notes.

- Chris "Cage" Palko – vocals, executive producer, sleeve notes
- Claire – vocals (track 7)
- Peter "Copywrite" Nelson – vocals (tracks: 13, 18)
- Eric "Mr. Eon" Meltzer – vocals (track 13)
- Milo "DJ Mighty Mi" Berger – turntables (track 4), producer (tracks: 1, 2, 7, 8, 11–15, 18), executive producer
- Vere Isaacs – bass guitar (track 8)
- Joseph W. "DJ Riz" Rizzo – turntables (track 10)
- Rob "Reef" Tewlow – additional instruments (track 12)
- Andy "Rush" Thelusma – producer (track 3)
- Tero "Camu Tao" Smith – producer (track 4)
- Mike "Heron" Herard – producer (track 5)
- Victor "V.I.C." Padilla – producer (track 5)
- Jay "J-Zone" Mumford – producer (track 6)
- Ramble "RJD2" Krohn – producer (track 9)
- Ron "Necro" Braunstein – producer (track 10)
- Jaime "El-P" Meline – producer (track 17)
- Kieran Walsh – mixing
- Adrian "Stretch Armstrong" Bartos – mixing (track 10)
- Michael Sarsfield – mastering

== Charts ==
| Chart | Peak position |
|---|---|
| US Billboard 200 | 193 |
| US Heatseekers Albums (Billboard) | 12 |
| US Independent Albums (Billboard) | 14 |
| US Top R&B/Hip-Hop Albums (Billboard) | 58 |
