= Fast Cars, Danger, Fire and Knives =

EP by Aesop Rock
- Released: February 22, 2005
- Genre: Hip-hop
- Length: 30:41
- Label: Definitive Jux
- Producers: Blockhead, Aesop Rock, Rob Sonic

Aesop Rock chronology
Bazooka Tooth (2003)	Fast Cars, Danger, Fire and Knives (2005)	None Shall Pass (2007)

Professional ratings
Aggregate scores
Source	Rating
Metacritic	69/100
Review scores
Source	Rating
AllMusic	3/5 stars
The Austin Chronicle	3/4 stars
Blender	3/5 stars
Pitchfork	7.9/10
Spin	B

Fast Cars, Danger, Fire and Knives is an EP by American hip-hop artist Aesop Rock. Released via the Definitive Jux label on February 22, 2005, the record is produced by Blockhead and Aesop Rock himself, with the former producing three tracks and the latter producing four, with one track produced by Rob Sonic. Vocals are handled by Aesop Rock, with guest appearances from Camu Tao and Metro of S.A. Smash and Definitive Jux label head El-P. All scratches are performed by DJ Big Wiz.

== Release ==
The initial pressing of the EP on CD (catalogue number DJX106) was packaged as a slimline CD case inside a cardboard cover along with an 88-page booklet named The Living Human Curiosity Sideshow, which contained the EP's lyrics as well as the never-before published lyrics to Aesop's other in-print records, Float, Labor Days, Daylight, and Bazooka Tooth, and new photographs and artwork.

The record's art as a whole, in keeping with the title of the lyric book, is designed around the theme of an early 20th-century freak show: "The Most Peculiar Creatures in All The Land", proclaims the back cover, while a triptych of blackly humorous portraits on the inner CD case depict Bruce The Giant Baby ("7 years old & 600(+) pounds"), Three Legged Louis ("3 shoes, 6 laces, 15 toes") and Ms. Sally Small ("the world's tiniest woman").

The subsequent pressing of the EP (catalogue number DJX117) omitted the lyric booklet but included a bonus track, "Facemelter".

== Track listing ==
No.	Title	Producer(s)	Length
1.	"Fast Cars"	Blockhead	4:34
2.	"Number Nine"	Blockhead	4:05
3.	"Zodiaccupuncture"	Aesop Rock	4:21
4.	"Holy Smokes"	Blockhead	3:51
5.	"Winners Take All"	Rob Sonic	4:45
6.	"Rickety Rackety" (featuring Camu Tao and El-P)	Aesop Rock	4:30
7.	"Food, Clothes, Medicine"	Aesop Rock	4:35
8.	"Facemelter" (DJX117 only bonus track)	Aesop Rock	5:05

== Charts ==
Chart (2005)	Peak position
US Billboard 200	190
US Independent Albums (Billboard)	21
US Heatseekers Albums (Billboard)	9
US Top R&B/Hip-Hop Albums (Billboard)	100
