= Nighthawks (Nighthawks album) =

Studio album by Nighthawks
- Released: November 26, 2002
- Recorded: 2001–2002
- Genre: Hip-hop
- Length: 41:35
- Label: Eastern Conference Records
- Producer: Camu Tao; DJ Mighty Mi; True-Skill

Cage chronology
Movies for the Blind (2002)	Nighthawks (2002)	Weatherproof (2003)

Camu Tao chronology
Nighthawks (2002)	Blair Cosby: Cape Cod (Going for De Gold) (2004)

Professional ratings
Review scores
Source	Rating
RapReviews	7/10
AllMusic	3/5 stars
The A.V. Club	Mixed

Nighthawks is the only studio album by American hip-hop duo Nighthawks, which consisted of rappers Cage and Camu Tao. It was released on November 26, 2002, under Eastern Conference Records. The album is a rap opera concept album.

== Background ==
Nighthawks came to be through Cage's love for police movies. It puts Cage and Camu Tao in the personas of fictional police detectives "Deke DaSilva" and "Matthew Fox". The album was created in a one-week creative binge.

== Music ==
The album is mostly produced by Camu Tao and DJ Mighty Mi, with one song's production by DJ Trueskillz. Guest appearances include Tame One, Metro of S.A. Smash, Space and The High & Mighty.

== Track listing ==
No.	Title	Producer	Length
1.	"The Briefing"	DJ Mighty Mi	0:51
2.	"N.R.A"	Camu Tao; DJ Mighty Mi	4:30
3.	"The Trailor" (featuring Tame One)	Camu Tao; DJ Mighty Mi	4:42
4.	"Cop Hell"	DJ Mighty Mi	3:52
5.	"Strip Search (Skit)"	DJ Mighty Mi	0:37
6.	"Keep The City Up"	Camu Tao; DJ Mighty Mi	3:51
7.	"Car Chase" (featuring Metro)	Camu Tao	3:07
8.	"NY.PD (Skit)"	DJ Mighty Mi	1:41
9.	"Count Crackula" (featuring Space)	DJ Trueskillz	3:55
10.	"Nighthawks"	Camu Tao	4:14
11.	"Let 'Em Go Matt (Skit)"	DJ Mighty Mi	0:38
12.	"P.C. (Police Crime)"	DJ Mighty Mi	3:15
13.	"Bomb Beach" (featuring The High & Mighty)	DJ Mighty Mi	2:14
14.	"Street Poly"	Camu Tao	4:08
