= When Rappers Attack =

Studio album by Tame One
- Released: March 25, 2003
- Genre: Hip hop
- Length: 40:04
- Label: Eastern Conference Records
- Producer: Camu Tao; J-Zone; RJD2; DJ Mighty Mi; Reef; Johnny Dangerous; Maliq "DJ P*rno" Griffin

Tame One chronology
When Rappers Attack (2003)	O.G. Bobby Johnson (2004)

Singles from When Rappers Attack
- 1. "When Rappers Attack" Released: 2003

When Rappers Attack is the first solo studio album by American hip hop artist Tame One. It was released by Eastern Conference Records on March 25, 2003.

== Background ==
Tame One was one half of Artifacts along with El Da Sensei. After the breakup of the group in 1997, he linked up with DJ Mighty Mi and company, and signed a deal with the record label Eastern Conference Records. Having contributed several tracks to the Eastern Conference All Stars compilation albums, he set out to develop his solo album, When Rappers Attack. Produced by Camu Tao, J-Zone, RJD2, DJ Mighty Mi, Reef, Johnny Dangerous, and Maliq "DJ P*rno" Griffin, it featured a guest appearance from Cage.

== Critical reception ==
Professional ratings
Review scores
Source	Rating
AllMusic	3/5 stars
HipHopDX	7/10
RapReviews.com	8/10
XLR8R	mixed

Jason MacNeil of AllMusic gave the album 3 stars out of 5, stating, "A '70s soul tempo on 'Dreamz' is the record's highlight, a song that brings to mind 2Pac." J-23 of HipHopDX gave the album a 7 out of 10, commenting that "Being a part of the Eastern Conference squad comes with some privileges, most notably their top-notch production team." Pete Babb of XLR8R wrote, "It's a shame Tame couldn't be backed with better beats to make this a complete package, but as a rhyming exposition, When Rappers Attack succeeds admirably."

In 2015, Fact placed it at number 74 on the "100 Best Indie Hip-Hop Records of All Time" list.

== Track listing ==
No.	Title	Producer(s)	Length
1.	"When Rappers Attack"	Camu Tao	3:56
2.	"Heat"	J-Zone	3:07
3.	"Act Right"	Camu Tao	4:02
4.	"Tame as It Ever Was"	J-Zone	3:11
5.	"Slick Talkin'"	J-Zone	1:41
6.	"Up 2 No Good Again"	RJD2	3:52
7.	"Leak Smoke" (featuring Cage)	DJ Mighty Mi	4:12
8.	"Dreamz"	Reef	4:20
9.	"Concerto"	Johnny Dangerous	1:47
10.	"Moment I Feared"	DJ Mighty Mi	3:43
11.	"Iz It Me?"	Johnny Dangerous	2:24
12.	"Homage 2 da Bomberz"	Maliq "DJ P*rno" Griffin	3:49
Total length:			40:04

== Personnel ==
Credits adapted from liner notes.

- Tame One – vocals, graffiti, executive production
- Camu Tao – production (1, 3), additional programming (7)
- J-Zone – production (2, 4, 5), turntables (4)
- RJD2 – production (6)
- Cage – vocals (7)
- DJ Mighty Mi – production (7, 10), turntables (7), executive production
- Reef – production (8)
- Johnny Dangerous – production (9, 11)
- Maliq "DJ P*rno" Griffin – production (12)
- Kieran Walsh – mixing
- Michael Sarsfield – mastering
- Merge One – art direction, design
- Jeru – art direction, design
- MA*D – photography, executive production
- Manuel Acevedo – photography
- Swiftflix – photography
- Killah Kev – graphics
