= Depart from Me =

Studio album by Cage
- Released: July 7, 2009
- Genre: Rap rock; horrorcore
- Length: 46:10
- Label: Definitive Jux
- Producer: El-P; Sean "F. Sean" Martin; Cage; Aesop Rock

Cage chronology
Hell's Winter (2005)	Depart from Me (2009)	Kill the Architect (2013)

Depart from Me is the third solo studio album by American rapper Cage. It was released by Definitive Jux on July 7, 2009. It peaked at number 133 on the Billboard 200 chart.

== Production ==
Cage describes Depart from Me as being "an exorcism of sorts", stating that it is more personal than his previous albums. Cage states that the album's lyrics do not focus on social commentary, but instead deal with life and "things that people can relate to". The album continues from the lyrical direction of Hell's Winter and distancing himself from the persona featured on Movies for the Blind. Cage felt that since becoming a father, he no longer wished to write the same type of lyrical content as he had in the past. Cage stated that "if people can't understand that, that's good, because I don't want to make music for assholes." While Hell's Winter deals with personal change, Depart from Me deals with the difficulty of implementing these changes.

Describing the recording process, Cage remembers that El-P had been working on a track, and Cage soon thought of a hook that would fit the song, and recorded its freestyle lyrics on the couch. El-P and Cage later decided not to record a studio take of the track "because it just had a vibe to it."

In a departure from the rapper's previous sample-driven albums, Depart from Me consists of rap rock tracks that feature "surging bass, mountains of guitar feedback, and fuzzy synth". Cage describes the album as incorporating pop influences while keeping an "indie sensibility". Cage states that he wanted to produce music that would appeal to a larger audience. Cage states that he did not intend to produce an album that would replicate early attempts to fuse rap and rock, or more recent, popular acts within the genre, but to incorporate elements of more diverse influences. Cage describes the album's title track as being similar to Nine Inch Nails because guitarist Sean Martin had been listening to the band heavily during the production of the album.

== Release ==
The first music video from the album, "I Never Knew You", debuted on May 18, 2009. Directed by Shia LaBeouf, the video features actor Dan Byrd following a woman played by Scarlett Kapella. The video was shot on location in downtown Los Angeles on February 21 and 22, and featured cameos from LaBeouf, Alex Pardee, El-P, Aesop Rock, Chauncey, F. Sean Martin, and Yak Ballz.

On the same day as the music video's release, Cage released the I Never Knew You EP as a digital download, initially for free, and then through digital stores. The EP featured four exclusive tracks, as well as "I Never Knew You", which would also be included on the album.

Depart from Me was initially announced as being scheduled for a June 29 release, but was delayed. The album was released as a digital download, and in deluxe editions on CD and vinyl.

== Critical reception ==
Professional ratings
Aggregate scores
Source	Rating
Metacritic	69/100
Review scores
Source	Rating
AllMusic	3/5 stars
The A.V. Club	B+
Robert Christgau	(1-star Honorable Mention)
Electronic Musician	4/5
HipHopDX	2.5/5
Now	3/5
Pitchfork	4.7/10
PopMatters	5/10 stars
URB	4/5 stars
XLR8R	7.5/10

At Metacritic, which assigns a weighted average score out of 100 to reviews from mainstream critics, the album received an average score of 69 based on 10 reviews, indicating "generally favorable reviews".

Thomas Golianopoulos of Spin called it "the most seamless, compelling union of hip-hop and modern rock since the two genres first collided."

== Track listing ==
No.	Title	Producer(s)	Length
1.	"Nothing Left to Say"	El-P	4:28
2.	"Beat Kids"	Sean "F. Sean" Martin	3:32
3.	"Dr. Strong"	Sean "F. Sean" Martin	3:19
4.	"I Found My Mind in Connecticut"	Sean "F. Sean" Martin	4:20
5.	"I Lost It in Havertown"	El-P	1:36
6.	"Teenage Hands"	Cage, El-P	1:47
7.	"Eating Its Way Out of Me"	El-P	3:57
8.	"Kick Rocks"	Sean "F. Sean" Martin	2:09
9.	"Captain Bumout"	Sean "F. Sean" Martin	2:55
10.	"Strain"	Aesop Rock	3:39
11.	"Fat Kids Need an Anthem"	Sean "F. Sean" Martin	2:19
12.	"Look at What You Did"	Sean "F. Sean" Martin	3:03
13.	"Depart from Me..."	Sean "F. Sean" Martin	4:49
14.	"I Never Knew You"	Sean "F. Sean" Martin	4:17

iTunes edition bonus track
No.	Title	Producer(s)	Length
15.	"Hugs and Kisses"	Sean "F. Sean" Martin	2:10

Deluxe edition bonus track
No.	Title	Producer(s)	Length
15.	"Worm in Her Vein"	Sean "F. Sean" Martin	3:25

== Personnel ==
Credits adapted from liner notes.

- Cage – vocals, production (6)
- Sean "F. Sean" Martin – guitar (1, 6), production (2, 3, 4, 8, 9, 11, 12, 13, 14)
- El-P – production (1, 5, 6, 7)
- Red Bank Kids Choir – vocals (2)
- Tero Smith – drum programming (3)
- Phil Caivano – guitar (9), recording
- Allyson Baker – guitar (10)
- Aesop Rock – production (10)
- Joey Raia – mixing (1, 2, 3, 4, 5, 6, 7, 8, 10, 11, 12)
- Dave Ogilvie – mixing (9, 13, 14)
- Michael Sarsfield – mastering
- Alex Pardee – artwork, design

== Charts ==
Chart	Peak position
US Billboard 200	133
US Heatseekers Albums (Billboard)	2
US Independent Albums (Billboard)	20
US Top R&B/Hip-Hop Albums (Billboard)	58
