= Leak Bros =

American hip-hop duo

- Origin: New York, United States
- Genres: Hip-hop; Alternative hip-hop
- Years active: 2003-2005
- Label: Eastern Conference Records
- Past members: Cage; Tame One

Leak Bros was an American hip-hop duo consisting of New York rapper Cage and New Jersey rapper Tame One.

== History ==
Tame One and Cage met through Robert "Kell's Bells" Kelly on the now-defunct Eastern Conference Records. Their relationship grew from both being natural fans of each other's work and a desire to collaborate. After Tame One met Cage, the two rappers eventually founded another collective, The Weathermen, along with El-P, Breeze Brewin, and Aesop Rock, among others. Leak Bros made their debut on Cage's Weatherproof EP and Tame One's When Rappers Attack, both released in 2003. As a whole, their songs involve the use of and effects of the drug PCP, hence their name "Leak Brothers". In 2004, the duo released the album Waterworld on Eastern Conference Records. While since then they have not released any more Leak Bros albums, Tame One has said that he and Cage have remained friends. Tame One died on November 5, 2022.

== Discography ==
=== Albums ===
- Waterworld (2004)

=== Singles ===
- "Got Wet" b/w "G.O.D' (2004)
