= King of Hearts (Camu Tao album) =

Studio album by Camu Tao
- Released: August 17, 2010
- Genre: Hip hop, electronic
- Length: 42:17
- Label: Fat Possum Records, Definitive Jux
- Producer: Camu Tao

Camu Tao chronology
Blair Cosby II: The Wali Era (2005)	King of Hearts (2010)

Professional ratings
Aggregate scores
Source	Rating
Metacritic	71/100
Review scores
Source	Rating
AllMusic	3.5/5 stars
The Phoenix	3/4 stars
PopMatters	6/10 stars
Potholes in My Blog	4/5 stars
Spectrum Culture	4.0/5.0
URB	3.5/5 stars

King of Hearts is the only studio album by American rapper and producer Camu Tao, who died of lung cancer in 2008. It was released posthumously via Fat Possum Records and Definitive Jux on August 17, 2010.

== Critical reception ==
At Metacritic, which assigns a weighted average score out of 100 to reviews from mainstream critics, King of Hearts received an average score of 71% based on 6 reviews, indicating "generally favorable reviews".

Josh Langhoff of PopMatters gave the album 6 stars out of 10, describing it as "the sound of Camu [Tao] reaching out, trying to connect with people while grappling with the most personal elements of his life."

Camu Tao’s friend and fellow rapper Cage, began a close working relationship in 2010 with another Ohio native Kid Cudi. During that time he showed Cudi the demos for the posthumous Tao album, with Cage telling El-P (a mutual friend of Cage and Tao) that Cudi was “super into the record and really into Camu and felt really connected to the music.” El-P and Cage asked Cudi if he would give them a quote for the record:

"These songs are so before their time it’s ridiculous. The melodies and harmonies are very clever, the lyrics are quick witted and his vocal arrangements are genius. People need to hear this shit and know this man’s story. Camu was a great future Ohio talent who I’m sure would have made a huge mark in this mediocre industry." – Kid Cudi

== Track listing ==
All tracks written and produced by Camu Tao.

No.	Title	Length
1.	"Be a Big Girl"	2:33
2.	"Bird Flu"	3:39
3.	"Death"	2:27
4.	"Fonny Valentine"	2:19
5.	"Actin' a Ass"	0:33
6.	"Get at You"	3:07
7.	"Ind of the World"	2:28
8.	"Intervention"	1:10
9.	"King of Hearts"	2:15
10.	"Major Team"	3:29
11.	"Plot a Little"	2:58
12.	"The Moment"	2:31
13.	"The Perfect Plan"	2:25
14.	"Play O Run"	2:08
15.	"When You're Going Down"	4:17
16.	"Kill Me"	3:58

== Charts ==
Chart	Peak position
US Dance/Electronic Albums (Billboard)	23
