= I Never Knew You =

EP by Cage
- Released: May 18, 2009
- Genre: Hip-hop
- Length: 16:23
- Label: Adult Swim/Definitive Jux
- Producer: Aesop Rock, Camu Tao, El-P, Sean "F. Sean" Martin

Cage chronology
Weatherproof (2003)	I Never Knew You (2009)

I Never Knew You is the second extended play by American rapper Cage. Released by Adult Swim and Definitive Jux, the EP was released to promote Cage's album Depart from Me and the first music video from that album, "I Never Knew You", and contained four exclusive tracks. The title track, "I Never Knew You", appeared on the album Depart from Me.

I Never Knew You was initially released as a free digital download, but has since been released through digital stores.

== Release ==
The EP was released in conjunction with the release of a music video for "I Never Knew You" directed by Shia LaBeouf. The video features actor Dan Byrd following a woman played by Scarlett Kapella. The video was shot on location in downtown Los Angeles on February 21 and 22, and featured cameos from LaBeouf, Alex Pardee, and Definitive Jux artists such as El-P, Aesop Rock, Chauncey, F. Sean Martin and Yak Ballz.

== Track listing ==
No.	Title	Producer(s)	Length
1.	"I Never Knew You"	Sean "F. Sean" Martin	4:17
2.	"Follow the Bleeder"	Camu Tao, Sean "F. Sean" Martin	2:24
3.	"Tongue in a Sharks Mouth (Note: Tracks 3 and 4 are mislabeled on all digital releases, swapping the names of "Tongue in a Sharks Mouth" (mislabeled as track 4) and "Hell Oh" (mislabeled as track 3))"	El-P	3:24
4.	"Hell Oh"	Sean "F. Sean" Martin	2:59
5.	"It's The 80's Again"	Sean "F. Sean" Martin	3:05
