= Weatherproof =

EP by Cage
- Released: July 29, 2003
- Genre: Hip-hop
- Length: 28:10
- Label: Eastern Conference; ECR1002
- Producer: Cage; Camu Tao; DJ Emz; DJ Mighty Mi; DJ Sebb; J-Zone; Reef; RJD2

Cage chronology
Nighthawks (2002)	Weatherproof (2003)	Waterworld (2004)

Professional ratings
Review scores
Source	Rating
HipHopDX	7/10
RapReviews	mixed

Weatherproof is the first extended play by American rapper Cage. It was released on July 29, 2003 via Eastern Conference Records. Production was handled by DJ Mighty Mi and Cage, who also served as executive producers, as well as Camu Tao, DJ Emz, DJ Sebb, J-Zone, RJD2 and Rob "Reef" Tewlow. It features guest appearances from Camu Tao and Tame One.

== Track listing ==
No.	Title	Writer(s)	Producer	Length
1.	"Intro"		Cage; DJ Mighty Mi	1:06
2.	"Summer in Hell"	Chris Palko; Milo Berger	DJ Mighty Mi	1:39
3.	"Leak Bros." (featuring Tame One)	Palko; Rahem Ross Brown; Rob Tewlow	Reef	4:21
4.	"Come to Daddy" (featuring Camu Tao)	Palko; Tero Smith	Camu Tao	4:04
5.	"Underground Rapstar"	Palko; Michael Greene	DJ Emz	3:12
6.	"Haterama"	Palko; Sébastien Vuignier	DJ Sebb	3:39
7.	"Weather People"	Palko; Ramble Krohn	RJD2	4:25
8.	"Fresh Out the Morgue"	Palko; Berger	DJ Mighty Mi	2:04
9.	"Too Much (Remix)"	Palko; Jay Mumford	J-Zone	3:36
Total length:				28:10
