= Kill the Architect =

Studio album by Cage
- Released: October 22, 2013
- Genre: Hip-hop
- Length: 42:25
- Label: Eastern Conference; KGMG
- Producer: DJ Mighty Mi; Slugworth; Mr. Bomb Camp; Aaron Perez

Cage chronology
Depart from Me (2009)	Kill the Architect (2013)

Professional ratings
Review scores
Source	Rating
Potholes in My Blog	2/5 stars

Kill the Architect is the fourth solo studio album by American rapper Cage. It was released by Eastern Conference Records and KGMG on October 22, 2013. It peaked at number 46 on the Billboard Top R&B/Hip-Hop Albums chart.

== Track listing ==
No.	Title	Producer(s)	Length
1.	"Lamb of Nothing"	DJ Mighty Mi, Slugworth	2:58
2.	"Fuck This Game"	Mr. Bomb Camp	3:50
3.	"Precipiss"	DJ Mighty Mi, Slugworth	2:54
4.	"The Hunt"	DJ Mighty Mi, Slugworth, Aaron Perez	3:12
5.	"In Your Fur"	DJ Mighty Mi, Slugworth	2:33
6.	"You Were the Shit (In High School)"	Mr. Bomb Camp	4:11
7.	"Watch Me"	DJ Mighty Mi, Slugworth	3:06
8.	"Cursed"	DJ Mighty Mi, Slugworth	3:12
9.	"They Suck"	DJ Mighty Mi, Slugworth	2:17
10.	"This Place"	DJ Mighty Mi, Slugworth	3:24
11.	"Road Kill"	DJ Mighty Mi, Slugworth	2:29
12.	"My Dog Is Dead"	DJ Mighty Mi, Slugworth	3:04
13.	"I Don't Know You"	DJ Mighty Mi, Slugworth	3:27

iTunes edition bonus tracks
No.	Title	Length
14.	"."	1:49
15.	"Merry Mythras"	2:27
16.	"Wildlife Awaits"	3:24
17.	"Fuck This Game (Mighty Mi & Slugworth Remix)"	4:05

== Personnel ==
Credits adapted from liner notes.

- Cage – vocals
- DJ Mighty Mi – production (1, 3, 4, 5, 7, 8, 9, 10, 11, 12, 13)
- Slugworth – production (1, 3, 4, 5, 7, 8, 9, 10, 11, 12, 13)
- Mr. Bomb Camp – production (2, 6)
- Aaron Perez – production (4)

== Charts ==
Chart	Peak position
US Top R&B/Hip-Hop Albums (Billboard)	46
