= Beetlejuice (entertainer) =

American actor (born 1968)

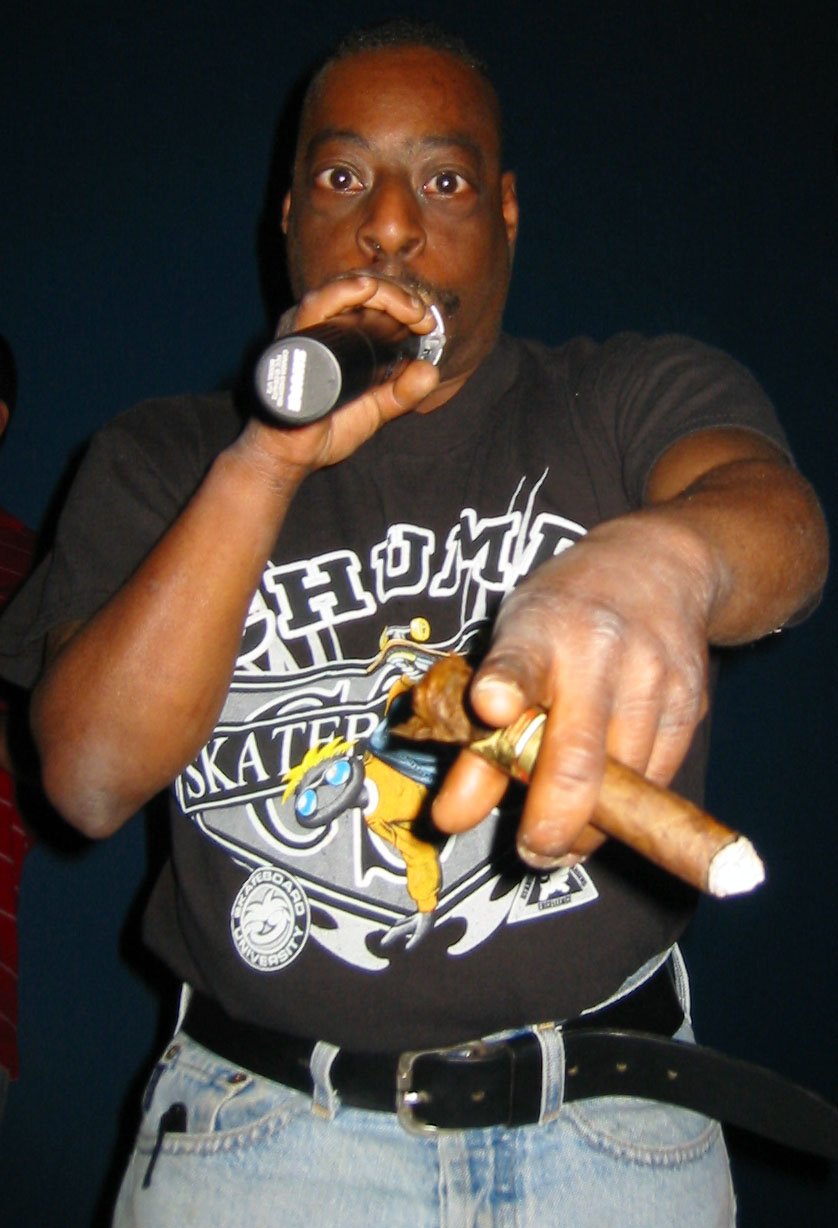
- Beetlejuice in 2004 during The Killers of Comedy Tour
- Born: Lester Green; June 2, 1968 (age 58); Browns Mills, New Jersey, U.S.
- Occupations: Comedian; actor
- Years active: 1999–present
- Height: 4 ft 3 in (130 cm)
- Website: beetlemerch.com

Lester Green (born June 2, 1968), known professionally as Beetlejuice, is an American comedian and actor. Green rose to prominence in 1999 due to his appearances on The Howard Stern Show, becoming a member of Stern's Wack Pack. He was named the greatest Wack Packer of all time in 2015. He has also appeared in such feature films as Bubble Boy (2001) and Scary Movie 2 (2001).

== Early life ==
Lester Green was born in Browns Mills, New Jersey, on June 2, 1968. Green was born with dwarfism and microcephaly, a condition that caused his small head relative to his small body and an intellectual disability. He is the second youngest of six children by his mother Lillie and was raised in the Marion Section of Jersey City.

== Career ==
Green was discovered in a neighborhood bar by Sean Rooney who became his manager. He would go on to become an entertainer and joined Rooney's dwarf-tossing company where he was given his nickname because of his resemblance to a character in the movie Beetlejuice (1988). Sean Rooney died in 2009 and management of Green's career fell to his brother, Bobby Rooney.

=== 1999–2000: Early appearances and The Howard Stern Show ===
Green made his debut on The Howard Stern Show on July 14, 1999, making an appearance with Frank "Third Degree" Burns, who also has dwarfism, while Rooney was promoting his dwarf-tossing business. Stern immediately took a liking to Beetlejuice and saw his potential for stardom, calling him a "once in a lifetime guest". Green would go on to make numerous appearances on the show and became one of Stern's most popular guests. Despite his popularity, some have been more critical of his appearances on the show due to the belief that Stern exploits developmentally disabled individuals.

In 2000, Stern was invited to the 17th AVN Awards to receive an honorary exclusive achievement award which he sent Green to receive for him. Green gave the acceptance speech with some direction from his manager that had to be stopped due to his lengthy, "incomprehensible rambling". That same year he made an appearance on WCW Monday Nitro where, dressed as Superman, he confronted Jeff Jarrett backstage, who then proceeded to hit Green over the head with a guitar after calling Jarrett "Slap Nuts". Green then interrupted Jarrett's WCW Championship match before being pummeled by the wrestler in the ring.

=== 2001–2016: Rise to fame ===
Green portrayed a fictional character in the 2001 cult comedy film Bubble Boy named Lil' Zip, a member of a freak show that Jake Gyllenhaal's character Jimmy Livingston meets. Another member of Stern's Wack Pack, Matthew McGrory, also appeared alongside Green. That same year he would make a cameo appearance as himself in Scary Movie 2, depicted as the brain of Marlon Wayans' stoner character Shorty Meeks.

In 2002, he appeared in rapper N.O.R.E.'s music video for the song "Grimey" and was featured on three songs on the dirty rap supergroup Smut Peddlers' debut studio album, Porn Again (2001), on the tracks "Beetlejuice Intro", "Pimpology by Beetlejuice", and "Beetlejuice Outtakes" on Rawkus Records.

Green sang "This Is Beetle", also known as "The Beetlejuice Song", on The Howard Stern Show in late 2004. Stern Show producer Richard Christy recorded the song, wrote music to accompany Beetlejuice's raw vocals, and then engineered it into the full song. The key lyrics to the song are, "This is Beetle, he's bad as can, and he knows he's the best." The song, which Green created spontaneously in the recording studio, has been covered by the rock band Staind, who included the song on special editions of their fifth studio album Chapter V. On September 19, 2005, Blues Traveler played their version of "This Is Beetle" on The Howard Stern Show. Initially, Stern was unable to broadcast this recording on his Sirius Satellite Radio program because CBS Radio owned the copyright to all of Stern's shows from K-Rock. Stern and his production staff recreated many of the more popular segments from his days on K-Rock, but attempts to recreate "This Is Beetle" were unsuccessful. However, in May 2006, Stern, Sirius, and CBS reached an agreement to sell the rights for all his K-Rock broadcasts to Sirius, thus enabling Stern to play the song. There was also a controversy around the share of potential profits from the song, and Green's manager at the time, Sean Rooney, got into an argument with Gary Dell'Abate, the executive producer of The Howard Stern Show, regarding the percentage share of the profits between Green and Christy.

Throughout his career Green also participated in amateur boxing matches with other little people.

Green also lent his voice and likeness in the 2005 video game True Crime: New York City where he portrayed a mental patient.

In June 2008, film director Michael Bay intended for Green to cameo in Transformers: Revenge of the Fallen (2009), but Green reportedly was difficult to direct and so Bay opted not to have him appear. In 2009, Green was featured in his own five-episode reality television show entitled This Is Beetle on Howard TV.

=== Since 2017: Recent appearances ===
In February 2021, Green made his first appearance on The Howard Stern Show in over five years. He informed Stern that he relocated to Georgia with his mother, and also debuted a remixed version of his 2015 song "Beetle in the House", featuring Snoop Dogg, Sean Paul, and Big Freedia.

In February 2022, Green's manager launched an NFT on the Goldin's Auction platform, which allowed the winning bidder to receive a physical rookie card signed by Green as well as a video of Green telling his life story. It sold for $15,000 after 21 bids.

In 2023, a video clip of Green dubbed "Just Hanging Around" became a viral meme on TikTok and other video sharing sites.

== Filmography ==
=== Film ===
| Year | Title | Role |
|---|---|---|
| 2012 | Girls Gone Dead | Himself |
| 2004 | Beetle Uncensored | Himself |
| 2001 | Scary Movie 2 | Shorty's Brain/Himself |
| 2001 | Bubble Boy | Lil' Zip |

=== Television ===
| Year | Title | Role |
|---|---|---|
| 2009 | This is Beetle | Himself |
| 2003 | Doggy Fizzle Televizzle | Himself and Super Juice |
| 2001 | Son of the Beach | Himself |
| 2000 | WCW Monday Nitro | Himself |
| 1999–2005 | Howard Stern | Himself |

=== Video games ===
| Year | Title | Role |
|---|---|---|
| 2005 | True Crime: New York City | Zeke (voice) |
