= High Water (El-P album) =

Studio album by El-P featuring The Blue Series Continuum
- Released: March 9, 2004
- Genres: Electronic, jazz fusion
- Length: 44:06
- Label: Thirsty Ear
- Producer: El-P

El-P chronology
Fantastic Damage (2002)	High Water (2004)	Collecting the Kid (2004)

High Water is a collaborative studio album by El-P featuring The Blue Series Continuum. It was released through Thirsty Ear Recordings on March 9, 2004. It peaked at number 46 on the Billboard Independent Albums chart.

== Critical reception ==
Professional ratings
Aggregate scores
Source	Rating
Metacritic	71/100
Review scores
Source	Rating
AllMusic	4/5 stars
BBC	unfavorable
Dusted Magazine	unfavorable
JazzTimes	favorable
Pitchfork	7.2/10
PopMatters	favorable
The Village Voice	A−

High Water was met with generally positive reviews. At Metacritic, which assigns a weighted average score out of 100 to reviews from mainstream critics, the album received an average score of 71 based on 9 reviews.

Reviewing for The Village Voice in September 2004, Tom Hull said this album "shows more meat" than the previous two Blue Series Continuum albums, "probably because El-P carves what the band gives him rather than smothering it in sauce." Thom Jurek of AllMusic gave the album 4 stars out of 5, saying: "In sum, it's a moody and haunting record with a few highs, a few lows, and lots of shades of blue to make your way through." David Moore of Pitchfork gave the album a 7.2 out of 10, saying, "El-P's edits and subtle production work strengthens the ensemble's more indulgent moments." He added, "El-P sometimes seems reluctant to interfere with the ensemble's improvisation, which is a shame considering that the album's strongest tracks show him taking the reins from individual players." Meanwhile, Stefan Braidwood of PopMatters said, "El-P has now proven beyond all doubt that he merits a further word in his description, and that word is: genius."

== Track listing ==
No.	Title	Length
1.	"Please Stay (Yesterday)"	2:37
2.	"Sunrise Over Bklyn"	10:33
3.	"Get Your Hand Off My Shoulder, Pig"	6:34
4.	"Get Modal"	5:06
5.	"Intrigue in the House of India"	6:33
6.	"Something Is Wrong"	4:09
7.	"When the Moon Was Blue"	6:42
8.	"Please Leave (Yesterday)"	1:51

== Personnel ==
Credits adapted from liner notes.

- El-P – composition, production, arrangement, mixing
- Matthew Shipp – piano
- Daniel Carter – reeds, flute
- Steve Swell – trombone
- Roy Campbell – trumpet
- William Parker – double bass
- Guillermo E. Brown – drums
- Harry Keys – vocals (7)
- Tim Conklin – recording
- Scott Hull – mastering
- Cynthia Fetty – art direction, photography
- Loretta Wong – design, layout

== Charts ==
Chart	Peak position
US Independent Albums (Billboard)	46
