= Hell's Winter =

Studio album by Cage
- Released: September 20, 2005
- Genre: Emo rap; hip-hop
- Length: 55:08
- Label: Definitive Jux
- Producer: El-P; Blockhead; DJ Shadow; RJD2; Central Services; Pawl; Camu Tao

Cage chronology
Waterworld (2004)	Hell's Winter (2005)	Depart from Me (2009)

Singles from Hell's Winter
- 1. "Hell's Winter" Released: 2005; 2. "Scenester / Left It to Us" Released: 2005

Hell's Winter is the second solo studio album by American rapper Cage. It was released by Definitive Jux on September 20, 2005. It peaked at number 26 on the Billboard Heatseekers Albums chart, as well as number 36 on the Independent Albums chart.

== Critical reception ==
Professional ratings
Review scores
Source	Rating
AllHipHop	3.5/5
AllMusic	4/5 stars
Alternative Press	3/5
The A.V. Club	favorable
Exclaim!	favorable
HipHopDX	4.5/5
Pitchfork	8.3/10
Prefix	9.0/10
RapReviews.com	9.5/10
Stylus Magazine	B−

Tom Breihan of Pitchfork gave the album an 8.3 out of 10, calling it "a harrowing ride on which Cage describes his childhood in fractured blips of vivid images instead of broad, sweeping statements." Ross McGowan of Stylus Magazine gave the album a grade of B−, saying, "Hell's Winter has its moments, but while the production is noteworthy, the actual songs within are rather hit or miss."

Exclaim! named it the 9th best hip-hop album of 2005. In 2010, Rhapsody included it on the "10 Best Albums by White Rappers" list.

== Track listing ==
No.	Title	Producer(s)	Length
1.	"Good Morning"	El-P	3:48
2.	"Too Heavy for Cherubs"	Blockhead, El-P	3:36
3.	"Grand Ol' Party Crash" (featuring Jello Biafra)	DJ Shadow	5:01
4.	"The Death of Chris Palko" (featuring Camu Tao)	Central Services	3:23
5.	"Stripes"	Blockhead, El-P	4:48
6.	"Shoot Frank" (featuring Daryl Palumbo)	RJD2	4:22
7.	"Scenester"	Blockhead	3:50
8.	"Perfect World"	Central Services	3:40
9.	"Subtle Art of the Breakup Song"	El-P	3:07
10.	"Peeranoia"	Pawl	3:39
11.	"Left It to Us" (featuring El-P, Aesop Rock, Tame One, and Yak Ballz)	Camu Tao	3:30
12.	"Public Property"	Camu Tao	3:52
13.	"Lord Have Mercy"	El-P	3:24
14.	"Hell's Winter"	El-P	5:09

== Personnel ==
Credits adapted from liner notes.

- Cage – vocals
- El-P – vocals (11), production (1, 2, 4, 5, 8, 9, 13, 14)
- Matt Sweeney – guitar (1)
- James McNew – bass guitar (1, 5)
- Blockhead – production (2, 5, 7)
- Jello Biafra – vocals (3)
- DJ Shadow – production (3)
- Camu Tao – vocals (4), production (4, 8, 11, 12)
- Daryl Palumbo – vocals (6)
- RJD2 – production (6)
- Pawl – production (10)
- Aesop Rock – vocals (11)
- Tame One – vocals (11)
- Yak Ballz – vocals (11)
- Nasa – recording
- Joey Raia – mixing
- Ken Heitmueller – mastering
- Kiku – artwork, design
- Nairobi Morgan – photography

== Charts ==
Chart	Peak position
US Heatseekers Albums (Billboard)	26
US Independent Albums (Billboard)	36
