= Collecting the Kid =

Compilation album by El-P
- Released: October 19, 2004
- Genre: Hip-hop
- Length: 49:20
- Label: Definitive Jux
- Producer: El-P

El-P chronology
High Water (2004)	Collecting the Kid (2004)	I'll Sleep When You're Dead (2007)

Professional ratings
Review scores
Source	Rating
AllMusic	3.5/5 stars
CMJ New Music Monthly	favorable
Exclaim!	favorable
Pitchfork	5.9/10
PopMatters	5/10 stars
XLR8R	mixed

Collecting the Kid is a compilation album by El-P. It was released through Definitive Jux on October 19, 2004.

The album is not intended as a direct follow-up to Fantastic Damage, but instead collects together various B-sides, instrumentals, film soundtracking work, and beats El-P has previously produced for other artists.

== Critical reception ==
David Moore of Pitchfork gave the album a 5.9 out of 10, saying, "most of Collecting the Kid shows one of underground hip-hop's most consistently rewarding producers in a frustrating holding pattern." Justin Cober-Lake of PopMatters gave the album 5 stars out of 10, saying: "It largely sounds like the studio tomfoolery that much of it is, but there's enough spark in even that to keep anticipation up for El-P's next real work."

== Track listing ==
No.	Title	Length
1.	"Dream Theme"	2:13
2.	"Jukie Skate Rock" (featuring Central Services)	4:30
3.	"Leaving This Place"	3:48
4.	"Feel Like a Ghost"	4:08
5.	"Intrigue in the House of India"	6:27
6.	"Telemundo (Bombing Theme)"	5:32
7.	"Slow Sex"	3:52
8.	"Constellation" (featuring Stephanie Vezina)	4:49
9.	"The Dance"	4:27
10.	"The Day After Yesterday"	3:53
11.	"Oxycontin" (featuring Central Services)	5:36
