= Porn Again =

Studio album by Smut Peddlers
- Released: February 13, 2001
- Studio: The Muthafuckin Spot On Lexington
- Genres: Dirty rap, hardcore hip hop, boom bap, East Coast hip hop, turntablism
- Length: 52:18
- Label: Rawkus
- Producer: DJ Mighty Mi

The High & Mighty chronology
Home Field Advantage (1999)	Porn Again (2001)	Air Force 1 (2002)

Cage chronology
Porn Again (2001)	Movies for the Blind (2002)

Singles from Porn Again
- 1. "One by One / The Hole Repertoire" Released: 1998; 2. "First Name Smut" Released: November 22, 1999; 3. "That Smut, Pt. 2" Released: July 17, 2001; 4. "Talk Like Sex, Pt. 2" Released: September 21, 2001

Professional ratings
Review scores
Source	Rating
AllMusic	3/5 stars
HipHopDX	3/5
RapReviews	8.5/10
The Source	3/5 stars
Village Voice	(dud)
XXL	L (3/5)

Porn Again is a collaborative studio album by American rappers Mr. Eon and Cage and record producer DJ Mighty Mi, recording as a supergroup Smut Peddlers. It was released on February 13, 2001, via Rawkus/Priority Records. Recording sessions took place at The Muthafuckin' Spot On Lexington. Production was handled by member DJ Mighty Mi, who also served as executive producer together with his The High & Mighty partner Mr. Eon. It features guest appearances from Copywrite, Kool G Rap, Kool Keith, R.A. the Rugged Man, Apani B. Fly, Lord Sear and Beetlejuice. The album peaked at number 184 on the Billboard 200, number 43 on the Top R&B/Hip-Hop Albums and number 10 in the Heatseekers Albums in the United States. It was re-released as Porn Again Revisited on March 7, 2006, via Eastern Conference Records, with four bonus tracks that were formerly only available on vinyl.

The album cover features Lester "Beetlejuice" Green, an entertainer most notable for his appearances on The Howard Stern Show. This was a decision made by Rawkus Records.

== Track listing ==
Porn Again (RWK 1199, P 50164)
No.	Title	Writer(s)	Length
1.	"Beetlejuice Intro" (featuring Beetlejuice)	Milo Berger; Lester Green	0:31
2.	"Smut Council"	Berger; Eric Meltzer; Chris Palko	2:04
3.	"Medicated Minutes"	Berger; Meltzer; Palko	4:41
4.	"Talk Like Sex Pt. II" (featuring Kool G Rap)	Berger; Meltzer; Palko; Nathaniel Wilson	3:38
5.	"Amazing Feats"	Berger; Meltzer; Palko	3:48
6.	"Pimpology By Beetlejuice" (featuring Beetlejuice)	Berger; Meltzer	0:42
7.	"That Smut"	Berger; Meltzer; Palko	3:43
8.	"Anti Hero's" (featuring Copywrite)	Berger; Meltzer; Palko; Peter Nelson	4:00
9.	"54"	Berger; Palko	3:19
10.	"Josie" (featuring Apani B. Fly and Lord Sear)	Berger; Meltzer; Palko	4:06
11.	"Beats, Boxes, and Boobtube" (featuring Lord Sear)		4:44
12.	"Diseases"	Berger; Meltzer	1:06
13.	"One By One (Revamped)"	Berger; Meltzer; Palko	3:54
14.	"Stank MCs" (featuring Kool Keith)	Berger; Meltzer; Palko; Keith Thornton	4:04
15.	"My Rhyme Ain't Done"	Berger; Meltzer; Palko	3:52
16.	"Bottom Feeders" (featuring R.A. the Rugged Man)	Berger; Meltzer; Palko; R.A. Thorburn	3:28
17.	"Beetlejuice Outakes" (featuring Beetlejuice)	Berger; Green	0:38
Total length:			52:18

Porn Again (ECR 1020) re-release bonus tracks
No.	Title	Producer(s)	Length
18.	"Red Light"	Alchemist	4:02
19.	"Anti Hero's Remix"	DJ Mighty Mi	3:52
20.	"For the Record" (featuring Masai Bey)	DJ Mighty Mi	3:50
21.	"First Name Smut"	DJ Mighty Mi	3:35

== Personnel ==
- Eric "Mr. Eon" Meltzer – main artist, vocals, executive producer, sleeve notes
- Chris "Cage" Palko – main artist, vocals, sleeve notes
- Milo "DJ Mighty Mi" Berger – main artist, producer, recording, executive producer, sleeve notes
- Lester "Beetlejuice" Green – featured artist, vocals (tracks: 1, 6, 17)
- Nathaniel "Kool G Rap" Wilson – featured artist, vocals (track 4)
- Peter "Copywrite" Nelson – featured artist, vocals (track 8)
- Apani N. Smith – hook vocals (track 10)
- Steve "Lord Sear" Watson – voice (track 10), performer (track 11)
- Keith "Kool Keith" Thornton – featured artist, vocals (track 14)
- "R.A. the Rugged Man" Thorburn – featured artist, vocals (track 16)
- Vere Isaacs – bass
- DJ Kid Swift – scratches (tracks: 2, 9)
- Evan "DJ EV" Hitch – scratches (track 4)
- Kim "DJ Noize" Sæther – scratches (tracks: 5, 16)
- DJ Daze – scratches (track 13)
- Rob "Reef" Tewlow – additional instrumentation
- Chris Conway – mixing (tracks: 1–3, 5–7, 9–13, 15–17)
- Steve Sola – mixing (tracks: 4, 8, 14)
- Franck Khalfoun – photography
- Mike Scapaletti – photography
- Rahav Segev – photography
- Chad Hogan – artwork
- Willo Perron – artwork
- Andrew Kelley – artwork
- Brian Life – illustration

== Charts ==
Chart (2001)	Peak position
US Billboard 200	184
US Top R&B/Hip-Hop Albums (Billboard)	43
US Heatseekers Albums (Billboard)	10

Singles chart positions

Year	Song	Chart position	
Year	Song	US R&B/Hip-Hop	US Rap
2000	"That Smut"	–	#9
2001	"That Smut"	#96	–
2001	"Talk Like Sex Pt. 2"	–	#43
