= Cage (rapper) =

American rapper

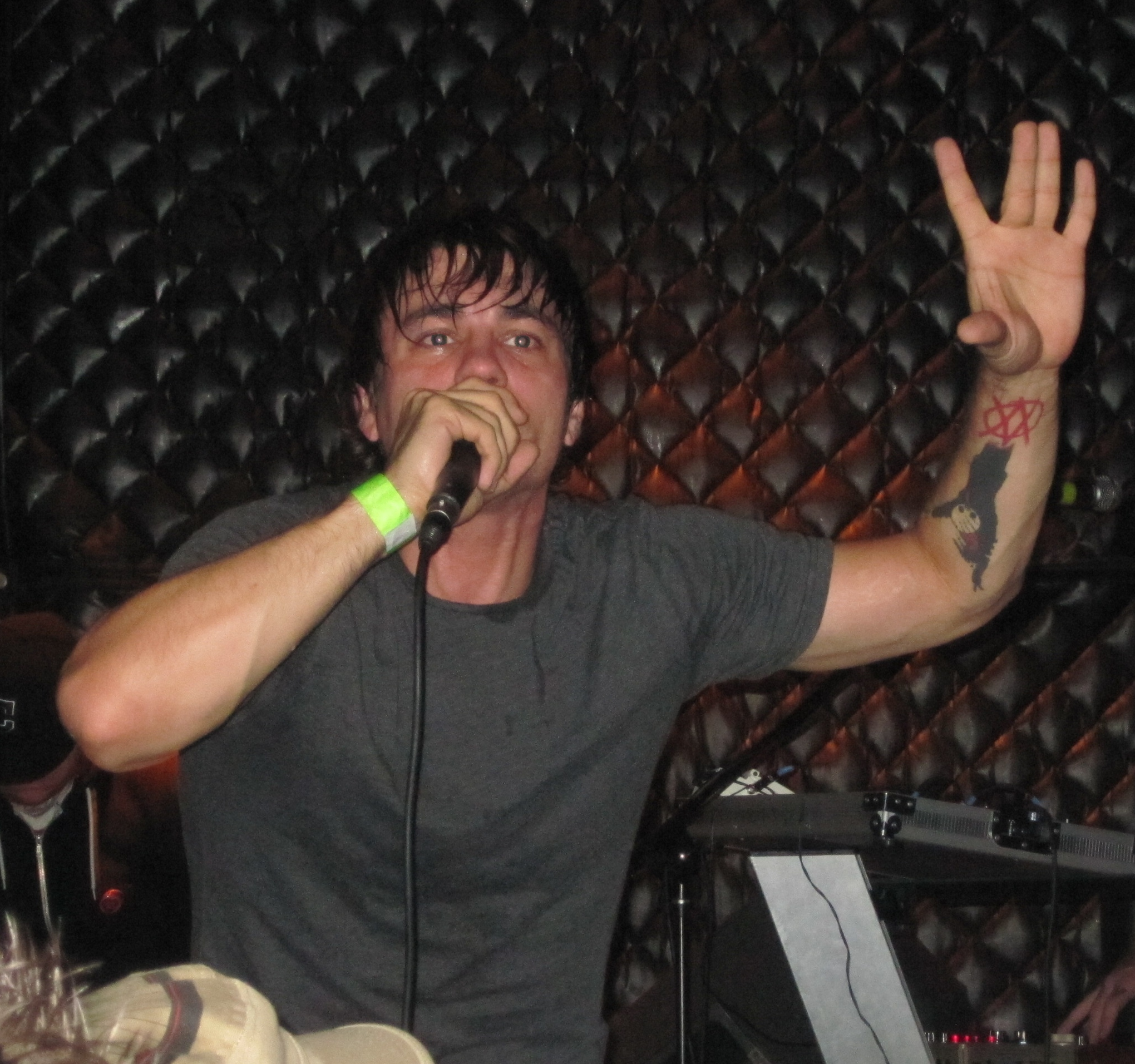
- Cage performing a live show at the Triple Rock Social Club, Minneapolis, in 2009

Background information
- Also known as: Alex; Cage Kennylz; Keige; Sam Hill
- Born: Christian Palko; May 4, 1973 (age 53); Würzburg, West Germany
- Origin: Middletown, New York, U.S.
- Genres: Horrorcore; hip-hop
- Occupations: Rapper; Songwriter
- Years active: 1991–present
- Labels: Columbia; Definitive Jux; Eastern Conference; Fondle 'Em; Tribute Recordings
- Formerly of: Bloody Ruffnecks/Mudbones; Leak Bros; Nighthawks; Smut Peddlers; The Weathermen
- Website: cagewm.com

Christian Palko (born May 4, 1973), better known by his stage name Cage, is an American rapper from Middletown, New York. With a majority of his career being spent with record labels Definitive Jux and Eastern Conference, he has released six solo albums, in addition to two compilation albums, three singles and three EPs.

Aside from his solo career, Cage is one of the founders of the underground hip-hop supergroup The Weathermen, which was formed in 1999. He also established a group called Smut Peddlers, with hip-hop duo The High & Mighty, publishing an album titled Porn Again, in 2001. He is also known for his collaborations with New Jersey rapper Tame One; the two were collectively known as Leak Bros. Cage and Camu Tao made up the duo Nighthawks, who released an eponymous 2002 album.

== Early life ==
Chris Palko was born in Würzburg, West Germany, to American parents. His father was stationed on a West German military base as a member of the military police. Palko lived there until the age of four when his father was dishonorably discharged for selling and using heroin, and the family was sent back to the United States, where they lived in Middletown, New York. His father would often force Palko to pull homemade tourniquets around his arm as he injected heroin. At the age of eight, Palko's father was arrested during a standoff with state troopers after threatening his family with a shotgun. By the time Palko was expelled from high school, his mother had remarried twice, and he was beaten by his stepfather Frank. Palko began using PCP, cocaine, LSD, cannabis and alcohol.

Palko was arrested several times for drug possession and fighting in the streets. Facing jail time for violating probation, his mother convinced the judge he was mentally unstable, and was sent to the Stony Lodge psychiatric hospital for a two-week evaluation. He stayed in the hospital for sixteen months, where he was a part of a small group used to test fluoxetine, commonly known as Prozac. After being misdiagnosed and placed on the drug, he became suicidal and made several attempts to kill himself, including hanging himself with his shoelaces and saving his lithium dose for a month before ingesting all of them at once.

== Career ==
=== 1991–2001: Career beginnings ===
When Palko was released from the hospital at eighteen, he pursued a career as a rapper, giving himself the stage name "Alex", after the protagonist of Anthony Burgess' novel A Clockwork Orange. After hiring a manager and recording a demo, he was introduced to rapper Pete Nice, and Cage debuted on the track "Rich, Bring 'Em Back" on the 1993 album Dust to Dust. Known as "Keige" and part of a group named Bloody Ruffnecks and later Mudbones, his first demo mixtape was released in 1994; in the liner notes, he named his influences as Kool Keith, Big Daddy Kane, Rakim, Juice Crew, Marley Marl and KRS-One.

Pete Nice also introduced Palko to radio personality Bobbito García, who featured Palko on his program several times, increasing his reputation among New York's underground hip-hop scene, where he became associated with KMD, Kurious Jorge, K-Solo, Godfather Don, Necro, Artifacts, Pharoahe Monch and El-P. He spent the last night with MF Doom's brother and KMD member Subroc in 1993 before he was killed in a road accident. Palko signed a recording contract with Columbia Records, but frequently recorded while intoxicated, and the label found his efforts to be unsatisfactory. Palko briefly put his career on hold and his drug use increased. He became a father to a daughter in 1994.

When García founded the label Fondle 'Em Records, he offered Palko a record deal, and Cage released a single featuring the songs "Radiohead" and "Agent Orange" in 1997, to success and acclaim. Following the release of Slim Shady EP in December 1997, Palko accused Detroit-based rapper Eminem of imitating his style. Eminem later sarcastically addressed the accusation through various songs, including "Drastic Measures (Microphone Autopsy),” "Role Model," and "Get You Mad."

After several more singles with Fondle 'Em, Palko met Mr. Eon and DJ Mighty Mi of The High & Mighty, and the trio formed the group Smut Peddlers, releasing the album Porn Again on Rawkus Records in 2001. The album peaked at #10 on the Billboard Heatseekers chart, #43 on the Top R&B/Hip-Hop Albums chart, and #184 on the Billboard 200, while its single "That Smut" peaked at #9 on the Hot Rap Singles chart and #96 on the Hot R&B/Hip-Hop Singles & Tracks chart. In 2001 and 2002 respectively, Palko's music was featured on the soundtrack to the psychological crime film Bully and season 1 of the crime drama television show The Wire.

=== 2002–2009: Eastern Conference and Definitive Jux era ===
Palko signed with The High & Mighty's Eastern Conference Records, releasing his debut album, Movies for the Blind, on August 6, 2002. It peaked at #12 on the Heatseekers chart, #14 on the Top Independent Albums chart, #58 on the Top R&B/Hip-Hop Albums chart, and #193 on the Billboard 200. Palko later stated, in 2006, that the album "sort of glorified drugs" and that he felt the album was "crazy for the sake of being crazy [...] . During this period, Palko formed the group The Weathermen, named after the left-wing political organization. The group released their debut album The Conspiracy on June 3, 2003, before Palko left Eastern Conference over alleged non-payment. An extended play, titled Weatherproof, was released on July 29, 2003. During his time on Eastern Conference, Interscope Records showed interest in signing Cage despite Eminem also being on their label, but ended their interest after judging that he would not attract a mainstream audience.

Because Palko felt that he should no longer play a character, he began to take on a more open writing style, and signed with Definitive Jux, where he released his second studio album Hell's Winter, on September 20, 2005. Hell's Winter peaked at #26 on the Top Heatseekers chart and at #36 on the Top Independent Albums chart.

In a 2007 interview with actor Shia LaBeouf, for Vanity Fair, he expressed an interest in starring as Palko in a film biography. On November 30, 2007, Spin reported that the film would go into production. As of today, no such film has been made.

In July 2009, Palko released his third studio album Depart from Me, which he characterized as having a rap rock sound. LaBeouf directed the music video for the song "I Never Knew You". Cage's mental health was affected by the suffering and death of best friend and collaborator Camu Tao during the recording process.

=== 2010–present: Kill the Architect and later work ===
In late 2010, Palko appeared on American recording artist Kid Cudi's second album Man On The Moon II: The Legend of Mr. Rager, making a guest appearance on a track titled "Maniac". The two performed "Maniac", alongside indie rock musician St. Vincent, on Late Night with Jimmy Fallon in November of that year. In March 2011, Cudi announced he would be releasing a short film inspired by the song "Maniac", co-starring Palko and directed by Shia LaBeouf, in October 2011. On October 30, 2011, as promised Cudi released Maniac, a short horror film, premiered via his blog.

Despite previously having a falling out with The High & Mighty, Palko announced in 2012, he would reunite with producer DJ Mighty Mi, to release a single titled "The Void", which was released on April 3, 2012, on Tribute Records. Palko also started a new project with Sean Martin, called We Sold Our Souls, who released their first song "Super Baked" in March 2012. Cage also announced he would release material under an alter ego, Sam Hill, with lyrics on topics similar to his early efforts on Movies For the Blind. On August 23, 2013, it was announced that the album Kill the Architect would be released on October 22, 2013, with Eastern Conference. A song from the album, "The Hunt", was released on the same day.

Palko had two further supporting roles in independent films: Justin Benson and Aaron Moorhead's critically acclaimed romantic horror Spring and Amber Tamblyn's drama Paint It Black.

== Style ==
Described by Okayplayer as "One of horrorcore's most polarizing figures", Cage frequently rapped about his traumatic childhood including parental abuse and his year-long spell at the Stoney Lodge mental hospital, calling the latter experience a college education for his rap career. He abandoned this style between Movies for the Blind and Hell's Winter, making a choice to not make misogynistic music, music promoting drug use, or battle rap. Cage used influences from rock music on 2009's Depart from Me, calling it "progressive rap". Cage was also called "the poster boy for emo rap" by Exclaim!, with Hell's Winter and the song "I Never Knew You" cited as examples of him performing in this style.

== Discography ==
=== Studio albums ===
- Movies for the Blind (2002)
- Hell's Winter (2005)
- Depart from Me (2009)
- Kill the Architect (2013)
- Book ov Sam: Infernal Depths (2018) (as Sam Hill)
- Death Miracles (2020)

=== EPs ===
- Weatherproof (2003)
- I Never Knew You (2009)

=== Collaborative albums ===
- Porn Again (2001) (with The High & Mighty, as Smut Peddlers)
- Nighthawks (2002) (with Camu Tao, as Nighthawks)
- Waterworld (2004) (with Tame One, as Leak Bros)

== Filmography ==
- Maniac (2011)
- Spring (2014)
- Paint It Black (2016)
