= Copywrite (rapper) =

American rapper (born 1978)

- Also known as: Cwrite, Copy, C, Copywrite 78, Peter Mirabella
- Born: Peter William Nelson; June 12, 1978 (age 48)
- Origin: Columbus, Ohio, US
- Genres: Hip hop
- Years active: 1998–current
- Labels: Amalgam Digital, Man Bites Dog Records, O.D.O.T, Eastern Conference, Nature Sounds, Rawkus

Peter William Nelson (born June 12, 1978), better known by his stage name Copywrite, is an underground rapper from Columbus, Ohio. He is a member of MHz Legacy (formerly known as MHz). He was a member of The Weathermen.

== Career ==
In 2002, Copywrite released his debut album, The High Exhaulted, on Eastern Conference. Production was handled by RJD2, Intalec, Mighty Mi, Camu Tao, and Copywrite himself. It was followed by Cruise Control Mixtape: Volume 1, which featured production from J-Zone, Jake One and Jay Dilla.

In 2010, Copywrite released his second album, entitled The Life and Times of Peter Nelson. The album featured guest appearances from Dilated Peoples, Sean Price, and Middle Distance Runner. It was produced by RJD2, Twiz the Beat Pro, and Surock, among others.

In 2012, Copywrite released his third album, God Save the King, on Man Bites Dog Records. It featured guest appearances from Mac Lethal, Roc Marciano, and Torae.

== Personal life ==
Copywrite is the grandson of the late singer Skip Nelson (born Scipione Mirabella) who most sang and played piano and guitar for the Glenn Miller Band in the 1940s.

== Discography ==
=== Studio albums ===
- The High Exhaulted (2002)
- The Life and Times of Peter Nelson (2010)
- God Save the King (2012)
- Murderland (2014) (with Surock)
- Blood, Bath & Beyond (2016)
- The High Exhaulted 2 (2022)
- The Last Supper (2024)

=== Collaborative albums ===
- Unfinished & Untitled with Planet Asia (2017)

=== Compilation albums ===
- The Rarities (2010)
- Caught on Audio Cassette: To Hell and Back (2011)

=== Mixtapes ===
- Cruise Control Mixtape: Volume 1 (2004)
- The Jerk: Volume 0 (2007)
- The Worst of the Best of Copywrite: Mixtape Vol. 1 (2007)
- Carbon Copy's Phony Art Pub Scam (2013)
- Cruise Control Vol. 2 (2019)

=== EPs ===
- Ultrasound: The Rebirth EP (2009)

=== Singles ===
- "Holier Than Thou" b/w "Tower of Babble" (2000)
- "Fire It Up" (2002)
- "10 Times" (2003)
- "Beautiful Trainwreck" b/w "Happy Hour" (2005)

=== Guest appearances ===
- Smut Peddlers - "Anti Hero's" from Porn Again (2001)
- Jakki tha Motamouth - "Widespread" from Farewell Fondle 'Em (2001)
- RJD2 - "June" from Deadringer (2002)
- J-Zone - "Prima Donna" from Sick of Bein' Rich (2003)
- Vakill - "Forbidden Scriptures" from The Darkest Cloud (2003)
- Form One - "Three Poisonous Darts" (2003)
- Soul Position - "Still Listening" from 8 Million Stories (2003)
- Molemen - "With Us" from Lost Sessions (2005)
- Cassius Henry - "It's A Gibberish Thing" (2005)
- Marco Polo - "Get Busy" from Port Authority (2007)
- Rocktight - "We Run This" from School of Rocktight (2007)
- Illmaculate - "Thorouhbred" from The Rain Check Mixtape (2007)
- King Magnetic - "The Five Piece" from Everything's A Gamble Volume One (2007)
- Ras Kass - "It's Like Dat.. (Feat. The Tu, Imperial, & Q-Dog)" (2007)
- Rhyme Asylum - "Attitude Problem" from State of Lunacy (2008)
- Vast Aire - "Gimme Dat Mic" from Dueces Wild (2008)
- Jakki tha Motamouth - "Supacats" and "We Run This" from Psycho Circus (2008)
- King Magnetic - "Patiently Waiting" from The Co-$ign (2008)
- Tone Spliff - "Funky 2 The Bone" and "Inside Out" from Authentic (2009)
- Randam Luck - "Celebrity Smackdown" from Graveyard Shift (2009)
- Surock - "Suicypher (Feat. Chino XL & Canibus)" (2009)
- Fabio Musta - "Italian Roots" from Passport (2009)
- Azma Instigater - "Pay Me To Spit" from Az Good Az New (2009)
- DJ JS-1 - "Sum Rap Shit" from Ground Original 2: No Sell Out (2009)
- Coolzey - "Retina Scan" from The Honey (2010)
- Jimmy Powers - "Shits & Giggles" from Cali-Foreigner (2010)
- Mini Thin - "How Many Bars (Feat. Mini Thin & Canibus) (2010)
- EQ - "Battle Me" from Out the Ashtray of L.A. (2010)
- Canibus - "Gold & Bronze Magik" from Melatonin Magik (2010)
- Likewize - "Fucked Up With A Gun" (Feat. RBX) from Kill Me First (2010)
- Prolific - "Big Business" (Raiden Remix) from Loyalty Amongst Thieves (2010)
- Killah Priest - "Fire Reign (Feat. Jakki Da Mota Mouth) from The 3 Day Theory (2010)
- Infinit P'Tenchul - "I.P. And Odot" from The Pleasure's All Ours (2010)
- NapsNdreds - "Do What I Should" from Blackboard Jungle (2010)
- Canibus - "The Cypher Of Agartha (Feat. Planet Asia)" from Lyrical Law (Disc 1) (2011)
- Dirtbag Dan - "Money" from The Dirtbag Dan Mixtape (2011)
- J. Rawls - "Are You Listening?" and "We're on Top" from The Hip-Hop Affect (2011)
- Tone Spliff - "Think About It" from Work Ethics (2011)
- Absoulut Karnage - "Greatest Of All Time" from The Anomaly (2011)
- Azma Instigater - "Output", "Can't Fly" and "Move" from Thought You Knew (2011)
- Amazing Maze - "Trapped In A Maze" from My Story Is Yours (2011)
- Ugly Tony - "Untouchables" from At Nightfall (2011)
- Revilo - "Unter Strom" from Unter Strom (2011)
- Terminal 3 - "Triple Seize- (Feat. Crooked I & Chino XL) from Terminal 3 Presents The Academy (2011)
- Mr. Brown - "We Don't Quit" (2011)
- Irealz - "Step 4 Step" from Solar Flarez (2012)
- The White Shadow - "Desolate Fate" from 666 (2012)
- Sound Survivors - "Cruel World, Pt.2 (Feat. Bronze Nazareth, Planet Asia, & Chino XL) (2012)
- Casual and J. Rawls - "Hier-O-Dot" from Respect Game or Expect Flames (2012)
- Ruste Juxx & The Arcitype - "The Life I Live" from V.I.C. (2012)
- Evil Intentions - "Microphone 2 Shreds" from Evil Intentions (2012)
- Conspiracy Theorists - "The Way, The Truth, The Life" from Conspiracy Theories (2012)
- Matt the Tax Collector - "All-Around" from The Son Even Shines on the Gritty (2013)
- Zeps - "Classical Beatdown" (2013)
- Playdough & Sean Patrick - "On And On" from Gold Tips (2014)
- Hafrican - "Underground Madness" from Underground Madness (2014)
- Cas Metah & Wonder Brown - "Drowning Man" from Mind the Rap Vol. 3 (2014)
- Illicit - "Sharper Edge" also featuring Stess The Emcee produced by Illmind (2014)
- Nomad Hip Hop - "Al Bundy" and "The Cleanup Crew" from Propaganda: How to Ruin Everything (2016)
- Tone Spliff - "Rap Time" from Pull No Punches (2016)
- Taiyamo Denku - "Check 32" from Plant The Seed (2017)
- Melvin Junko - "Keep It Grimey" from 10,000 Hours (2017)
- Big Daddy Rap Beast - "We Ain't About Shit" from Peep My Jawns (2018)
- Mr. Face - "Speedy Gonzales" from Trappy Face (2018)
- OthelloBT - "Buena Vista" from Hunger Bunger Mixtape (2018)
- Mohammad Escrow - "How Much Pain" from 'Mohammad Escrow (2019)
