= Eastern Conference Records =

Record label

Eastern Conference Records is an American independent record label based in New York City. It is owned and operated by DJ Mighty Mi, the DJ/producer for the High & Mighty.

During the label's brief heyday, it represented underground rappers such as Cage, Tame One (one-half of the duo The Artifacts), R.A. the Rugged Man, and The Weathermen, a supergroup created by Cage, MHz and Aesop Rock, Copywrite, Tame One, Breeze Brewin of the Juggaknots, El-P, Camu Tao, and Yak Ballz.

== History ==
=== Beginnings ===
Mr. Eon established the Eastern Conference imprint in 1996, in the midst of the late nineties indie boom of rap. During this epoch, which spanned from roughly 1996 to 2002, a renewed interest in vinyl records provided a niche market for many smaller record labels and fiercely independent rappers. In addition to Eastern Conference, Rawkus Records, Fondle 'Em Records, Solesides, and Stones Throw Records were established during this time period. The former two were based in New York alongside Eastern Conference, and the latter two in California.

Similar to both Fondle 'Em and Rawkus, Eastern Conference was initially a vinyl-only imprint. Critical response to the label's early output was positive, and the first Eastern Conference single, The High & Mighty's "It's All Good / Hands On Experience (feat. Bobbito the Barber & El-P) / Cranial Lumps" quickly reached cult status on the strength of "Hands On Experience", a whimsical ode to masturbation.

During its first three years of existence, Eastern Conference continued to release successful twelve-inch singles from the Smut Peddlers, Jurassic 5's Chali 2na, The High & Mighty, and Mad Skillz. The label's eye for new talent steadily built its reputation as an up-and-coming imprint in the contemporary rap scene.

In 1998, Eastern Conference released its first compilation, Eastern Conference All-Stars. This release was essentially a collection of the first eight or so vinyl singles, drawing comparisons to Rawkus Records' Soundbombing.

=== Peak and decline ===
In 1999, Eastern Conference Records began distributing through Rawkus Records, which had become an extremely successful label in its own right. This began what could arguably be called Eastern Conference's most successful period. During this time, two relatively successful albums were released: The High & Mighty's Home Field Advantage and the Smut Peddlers' Porn Again. Both cracked the Billboard Top 200 (the former at #193 and the latter at #184), and had strong supporting singles: "B-Boy Document '99 (featuring Mad Skillz & Mos Def)" and "That Smut", respectively. Amidst these successes, the label continued to release positively received twelve-inch singles, including Mad Skillz' "Ghostwriter" and Cage's "Suicidal Failure".

When Eastern Conference's two-year contract to Rawkus was up, Mighty Mi made the decision to sever ties with Rawkus and continue to "build independently", without releasing records under a major label. He soon found a distributor (Landspeed Records, who had released the first Eastern Conference All-Stars), and quickly began releasing material. The first release under Landspeed was, fittingly, Eastern Conference All Stars II, an all-new compilation featuring music from Jurassic 5, Big Daddy Kane, Reef the Lost Cauze, Tame One, and The Last Emperor.

During the next three years, however, Eastern Conference experienced a dramatic decline in interest and support from rap fans. One speculated reason for this is that since the label no longer enjoyed major label backing, as it had through Rawkus, it became harder to distribute their projects as widely and promote them as heavily. However, many hip-hop fans claim that Eastern Conference's output simply suffered from a lack of overall quality.

Additionally, the label was dealt a harsh blow when Cage, along with his group the Weathermen, the label's biggest selling act, moved to the Definitive Jux label. When asked about the move in a HipHopSite.com interview, Cage replied

"I hit a ceiling with E.C., period. That was it. I wasn't making money. The amount of money I made with them, I could have made myself. But then again, in doing it myself, how many more pieces would I have sold? I'd be kind of doing the same thing, just not splitting the money so many different ways. But it was about expansion, about growth. It's what artists do."

However, Cage later stated that another reason for his leaving the label was financial mismanagement and lack of proper marketing and promotion for his albums. Instead, he claimed that Mighty Mi (and, to an extent, Mr. Eon) were funneling the label's money into their own projects. Encouraged by Cage, other artists who had formerly recorded for EC and supported his claims of Mighty Mi's sloppy business dealings. This created a storm of bad publicity for Eastern Conference Records & Mighty Mi, and were nearly as damaging as Cage's departure itself. Shortly after, other Weathermen, Yak Ballz and Tame One followed Cage and moved to other labels.

Whether caused by the artists' claims or not, Eastern Conference's output was drastically reduced from 2005 onward; the label released four albums in 2005, one album in 2006, and by June 2007 had only released one album.

=== Current label status ===
The current status of Eastern Conference Records is somewhat of a mystery. The label's website, ECRecs.com, is no longer functional, and output has been extremely limited. By June 2007, the only source of information about upcoming Eastern Conference releases was through DJ Mighty Mi's MySpace page.

In 2013 the label released Cage's fourth studio album Kill the Architect.

== Artist roster ==
=== Current artists / groups (As of August 2013) ===
- The High & Mighty
- Sub-Conscious
- Cage

=== Former artists / groups ===
- Ill-Advised / Baby Blak
- Mad Skillz
- Smut Peddlers
- The Weathermen
- Nighthawks
- Leak Bros
- Camu Tao
- R.A. the Rugged Man
- Chief Kamachi & The JuJu Mob
- Reef the Lost Cauze
- Copywrite
- Yak Ballz
- Tame One

== See also ==
- List of record labels
