= Tame One =

American rapper (1970–2022)

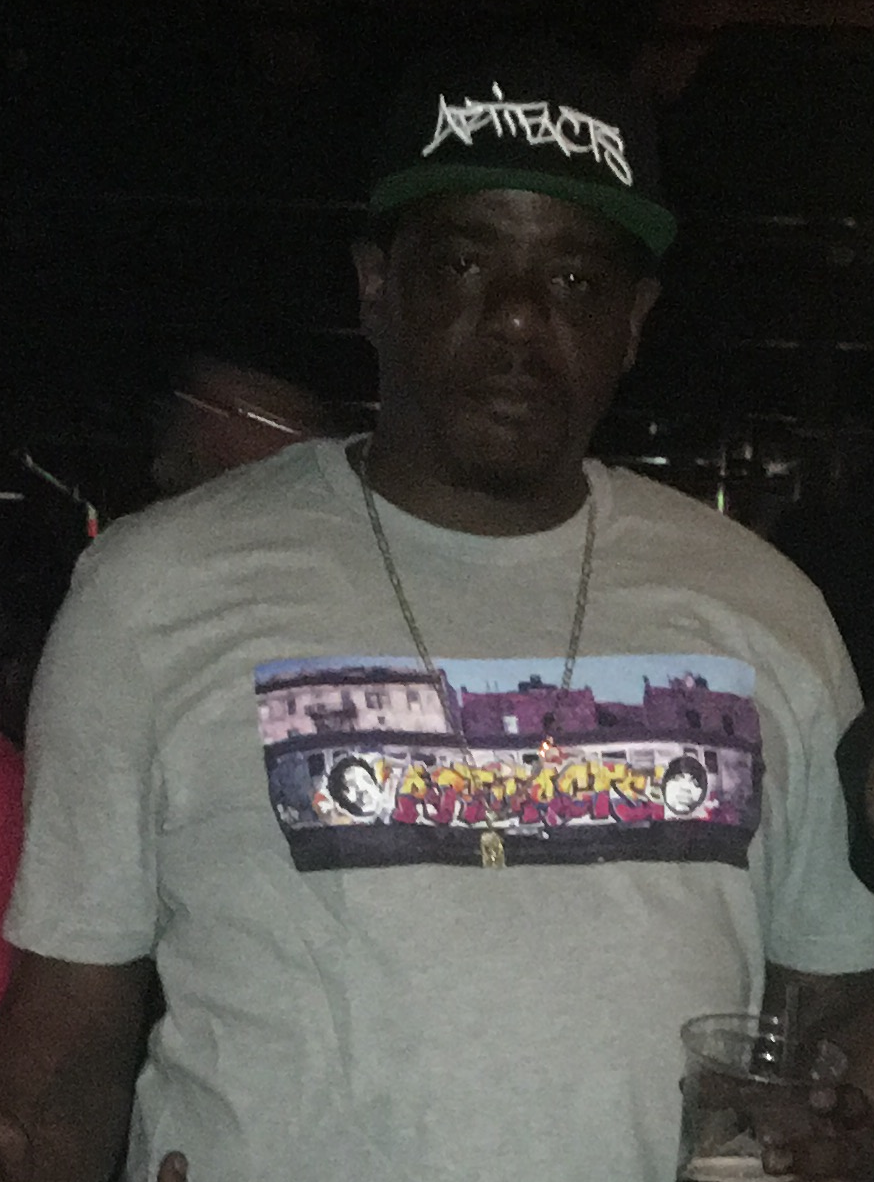
- Tame One in 2019

Background information
- Also known as: Tame 1, Tamer Dizzle, Cheech Wizard
- Born: Rahem Ross Brown; March 20, 1970; Newark, New Jersey, U.S.
- Died: November 6, 2022 (aged 52)
- Genre: Hip-Hop
- Occupation: Rapper
- Years active: 1988–2022
- Labels: Big Beat/Atlantic Records; Eastern Conference Records; Fat Beats; FloSpot Records; Amalgam Digital; Parallel Thought; Division East Records; Empire Records
- Website: Www.TAME-ONE.NET

Rahem Ross Brown (March 20, 1970 – November 6, 2022), better known by his stage name Tame One, was an American hip hop recording artist and graffiti artist from New Jersey. He was a member of Artifacts, Leak Bros, and the Weathermen.

== Musical career ==
As half of rap duo Artifacts (with brother El Da Sensei), they released their "graffiti-honoring debut" album Between a Rock and a Hard Place in 1994, and a follow-up album That's Them in 1997. Tame One has released two albums with the Artifacts, eight solo albums, six mixtapes, and five collaborations one with former labelmate Cage as Leak Bros (Waterworld), and one with Del the Funky Homosapien (Parallel Uni-verses). He has worked with artists such as Aesop Rock, El-P, DJ Mr. Len, Breeze Brewin, Travis McCoy, Vast Aire, Yak Ballz, Hussein Fatal, Mos Def, Dro Pesci, etc. He joined the underground supergroup the Weathermen which was formed in 2002 by Cage and El-P, and the same year he released his first solo album and EC debut named When Rappers Attack. Tame One's second solo album O.G. Bobby Johnson appeared in 2005. Next year he issued his next album called Slow Suicide Stimulus, a cooperative project with the Dusted Dons.

In July 2009 Tame One released a music video for his single "Anxiety Attacks" directed by Derek Pike. Credited with making hip-hop's first song about "Molly" (MDMA, the active ingredient in Ecstasy) at this time, Tame met Staten Island rapper Dro Pesci.

Tame One then released an EP at slangcorp.com called Hell or High Water produced by DJ Junkwaffel. He also worked on an Artifacts reunion album No Expiration Date (2022) and promoted a Boom Skwad Recordings EP (CRAZEE, Doin Me and Boom Skwad on Attack).

In 2024, production duo Parallel Thought posthumously produced Acid Tab Vocab, "'Old Jersey Bastard'", and with Xing and Fox Spazmatic. Also in 2024, Young Zee released "Burn Out" and Division East Records re-released The Grudge LP.

== Personal life and death ==
Tame One was the first cousin of rapper Redman. He belonged to graffiti crews FC CREW (Fame City / First Class Crew), originated Boom Skwad Crew (including DJ RhinoCMZ and AKool) as well as LTD (Local Transit Destroyers). He painted pieces, murals and subway trains alongside brother Maliq Griffin (DJ Porno). Tame One died from kidney and heart failure on November 6, 2022, at the age of 52. The medical examiner cited prescribed pharmaceuticals as the likely cause of the heart failure. Rahem's mother Darlene Harris utilizes Instagram and Facebook accounts to continue Tame One's artistic legacy.

== Discography ==
=== Albums ===
Albums
Year	Title	Label
2003	When Rappers Attack	High Times Records
2005	Leeked to the Public	Self Released
2005	O.G. Bobby Johnson	Eastern Conference
2006	Spazmatic	Blazin' Records
2007	The Grudge	Division East
2008	Da Ol' Jersey Bastard	Amalgam Digital
2009	Acid Tab Vocab (with Parallel Thought)	Parallel Thought LTD.
2010	The Hell or High Water EP	Slangcorp
2014	Skwadzilla	Self Released via YouTube (has since been deleted)
2015	Skwadzilla	Self Released via Bandcamp
2015	Skwadzilla (EP)	Blingnot Media
2016	One Flew Over Da Cukoos Nest ep	released by Geo Da Abbott via Bandcamp

== Singles ==
Singles
Year	Title	Label
1994	Wrong Side Of Da Tracks (with Artifacts)	Big Beat/Atlantic
1994	C'mon Wit Da Git Down (with Artifacts)	Big Beat
1995	Dynamite Soul (with Artifacts)	Big Beat
1996	Art Of Facts (with Artifacts)	Big Beat/Atlantic
1996	Art Of Facts / Man Digga Comin' Thru (split with Artifacts & Man Digga)	Big Beat
1996	The Ultimate (with Artifacts)	Big Beat
1998	In The Area / Human Torch (split with Ammbush)	Not On Label
1999	Trife Type Times	Fat Beats
2000	Crazee - Doin Me - Boom Skwad on Attack	Boom Skwad Recordings
2001	Eastern Conference All Stars / Nickel Nine (split with Eastern Conference All Stars & Royce da 5'9")	Eastern Conference Records/Rapster Records
2003	5 Left In the Clip / Tame As It Ever Was (split with the Weathermen)	High Times Records
2003	5 Left in the Clip Original b/w RJD2 Remix (with the Weathermen)	Eastern Conference Records
2003	When Rappers Attack	Eastern Conference Records
2003	Here We Go Again / Wha'll Out (split with 8076)	HipHopSite.com Recordings
2004	Got Wet? / G.O.D. (with Leak Bros)	Eastern Conference Records
2004	Spazmatic - Da Muzik	Ahead Recordings
2006	Roll Up / I.C.U. (with Slow Suicide Stimulus)	Flospot Records

=== Artifacts ===
- Between a Rock and a Hard Place (1994)
- That's Them (1997)
- That's Them: Lost Files 1989-1992 (2018)
- Rare Collabs & Features (2019)
- Best of... (2019)
- No Expiration Date (2022) (with Buckwild)

=== The Weathermen ===
- "The Conspiracy" Mix CD Vol 1" (2003)

=== Leak Bros ===
- Waterworld (2004) (with Cage)

=== Slow Suicide Stimulus ===
- Slow Suicide Stimulus (2006) (with Dusted Dons)

=== Del the Funky Homosapien & Tame One ===
- Parallel Uni-Verses (2009)

=== Black Galactus & the Latino Silver Surfer ===
- Black Galactus & the Latino Silver Surfer (2018) (with Sol Zalez)

=== Young Zee x Tame One ===
- Burn Outz (2024, recorded in 2015)
