= S.A. Smash =

American hip-hop group

- Origin: Columbus, Ohio, U.S.
- Genres: Alternative hip-hop
- Years active: 2003–2008
- Label: Definitive Jux
- Members: Camu Tao (deceased); Metro

S.A. Smash was an American hip-hop duo from Columbus, Ohio. It consisted of the late Camu Tao and Metro. The duo released the album, Smashy Trashy, on Definitive Jux in 2003.

== Discography ==
=== Studio albums ===
- Smashy Trashy (2003)

=== Singles ===
- "Last Night" (2003)
- "Gangsta" / "Smash TV" (2003)
- "Illy" / "Niggales Cage" (2003)

=== Guest appearances ===
- Vast Aire - "KRS-Lightly" from Look Mom... No Hands (2004)
- Slow Suicide Stimulus - "I.C.U." and "Pop Dat Thing" from Slow Suicide Stimulus (2006)
