= Camu Tao =

American rapper (1977–2008)

- Born: Tero Smith; June 26, 1977; Columbus, Ohio, U.S.
- Died: May 25, 2008 (aged 30)
- Genres: Hip hop
- Occupations: Rapper; singer; producer
- Years active: 1997–2008
- Labels: Definitive Jux; Fat Possum Records; Eastern Conference Records; Smash Bros.; B.U.K.A. Entertainment
- Formerly of: S.A. Smash, The Weathermen, MHz Legacy, Central Services, Nighthawks. Couch Boys

Tero Smith (June 26, 1977 – May 25, 2008), better known by his stage name Camu Tao, was an American rapper, singer, and producer.

== Early life ==
Tao was born Tero Smith in Columbus, Ohio, on June 26, 1977.

== Career ==
Tao was signed to Definitive Jux. He was a member of several groups: S.A. Smash, The Weathermen, Central Services (with El-P), and the music collective Cardboard City. He was also part of the MHz crew with Copywrite, RJD2, Jakki tha Motamouth, and Tage Future. Partnering with Cage to form Nighthawks, the two crafted an album during a single three-day creative session.

== Death ==
Tao died of lung cancer at the age of 30 on May 25, 2008, two years after being diagnosed.

== Legacy ==
At the time of his death, Tao was producing a song for Cage's I Never Knew You EP and working on his first solo album for Definitive Jux. On July 9, 2009, El-P announced via Twitter that Tao's album King of Hearts was finished and would be released posthumously on October 20, 2009. It was eventually released by Definitive Jux (in collaboration with Fat Possum Records) on August 17, 2010, along with a free download EP from Central Services. About the album, El-P said, "We all expected to get Camu in the studio and go as far as he wanted to go with the record. The songs are bare, but then again a lot of them are just what he wanted. A lot of them wouldn't have changed much. Knowing Camu, he had a lot of talented musician friends he would have liked to have collaborated and have involved. I do think the album would have been different had he lived to complete it."

Aesop Rock stated in a 2008 interview with The A.V. Club that his next album may contain "a couple of songs about [his] friend Camu". In his song "Racing Stripes", Rock reflected on Tao near the end of his life. Specifically, he noted Tao's unusual haircut and habits Tao had developed. Tao is also the main subject in Rock's song "Get Out of the Car" from his 2016 album The Impossible Kid, reflecting on how the death of Tao drove him to an eight-year-long state of "emotional paralysis" and an increasing trend of self-imposed social isolation. In 2017, when the video for this song was released, Rock remarked, "This May 25th marks nine years since the death of my friend Camu Tao, an event that serves as an emotional and narrative anchor in both this song and my life. I wanted to reflect on things that had changed since, and try to connect some events I hadn't realized were potentially related."

El-P, Tao's friend and founder of the Definitive Jux label, dedicated his album Cancer 4 Cure to Tao's memory. The song "The Full Retard" from the album features a looped vocal sample, "You should pump this shit like they do in the future", taken from Tao's lyrics on his track "When You're Going Down", and a bridge where the lyric, "lil' bitch", is repeated in a style derived from previous collaborations between the two artists, most notably Tao's track "Hold the Floor", to which El-P remarks, "That's some Camu shit." He later indirectly spoke about Tao in his verse on the track "Thursday in the Danger Room" from Run the Jewels' 2016 album Run the Jewels 3. In a now-deleted tweet responding to a fan's question, El-P confirmed that the verse was about an experience he had with Tao while Tao had cancer.

== Discography ==
=== Albums ===
- Nighthawks (2002) (with Cage, as Nighthawks)
- Forever Frozen in Television Time (2010) (with El-P, as Central Services)
- King of Hearts (2010)

=== Mixtapes ===
- Blair Cosby: Cape Cod (Going for De Gold) (2004)
- Blair Cosby II: The Wali Era (2005)
- Blair Cosby: Cereal Carpens (97 Season) (2005)

=== Singles ===
- "Hear Me Talking to You" (2001)
- "Hold the Floor" b/w "Wireless" (2001)
- "Cop Hell" (2003) (with Cage, as Nighthawks)
- "WMR" (2004) (with El-P)

=== Guest appearances ===
- Copywrite - "Three Words" from The High Exhaulted (2002)
- El-P - "Accidents Don't Happen" from Fantastic Damage (2002)
- Vakill - "Forbidden Scriptures" from The Darkest Cloud (2003)
- Form One - "Three Poisonous Darts" from Three Poisonous Darts / Legion Of The Doom / Planet Meatball 12" (2003)
- Cage - "Come to Daddy" from Weatherproof (2003)
- Blockhead - "Jet Son" from Sunday Seance 12" (2004)
- The Weatherman - "Gut You" from Presents Eastern Conference All Stars III (2003)
- Aesop Rock - "Rickety Rackety" from Fast Cars, Danger, Fire and Knives (2005)
- The Perceptionists - "Party Hard" from Black Dialogue (2005)
- Cage - "The Death of Chris Palko" from Hell's Winter (2005)
- Prefuse 73 - "Now You're Leaving" from Surrounded by Silence (2005)
- Slow Suicide Stimulus - "Regardless"; "Cutty Sharks" from Slow Suicide Stimulus (2006)
- El-P - "The Overly Dramatic Truth" from I'll Sleep When You're Dead (2007)
- Copywrite - "Mega Mega" from The Life and Times of Peter Nelson (2010)

=== Production (Dope) ===
- "Emergency"; "Eastern Conference All Stars" [Evidecnce; All East, 2001]
- "E=MC2" (Remix) [Evidence & Mr. Eon, 2001]
- "Fire It Up"; "Ready, Aim..."; "Hear Me Though" [Copywrite, 2002]
- "Teen Age Death" [Cage, 2002]
- (many tracks) [Nighthawks, 2002]
- "Standing Room Only"; "Wanna (But I Won't!); "High Heat" [High & Mighty, 2003]
- "Come to Daddy" [Cage, 2003]
- "Got Wet?" [Leak Bros, 2004]
- "KRS-Lighty" [Vast Aire, 2004]
- "No Escape" [Yak Ballz, 2004]
- "Making the Jux" [C-Rayz Walz, 2006]
- "Days" [Cage, 2006]
- "Cutty Sharks"; "Regardless"'; "I.C.U."; "Firewater"; "Pop Dat Thing" [Slow Suicide Stimulus, 2006]
- "Blood Sport" [Mighty Joseph, 2008]
- "Out of Range"; "Taking Good Care" [Yak Ballz, 2008]
- "When You're Going Down" [Camu, 2009]
- "Rob the Club" [Copywrite, 2010]
