= The High & Mighty =

American hip-hop group

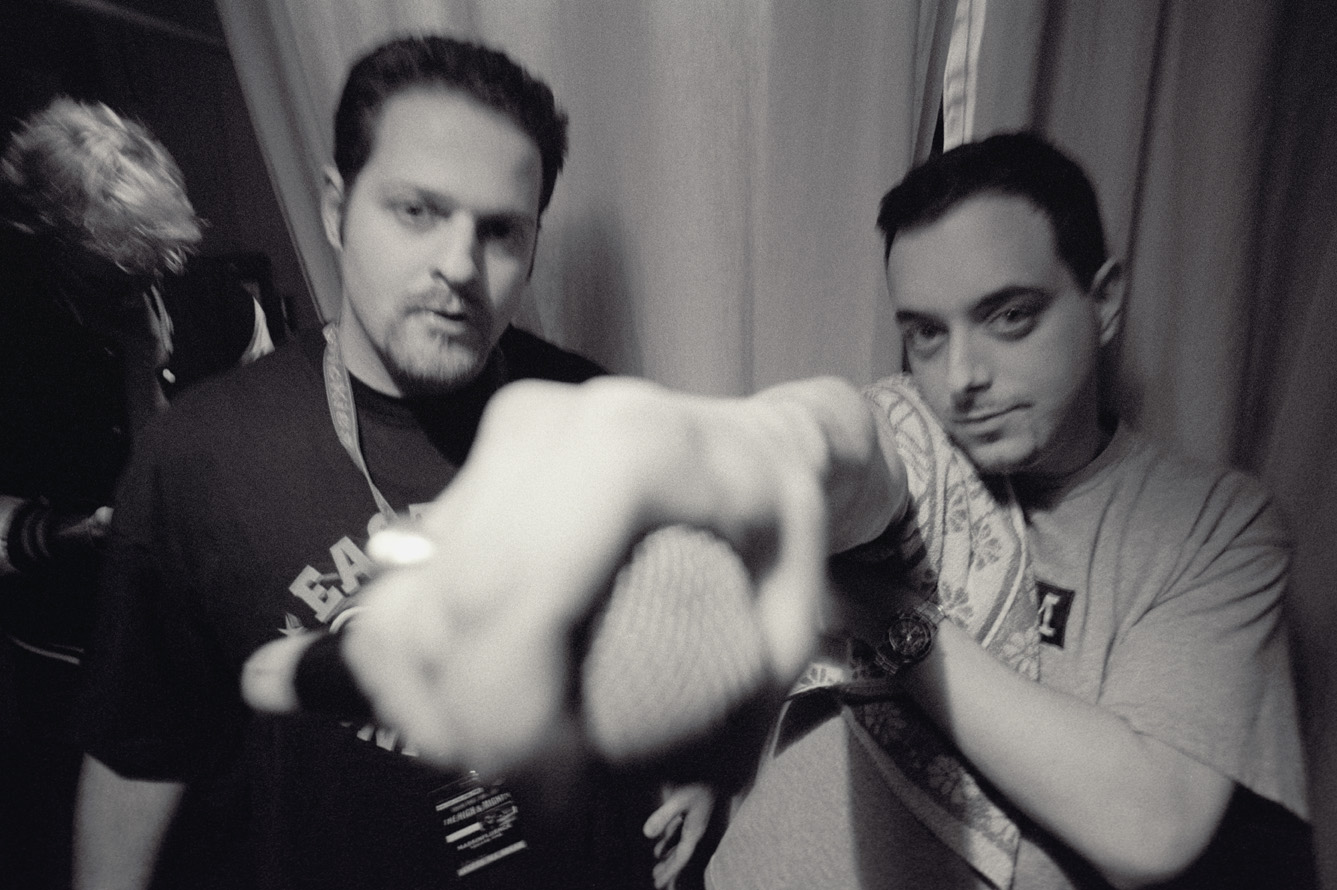
- The High & Mighty in 1998

Background information
- Origin: Philadelphia, Pennsylvania, U.S.
- Genre: Hip-hop
- Years active: 1996–present
- Labels: Rawkus, Eastern Conference
- Members: Mr. Eon; DJ Mighty Mi

The High & Mighty is an American hip-hop duo from Philadelphia, composed of rapper Mr. Eon (Eric Meltzer, "The High") and producer DJ Mighty Mi (Milo Berger, "The Mighty").

== Career ==
Their commercial debut was in 1999 on the underground rap label Rawkus with their album, Home Field Advantage, featuring rappers, such as Mos Def, Kool Keith, What? What?, Cage, Pharoahe Monch, Evidence of Dilated Peoples, Defari, Thirstin Howl III, and Eminem. They later left Rawkus, distributing the records issued by their own record company Eastern Conference Records via Landspeed Records. They also established a group called Smut Peddlers with Cage and published an album called Porn Again. In 2002, they co-wrote and co-produced Princess Superstar's international hit single "Bad Babysitter", with Mr. Eon also providing additional vocals.

The titles of their albums and the name of their record label are both references to one of their favorite musical subjects, American professional team sports. Home Field Advantage, for example, features numerous sporting references, including the track "Friendly Game of Football" and mentions of the '69 New York Mets, Cris Carter and Jason Sehorn, among others. José Reyes and David Wright of the Mets were mentioned in the song "Key Master" ("We the future like Reyes and David Wright on Fireworks Night"). Another recurring source of lyrical fodder is the Star Wars film series, with Home Field Advantage including lines about Jedi master Mace Windu, the bounty hunter Greedo, Anakin Skywalker and the droid C-3PO.

== Feuds ==
=== Masta Ace ===
Rapper Masta Ace called them "a couple of high whiteys" in his hit battle rap "Acknowledge". According to Ace himself, another rapper had told him that The High & Mighty had dissed him at one of their shows. This prompted him to create the song Acknowledge on his 2001 album Disposable Arts. Ace eventually learned that he was misinformed, but the track had already been released, presumably ending the feud.

=== Cage and Copywrite ===
They also had a feud with rapper Cage, which resulted in "Public Property" from Cage's 2005 album, Hell's Winter; along with Copywrite on the track "Poorly Promote This", which was produced by Twiz the Beat Pro. This feud eventually dissolved, seeing both Cage and Copywrite featured on the High & Mighty's 2025 studio album, Sound of Market.

== Popular culture ==
Their song "B-Boy Document '99" was featured in the popular Tony Hawk's Pro Skater 2 video game. A music video for the track "I Wanna (But I Won't)" from The Highlite Zone features actor Michael Rapaport and was directed by Joey Boukadakis.

== Personnel ==
- Mr. Eon – rap vocals (1996–present)
- DJ Mighty Mi – producer (1996–present)

== Discography ==
=== Albums ===
- 1999 – Home Field Advantage (Eastern Conference/Rawkus)
- 2002 – Air Force 1 (Eastern Conference/Landspeed)
- 2003 – The Highlite Zone (Eastern Conference/Caroline)
- 2005 – The 12th Man (Eastern Conference)
- 2025 – Sound of Market (Eastern Conference)

=== Singles ===
- 1997 – "It's All for You" / "Hands On Experience" / "Cranial Lumps" / "Open Mic Night" / "The Meaning"
- 1998 – "B-Boy Document" / "Mind, Soul & Body"
- 1999 – "B-Boy Document '99" / "Chaos" / "Dirty Decibels" / "Sun, Moon & Stars" / "The Conflict"
- 2000 – "Dick Starbuck Porno Detective"
- 2003 – "Take It Off"
- 2024 – "Funk 'O Mart"

=== Collaborative albums ===
- 2001 – Porn Again (with Cage, as Smut Peddlers)

=== Guest appearances ===
- 2002 – Princess Superstar – Bad Babysitter
