= Buck 65 discography =

Buck 65 is a hip-hop artist from Nova Scotia, Canada. He has released 20 solo albums, 7 collaboration albums, 1 compilation album, 5 mixtapes, and 8 extended plays.

== Solo albums ==
Stinkin' Rich (pre-Buck 65 name)

- Game Tight (1995)
- Weirdo Magnet (Original version) (1996)

Buck 65

- Year Zero (1996)
- Weirdo Magnet (1996)
- Language Arts (1996)
- Vertex (1998)
- Man Overboard (Anticon, 2001)
- Synesthesia (Endemik, 2001)
- Square (WEA, 2002)
- Talkin' Honky Blues (WEA, 2003)
- Secret House Against the World (WEA, 2005)
- Situation (Strange Famous, 2007)
- 20 Odd Years (WEA, 2011)
- Laundromat Boogie (2014)
- Neverlove (2014)
- King Of Drums (2022)
- Super Dope (2023)
- Punk Rock B-Boy (2023)
- North American Adonis (2023)
- Keep Moving (2025)
- Do Not Bend (2026)

== Collaboration albums ==
Sebutones (Buck 65 with Sixtoo)

- 50/50 Where It Counts (1997)

with Greymatter

- Johnny Rockwell Meets Henry Krinkle (1998)

Bike for Three! (Buck 65 with Greetings from Tuskan)

- More Heart Than Brains (2009)
- So Much Forever (2014)

with Controller 7

- Tommy and Richie present "Billy" (2020)

Double Nice (Buck 65 with Birdapres)

- The Last Dig (2022)

with Tachichi

- Flash Grenade (2022)

== Compilation albums ==
- No Children (2022)

== Mixtapes ==
- Strong Arm (2006)
- Dirtbike Vol.1 (2008)
- Dirtbike Vol.2 (2008)
- Dirtbike Vol.3 (2008)
- Dirtbike Vol.4 (2015)

== Extended plays ==
- Chin Music (1993) (as Stinkin' Rich)
- Psoriasis (1996) (as Sebutones with Sixtoo)
- This Right Here Is an EP (2004)
- Dirtbike (2008)
- Unhip (2010)
- 20 Odd Years-Vol. 1 Avant (2011)
- 20 Odd Years-Vol. 2 Distance (2011)
- 20 Odd Years-Vol. 3 Albuquerque (2011)
- 20 Odd Years-Vol. 4 Cenotaph (2011)

== Singles ==
- "Stolen Bass" (1994)
- "Sebutone Def" (1997) (Sebutones)
- "The Wildlife" (1998)
- "The Centaur" (1999)
- "Wicked & Weird" (2003)
- "463" (2004)
- "Sore" (2004)
- "Devil's Eyes" (2005)
- "Way Back When" (2007)
- "Dang" (2008)
- "Ode To Levon" (2012)
- "Smurf Burps" (2015)
- "Custom Auto" (2022) (with Birdapres as "Double Nice")
- "Textural Healing" (2022)
- "Bad Santa" (2022)
- "The New Sammy Sosa" (2022)

== Music videos ==
- "To Mock a Killingbird" (1998) from "Sebutone Def"
- "Pants on Fire" (2001) from Man Overboard
- "Phil" (2003) from Square
- "Wicked & Weird" (2003) from Talkin' Honky Blues
- "463" (2004) from Talkin' Honky Blues
- "Kennedy Killed the Hat" (2005) from Secret House Against the World
- "Devil's Eyes" (2005) from Secret House Against the World
- "Dang" (2008) from Situation
- "Shutter Buggin'" (2008) from Situation
- "Zombie Delight" (2011) from 20 Odd Years
- "Paper Airplanes" (2011) from 20 Odd Years
- "Who by Fire" (2013) from 20 Odd Years
- "Super Pretty Naughty" (2014) from Neverlove

== Guest appearances ==
- The Goods - "Inspectators" from Secondary Education (1998)
- Sixtoo - "Sebutones Resurgence" from The Psyche Intangible (1998)
- Sixtoo - "The Canada Project" from Songs I Hate (and Other People Moments) (2000)
- Al Tuck - The New High Road of Song (2001)
- Boom Bip - "The Unthinkable" from Seed to Sun (2002)
- Stigg of the Dump - "Five Dollar Jesus" and "Pointing Fingers" from Still Alive at the Veglia Lounge (2002)
- Omid - "Double Header" from Monolith (2003)
- L'Armée des 12 - "Néons & Pierres Précieuses" from Cadavres Exquis (2002)
- Gravité Zero - "Trou noir" from Gravité Zero (2003)
- DJ Signify - "Stranded", "Winter's Going", "Red to Black", and "Where Did She Go?" from Sleep No More (2004)
- Feist - "One Evening" video (2005)
- North American Hallowe'en Prevention Initiative - "Do They Know It's Hallowe'en?" (2005)
- Matt Mays - "When the Angels Make Contact" from When the Angels Make Contact (2006)
- Hip Club Groove - "Shootin the Gift" from Trailer Park Hip Hop (1994)
- k-os - "Ballad for Noah" from Atlantis: Hymns for Disco (2006)
- Tagaq - "Gentle" and "Want" from Auk/Blood (2008)
- Classified - "Loonie" from Self Explanatory (2009)
- D-Sisive - "The Superbowl Is Over" from Let the Children Die (2009)
- Themselves - "Kick the Ball" from The Free Houdini (2009)
- Serengeti & Polyphonic - "La La Lala" from Terradactyl (2009)
- Awol One & Factor Chandelier - "Daze Go Bye" from The Landmark (2011)
- Laura J Martin - "Kissbye Goodnight" from "Spy" b/w "Kissbye Goodnight" (2011)
- Metermaids (duo) - "Kill the Crow" from Rooftop Shake (2011)
- Meaghan Smith - "Baby, It's Cold Outside" from It Snowed (2011)
- Kristoff Krane - "Infectious" from Fanfaronade (2012)
- Cadence Weapon - "(You Can't Stop) The Machine" from Hope in Dirt City (2012)
- Jenn Grant - "Spades" from Compostela (2014)
- B. Dolan - "Jailbreak" from Kill The Wolf (2015) (also featuring Aesop Rock and Dave Lamb of Brown Bird)

== Compilation appearances ==
- "Untitled" on Music for the Advancement of Hip Hop (1999)
- "Pen Thief" on Giga Single (2001)
- "Pack Animal" on Tags of the Times 3 (2001)
- "Blood Pt. 2" on Dark Was the Night (2009)

== Production credits ==
- The Goods - "Inspectators" from Secondary Education (1998)
- Kunga 219 - "Returned" and "Things of Beauty" from Tharpa's Transcripts... A Time and a Place (2000)
- Sage Francis - "Got Up This Morning" from Human the Death Dance (2007)
- Moka Only - “I Mean Bizznizz” from Carrots and Eggs (2008)
- Sage Francis - "S.A.G.E. Bastard", "I Trusted You", "House of Bees" and "Be a Star" from Sick of Wasting (2009)
- Themselves - "The Mark (Buck 65 Remix)" from Crowns Down & Company (2010)
- Noah23 - "Motor Head" from Heart of Rock (2010)
