= Hip Hop Eh =

- Film poster
- Directed by: Joe Klymkiw
- Produced by: JOI Productions
- Starring: Maestro Fresh Wes, Shad, and Tom Green
- Release date: March 15, 2012
- Country: Canada
- Language: English

Hip Hop Eh is a 2012 documentary film about the Canadian hip-hop music industry. A variety of artists, promoters and producers were interviewed about their experiences with creating and marketing hip-hop and rap music.

== Production ==
The film was directed by Joe Klymkiw; this was his first documentary film and produced by JOI Productions. Joe Klymkiw was born and raised in Canada. While growing up in Vancouver, he was always interested in hip-hop and fell in love with rap. He created this film over the course of five years, mostly around Vancouver. It was shot for $15,000 on three different cameras.

== Synopsis ==
The plot is an attempt to educate the Canadian public or any viewer about the hip-hop scene in Canada- do we have one? What is it? The director meets with a lot of famous Canadian hip-hop artists, as well as public in the street and asks them questions about the hip-hop scene in Canada. He asks questions such as: "what is the Canadian identity" and "what is hip-hop", which he receives a variety of different responses from those he interviews. The artists he interviews explain how hard it is to make it in the music industry in Canada, being the country in the shadow of the USA when it comes to music, artists explain the obstacles they have to overcome in order to be a famous Canadian hip-hop artist today. One artist says that first your music must be sent to the USA, then approved in the USA, and finally it’ll be played in Canada, which makes it harder to be famous in Canada. One artist expressed, "you [as the artist] have to work 10x harder than anybody else", although now is the right time to do it because hip-hop is very popular. The director goes on the street to ask random people in public what they think of the Canadian hip-hop scene. One woman on the street says, "I don’t know much about the Canadian hip-hop scene", whereas one guy on the street believed "we have the biggest underground hip-hop scene on the face of the earth right now". Many of the artists had different point of views on how they exert their music. Some of the artists expressed they want free music, others do not care about the radio, and others do care about radio because they are out to make a lot of money. The interaction between Canada and its hip-hop scene is small- only 3 radios play hip-hop music and it’s more popular in bigger cities in Canada making it harder for Canadian artists to get out there. This film proves that Canadian artists still manage to get out there and make a different in the hip-hop scene.

== Content ==
People who were interviewed for the film include Birdapres, Buck 65, Cadence Weapon, Checkmate, Chin Injeti, Classified, Grand Analog, Kardinal Offishall, Maestro Fresh Wes, mcenroe, Michie Mee, Moka Only, Rascalz, Shad, Swollen Members, Z-Trip and Tom Green.

== Screenplay ==
The documentary was released on March 15, 2012 and was played in cities across Canada, such as Vancouver, Winnipeg, Toronto and Ontario.

== Critical response ==
The Globe and Mail praised the film, but noted that some sections of the industry were not represented. The Director admitted some key players were missing from the final product, but he still feels like it properly painted a picture of the Canadian hip-hop scene.
