= Ian Kamau =

- Born: Ian Prieto-Mctair
- Origin: Toronto, Canada
- Genres: Canadian hip hop, spoken word
- Occupations: Rapper, poet

Ian Kamau (born Ian Prieto-Mctair) is a Canadian writer, hip hop and spoken word artist, writer, designer, and visual artist from Toronto, Canada. Kamau is the son of Trinidadian Canadian artists and filmmakers Claire Prieto and Roger McTair.

Kamau and his father created Loss, a multimedia performance of live music and video performed at The Apollo Stages at the Victoria Theatre in New York City.

== Discography ==
=== Singles ===
- An Ocean Between Us (2016)
- You, I (2014)

=== Albums ===
- Selected tracks from September 9 Vol. 1 & 2 (Mixtape) (2009)
- Vol. 3 Love and Other Struggles (Mixtape) (2010)
- One Day Soon (2011)

=== EPs ===
- Cocoons (2011)
- First (2003)

=== Collaborations ===
Ian Kamau has been featured on the following tracks:

Year	Song	Artist	Album
2002	"Masquerade"	k-os	Exit
2004	"Papercutz"	k-os	Joyful Rebellion
2006	"Ballad of Noah"	k-os	Atlantis: Hymns for Disco
2007	"What We All Want"	Shad	The Old Prince
2007	"Outro"	Shad	The Old Prince
2010	"Lucky 1's"	Shad	TSOL
2013	"Intro: Lost"	Shad	Flying Colours
2013	"I'll Be Waiting (When Freedom Comes)"	Freedom Writers	NOW
2014	"Miscommunication"	Beatchild	Soul Movement Vol. 2
2018	"Another Year"	Shad	A Short Story About a War
2018	"Whole Worlds"	Tumi	Whole Worlds
