= Weirdo Magnet =

Studio album by Buck 65
- Released: 1996
- Recorded: ?
- Genre: Alternative hip hop
- Length: 50:57
- Label: Independent/Metaforensics
- Producer: Buck 65

Buck 65 chronology
Sebutonedef (1996)	Weirdo Magnet (1996)	Language Arts (1996)

Weirdo Magnet is a 1996 studio album by Buck 65, re-released by Warner Music Canada in 2002.

== Track listing ==
A 2-disc promo for the album had titles for the track:

Disc 1:

1. "Throw II"- 1:26
2. "Shopping for Shoes"- 3:54
3. "Taster's Choice"- 3:11
4. "Cat Piss"- 3:12
5. "Thought So"- 3:57
6. "Boogie n' Frenzy"- 4:16
7. "Amber Valletta"- 2:18
8. "Chin Music '96"- 3:10
9. "Stranded Without Pants"- 1:27
10. "Beatles Break"- 4:06
11. "Company"- 1:23
12. "Who You Frontin' For?"- 3:53
13. "Maintenance"- 3:43
14. "Plus Signs and Positivity"- 2:57
15. "Urine Trouble"- 2:20
16. "Shalom Harlow"- :44
17. "Kiss My Ass"- 3:39
18. "Fuckin' Chicks, Huh?"- 2:53
19. "Your Pissin' Me Off"- 4:35
20. "Shout It Out"- 4:05

Disc 2:

1. "Come Home"- 1:17
2. "Year Zero"- 1:58
3. "You Know the Science"- 3:21
4. "Baron Karza"- 5:15
5. "In a Bad Way"- 3:02
6. "Wildlife, Pt. 1"- 2:38
7. "Chillwack"- 3:13
8. "PR221"- :36
9. "The Basement Show"- 3:35
10. "State of the Art"- 2:12
11. "Wildlife, Pt. 2"- 2:56
12. "Style #386"- 2:15
13. "Providence"- 3:13
14. "The Back of My Hand"- 1:27
15. "Male Model"- 3:32
16. "Wildlife, Pt. 3"- 3:37
17. "Speak of the Devil"- :37
18. "Swung at a Bad Pitch"- 4:49
19. "This is a Joke"- 2:31

Warner Release

1. "Track 01" - 2:10
2. "Track 02" - 1:44
3. "Track 03" - 2:15
4. "Track 04" - 2:59
5. "Track 05" - 3:28
6. "Track 06" - 2:55
7. "Track 07" - 2:52
8. "Track 08" - 1:12
9. "Track 09" - 2:02
10. "Track 10" - 1:01
11. "Track 11" - 1:52
12. "Track 12" - 2:16
13. "Track 13" - 1:16
14. "Track 14" - 2:03
15. "Track 15" - 4:35
16. "Track 16" - 1:47
17. "Track 17" - 2:33
18. "Track 18" - 1:10
19. "Track 19" - 3:34
20. "Track 20" - 0:54
21. "Track 21" - 3:27
22. "Track 22" - 0:54
23. "Track 23" - 2:11
- Note: The CD release of the album is titled as above, however a review by Buck 65 references titles of some tracks, including "Track 10" as "The Zyzygy".
