= YY =

YY or variants may refer to:

- YY.com, a major Chinese social network
- yy (digraph), digraph used in various Latin alphabets
- Yy (musician), Canadian musician
- YY, the call sign prefix for radio stations in Venezuela
- Y. Y., pseudonym of Robert Wilson Lynd (1879–1949), Irish essayist
- Peptide YY 3-36, a peptide secreted by the gut in response to a meal, and reduces appetite
- The Space Pirates, a 1969 Doctor Who serial (production code YY)

== See also ==
- W (disambiguation)
