= Pip Skid =

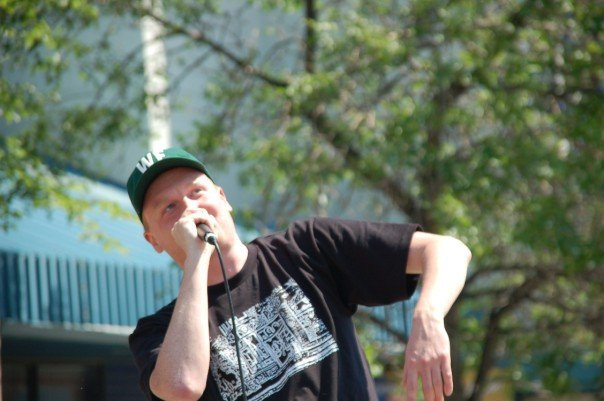
- Pip Skid performing at the 2007 Ellice Street Festival in Winnipeg, Manitoba.

Background information
- Also known as: Pipi Skid; Wicked Nut
- Born: Patrick Skene; Brandon, Manitoba, Canada
- Genre: Hip-hop
- Occupations: Rapper; songwriter; record producer
- Years active: 1994-present
- Label: Peanuts & Corn Records
- Formerly of: Farm Fresh

Patrick Skene, better known by his stage name Pip Skid, is a Canadian rapper and record producer. He is a member of the independent hip-hop record label Peanuts & Corn Records. Skid is known for his distinctive gravel-throated vocals.

== Career ==
In the early 1990s, under the stage name Wicked Nut, he was a member of Canadian hip hop group Farm Fresh with mcenroe and DJ Hunnicut. The group released an EP and three albums. He was also a member of other crews such as Fermented Reptile, Hip Hop Weiners and Break Bread.

In 2001, Skid took part in the Close To The Coast Festival in Charlottetown, Prince Edward Island.

In 2004, Skid's album Funny Farm was released; it hit #32 on Chart Attack's combined charts. His single "Alone Again" from this album Funny Farm was played in rotation on the MuchMusic network. In the following year, the album received a nomination for Outstanding Rap/Hip-Hop Recording at the Western Canadian Music Awards.

In 2005, Skid and fellow rapper mcenroe released an album, Funny Farm 2 which hit #3 on Chart Attack's hip-hop charts. Skid's 2010 album Skid Row peaked at #4 on Chart Attack's hip-hop charts on May 1, 2010.

In 2011, Skid released the album People Are The Worst.

== Discography ==
=== Solo ===
- Friends4Ever (Peanuts & Corn, 2001)
- Money Matters EP (Peanuts & Corn, 2002)
- I'm Mean Mixtape (Peanuts & Corn, 2005)
- Funny Farm (Peanuts & Corn, 2004)
- The Pip Donahue Show EP (Independent, 2007)
- Skid Row (Foultone, 2010)
- People Are The Worst (Marathon of Dope, 2011)

=== Collaborations ===
Farm Fresh

- The Space EP (Peanuts & Corn, 1994)
- Crazy Fiction (Peanuts & Corn, 1995)
- Played Out (Peanuts & Corn, 1999)
- Time is Running Out (Peanuts & Corn, 2005)

=== Other collaborations ===
- with Fermented Reptile - Let's Just Call You "Quits" (Peanuts & Corn, 1999)
- with John Smith - Peanuts & Corn Spring 2001 (Peanuts & Corn, 2001)
- with Hip Hop Weiners - All Beef, No Chicken (Peanuts & Corn, 2002)
- with Break Bread - Break Bread EP (2004)
- with Mcenroe - Disenfranchised 2 / Funny Farm 2 (Peanuts & Corn, 2005)
- with John Smith and Skratch Bastid - Taking Care of Business (First Things First, 2005)

=== Guest appearances ===
- Best of Winnipeg Vol. 1 - The Emcees (DVD, Quality Hip-Hop)
- Culturama Video Collection Vol. 4 (DVD, Culturama)
- DJ Neoteric - Indie-cent Exposure Part 3 (CD, Futility Records)
- Epic - Local Only (CD, Clothes Horse Records)
- Epic - 8:30 in Newfoundland (CD, Clothes Horse Records)
- Fishin' In Troubled Waters - Fishin' In Troubled Waters (CD, Hip Hop Infinity Recordings)
- Mcenroe - 5 Years in the Factory (CD, Vertical Form)
- Mood Ruff - Maxim (CD, Slo Coach Recordings)
- Park-Like Setting - School Day 2 Garbage Day 4 (CD, Peanuts & Corn)
- Peanuts & Corn - Summer 2002 (12", Peanuts & Corn)
- Peanuts & Corn - Factory Seconds (CD, Peanuts & Corn)
- Recyclone - Corroding the Dead World (CD, Clothes Horse Records)
- Rheostatics - Nitelines Recording Sessions (CD, Drog Canadian Recordings)
- Scribble Jam - Tour Documentary (DVD + CD, Scribble Magazine Productions)
- Sixtoo - Songs I Hate (And Other People Moments) (CD, Anticon)
- Sound Barriers - Sound Barriers (CD, Sound Barrier Recordings)
- The Goods - 4 Four (CD, Camobear)
- Various Artists - Bare Skin Compilation (CD, HipHopHotSpot.com)
- Various Artists - States of Abuse (CD, Entartete Kunst)
