= Friends 4 Ever (Pip Skid album) =

Friends4Ever

Studio album by Pip Skid
- Released: 2001
- Genre: Rap
- Label: Peanuts & Corn Records (Canada)(CD)

Pip Skid chronology
Friends4Ever (2001)	Money Matters (2002)

Professional ratings
Review scores
Source	Rating
Exclaim	(Favourable)
Winnipeg Free Press	(Favourable)

Friends4Ever is Pip Skid's debut solo album released in 2001.

== Track listing ==
1. "Intro"
2. "Life is 2 Easy pt. I"
3. "Life is 2 Easy pt. II" (featuring Mcenroe)
4. "Towel Snap" (featuring Gumshoe Strut )
5. "Hypochondriac"
6. "All up in This Piece" (featuring Epic)
7. "True Blue" (featuring Recyclone )
8. "Crantinis at 15,000 Feet" (featuring John Smith)
9. "Gun Lobby"
10. "Long Live Bruce Willis" (featuring Recyclone, Kunga219, Gruf the Druid, Shazzam and Knowself )
11. "S.K.I.L.S"
12. "Straight Jacket"
13. "Raggedy Anne"
14. "Dish Pig" (featuring Mcenroe)
15. "Varycloseveins" (featuring Unleavnd )
