= Friends 4 Ever =

Friends 4 Ever may refer to:

== Film and TV ==
- Friends 4 Ever, 2011 Halloween short film written and directed by Shane Dawson
- Amigos x siempre (English title: Friends 4 Ever) Mexican children's telenovela produced by Rosy Ocampo for Televisa in 2000
- Amigos X Siempre (soundtrack) for the Mexican television series ¡Amigos X Siempre! ("Friends 4 Ever")

== Music ==
- Friends 4 Ever, album by Michael W. Smith 2001 Dove Youth/Children's Musical Album of the Year - Friends Are Friends Forever
- "Friends 4 Ever" (beFour album), 2009
- "Friends 4 Ever" (Pip Skid album), Canadian rapper 2001
- "Friends-4-Ever", song by American sampler Girl Talk from his album Secret Diary
- "Friends 4 ever", Malayalam song from the album Malayalee by band Team Malayalee Music of Kerala 2008
- "Friends 4 Ever", song (Jan Lindvaag, Aleena Gibson) Follow Your Heart (Nikki Webster album)

== See also ==
- Friends Forever (disambiguation)
