= TSOL (album) =

Studio album by Shad
- Released: 25 May 2010
- Genre: Hip-hop
- Length: 40:55
- Labels: Black Box; Decon
- Producers: DJ T Lo; I.K. Koiter; Ric Notes; Me&John; Classified; Rel McCoy; EOM; Rich Kidd; Heights

Shad chronology
The Old Prince (2007)	TSOL (2010)	Flying Colours (2013)

TSOL is the third studio album by Canadian rapper Shad. It was released in Canada on 25 May 2010 and in the United States on 5 October 2010. It is his second album released on Black Box Recordings, and his first album of new material since 2007's Polaris Music Prize-nominated The Old Prince and much like The Old Prince, TSOL also contains 13 tracks.

The first single, "Yaa I Get It", was released in April 2010. A music video was released on April 20.

The album was a shortlisted nominee for the 2010 Polaris Music Prize, and won the Juno Award for Rap Recording of the Year at the 2011 Juno Awards.

== Tour ==
The album was supported with a cross-Canada tour, featuring opening acts Grand Analog in Western Canada and D-Sisive in Ontario.

== Critical reception ==
Professional ratings
Aggregate scores
Source	Rating
Metacritic	81/100
Review scores
Source	Rating
Alternative Press	4/5 stars
Cokemachineglow	81%
HipHopDX	4/5 stars
MSN Music (Expert Witness)	A−
Now	4/5 stars
Pitchfork	7.2/10
PopMatters	8/10
RapReviews	8.5/10
Tom Hull	A−
URB	4/5 stars

At Metacritic, which assigns a weighted average score out of 100 to reviews from mainstream critics, the album received an average score of 81, based on 10 reviews, indicating "universal acclaim".

The album was ranked number two in Exclaim!'s 2010 hip-hop rankings, with the magazine writing that Shad is "the rare MC who conveys wisdom without being preachy. More than anything, he's versatile, able to seamlessly switch from fierce, hilarious battle raps on "Yaa I Get It" to heartfelt reflection over the contemplative piano and guitars of "At the Same Time" without seeming contradictory." Complex named TSOL the 14th best Canadian album of the 2010s.

== Track listing ==
No.	Title	Producer(s)	Length
1.	"Intro"	DJ T Lo; I.K. Koiter	1:52
2.	"Rose Garden" (featuring Lisa Lobsinger)	DJ T Lo	2:59
3.	"Keep Shining" (featuring Lady Londa)	Ric Notes	3:28
4.	"Lucky 1's" (featuring Ian Kamau, Brendan Canning, and Lisa Lobsinger)	Me&John	4:04
5.	"A Good Name"	Classified	2:28
6.	"We Are the Ones (Reservoir Poetry)" (featuring Rel McCoy)	Rel McCoy	4:09
7.	"Telephone" (featuring Lisa Lobsinger)	DJ T Lo	3:39
8.	"Call Waiting (Interlude)"	Ric Notes	1:52
9.	"Yaa I Get It"	EOM; Me&John	3:51
10.	"Listen" (featuring Brett Fliesser)	Rich Kidd	2:57
11.	"At the Same Time" (featuring Justin Nozuka)	Heights	4:55
12.	"We, Myself and I"	Me&John	3:42
13.	"Outro"		0:59
Total length:			40:55

Expanded edition bonus track
No.	Title	Producer(s)	Length
14.	"It's About Time" (featuring Promise)	Rich Kidd	3:18
Total length:			44:22

== Charts ==
Chart	Peak position
Canadian Albums Chart	24
