= A Short Story About a War =

Studio album by Shad
- Released: 26 October 2018
- Genres: Canadian hip-hop; alternative hip-hop; jazz rap
- Length: 39:19
- Label: Secret City Records

Shad chronology
Flying Colours (2013)	A Short Story About a War (2018)	TAO (2021)

Singles from A Short Story About War
- 1. "The Fool Pt. 1 (Get it Got it Good)" Released: 26 July 2018; 2. "The Fool Pt. 3 (State of Mind)" Released: 29 August 2018; 3. "The Stone Throwers (Gone in a Blink)" Released: 26 September 2018

A Short Story About a War is the fifth studio album by Canadian rapper Shad, released in Canada on 26 October 2018.

== Background ==
A Short Story About a War is a concept album focused around The Fool in a war controlled by the Snipers, Revolutionaries, the Establishment, and the Stone-Throwers, described as "holding a mirror to our world – a provocative story told through disarmingly catchy songs that weaves through issues of migration, environment, politics and above all, the human spirit."

== Singles ==
He had released the singles for this album "The Fool Pt. 1 (Get it Got it Good)" on 26 July 2018, along with a music video, "The Fool Pt. 3 (State of Mind)" on 29 August 2018, along with a music video, and the song "The Stone Throwers (Gone in a Blink)" on 26 September 2018.

== Critical reception ==
Professional ratings
Review scores
Source	Rating
Exclaim!	8/10
The Spill Magazine	9/10
Voir	4/5
Spectrum Culture	4/5

A Short Story about a War has received generally positive reviews from critics. Eric Lowers from Exclaim! said, "Shad's A Short Story About a War isn't a one-listen album, but rather one with multiple layers that need to be peeled back to fully grasp its concept.". The Spill Magazine declared the album for Editor's Picks and Nicholas Musilli states that, "A Short Story About A War delivers the raw reality of injustice, greed, and racism in our present time and space. Shad's sixth studio album stands out as collage of expressionism, a mixed-media of sorts." and that "A Short Story About A War delivers in the most uncomfortable way, while difficult at times, it speaks an honest emotional truth." In July 2019, A Short Story about a War was shortlisted for the 2019 Polaris Music Prize.

== Track listing ==
No.	Title	Length
1.	"Intro: Sniper"
2.	"The Revolution/The Establishment"
3.	"The Stone Throwers (Gone in a Blink)"
4.	"Get It Got It Good Intro"
5.	"The Fool Pt. 1 (Get It Got It Good)"
6.	"Magic Intro"
7.	"Magic" (featuring Lido Pimienta)
8.	"The Fool Pt. 2 (Water)" (featuring Steven Mulcare)
9.	"Sniper Interlude"
10.	"Peace/War"
11.	"The Fool Pt. 3 (Frame of Mind)" (featuring KAYTRANADA)
12.	"Another Year" (Featuring Ian Kamau and Eternia)
13.	"All I Need" (Featuring Yukon Blonde)

=== Personnel ===
The following personnel are the known album contributors:

- Tim "2oolman" Hill
- Eternia
- Ian Kamau
- Kaytranada
- Steven Mulcare
- Lido Pimienta
- DJ T Lo.
- Yukon Blonde
- Paul Chin
