= Drive (CBC Music) =

- Genre: Drive time music
- Running time: 3.5 hours
- Country of origin: Canada
- Language(s): English
- Home station: CBC Music
- Hosted by: Rich Terfry
- Original release: September 2, 2008 – Present
- Website: https://www.cbcmusic.ca/programs/drive

Drive, formerly known as Radio 2 Drive, is the afternoon program on the CBC Music radio network in Canada, launched September 2, 2008.

On air from 3:30 to 7:00 pm, it is hosted by Rich Terfry, also known as Buck 65. The program airs a "mix of current singer-songwriters, roots and urban music". It was a major change for Radio 2, which had previously focused on classical music and jazz.
