= Nothing Is Cool =

Studio album by Mcenroe and Birdapres
- Released: November 16, 2004
- Recorded: 2003-August 2004
- Studios: South Slope Rhythm Repair (Vancouver, British Columbia, Canada)
- Genre: Hip-hop
- Length: 56:07
- Label: Peanuts & Corn Records
- Producers: Mcenroe; Birdapres

Nothing Is Cool is a collaborative studio album by Canadian rappers Mcenroe and Birdapres. It was released by Peanuts & Corn Records on November 16, 2004. The album was produced by Mcenroe, with co-production from Birdapres. It features guest appearances from John Smith and Stace Prints.

== Critical reception ==
Professional ratings
Review scores
Source	Rating
Cokemachineglow	82%
Christgau's Consumer Guide	A
HipHopCore	4/5 stars
Now	3/5 Ns
Pitchfork	5.1/10
Tiny Mix Tapes	3.5/5 marks
Tom Hull – on the Web	A-

Thomas Quinlan of Exclaim! called it one of the best hip-hop albums of the year, and one of the best Peanuts & Corn releases.

Martin Turenne of The Georgia Straight called it "one of the finest local hip-hop outings in recent memory, packed with keen-eyed social commentary that is biting without being bitter".

The album was ranked number thirteen in Robert Christgau's year-end Pazz & Jop list. Chuck Eddy named it one of the 150 best albums of 2004.

In his 2022 book Bedroom Rapper, Cadence Weapon said "The title track from Nothing Is Cool might be the watermark for the entire Peanuts & Corn discography, a withering takedown of the transient nature of coolness over a mesmerizingly filtered sample and rolling drum break."

== Track listing ==
No.	Title	Length
1.	"5000 Watts"	3:44
2.	"Break Merchant"	4:03
3.	"Grumpy Old Men"	5:22
4.	"Nothing Is Cool"	4:23
5.	"Broke Beat"	3:49
6.	"Party People"	3:47
7.	"Bad Actor"	3:16
8.	"Family Business"	4:23
9.	"The Worst Person"	3:54
10.	"A Little Bitter" (featuring John Smith)	3:54
11.	"South Slope" (featuring Stace Prints)	3:34
12.	"Wanted To Cooperate"	4:11
13.	"Supposed"	3:58
14.	"F*@k You 2K3"	3:49
Total length:		56:07

- All scratches by Hunnicutt
