= Kamau =

Kamau is a male name of Kenyan origin that may refer to: It is primarily a masculine name in the Kikuyu, belonging to the Bantu group who migrated from the Congo region. The name was given to a group of young men who went through initiation together. The group was called Rika. The initiation process involved circumcision, training and mentoring to help transition from childhood to manhood. The young men in the group would take up their initiation group's name as a given name (Ritwa ria Rika) as a form of association, but would still keep their original name. Thus the man's original name may be Wambugu, but he may choose to use his Rika name Kamau. As a result, men usually had two or three names (Given/birth name, Initiation name and Nickname).

Though the tradition is not practiced, the name is passed on through the naming system in a family from the ancestor who had received the name through the initiation to the next generation. As a result it is now used as a birth/given name inherited from a relative and to many it has become a family name.

- Bruce Kamau, Kenyan-born Australian footballer
- Gibson Kamau Kuria, Kenyan lawyer and human rights activist
- Daniel Kamau, Kenyan writer
- Ian Kamau, Canadian hip hop and spoken word artist
- James Maina Kamau, Kenyan politician from Nairobi County
- Jamleck Irungu Kamau, Kenyan politician from Murang'a County
- Johnstone Kamau Ngengi, birth name of Jomo Kenyatta, first Kenya president.
- Kamau Brathwaite, poet and writer from Barbados
- KAMAUU, American singer and rapper
- Michael Kamau, Kenyan cabinet secretary for Transport and Infrastructure
- Sammy Henia-Kamau (born 2006), Kenyan footballer
- Sammy Douglas Waweru Kamau, Kenyan politician
- W. Kamau Bell, American stand-up comic
