= Odario Williams =

Canadian musician and broadcaster

Odario Williams is a Canadian musician and broadcaster; he is currently the host of the weekday evening program Afterdark and the weekly CBC Music Live on CBC Music. In addition to Afterdark, Williams makes regular appearances on CBC Radio One's Q. Prior to that, he had guest-hosted Radio 2's The Signal and was the voice of CBC Radio 3. He was born in Guyana, and raised in Winnipeg, Manitoba. In addition to his work in radio, Williams is an actor, live DJ, model, and frontman for the Toronto hip hop collective Grand Analog. He was previously in the Winnipeg hip-hop group Mood Ruff.

He co-hosted the Juno Awards of 2020 alongside Damhnait Doyle.
