= This Right Here Is Buck 65 =

Compilation album by Buck 65
- Released: January 25, 2005
- Genre: Hip hop
- Length: 46:54
- Label: V2
- Producer: Buck 65; Charles Austin; Graeme Campbell

Buck 65 chronology
Talkin' Honky Blues (2003)	This Right Here Is Buck 65 (2005)	Secret House Against the World (2005)

This Right Here Is Buck 65 is a compilation album by Canadian hip hop musician Buck 65. It was released on V2 Records in 2005.

== Critical reception ==
Professional ratings
Aggregate scores
Source	Rating
Metacritic	85/100
Review scores
Source	Rating
AllMusic	4/5 stars
Alternative Press	4/5
Blender	4/5 stars
Entertainment Weekly	A−
Pitchfork	7.0/10
PopMatters	9/10
Rolling Stone	3/5 stars
Slant Magazine	3/5 stars
Spin	A−
The Village Voice	A−

At Metacritic, which assigns a weighted average score out of 100 to reviews from mainstream critics, the album received an average score of 85, based on 14 reviews, indicating "universal acclaim".

Suzanne Ely of Entertainment Weekly gave the album a grade of "A−", commenting that "this oddly captivating country-rap hybrid of an album suggests we're entering a new frontier in hip-hop, with Buck as the foremost pioneer." Matthew Murphy of Pitchfork gave the album a 7.0 out of 10, writing, "though the album probably serves as an accurate snapshot of his headspace at one fixed point in time, the mercurial nature of Buck's talents have fated this to seem as yet another transitional work."

== Track listing ==
No.	Title	Length
1.	"Bandits"	3:22
2.	"B. Sc."	2:41
3.	"Cries a Girl"	4:51
4.	"Wicked and Weird"	3:47
5.	"Centaur"	3:24
6.	"Roses and Bluejays"	3:16
7.	"Out of Focus"	2:26
8.	"Talking Fishing Blues"	3:04
9.	"463"	3:46
10.	"Pants on Fire"	5:11
11.	"Phil"	3:20
12.	"Craftsmanship"	4:07
13.	"The Abandoned Cars of Inverness County (El Dorado)" (hidden track)	2:45

== Personnel ==
Credits adapted from liner notes.

- Buck 65 – vocals, turntables, production
- Andrew Glencross – keyboards
- Dale Murray – pedal steel guitar
- Charles Austin – guitar, instruments, production, recording, engineering, mixing
- Graeme Campbell – keyboards, sequencer, programming, effects, edits, production, recording, engineering, mixing
- Michael Catano – drums, recording assistance, engineering assistance
- J. LaPointe – mixing (9)
- Bernie Grundman – mastering
