= Farm Fresh (band) =

1990s Canadian hip hop group

- Origin: Brandon, Manitoba, Canada
- Genre: Hip-hop
- Years active: 1994–1996, 2005
- Label: Peanuts & Corn Records
- Members: mcenroe Pip Skid; DJ Hunnicutt

Farm Fresh was a Canadian hip hop group from Brandon, Manitoba made up of mcenroe, Pip Skid and DJ Hunnicutt.

== History ==
Farm Fresh first came together in 1991. They later moved to Winnipeg, and in 1994 released their first recording The Space EP. This was followed by a full-length album named Crazy Friction in 1995.

Soon after, the group stopped developing new material. They released a compact disc called Played Out, containing previous recordings and a few unreleased songs, in 1996. The band also appeared on Rheostatics' album The Nightlines Sessions, collaborating with that band on an improvised live track called "Trans Jam".

Farm Fresh reunited for an anniversary album named Time Is Running Out, which was released in March 2005. The album was recorded in a basement studio in Brandon.

All of their albums have been released on Peanuts & Corn Records, a label founded and operated by Mcenroe.
