= Laundromat Boogie =

Studio album by Buck 65
- Released: September 29, 2014
- Recorded: 2014
- Genre: Hip hop
- Label: Bandcamp
- Producer: Jorun Bombay

Buck 65 chronology
| 20 Odd Years (2011) | Laundromat Boogie (2014) | Neverlove (2014) |

Laundromat Boogie is an album by Canadian hip-hop musician Buck 65. It was released on September 29, 2014, through the Bandcamp page of producer Jorun Bombay.

The album was released one day before Buck 65's label album Neverlove, and was inspired by a desire to make a lighthearted, fun album to balance the heavier, more emotional themes of Neverlove. All of its songs allude to the process of doing laundry in a laundromat as a metaphor for love and sex.

The album was not widely publicized in advance of its release, although Buck 65 posted to his Facebook page in May 2014 that he was working on an album project that he hoped to release simultaneously with Neverlove.

== Track listing ==
1. "So Fresh"
2. "Laundromat Boogie"
3. "Spin Cycle"
4. "A Million Little Pieces"
5. "Dirty Books"
6. "Soap & Water (Stet Parody)"
7. "So Dirty"
8. "Clean Sheets"
9. "Dirt Can't Hide from Buck 65"
10. "Laundry Together"
11. "Spin Cycle (Reprise)"
