= It Snowed =

Studio album by Meaghan Smith
- Released: November 1, 2011
- Genre: Folk, Christmas
- Label: Warner Music Canada, Nettwerk
- Producer: Graeme Campbell, Charles Austin, Wizardz of Oz, Meaghan Smith

Meaghan Smith chronology
The Cricket's Orchestra (2009)	It Snowed (2011)	Have a Heart (2014)

It Snowed is a 2011 Christmas album by a Canadian singer-songwriter Meaghan Smith. It was released on November 1, 2011.

== Track listing ==
1. Breakable
2. Silver Bells
3. Baby, It's Cold Outside (with Buck 65)
4. It Snowed
5. Christmas Time Is Here
6. Christmas Kiss
7. Little Drummer Boy
8. Zat U Santa Claus?
9. Silent Night
