= Shad (rapper) =

Canadian rapper and broadcaster (born 1982)

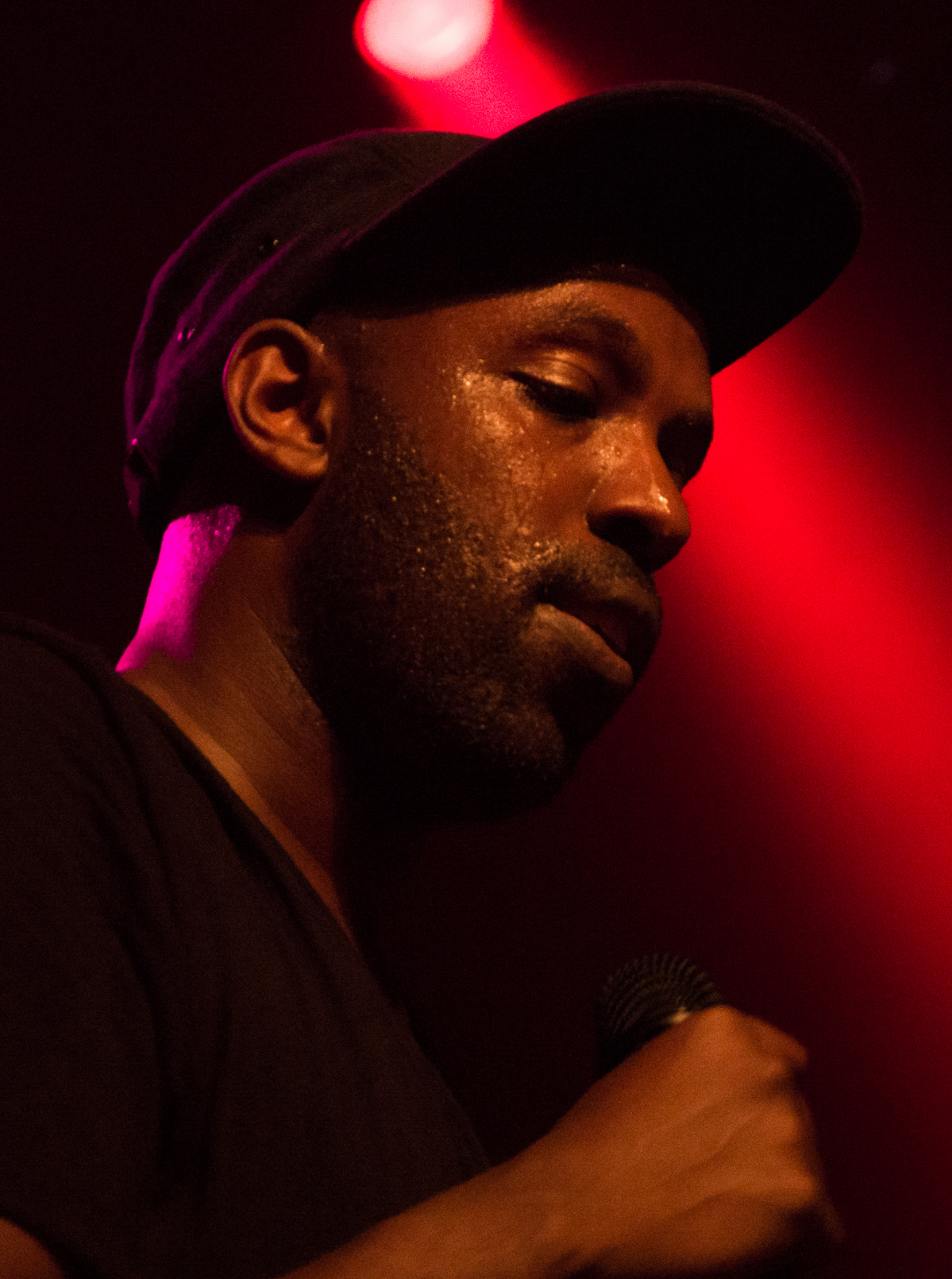

Background information
- Also known as: Shad K Your Boy Tony Braxton
- Born: Shadrach Kabango; July 18, 1982 (age 44); Kenya
- Origin: London, Ontario, Canada
- Genre: Alternative hip-hop
- Occupations: Rapper; songwriter; broadcaster
- Years active: 2005–present
- Labels: Black Box Music; Decon; Duck Down; Secret City
- Website: shadk.com

Shadrach Kabango (born July 18, 1982), known professionally as Shad or Shad K, is a Canadian rapper and broadcaster. Beginning his career in 2005, has released seven studio albums and three extended plays. He won a Juno Award for Rap Recording of the Year in 2011 and five of his albums have been shortlisted for the Polaris Music Prize, the most short-list nominations of any artist in the prize's history. In 2013, CBC Music named Shad the second-greatest Canadian rapper of all time. Shad hosted Q on CBC Radio One from 2015 to 2016, and hosts the International Emmy and Peabody Award-winning documentary series Hip-Hop Evolution on HBO Canada and Netflix.

== Early life ==
Born in Kenya to Rwandan parents, Shad was raised in London, Ontario. His mother worked as a lab technologist in a London hospital and his father was a machinist. He attended London Central Secondary School.

== Music career ==
While an undergraduate student at Wilfrid Laurier University, Shad won $17,500 from 91.5 The Beat's Rhythm of the Future talent competition. He was entered in the radio contest by his sister. The prize money was used to finance his self-released debut album When This Is Over (2005). The album was recognized for Shad's honest lyrics and focus on social causes—for example, the track "I'll Never Understand" examines the Rwandan genocide and includes poetry written by his mother Bernadette Kabango.

In 2007, Shad was signed by Black Box Recordings for a three-album deal and released his second album, The Old Prince. The album was supported by four singles, most prominently "The Old Prince Still Lives at Home", with its accompanying viral music video. In 2008, The Old Prince received a Juno Award nomination for Rap Recording of the Year and was a short-list nominee for the 2008 Polaris Music Prize. The music video for the single "The Old Prince Still Lives at Home" was nominated for two MuchMusic Video Awards in 2008.

Shad released his third album, TSOL, in 2010. TSOL was a short-list nominee for the 2010 Polaris Music Prize, the video for the song "Rose Garden" received a nomination for a 2011 MuchMusic Video Award, and the album won the Juno Award for Rap Recording of the Year at the 2011 Juno Awards. On beating out Canadian compatriot Drake for the Juno, Shad said in an interview: "I did not think for a second that I would win. Not for one second. He's massive. He's massive in the States, he's massive in Canada."

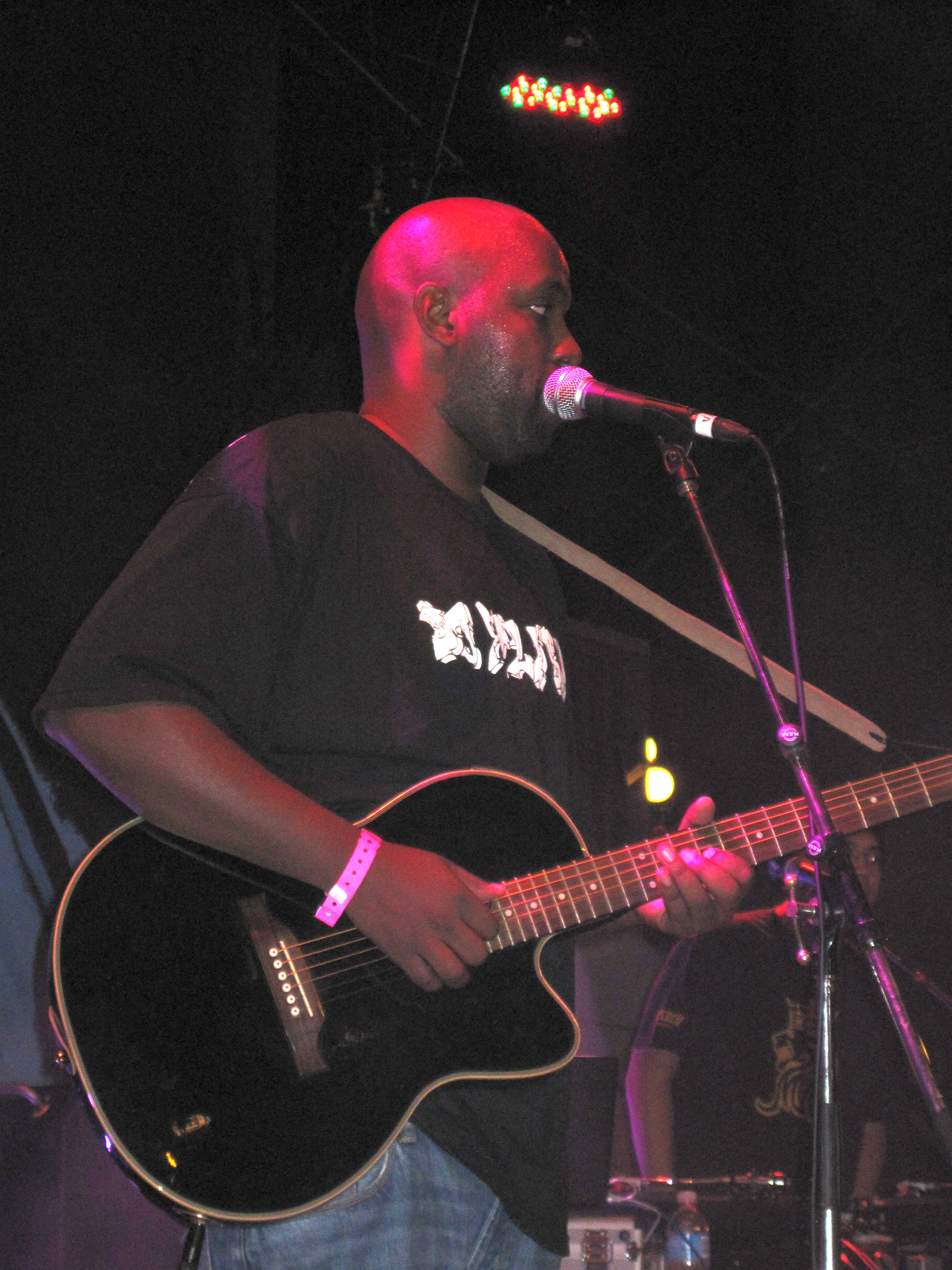
Shad performing in 2009

In 2012, Shad released the EP "Melancholy and the Infinite Shadness" and in June 2013, he released a collaborative EP with Skratch Bastid entitled The Spring Up. Shad's fourth album, Flying Colours, was released on October 15, 2013. This album was nominated for the Juno Award for Rap Recording of the Year in 2014, and was a short-list nominee for the 2014 Polaris Music Prize. In December 2014, Shad released a collaborative EP with DJ T. LO entitled "Boarding Pass".

In 2016, he released a 90s-influenced soft-rock album, Adult Contempt, under the pseudonym Your Boy Tony Braxton. The alter ego was based on "the idea of a dude named Tony Braxton who likes to sing (but obviously isn't as good as the famous Toni Braxton)." Musically, the album was inspired by Michael Penn, Terence Trent D'arby, The Cure, Bryan Adams, and Janet Jackson.

In the same year, Shad collaborated with Tanya Tagaq on "Centre", a track from her album Retribution, and also recorded for Homeboy Sandman, Skratch Bastid, and A Tribe Called Red (on We Are the Halluci Nation).

In July 2018, Shad released the lead single, "The Fool Pt 1 (Get It Got It Good)" from his new album, A Short Story About a War. Two follow-up singles, "The Fool Pt. 3 (Frame of Mind)" and "The Stone Throwers (Gone in a Blink)", were released in prior to the album's release. The album was released in October 2018 on Secret City Records and included collaborations with Lido Pimienta, Kaytranada, Ian Kamau, Eternia, and Yukon Blonde. A Short Story About a War is a concept album, which explores the same war from multiple perspectives. The album was short-listed for the 2019 Polaris Music Prize, marking Shad's 4th Polaris short-list nomination.

In April 2020, Shad indicated he was working on finishing a new album. He also was featured on Tobi's "24 (Toronto Remix)" and its corresponding music video, along with Haviah Mighty, Jazz Cartier, and Ejji Smith.

In April 2021, Shad released the single "Out of Touch", featuring pHoenix Pagliacci, followed by the single "Work", featuring Skratch Bastid, the next month. In June 2021, Shad announced his new album, TAO, would be released October 1, 2021. He also released the song "Storm", which featured pHoenix Pagliacci and George Elliott Clarke. On July 14, 2022, TAO was short-listed for the 2022 Polaris Music Prize. In July 2025, it was announced that his new album, Start Anew would be released on October 31, 2025. The album contains 13 songs, including the singles "Bars and BBQs", "K.I.S.S.", "Islands" and "Slanted".

Start Anew was longlisted for the 2026 Polaris Music Prize.

== Television and radio work ==
=== Q (2015–2016) ===
In March 2015, it was announced that Shad would replace Jian Ghomeshi as host of CBC Radio One's Q. In August 2016, the CBC announced that he would be replaced by Tom Power.

=== Hip Hop Evolution (2016–present) ===
In the four-part documentary series Hip-Hop Evolution, Shad interviewed multiple noted hip-hop and rap artists to explore the origins of this music genre. This documentary was featured in 2016 Hot Docs Canadian International Documentary Festival and shown on HBO Canada On December 2, 2016 Netflix released the series internationally. The series went on to be one of the 2016 Peabody Award winners and won an International Emmy Award for Best Arts Programming in 2017. On October 19, 2018 Netflix released a second season of the series and a third season was released on September 6, 2019. Hip Hop Evolution's fourth season was released on January 17, 2020.

== Musical style and influences ==
Shad is described as a "conscious" and "reflective" rapper, known for his witty lyrics on heartfelt subjects. Shad has stated that he was influenced by the artists that he listened to in high school, such as Common, Lauryn Hill, Eminem, The Roots, Notorious B.I.G., and Outkast.

== Personal life ==
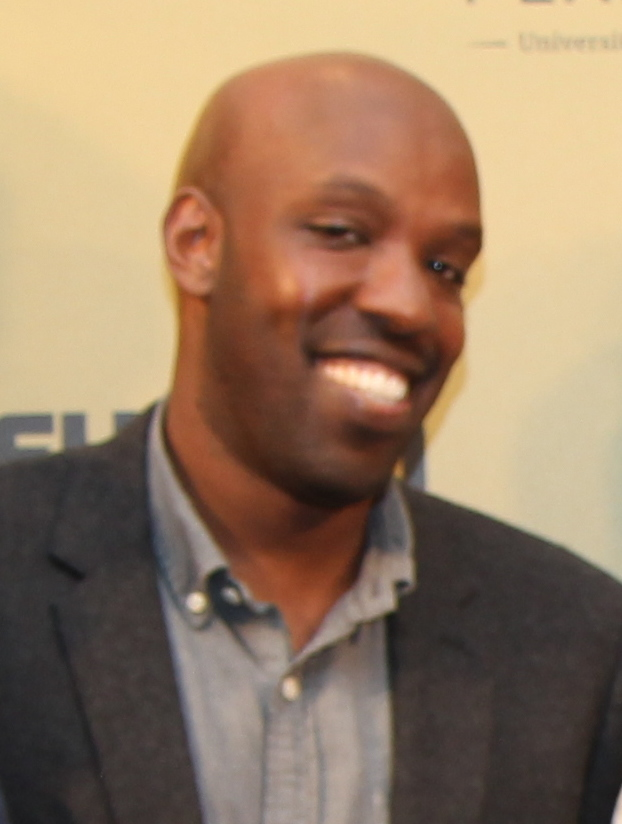
Shad in 2017

Shad is bilingual, speaking English and French. He holds a business degree from Wilfrid Laurier University and a master's degree in liberal studies from Simon Fraser University. Shad and his wife married in 2016; they have two daughters.

== Discography ==
=== Studio albums ===
- When This Is Over (2005)
- The Old Prince (2007)
- TSOL (2010)
- Flying Colours (2013)
- A Short Story About a War (2018)
- TAO (2021)
- Start Anew (2025)

=== EPs ===
- Two Songs (2011) (with Dallas Green)
- Melancholy and the Infinite Shadness (2012)
- The Spring Up (2013) (with Skratch Bastid)
- Holy Shad (2014) (with Holy Fuck)
- Boarding Pass (2014) (with DJ T.LO)
- Reel Speakers (2024) (with 14KT)

=== Singles ===
- "I Don't Like To" (2008)
- "Brother (Watching)" (2008)
- "The Old Prince Still Lives at Home" (2008)
- "Compromise" (2009)
- "Yaa I Get It" (2010)
- "Rose Garden" (2010)
- "We, Myself and I" (2010)
- "Keep Shining" (2011)
- "Give You All I Can" (2011)
- "It Ain't Over" (2012)
- "Stylin'" (2013)
- "Fam Jam (Fe Sum Immigrins)" (2013)
- "The Fool Pt 1 (Get it Got it Good)" (2018)
- "The Fool Pt. 3 (Frame of Mind)" (2018)
- "The Stone Throwers (Gone In a Blink)" (2018)
- "Out of Touch" feat. Phoenix Pagliacci (2021)

=== Guest appearances ===
- Promise – "Shy Guy" from More Than Music (2008)
- Hey Ocean! – "Vagabond" from It's Easier to Be Somebody Else (2008)
- Blue Scholars – "The Dawn Song" from Bayani: Redux (2009)
- Grand Analog – "Electric City" from Metropolis Is Burning (2009)
- Classified – "Loonie" from Self Explanatory (2009)
- Wax Romeo and Smalltown DJs – "Boom Ha" (2010)
- Dirty Circus – "Into the Sun" from Alive and Well (2010)
- Mike Tompkins – "Only Girl" (2010)
- Lights – "Everybody Breaks a Glass" and "Flux and Flow" from Siberia (2011)
- Blitz the Ambassador – "Native Sun" from Native Sun (2011)
- The Slakadeliqs – "Beneath It All" from The Other Side of Tomorrow (2012)
- Lushlife – "Gymnopedie 1.2" from Plateau Vision (2012)
- k-os – "Spraying My Pen" from Black on Blonde (2013)
- Mr. J. Medeiros – "Pale Blue Dot" 20Syl Remix" (2013)
- The Procussions – "Today" from The Procussions (2013)
- Grand Analog – "The Great Rhyme Dropper" from Modern Thunder (2013)
- Said the Whale – "Resolutions" from Hawaiii (2013)
- Def3 – "The Truth" from Wildlif3 (2014)
- k-os – "Boyz II Men" from Can't Fly Without Gravity (2015)
- Homeboy Sandman – "Earth, Wind, Fire" from Kindness for Weakness (2016)
- Skratch Bastid – "Limoncello" (2016)
- A Tribe Called Red – "How I Feel" from We Are the Halluci Nation (2016)
- Tanya Tagaq – "Centre" from Retribution (2016)
- Paul Chin – "Take Two" from Full Spectrum (2020)
- Tobi – "24 (Toronto Remix)" from Still+ (2020)
- Haviah Mighty – “Imagine That” (2022)
- Anomalie – “Generations” from “Galleries”
- Snotty Nose Rez Kids – “Red Sky At Night (Remix)” (2022)
