= Mcenroe (rapper) =

Canadian rapper

mcenroe
- Also known as: Roddy Rod; bigmcenroe
- Born: Rod Bailey
- Origin: Brandon, Manitoba, Canada
- Genre: Hip-hop
- Occupations: Rapper; songwriter; record producer; record exucutive; video director
- Years active: 1994–present
- Formerly of: Farm Fresh

Rod Bailey, better known by his stage name Mcenroe (stylized in all lowercase), is a Canadian rapper, record producer and video director from Brandon, Manitoba, Canada. He is the founder of the independent hip-hop record label Peanuts & Corn Records, which also operated as an independent distributor, as well as a company specializing in the marketing and promotion of independent music in Canada, Breadwinner Music Group.

== Career ==
Under the stage name Roddy Rod, he was a member of the hip-hop group Farm Fresh with Pip Skid and DJ Hunnicut. He founded Peanuts & Corn in Brandon, Manitoba in 1994, and through it produced the group's first recording. He then moved his studio and label to Winnipeg, where he continued to write, perform and produce in the hip hop scene.

He has released several solo albums, including Disenfranchised in 2003. In the following year, Disenfranchised and the mcenroe-produced album, Funny Farm by Pip Skid, both received nominations for Outstanding Rap/Hip-Hop Recording at the Western Canadian Music Awards. During the recording of his 2004 collaborative album Nothing Is Cool with Birdapres, mcenroe took a musical as well as production part. He later moved to Vancouver.

He directed multiple music videos for Moka Only, including "Grab Grab Grab" and "Rock On" from Airport 5 in 2011, and "Sleeping Dogs" from Airport 6 in 2012.

In 2013, mcenroe was interviewed about the hip-hop music industry in Canada for the documentary film Hip Hop Eh.

In 2021 he released an autobiographical style album titled Brandon, alongside a podcast of the same name. According to Billboard, "Brandon is described as a musical scrapbook, compiling memories of being a teenager in the late '80s and early '90s in Manitoba's second-largest city."

== Discography ==
=== Solo albums ===
- Billy's Vision (2000)
- Disenfranchised (2003)
- 5 Years in the Factory (2004)
- Mastermind (2008)
- The Paper Champion (2010)
- Burnt Orange (2014)
- Pt 1 Penny Raps (2021)
- Brandon (2021)
- Procrastination Street (2025)

=== Solo EPs ===
- The Ethics (1998)
- The Convenience (2002)
- Working in the Factory (2004)
- Hello.World (2014)
- And The Bad Sleep Well (2015)

=== Collaborations ===
Farm Fresh

- The Space EP (1994)
- Crazy Fiction (1995)
- Played Out (1999)
- Time is Running Out (2005)

Park-Like Setting

- with Fermented Reptile - Split 12" (2000)
- School Day 2, Garbage Day 4 (2000)
- Craftsmen (2005)
- This, That, and the Third (2023)

Other collaborations

- with Break Bread - Break Bread EP (2004)
- with Birdapres - Nothing Is Cool (2004)
- with Pip Skid - Disenfranchised 2 / Funny Farm 2 (2005)
- with Alvaro Rojas - Noodles (2022)

=== Production credits ===
- Aberfoyle Springs Compilation
- Different Shades of Black - Next School Pioneers
- Fermented Reptile - Let's Just Call You "Quits"
- Fishin' In Troubled Waters - Fishin' In Troubled Waters
- Frek Sho - Kingpin 12"
- Gruf the Druid - Druidry
- Gruf the Druid - Hopeless
- Hip Hop Wieners - All Beef, No Chicken
- Ink Operated - Ink Operated Presents
- Ismaila - Just Stretching
- Ismaila - Mark of the Zebra
- John Smith - High Arctics
- John Smith - Blunderbus (or, In Transit)
- John Smith - Pinky's Laundromat
- John Smith - Smithtape Vol. 1: Foxhunting
- Josh Martinez - Buck Up, Princess
- Mood Ruff - Fluid
- Mood Ruff - night.life.types
- Mood Ruff - Maxim
- Pip Skid - Money Matters 7"
- Pip Skid - Friends4Ever
- Pip Skid - Funny Farm
- Pip Skid - I'm Mean
- Peanuts & Corn - Factory Seconds
- Peanuts & Corn - Fall 2003
- Peanuts & Corn - Spring 2001
- Peanuts & Corn - Summer 2002
- Peanuts & Corn - Tape Hiss (1993-97)
- Roddy Rod - Emissions
- Satchel Paige - Guy I'm From Here
- Shadez Ov Black - Comprehension
- Stace Prints - Soulivar
- Taking Care of Business - Taking Care of Business 12"
- Yy - Hold The Fort Down
