= The Old Prince =

Studio album by Shad
- Released: October 23, 2007
- Genre: Canadian hip hop
- Length: 40:26
- Label: Black Box Recordings
- Producer: Rel McCoy, Shad, Slakah the Beatchild, AMiracle, Beatdock Saints, Jewbei, Ed, Stringz, Mantis, Mad Scientist, Michael Tompkins, Ric Notes,

Shad chronology
When This Is Over (2005)	The Old Prince (2007)	TSOL (2010)

Professional ratings
Review scores
Source	Rating
Okayplayer	4/5 stars
RapReviews	(10/10)
Robert Christgau	(2-star Honorable Mention)

The Old Prince is the second studio album by Canadian rapper Shad. It contains 13 tracks and it was released on October 23, 2007 via Black Box Recordings. On June 30, 2009 it was re-released on iTunes on the same label.

== Singles ==
Videos have been made for four tracks from the album, "I Don't Like To", "Brother (Watching)", "Compromise" and "The Old Prince Still Lives At Home". The video for "The Old Prince Still Lives at Home", a spoof of the opening credits to the television series The Fresh Prince of Bel Air, won CBC Radio 3's 2008 Bucky Award for Best Video.

== Award nominations ==
- The album was nominated for Rap Recording of the Year at the 2008 Juno Awards.
- The album was nominated for the 2008 Polaris Music Prize.

== Track listing ==
No.	Title	Producer	Length
1.	"Intro: Quest for Glory"	Mad Scientist	2:15
2.	"I Don't Like To"	Mantis	3:01
3.	"What We All Want" (featuring Kamau and Rel McCoy)	Beatdock Saints	2:57
4.	"Brother (Watching)" (featuring B and F. Kabango)	AMiracle	3:36
5.	"Now A Daze"	Slakah the Beatchild	2:20
6.	"The Old Prince Still Lives At Home"	Ed	3:33
7.	"Out of Love Pt.2"	Rel McCoy	3:24
8.	"The Last Three Years (Interlude)"	S. Kabango, I. Koiter, Scott Kelly, D. Morgan	2:34
9.	"I Heard You Had a Voice Like an Angel / Psalm 137"	Stringz, S. Kabango	5:24
10.	"Compromise"	Jewbei	3:15
11.	"Exile"	S. Kabango, M. Johnston, D. Jung	3:25
12.	"Get Up"	Ric Notes	3:57
13.	"Outro" (featuring Kamau)	I. Koiter	0:50
