= When This Is Over =

Studio album by Shad
- Released: June 10, 2005
- Recorded: Ottawa, ON and Toronto, ON
- Genre: Canadian hip hop

Shad chronology
| When This Is Over (2005) | The Old Prince (2007) |

Professional ratings
Review scores
| Source | Rating |
|---|---|
| RapReviews | (8.5/10) |
| Sputnikmusic | 4.5/5 stars |

When This Is Over is the debut studio album by Canadian rapper Shad, released in 2005. The album was financed by $17,500 Shad won from 91.5 The Beat's Rhythm of the Future talent competition while completing his final year of undergraduate study at Wilfrid Laurier University.

The album features ten tracks that cover topics ranging from the Rwandan genocide to race in basketball.

== Track listing ==
1. "New School Leaders"
2. "I Get Down"
3. "Out of Love"
4. "I'll Never Understand" (featuring Bernadette Kabango)
5. "Rock to It"
6. "The Greatest Construction Crew"
7. "Question Marks"
8. "Real Game" (featuring B Green)
9. "Wild"
10. "A Story No One Told"
