= Talkin' Honky Blues =

Studio album by Buck 65
- Released: November 4, 2003
- Genres: Hip hop, country
- Length: 57:14
- Label: WEA
- Producer: The Entity

Buck 65 chronology
Square (2002)	Talkin' Honky Blues (2003)	This Right Here Is Buck 65 (2005)

Singles from Talkin' Honky Blues
- 1. "Wicked and Weird" Released: 2003; 2. "463" Released: 2004; 3. "Sore" Released: 2004

Talkin' Honky Blues is a studio album by Canadian hip hop musician Buck 65. It was released on WEA in 2003. The album won the 2004 Juno Award for Alternative Album of the Year.

== Critical reception ==
Professional ratings
Review scores
Source	Rating
AllMusic	4/5 stars
Canoe.ca	favorable
Christgau's Consumer Guide	A
Drowned in Sound	6/10
Exclaim!	favorable
The Guardian	4/5 stars
Hot Press	4.5/5
Hour Community	4.5/5 stars
Pitchfork	7.6/10
Vice	favorable

Sean Carruthers of AllMusic gave the album 4 stars out of 5, saying: "Instead of jazzy or funky backing tracks, most of the tracks here crib heavily from country, which is where the 'honky' comes in: this is the sort of thing that Buck 65 grew up with and what influenced him." He described it as "a beat poetry album with hip hop beats." Rollie Pemberton of Pitchfork gave the album a 7.6 out of 10, saying, "[Buck 65] has discovered a happy medium between folk and rap, turning his initial disdain for the lack of innovation in hip-hop into a more diverse sound." Terry Sawyer of PopMatters named it the best album of 2003.

In 2005, Jason Richards of Now called it "[Buck 65's] most accessible album". In 2007, Dan Weiss of Stylus Magazine placed it at number 6 on the "Top 10 Alt-Country Greats Not Recorded by Uncle Tupelo" list. In 2014, Brad Casey of Vice called it "a culmination of his best work to that date" and a "career high".

== Track listing ==
No.	Title	Length
1.	"Leftfielder"	2:32
2.	"Wicked and Weird"	3:43
3.	"Riverbed 1"	1:48
4.	"Sore"	4:20
5.	"Protest"	2:51
6.	"Riverbed 2"	2:51
7.	"Exes"	2:51
8.	"Roses and Bluejays"	3:16
9.	"Riverbed 3"	4:04
10.	"50 Gallon Drum"	4:35
11.	"Riverbed 4"	4:27
12.	"463"	4:27
13.	"Riverbed 5"	1:24
14.	"Killed by a Horse"	3:32
15.	"Riverbed 6"	0:45
16.	"Tired Out"	3:30
17.	"Craftsmanship"	4:07
18.	"Riverbed 7"	2:16

== Personnel ==
Credits adapted from liner notes.

- Buck 65 – lyrics, beats, turntables, recording, mixing
- Graeme Campbell – MIDI, other computer stuff, recording, mixing
- Charles Austin – guitar, stringed things, recording, mixing
- Dale Murray – pedal steel guitar
- Andrew Glencross – keyboards
- Michael Catano – drums
- Bob Ludwig – mastering
- Jenn McIntyre – art direction, design, illustration
- Ingram Barss – photography
- Jenn McIntyre – photography
- Patrick Duffy – layout
- Jenn Hirst – A&R
- Steve Blair – A&R

== Charts ==
Chart	Peak position
French Albums (SNEP)	148
