= Peanuts & Corn Records =

Canadian independent record label

- Founded: 1994
- Founder: Rod Bailey
- Genre: Hip-hop
- Country of origin: Canada
- Location: Vancouver, British Columbia

Peanuts & Corn is a Canadian independent record label, releasing hip hop recordings since 1994. They have also been a distributor of Canadian hip hop releases since 2002.

== History ==
Peanuts & Corn was founded in Brandon, Manitoba by Rod Bailey, stage name mcenroe. The first recording to be produced under the label was The Space EP, created by mcenroe's group, Farm Fresh in 1994.

The label has since relocated first Winnipeg, Manitoba, and later Vancouver, British Columbia, where it is now based. One of the most actively involved artists at Peanuts & Corn has been Pip Skid, who has also gone by the name of Wicked Nut. In 2004, mcenroe and Birdapres released the album Nothing Is Cool.

By 2004 Peanuts & Corn, along with its sister company Breadwinner Music Group, was producing and releasing tracks and albums for a number of artists in the Canadian hip-hop scene. As of 2010 there had been about 40 releases on Peanuts & Corn, and more on affiliated and subsidiary labels throughout Canada and internationally.

== Legacy ==
The label has been praised by multiple Canadian hip-hop musicians, including Cadence Weapon, Factor Chandelier and Skratch Bastid. Factor Chandelier said "Growing up in Saskatoon I aways looked up to P&C. They had a distinct sound and a distinct look with every project, which was dope and ahead of its time." Skratch Bastid stated "It was really impressive to see a movement like that coming out of Canada. Almost like a No Limit or Cash Money-style stable of rotating artists. P&C gave a voice to the prairies, which was largely underrepresented on the Canadian rap spectrum."

== Artists with releases on P&C ==
- mcenroe
- Pip Skid
- John Smith
- Gruf the Druid
- DJ Hunnicutt
- Birdapres
- Yy
- The Gallivanting Spoof
- DJ Moves
- Fermented Reptile (Gruf the Druid, and Wicked Nut)
- Park-Like Setting (DJ Hunnicutt, mcenroe, and John Smith)
- Farm Fresh (DJ Hunnicutt, mcenroe, and Wicked Nut)
- Break Bread (mcenroe, Pipi Skid, John Smith, Gruf, DJ Hunnicutt and Yy)

== P&C imprints and affiliations ==
- Camobear Records
- Clothes Horse Records
- First Things First
- Foultone Records
- Frek Sho
- Fried Chicken Productions
- Futility Records
- Goodnight Musics
- Hand'Solo Records
- Low Pressure Productions
- Plague Language Records
- Sound Barrier Recordings
- Your Brother Records

== See also ==
- List of record labels
