= Bike for Three! =

Hip hop group

- Genres: Alternative hip hop Underground hip hop Glitch
- Years active: 2007-present
- Labels: Anticon; Fake Four Inc.
- Members: Buck 65; Greetings from Tuskan

Bike for Three! is a "cross-continental collaboration" between Canadian alternative hip hop artist Buck 65 (born Rich Terfry) and Belgian producer Greetings from Tuskan (born Joëlle Phuong Minh Lê).

== History ==
Their debut album, More Heart Than Brains, was released on Anticon in 2009.

While Buck 65 and Greetings from Tuskan have ongoing solo efforts, they say the band "should not be thought of as a side-project," and the album "NOT a one-off affair." Though the two have never met in person, they have been making music since 2007 after meeting through MySpace, and the album has been "finished" since June 2008. The album marks the first time that a Buck 65 album features completely electronic production.

Their second album, So Much Forever, was released on Fake Four Inc. on February 11, 2014.

== Discography ==
- More Heart Than Brains (Anticon, 2009)
- So Much Forever (Fake Four Inc., 2014)
