= Synesthesia (Buck 65 album) =

Studio album by Buck 65
- Released: 2001
- Genre: Hip hop
- Length: 45:11
- Label: Endemik Music, WEA
- Producer: Buck 65

Buck 65 chronology
Man Overboard (2001)	Synesthesia (2001)	Square (2002)

Alternative covers
- 2002 re-release cover

Professional ratings
Review scores
Source	Rating
The New Rolling Stone Album Guide	3.5/5 stars
UKHH.com	mixed

Synesthesia is a studio album by Canadian hip hop musician Buck 65. It was originally released on Endemik Music in 2001 and then re-released with additional songs and music on WEA in 2002.

== Track listing ==
Endemik Music release (2001)
No.	Title	Length
1.	Untitled	38:17

WEA re-release (2002)
No.	Title	Length
1.	"Skill Saw"	1:53
2.	"Attack of the Nerds"	3:24
3.	"Hot Lunch"	1:33
4.	"I Die Every Night"	1:23
5.	"While I'm Young"	3:50
6.	"Make-Out Song"	3:11
7.	"Hens"	2:35
8.	"'65 Buick"	3:03
9.	"Mouth Wash"	1:37
10.	"The Tracks by Pentz Lake"	1:06
11.	"Poop and Pee"	3:50
12.	"Hollow"	1:40
13.	"Rat's Ass/Customs"	3:39
14.	"Toxic Constituents"	1:48
15.	"Grumpy"	4:28
16.	"Confidence in the System/Centaur (Remix)"	3:25
17.	"Nerds (Remix)"	2:50
