= Flying Colours (Shad album) =

Studio album by Shad
- Released: 15 October 2013
- Genre: Canadian hip hop
- Length: 51:44
- Label: Black Box
- Producer: Ric Notes, Shad, Skratch Bastid, I. K. Koiter, Tone Mason, Michael Tompkins, That Brotha Lokey, Rel McCoy

Shad chronology
TSOL (2010)	Flying Colours (2013)	Adult Contempt (2016)

Flying Colours is the fourth studio album by Canadian rapper Shad, released in Canada on 15 October 2013.

The album was a shortlisted nominee for the 2014 Polaris Music Prize.

== Reception ==
Professional ratings
Review scores
Source	Rating
Exclaim!	(7/10)
NOW	5/5 Ns
The Varsity	favorable

Flying Colours garnered generally positive reviews from music critics. Tabassum Siddiqui of NOW gave high praise to the versatile production and lyrical delivery made throughout the album, concluding that "the result is a record that fully reveals all of Shad's musical colours." Jacob Lorinc of The Varsity praised the lyrical content for tackling socio-political topics without coming across as obvious and trite when going for positivity, saying that "Although he is still an underdog in the world of hip-hop, Shad’s clever rhymes and intricately woven verses throughout Flying Colours show the rapper’s ability to cover all sorts of ground on this album." Aaron Matthews of Exclaim! said that despite some out-of-place tracks, he praised the album for its vast use of different genres and instruments, and Shad's continued growth as a mature rapper, calling it "a wake-up call to anyone sleeping on Canadian rappers and Shad's coming for the crown next time." Flying Colours was named the 49th best Canadian album of the 2010s, by Exclaim!.

== Track listing ==
No.	Title	Writer(s)	Producer	Length
1.	"Intro: Lost" (featuring Lisa Lobsinger, Kamau, and k-os)	Ric Notes, Ian Kamau, k-os, Shad	Ric Notes	4:37
2.	"Yall Know Me" (featuring Ebrahim)	Ian Koiter, Shad	Committee (Shad, Skratch Bastid, and I. K. Koiter)	3:25
3.	"Fam Jam (Fe Sum Immigrins)"	Skratch Bastid, Shad	Skratch Bastid	3:33
4.	"He Say She Say"	Shad	Committee	3:50
5.	"Dreams"	Max Zipursky, Michael Tompkins, Shad	Committee	3:18
6.	"Interlude: Grace"			0:59
7.	"Stylin" (featuring Saukrates)	Max Zipursky, Skratch Bastid, Shad	Skratch Bastid	3:51
8.	"Progress (Part 1: American Pie, Part 2: The Future Is Here)"	Part 1: Tone Mason, Ian Koiter, Shad. Part 2: Shad	Tone Mason	7:08
9.	"Remember to Remember" (featuring Lights)	Michael Tompkins, Lights, Shad	Michael Tompkins	4:36
10.	"Love Means" (featuring Eternia)	Lokey, Eternia, Matthew Johnston, Shad	That Brotha Lokey	4:45
11.	"Thank You"	Ric Notes, Shad	Ric Notes	4:47
12.	"Epilogue: Long Jawn"	Rel McCoy, Shad	Rel McCoy	6:58

== Personnel ==
Adapted from the Flying Colours liner notes.

- Bryden Baird – trumpets
- Trent Reschney – saxophones
- Sebastian Ostertag – cello
- Allison Stewart – viola
- Tanya Charles – violin
- Ian Koiter – string arrangements, bass, keyboards, synths, acoustic guitar
- Max Zipursky – synths, pianos
- Michael Libis – acoustic guitar, electric guitar
- Shad – electric guitar
- Skratch Bastid – drum programming
- Andrew Hootsalack – drum programming
- Jahmal Tonge – live drums
- Ayo Leilani – additional vocals
- Elijah Walsh – engineer
- Crispin Day – engineer
- Rob Stefanson – engineer
- Elisa Pangseng – engineer
- Michael Tompkins – engineer
- Dan Weston – mixer
- Tom Coyne – mastering
- Justin Broadbent – album art, photography

== Charts ==
Chart	Peak position
Heatseekers Albums	36
