= Vertex (album) =

Studio album by Buck 65
- Released: 1997
- Genre: Hip hop
- Length: 63:21
- Labels: Four Ways to Rock, Metaforensics, WEA
- Producer: Buck 65

Buck 65 chronology
Language Arts (1996)	Vertex (1997)	Man Overboard (2001)

Vertex is a studio album by Canadian hip hop musician Buck 65.

== Critical reception ==
Professional ratings
Review scores
Source	Rating
AllMusic	4/5 stars
The New Rolling Stone Album Guide	3.5/5 stars
Stylus Magazine	A−

Mark Pytlik of AllMusic called Vertex "an inadvertent paean to the possibilities of imagination and innovation."

== Track listing ==
No.	Title	Length
1.	"Sounds from the Back of the Bus"	4:04
2.	"The Centaur"	2:30
3.	"Driftwood"	3:04
4.	"Jaws of Life"	4:33
5.	"The Blues, Pt. 1"	3:08
6.	"On All Fours"	4:21
7.	"Slow Drama"	3:39
8.	"Sleep Apnoea"	3:39
9.	"Brown Truck"	3:00
10.	"In Every Dream House There Is a Heartache"	5:37
11.	"The Blues, Pt. 2"	1:30
12.	"Memory Is Parallax"	4:17
13.	"To Say the Very Least"	3:06
14.	"Works of Light"	3:35
15.	"Supper at Sundown"	2:13
16.	"Bachelor of Science"	2:46
17.	"The Blues, Pt. 3"	3:52
18.	"Style # 386"	2:40
