= Square (album) =

Studio album by Buck 65
- Released: October 8, 2002
- Genre: Hip hop
- Length: 60:45
- Label: WEA
- Producer: Buck 65

Buck 65 chronology
| Synesthesia (2002) | Square (2002) | Talkin' Honky Blues (2003) |

Square is a studio album by Canadian hip hop musician Buck 65. It was released on WEA in 2002. Although it consists of four tracks, each track consists of multiple songs. The album was nominated for the 2003 Juno Awards for Alternative Album of the Year and Album Design of the Year.

== Critical reception ==
Professional ratings
Review scores
| Source | Rating |
|---|---|
| Christgau's Consumer Guide | A− |
| Pitchfork | 7.0/10 |
| Stylus Magazine | B+ |
| The New Rolling Stone Album Guide | 4/5 stars |
| Tiny Mix Tapes | 4.5/5 marks |

Rollie Pemberton of Pitchfork gave the album a 7.0 out of 10, describing it as "a melodic mix of folk rock sensibility, smooth early 90s style production, clever lyrical observations and a relatively enjoyable train ride into the mental station of Halifax's best-known emcee." Meanwhile, Clay Jarvis of Stylus Magazine gave the album a grade of B+, saying, "Square is built solely out of his strengths: hazy introspection, sparse snare-and-kick beats and simple, dismal instrumental refrains."

== Track listing ==
| No. | Title | Length |
|---|---|---|
| 1. | "Square One" | 16:00 |
| 2. | "Square Two" | 13:42 |
| 3. | "Square Three" | 17:08 |
| 4. | "Square Four" | 14:15 |

== Personnel ==
Credits adapted from liner notes.

- Buck 65 – words, beats, scratches
- Greymatter – helping hands
- Charles Austin – helping hands
- DJ Signify – helping hands
- Jorun – helping hands
- Yan – helping hands
- James Paterson – cover art, design
- Robbie Cameron – cover art, design
