= Stan Sanders =

American baseball player and coach (born 1939)

Biographical details
- Born: August 12, 1939 (age 87); Philadelphia, Pennsylvania, U.S.

Playing career
- 1960: Johnson City Phillies
- 1960: Elmira Pioneers

Coaching career (HC unless noted)
- c. 1961: Miami Dade (assistant)
- c. 1965: Miami (FL) (assistant)
- 1966–1969: Ohio (assistant)
- 1970–1981: Toledo
- 1983–1992: Toledo

Administrative career (AD unless noted)
- 1982: New York Yankees (scout)

Head coaching record
- Overall: 534–447

Stan Sanders (born Stanley Cocciolone on August 12, 1939) is an American former baseball player and coach. He served as the head baseball coach at the University of Toledo from 1970 to 1981 and again from 1983 to 1992, compiling a record of 534–447. He spent 1982 as a scout for the New York Yankees of Major League Baseball.

Sanders was born on August 12, 1939, in Philadelphia, Pennsylvania, and attended high school in Miami, Florida, where he was a childhood friend of Skip Bertman.
