= Sammy Douglas Waweru Kamau =

Kenyan member of parliament

Sammy Douglas Waweru Kamau is a Kenyan politician. He has served as a Member of Parliament for the Ol Kalou Constituency in Kenya since he won the parliamentary by-election held on 16 July 2026.

== Early life and education ==
Kamau began his education at Aglow Junior School, where he completed his primary education and sat for the KCPE examination in 1998. He then joined Utumishi Boys High School, completing his secondary education and sitting for the KCSE examination in 2002. He later pursued higher education at the University of Nairobi, where he earned a Bachelor's degree in Agricultural Economics.

== Political career ==
Kamau began his political career in 2013, when he was elected as the first Member of the County Assembly (MCA) for Ol Kalou Ward on a TNA/DP ticket. In 2017, he sought re-election as an independent candidate following disagreements over party nominations, but narrowly lost the seat by fewer than 200 votes. He later shifted to national politics and, in the 2022 General Election, contested the Ol Kalou parliamentary seat on a UDA ticket, finishing second with approximately 19,380 votes, behind the late MP David Njuguna Kiaraho.

Kamau served as a Protocol Officer and Political Advisor in the Office of former Deputy President Rigathi Gachagua, a role he held until the period following Gachagua's impeachment. He later joined the DCP, where he served as the Nyandarua County Coordinator, helping to establish and strengthen party structures at the grassroots level. He will serve the remainder of the 13th Parliament until the next General Election, scheduled for August 2027.

The Ol Kalou parliamentary seat became vacant following the death of the incumbent, David Njuguna Kiaraho, in March 2026 after a short illness. In May 2026, Kamau won the Democracy for Citizens Party (DCP) nomination for the Ol Kalou parliamentary by-election, becoming the party's flag bearer. He won the by-election in July 2026.
