= James Maina Kamau =

Kenyan politician

James Maina Kamau is a Kenyan politician. He represented Kandara constituency as the Member of Parliament from 2007 to 2013, on a Party of National Unity (PNU) ticket. He is currently serving as the Deputy Governor of Murang'a County.
