= Buck 65 =

Canadian hip hop artist

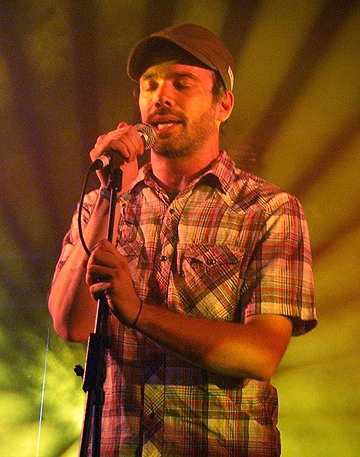
- Buck 65 at Truck Festival in July 2006

Background information
- Also known as: Rich Terfry, DJ Critical, Jesus Murphy, Johnny Rockwell, Stinkin' Rich, Uncle Climax, Dirk Thornton, Haslam
- Born: Richard Terfry; March 4, 1972 (age 54); Mount Uniacke, Nova Scotia, Canada
- Genres: Alternative hip hop; experimental; country; blues
- Occupations: Rapper; producer; DJ; radio host
- Instruments: Sampler; turntables
- Works: Buck 65 discography
- Years active: 1993–2015, 2020–present (as Buck 65); 1993–present (as Rich Terfry)
- Labels: Warner Music Canada; Strange Famous; Anticon; Murderecords; No Records; Hand'Solo
- Formerly of: Bike for Three!; Double Nice; Sebutones

Richard Terfry (born March 4, 1972), better known by his stage name Buck 65, is a Canadian alternative hip hop rapper. Underpinned by an extensive background in abstract hip hop, his more recent music has incorporated blues, country, rock, folk and avant-garde influences. He is also a radio host of the weekday Drive show on CBC Music since 2008.

== Career ==
=== Early career ===
Terfry was born in 1972 and raised in Mount Uniacke, Nova Scotia, a rural community 40 km north of Halifax. He was first exposed to rap music in the mid-1980s while listening to CBC Stereo's late-night show Brave New Waves, and then by listening to Halifax campus community radio station CKDU. At the time, CKDU only broadcast at 33 watts, so he had to climb a tree in his yard to hear the station's hip hop show on his radio. Fascinated by hip hop, the young Terfry taught himself how to rap, DJ, and, later, to produce records. In 1990, Terfry self-produced his first song, "The Rhyme Has To Be Good", which later received airplay on the Halifax college radio station.

In 1993, he began hosting a hip-hop show (as DJ Critical) on CKDU called The Bassment. The show was later renamed The Treatment Program, and he used the name Jesus Murphy. This period overlapped with many of his non-major-label releases.

=== Stage names ===
Buck 65 has used a number of other stage names; these include Johnny Rockwell, Stinkin' Rich, Haslam, and Uncle Climax. These pseudonyms typically represent different characters in his raps (Uncle Climax, Johnny Rockwell and Stinkin' Rich) or different aspects of Buck's creativity.

He explains the origin of his main performance name as follows: "I was born with the name Richard Terfry. Where I come from, it's common when a boy is named after his father, for the father to refer to the son as 'Buck'. I don't know where that comes from or when it started. It might be a 'out-in-the-country' thing. Growing up I knew lots of sons who were referred to as 'Buck'. Sometimes even if they weren't juniors. So the joke became, I was one of 65 (a number picked randomly) 'Bucks' in my town."

However, when appearing on Andy Kershaw's radio show in the UK on August 8, 2004, he gave a totally different explanation: some of his earliest public performances were with an older blues musician who used to joke that Terfry's regularity at showing up made him as reliable as a 1965 Buick. The nickname Buick 65 stuck until it was misprinted on a publicity poster as 'Buck 65' which he then adopted as his stage name.

Buck 65 has recorded an EP under the name of Dirk Thornton alongside Irishman DJ Flip; it was scheduled for release early 2007 but the date was not set. The first release under Dirk Thornton was a 7-inch vinyl single with the tracks "Yesterday's News" and "Catwalk."

=== Early releases ===
In 1993, he released his first cassette under the alias Stinkin' Rich, on the label No Records. The five song EP was titled Chin Music, which was a reference to his interest in baseball. The release brought Stinkin' Rich to the attention of members of Halifax alternative rock band Sloan. Sloan signed him to their independent record label Murderecords and released a 7-inch single and a full-length cassette called Game Tight, again featuring a reference to baseball. As Stinkin' Rich, he also appeared on numerous songs by Halifax hip hop band Hip Club Groove.

After a brief break, Terfry returned reconstituted as Buck 65, releasing Weirdo Magnet (on Metaforensics) and Language Arts in 1996, followed by Vertex in 1997 (both on Four Ways to Rock/Metaforensics), and the 12" single The Wildlife (on Hand'Solo Records) in 1998. He recorded "Sebutonedef" (released in 1996 by Funtrip Records) as a collaboration with fellow Halifax artist Sixtoo. Other releases by the duo, known as Sebutones, are Psoriasis and 50/50 Where It Counts. While still far from mainstream success, he received several odd jobs in Canada's entertainment industry, including making soundtrack music and narrating a TV commercial for NBA apparel, and providing lyrics for a song titled "Grocery Store Rap" on the children's program Sesame Street.

Man Overboard, originally released on Anticon in 2001, was a significant turning point in his career. The record, and the entire Anticon collective (of which Sixtoo was also a part), were considered hallmarks of a new avant-garde movement in underground hip hop. It was at this time that Buck met DJ Mr. Dibbs, who inducted him into the 1200 Hobos, a loosely knit hip-hop collective named for their proficiency in manipulating the Technics 1200 turntable. Also in 2001, Buck performed at the Snow Jam festival in 2001, and later that year, he released his next studio album, Synesthesia, on Endemik Records; the album was re-released the next year with a significantly different track listing on Warner Music Canada.

=== Major label releases ===
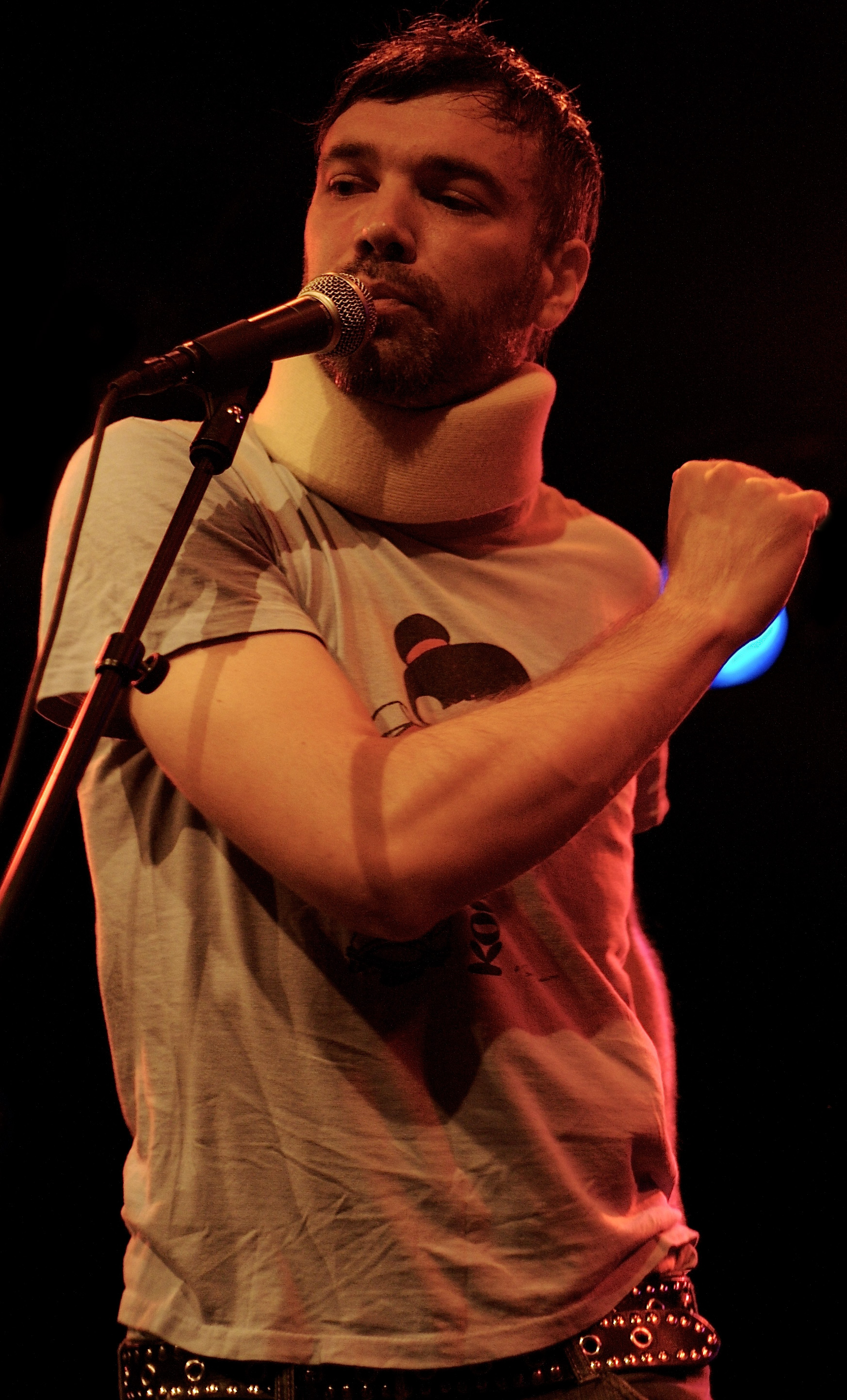
Buck 65 at Storsjöyran in Sweden in 2007

In 2002, Buck 65 signed a record deal with Warner Music Canada, which subsequently released much of his back catalogue, including Weirdo Magnet, Language Arts, Vertex, Man Overboard, and Synesthesia. During this time, he released two albums for the label, the first being Square in 2002, which was nominated for a Juno Award in 2003 for Alternative Album of the Year and Album Design of the Year. In 2003, Buck 65 released Talkin' Honky Blues, which saw a major stylistic shift in his music, incorporating elements of country music, folk, bluegrass, and electronica, amongst other musical styles; it later won the 2004 Juno Award for Alternative Album of the Year.

After a deal was signed with V2 Records in the United States, This Right Here Is Buck 65 was released in early 2005. The album is a compilation of previously released songs, re-recordings, and B-sides that was marketed as an introduction to his work for U.S. audiences. However, after V2 chose not to release his next effort, Secret House Against the World, the deal was amicably dissolved. Secret House Against the World was released in 2005 by Warner Music Canada, and saw Buck further experimenting with varying musical styles. He gained additional recognition when he co-hosted the Juno Awards of 2006 with Pamela Anderson, who kissed him on stage.

=== Radio work ===
Terfry was a host on CBC Radio 3's web radio in 2006 and 2007. He accepted the host role on CBC Radio 2's Radio 2 Drive beginning fall 2008. He continues to host Drive daily from 3pm to 6pm EST.

=== Dirty Work, Situation and Dirtbike ===
In late 2006, Buck 65 released a 5-song digital EP called Dirty Work. It was released over a month-long campaign, adding one song per week for free download via his website.

Buck 65 released the album Situation on October 30, 2007, on Strange Famous Records in the United States and Warner Music Group worldwide. The album is a concept album based around the year 1957, and is a return to a more "pure" hip hop sound than the previous blues, country and avant-garde influences in Secret House Against the World. It was produced by fellow Halifax DJ Skratch Bastid, aimed at making a "classic hip-hop record that pulses with joy and clarity of purpose". The album appeared on the Billboard Heatseekers Albums chart for one week at number 31.

He played with Symphony Nova Scotia in the Rebecca Cohn Auditorium on April 18, 2008.

In late 2008, Buck 65 released three one-track albums for free download. The three Dirtbike albums featured guest production and verses by Cadence Weapon, Emily Wells, D-Styles, Skratch Bastid, Serafina Steer, Jorun, Moka Only, Aupheus, Mia Clarke of Electrelane, Doseone among others. Dirtbike 1/3 signified a return to Buck 65's pre-Talkin' Honky Blues hip hop roots that was expected in Situation; in Buck 65's own words "it's a lot like the original versions of Vertex and Man Overboard."

In 2009, Buck 65 contributed "Blood Pt. 2" to the AIDS benefit album, Dark Was the Night, produced by the Red Hot Organization. It is a remix of Sufjan Stevens' take on the song "You Are the Blood", originally by Castanets.

Buck 65 formed Bike for Three! with Belgian producer Greetings from Tuskan (born Joëlle Phuong Minh Lê). Their debut album, More Heart Than Brains, was released on Anticon on May 26, 2009. The album features "sharp lyrical details and storytelling" by Buck 65, combined with Phuong Minh Lê's production creating an "exquisite, shimmering landscape that rarely plays by the rules."

=== 20 Odd Years, Neverlove, and Laundromat Boogie ===
On February 1, 2011, Buck 65 released 20 Odd Years, named in honor of his twentieth anniversary in the music industry. The album continued the tradition of combining several different musical styles, and featured many different guest collaborators. The album was preceded by a series of four EPs, released digitally and on 7" vinyl: 20 Odd Years, Vol. 1: Avant (released June 8, 2010); 20 Odd Years, Vol. 2: Distance (July 12, 2010); 20 Odd Years, Vol. 3: Albuquerque (August 10, 2010); and 20 Odd Years, Vol. 4: Cenotaph (September 14, 2010). The latter EP was withdrawn from availability, presumably due to copyright issues involving Buck's sampling of the Bronski Beat single, "Smalltown Boy." The album primarily featured songs from these EPs, including a cover of Leonard Cohen's "Who By Fire", as well as two previously unreleased songs. Buck 65 later released an additional EP in the series titled 20 Odd Years Vol. 4: Ostranenie (November 21, 2011).

Buck 65 released Neverlove on September 30, 2014. The album was inspired by his divorce from his ex-wife. One day before its release, he also released the more lighthearted, and previously unannounced, album Laundromat Boogie through producer Jorun Bombay's Bandcamp page. Prior to the release of Neverlove, a music video for the album track "Super Pretty Naughty" was to be premiered by Entertainment Tonight, but according to Buck 65 on his website, "...when they saw the video and heard the song, they banned it from their show for what they deemed to be objectionable visual and lyrical content."

=== Hiatus ===
Terfry released an autobiography Wicked and Weird: The amazing tales of Buck 65 in 2015.

Buck 65 played two shows with Symphony Nova Scotia on October 2 and 3, 2015 in Halifax, Nova Scotia, in one of his final appearances before an extended hiatus. He was unable to perform a scheduled DJ set at the CBC Music Festival in Toronto on May 28, 2016, due to last-minute technical difficulties.

Aside from a performance on July 10, 2018, at a tribute concert for the late Anticon Records co-founder Brendon Whitney aka Alias, Buck 65 was on a musical hiatus from October 2015 until early 2020.

=== Return to recording ===
In May 2020, Controller 7 released a new album, featuring Buck 65 on vocals and DJ scratches.

In the summer of 2021, he hosted Deep Dive on CBC Radio One on Saturday nights, which was a program playing classic pop music albums with Terfry giving background information on the albums.

He released a new album, King of Drums in 2022. Critic Robert Christgau put it at No. 7 on his 2022 Dean's List. That year also included collaboration albums with Tachichi (Flash Grenade) and Birdapres (The Last Dig).

Two Buck 65 albums were released in 2023: Super Dope, and Punk Rock B-Boy, both were listed in Robert Christgau's Dean's List for 2023 at No. 2 and No. 39, respectively.

=== Baseball ===
At the age of 16, Terfry was recognized by the former New York Yankees scout Stan Sanders, but his focus switched to music after a knee injury. Throughout his career, he has been outspoken about his baseball fandom in his lyrics and interviews. His favorite team is the Toronto Blue Jays. In 2011, he released a song titled "Joey Bats", a tribute to José Bautista, who played for the Blue Jays at the time. In 2014, he threw out a first pitch at Wrigley Field, home of the Chicago Cubs. In 2015, he was featured on a Topps trading card, in their Allen & Ginter set.

== Discography ==
Buck 65

- Year Zero (1996)
- Weirdo Magnet (1996)
- Language Arts (1996)
- Vertex (1997)
- Man Overboard (2001)
- Synesthesia (2001)
- Square (2002)
- Talkin' Honky Blues (2003)
- Secret House Against the World (2005)
- Strong Arm (2006)
- Situation (2007)
- Dirtbike 1-3 (2008)
- 20 Odd Years (2011)
- Laundromat Boogie (2014)
- Neverlove (2014)
- Dirtbike 4 (2015)
- King Of Drums (2022)
- Super Dope! (2023)
- Punk Rock B-Boy (2023)
- Keep Moving (2025)
- Do Not Bend (2026)

Stinkin' Rich (pre-Buck 65 name)

- Chin Music (1993)
- Game Tight (1995)
- Weirdo Magnet (Original version) (1996)

Sebutones (Buck 65 with Sixtoo)

- Psoriasis (1996)
- 50/50 Where It Counts (1997)

with Greymatter

- Johnny Rockwell Meets Henry Krinkle (1998)

Bike for Three! (Buck 65 with Greetings from Tuskan)

- More Heart Than Brains (2009)
- So Much Forever (2014)

with Controller 7

- Tommy and Richie present "Billy" (2020)

Double Nice (Buck 65 with Birdapres)

- The Last Dig (2022)

with Tachichi

- Flash Grenade (2022)

== Awards and nominations ==
- 2003: Square – Nomination for the Juno Award for Alternative Album of the Year
- 2004: Talkin' Honky Blues – Winner of the Juno Award for Alternative Album of the Year
- 2005: Nomination for the Juno Award for Songwriter of the Year
- 2006: "Devil's Eyes" – Winner of the Juno Award for Video of the Year
- 2011: "What's Wrong With That?" from the film Year of the Carnivore – Nomination for the Genie Award for Achievement in Music – Original Song

== Book ==
- Wicked and weird: The amazing tales of Buck 65, Doubleday Canada, 2015
