= More Heart Than Brains =

Studio album by Bike for Three!
- Released: May 26, 2009
- Genres: Alternative hip hop, electronica
- Length: 49:23
- Label: Anticon
- Producer: Greetings from Tuskan

Bike for Three! chronology
More Heart Than Brains (2009)	So Much Forever (2014)

Professional ratings
Aggregate scores
Source	Rating
Metacritic	(82/100)
Review scores
Source	Rating
AllMusic	3.5/5 stars
Drowned in Sound	(8/10)
Pitchfork Media	(7.5/10)
Planet Sound	(8/10)
Robert Christgau	(1-star Honorable Mention)

More Heart Than Brains is the debut album by Bike for Three!, a collaboration between Canadian alternative hip hop artist Buck 65 (born Rich Terfry) and Belgian electronica producer Greetings from Tuskan (born Joëlle Phuong Minh Lê). It was released on May 26, 2009 on Anticon.

During the recording process, the two never met face-to-face.

== Reception ==
At Metacritic, which assigns a weighted average score out of 100 to reviews from mainstream critics, the album received an average score of 82% based on 5 reviews, indicating "universal acclaim".

Pitchfork Media rated the album 7.5 out of 10, praising Terfry's "sharp lyrical details and storytelling" and calling Phuong Minh Lê's production "exquisite, shimmering landscape that rarely plays by the rules." XLR8R magazine called the track "All There is to Say About Love" "impressive", with "sharp rhymes falling over 8-bit-style electronics."

== Track listing ==
No.	Title	Length
1.	"Beginning"	1:08
2.	"All There Is to Say About Love"	3:57
3.	"Lazarus Phenomenon"	2:46
4.	"Nightdriving"	3:32
5.	"There Is Only One of Us"	3:03
6.	"No Idea How"	4:17
7.	"Always I Will Miss You. Always You."	3:20
8.	"The Departure"	3:28
9.	"First Embrace"	3:36
10.	"Can Feel Love (Anymore)"	4:06
11.	"One More Time Forever"	3:38
12.	"MC Space"	3:14
13.	"Let's Never Meet"	3:50
14.	"More Heart Than Brains"	3:37
15.	"Ending"	1:48
