= Secret House Against the World =

Studio album by Buck 65
- Released: July 26, 2005
- Genres: Hip hop; avant-pop
- Length: 48:32
- Label: WEA
- Producers: Graeme Campbell, Charles Austin, Buck 65

Buck 65 chronology
This Right Here Is Buck 65 (2005)	Secret House Against the World (2005)	Strong Arm (2006)

Singles from Secret House Against the World
- 1. "Kennedy Killed the Hat" Released: 2005; 2. "Devil's Eyes" Released: 2006

Secret House Against the World is a studio album by Canadian hip hop musician Buck 65. It was released on WEA in 2005. The album features contributions from Tortoise, Gonzales, D-Styles, and Tim Rutili, among others.

== Critical reception ==
Professional ratings
Aggregate scores
Source	Rating
Metacritic	71/100
Review scores
Source	Rating
Christgau's Consumer Guide	B+
Drowned in Sound	8/10
The Guardian	3/5 stars
Hot Press	4/10
Pitchfork	6.8/10
Playlouder	4.5/5 stars

At Metacritic, which assigns a weighted average score out of 100 to reviews from mainstream critics, Secret House Against the World received an average score of 71% based on 11 reviews, indicating "generally favorable reviews".

Mike Diver of Drowned in Sound gave the album an 8 out of 10, saying, "[Secret House Against the World's] obvious appeal lies entirely with its musical, or rather compositional, diversity." He added: "There's so much to love here that the personal-preference flotsam can be forgotten, allowed to drift away into a realm of listener ignorance. Sam Ubl of Pitchfork gave the album a 6.8 out of 10, saying: "In the past Buck seemed unsure of how to spit over his most country-flavored beats; here he's completely at ease." Meanwhile, Phil Udell of Hot Press gave the album a 4 out of 10, calling it "an incredibly difficult one to relate to or even enjoy."

The Wire listed the album on the "2005 Rewind" list.

== Track listing ==
No.	Title	Lyrics	Music	Length
1.	"Rough House Blues"	Buck 65	Charles Austin, Graeme Campbell, Buck 65	2:27
2.	"Devil's Eyes"	Rick of the Skins	Rick of the Skins	3:04
3.	"Le 65isme"	Buck 65	John Herndon, Buck 65	3:49
4.	"The Suffering Machine"	Buck 65	Buck 65	4:25
5.	"Surrender to Strangeness"	Buck 65	Buck 65	3:57
6.	"Kennedy Killed the Hat"	Buck 65	Buck 65	2:11
7.	"The Floor"	Charles Bukowski, Buck 65	Charles Austin, Graeme Campbell, Buck 65	3:29
8.	"Blood of a Young Wolf"	Buck 65	Buck 65	5:25
9.	"Drunk Without Drinking"	Buck 65	Buck 65	4:43
10.	"Blanc-Bec"	Buck 65	Buck 65	3:26
11.	"Corrugated Tin Facade"	Buck 65	Buck 65	4:14
12.	"Drawing Curtains"	Buck 65	Charles Austin, Graeme Campbell, Buck 65	3:57
13.	"Devil's Eyes (Piano Version)"	Rick of the Skins	Rick of the Skins	3:26

== Charts ==
Chart performance
Chart (2005)	Peak position
Canadian Albums (Nielsen SoundScan)	86
French Albums (SNEP)	180
