= 20 Odd Years =

Studio album by Buck 65
- Released: February 1, 2011
- Recorded: 2010
- Genre: Hip hop
- Label: WEA
- Producers: Charles Austin, Buck 65, Graeme Campbell, Emily Wells

Buck 65 chronology
Situation (2007)	20 Odd Years (2011)	Neverlove (2014)

20 Odd Years is an album by Canadian hip-hop musician Buck 65. It was released on February 1, 2011, and named in honor of his twentieth anniversary in the music industry. The album continued Buck 65's tradition of combining several different musical styles, and featured many different guest collaborators.

== Critical reception ==
Professional ratings
Review scores
Source	Rating
CHARTattack	4/5 stars
MSN Music (Expert Witness)	A−
PopMatters	(7/10)
Postmedia News	4/5 stars
Toronto Star	2.5/4 stars

20 Odd Years has received critical acclaim. Ross Langager of PopMatters gave it a seven out of 10 rating and called it "uneven but dynamic", complimenting Buck 65's "mix of subcultural influences" as "a dizzying, post-modern, multicultural stew". In consumer guide for MSN Music, critic Robert Christgau gave 20 Odd Years an A− rating, noting "Superstars Don't Love" and "Zombie Delight" as highlights, and commented that "Beholden to nobody's scene or purist myths, the Halifax-spawned, Toronto-based, Paris-savvy cult rapper makes beats his way—drum tracks of course, this is hip-hop like it or not, but with whatever on top, which here comes down to mostly female collaborators whose sonics subsume their considerable verbal input".

The album was named as a longlisted nominee for the 2011 Polaris Music Prize.

== Track listing ==
1. "Superstars Don't Love"
2. "Gee Whiz" (ft. Nick Thorburn)
3. "Whispers of the Waves" (ft. Gord Downie)
4. "Paper Airplane" (ft. Jenn Grant)
5. "Stop" (ft. Hannah Georgas)
6. "Zombie Delight"
7. "Tears of Your Heart" (ft. Olivia Ruiz)
8. "Cold Steel Drum" (ft. Jenn Grant)
9. "Who By Fire" (ft. Jenn Grant)
10. "She Said Yes"
11. "BCC" (ft. John Southworth)
12. "Lights Out"
13. "Final Approach" (ft. Marie-Pierre Arthur)

Produced by Charles Austin, Buck 65, Graeme Campbell and Emily Wells.

== 20 Odd Years EPs ==
The album was preceded by a series of four EPs, released digitally and on 7" vinyl: 20 Odd Years, Vol. 1: Avant (released June 8, 2010); 20 Odd Years, Vol. 2: Distance (July 12, 2010); 20 Odd Years, Vol. 3: Albuquerque (August 10, 2010); and 20 Odd Years, Vol. 4: Cenotaph (September 14, 2010). The latter EP was withdrawn from availability, presumably due to copyright issues involving the unauthorized sampling of the Bronski Beat single, "Smalltown Boy." The album primarily featured songs from these EPs, including a cover of Leonard Cohen's "Who By Fire", as well as two previously unreleased songs. Buck 65 later released an additional EP in the series titled 20 Odd Years Vol. 4: Ostranenie (November 21, 2011).

=== 20 Odd Years, Vol. 1: Avant ===
1. "Gee Whiz" (feat. Nick Thorburn)
2. "Who By Fire" (feat. Jenn Grant)
3. "Superstars Don't Love"
4. "Red Eyed Son"

=== 20 Odd Years, Vol. 2: Distance ===
1. "BCC" (feat. John Southworth)
2. "Paper Airplane" (feat. Jenn Grant)
3. "The Niceness"
4. "Tears In Space"

=== 20 Odd Years, Vol. 3: Albuquerque ===
1. "Final Approach" (feat. Marie-Pierre Arthur)
2. "Cold Steel Drum" (feat. Jenn Grant)
3. "Lights Out"
4. "Zombie Delight"

=== 20 Odd Years, Vol. 4: Cenotaph ===
1. "Smalltown Boy" (feat. Gentleman Reg)
2. "She Said Yes"
3. "Tears of Your Heart" (feat. Olivia Ruiz)

=== 20 Odd Years, Vol. 4: Ostranenie ===
1. "Days Go By" (feat. Jenn Grant)
2. "Dolores" (feat. Marnie Herald)
3. "Joey Bats"
4. "Legendary"
