= Meaghan Smith =

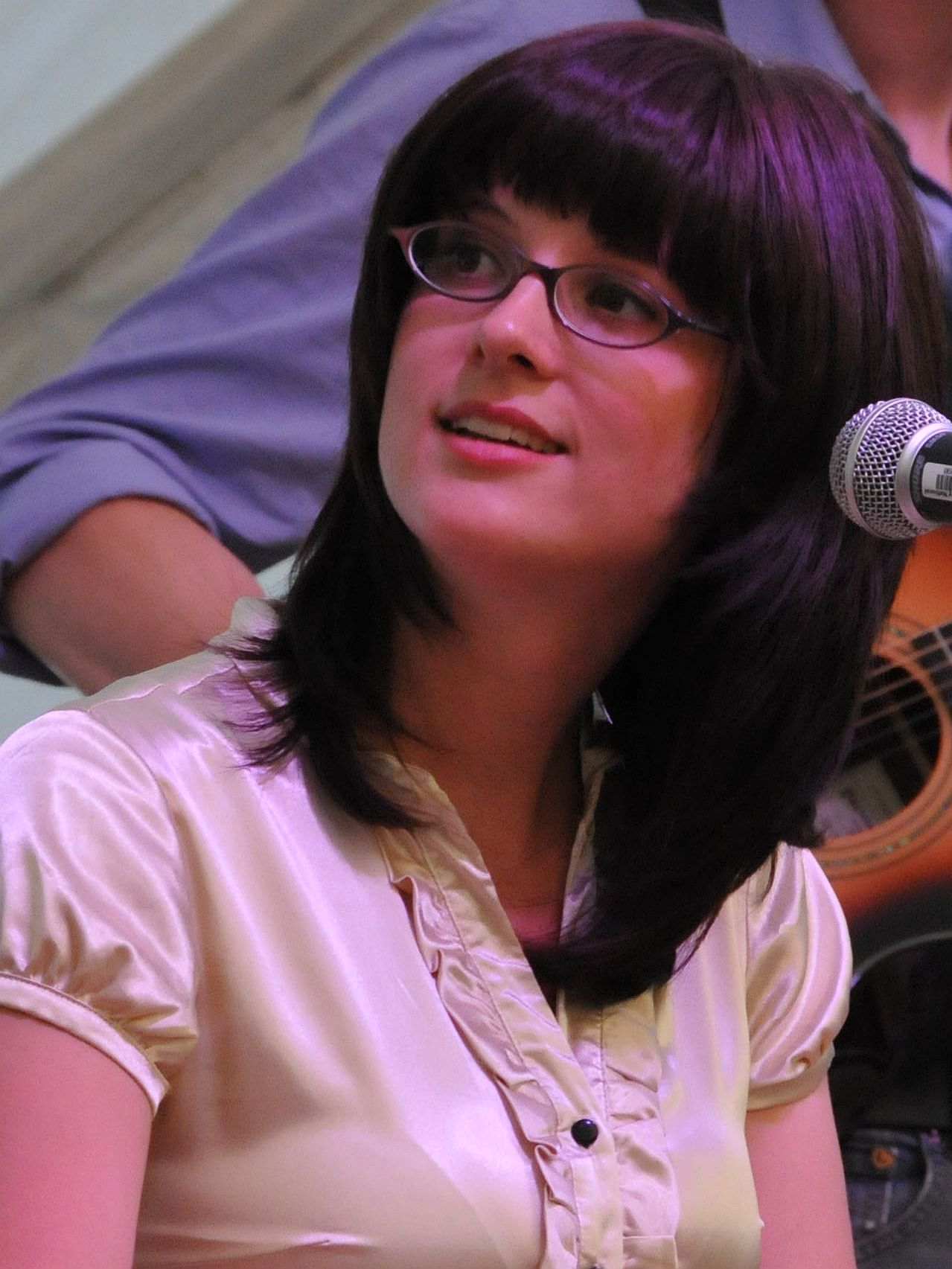
- Meaghan Smith in August 2008

Background information
- Origin: London, Ontario, Canada
- Genres: Pop; Folk
- Occupation: Singer-songwriter
- Years active: 2000s–present
- Labels: Warner Music Canada, Sire
- Website: www.meaghansmith.com

Meaghan Smith is a Canadian singer-songwriter, musician and visual artist. Her independently produced debut album, The Cricket's Orchestra, was released by Warner Music Canada-Sire Records in 2009. That same year, Smith also received attention for contributing a cover of the Pixies song "Here Comes Your Man" to the soundtrack of the film (500) Days of Summer. The recording featured Smith playing an Omnichord.

Smith has been acclaimed for her Christmas concerts, which feature interpretations of traditional carols as well as the songwriter's own popular yuletide composition, "It Snowed". In recent years, Smith has performed her songs with Canadian orchestras, including the Regina Symphony Orchestra, Thunder Bay Symphony Orchestra and Symphony Nova Scotia. At these shows and almost all others, Smith is joined onstage by accompanist and husband, Jason Mingo.

At the 2011 Juno Awards, Smith won in the Best New Artist category. Her most recent album, Have A Heart, was released on April 22, 2014. The video for the album's lead single won Video of the Year at the 2015 East Coast Music Awards.

== Life and career ==
Smith grew up in London, Ontario, and is one of four sisters born to musician parents. Self-taught to play piano and guitar, Smith also studied visual art throughout her primary, secondary and post-secondary school career, ultimately graduating from Sheridan College's animation program.

Smith began playing free stages while in college, and upon relocating to Canada's east coast, started to pursue music more seriously. Her first collection of original songs - the folk-rock recording Lost With Directions - was released in 2004. In 2005, Smith married her partner-accompanist Jason Mingo, a Nova Scotia-based songwriter-musician-producer-engineer. The two subsequently toured in support of Smith's career.

In 2008, Smith signed a recording deal with Warner Canada. She has released three full-length albums on the label to date - her jazz-folk début effort, The Cricket's Orchestra (2009), the Christmas-themed, It Snowed (2011) and the pop-flavoured set, Have A Heart (2014).

Two EP-length recordings - The Cricket's Quartet (2008) and Wish Upon a Star (2009) - were also released during this period, as was Smith's rendition of the Pixies song "Here Comes Your Man", which was included on the (500) Days of Summer soundtrack (2009).

== Musical artistry ==
=== Influences ===
Smith has cited a wide range of musical influences on her work. These include popular standards from the first half of the 20th century, Motown, modern electronic, sample and loop-based composition, the work of eclectic pop artists like Björk and Ellie Goulding, alt-rockers the Pixies, and contemporary Canadian musicians like Sarah Mclachlan, kd lang, Jane Siberry and Leslie Feist.

=== Musical style ===
The sound of The Cricket's Orchestra (2009) was dubbed 'modern vintage' by Smith, an aesthetic blending early 20th century jazz, swing band, country and folk music with contemporary electronic and club textures. Smith cited the song "A Little Love" as an example of the arrangements on the record. The song combines the turntable work of Canadian DJ Kid Koala with dramatic strings scored by producer Les Cooper.

Smith made a conscious departure from her earlier sound with Have A Heart (2014), a recording she called "very pop". The change in approach reflected Smith's desire to reinvent herself artistically, and overcome the creative anxiety she felt following her 2011 Juno win. Have A Heart recasts the jazz, folk and baroque character of Smith's earlier work in a modern popular music context that Popdose reviewer Jeff Giles described as "designed to challenge her audience's expectations - and test her own artistic boundaries - without sacrificing her original appeal."

=== Lyrical style ===
Smith's lyrics are autobiographical, inspired by romantic and familial relationships. In a review for The Cricket's Orchestra, New York Times music critic Jon Pareles opined that Smith's songs are "wry and retro, with wordplay harking back to Tin Pan Alley's heyday."

== Other creative endeavors ==
=== Visual art ===
Smith is a graduate of Sheridan College's animation program. Prior to her music career, she was an animator on Poko, a Canadian children's program produced by Halifax Film (DHX Media) between 2003-2006. As a youth, Smith attended Lester B. Pearson School for the Arts and Bealart in London ON where she was trained in illustration, painting and other forms of visual self-expression. A gallery on the website Meaghan Makes features samples of Smith's commissioned and sold art pieces.

=== Writing ===
In December 2015, Smith self-published her first ebook, 'How To Have A Heart (In 25 Not So Easy Steps)'. The memoir recounts the circumstances surrounding the creation and release of her 2014 recording Have A Heart.

== Discography ==
=== Studio albums ===
Title	Album details	Peak chart positions		Certifications (sales thresholds)
Title	Album details	CAN	US Heat	Certifications (sales thresholds)
Lost With Directions	Released: 2004; Label: Self - release (no label); Format: CD	—	—	—
The Cricket's Orchestra	Released: October 2, 2009; Label: Warner Music Group; Format: CD, digital download	—	29	—
It Snowed	Released: November 1, 2011; Label: Warner Music Canada; Format: CD, digital download	—	—	—
Have a Heart	Released: April 22, 2014; Label: Warner Music Canada; Format: CD, digital download	73	—	—

=== Singles ===
List of singles as lead artist, with selected chart positions and certifications, showing year released and album name
Title	Year	Peak chart positions			Certifications	Album
Title	Year	CAN	CAN AC	CAN HAC	Certifications	Album
"Five More Minutes"	2008	—	—	—	—	The Cricket's Orchestra
"Drifted Apart"/"A Little Love"	2008	—	—	—	—	The Cricket's Orchestra
"A Piece For You"	2009	—	—	—	—	The Cricket's Orchestra
"If You Asked Me"/"I Know"	2010	—	—	—	—	The Cricket's Orchestra
"Heartbroken"	2011	—	—	—	—	The Cricket's Orchestra
"Have a Heart"	2014	94	14	26	—	Have a Heart
