= Skratch Bastid =

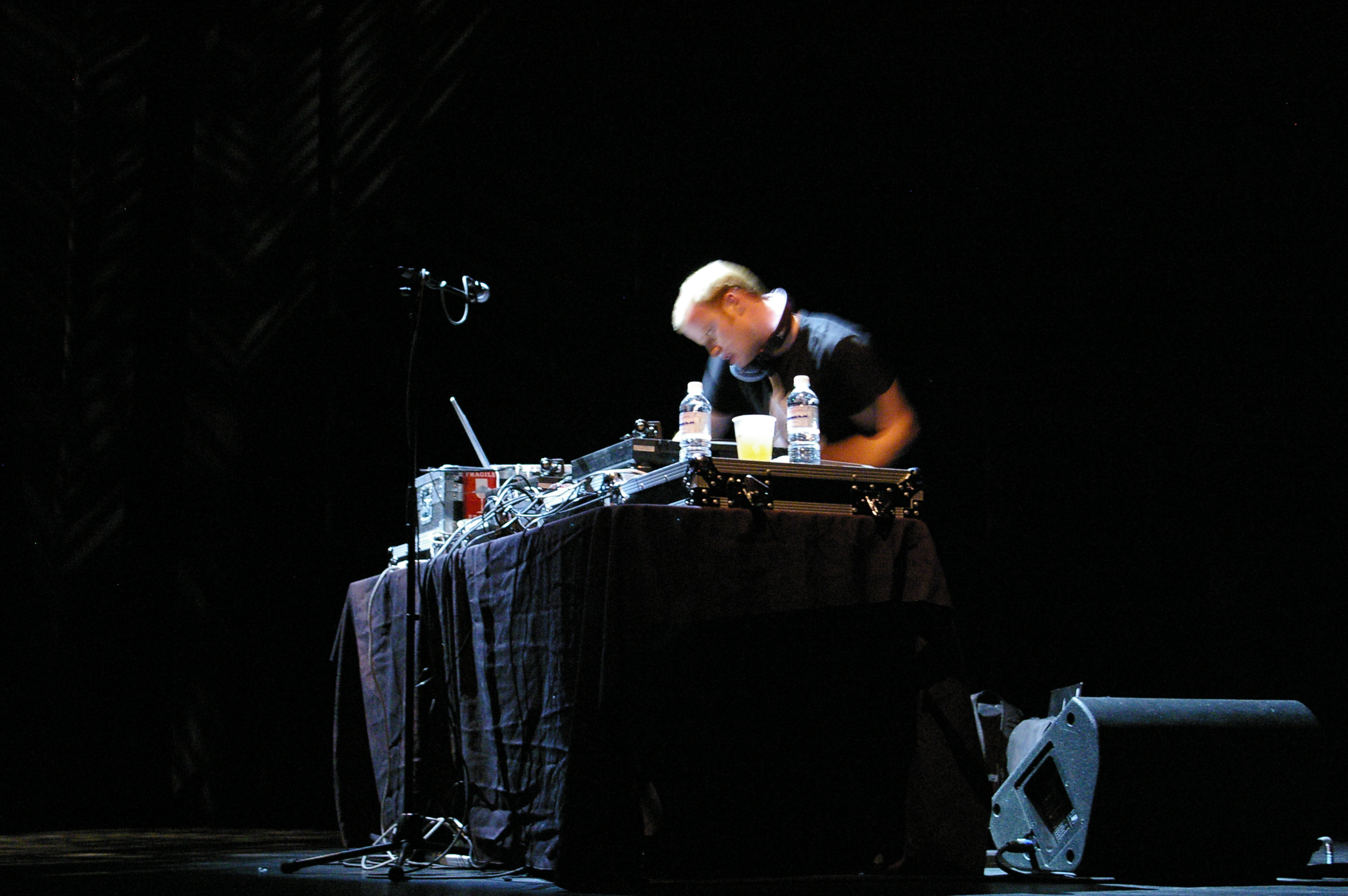
- Skratch Bastid performing in 2008

Background information
- Born: Paul Murphy; September 2, 1982 (age 43)
- Origin: Bedford, Nova Scotia, Canada
- Genres: Hip-hop; turntablism
- Occupations: DJ; record producer
- Years active: 2001–present
- Label: First Things First
- Website: www.skratchbastid.com

Paul Murphy (born September 2, 1982), better known by his stage name Skratch Bastid, is a Canadian DJ and record producer. He is a three-time Scribble Jam DJ Battle winner. He is the first-ever Canadian DJ to be nominated for the Juno Award for Producer of the Year.

== Early life ==
Skratch Bastid was born Paul Murphy on September 2, 1982. He is originally from Bedford, Nova Scotia. In high school, he played euphonium.

== Career ==
Skratch Bastid's rise to prominence began with his 2003 Scribble Jam win, and his world class status was solidified with subsequent victories in 2004 and 2007. He released a collaborative album with John Smith and Pip Skid, titled Taking Care of Business, on his own label First Things First Records in 2005, and was the first-ever Canadian DJ to be nominated for the Juno Award for Producer of the Year in 2008, for his work on Buck 65's album Situation. He was nominated for the Juno Award for Instrumental Album of the Year in 2016 for his collaborative project with Afiara String Quartet, titled Spin Cycle. Bastid also appeared as a featured artist on the track "ICQ" on Canadian funk band TWRP's "2nite" EP in 2015.

He is a global ambassador and judge for Red Bull's annual Thre3style DJ competition. Since 2010, he has hosted daytime block-party style events in various cities called Bastid's BBQ.

== Appearances in Other Media ==
A popular clip of Skratch Bastid competing at the 2001 Scribble Jam resurfaced in recent years. Its popularity is primarily due to his skillful scratching of "The Imperial March".

== Discography ==
=== Studio albums ===
- Taking Care of Business (2005) (with John Smith and Pip Skid)
- Spin Cycle (2015) (with Afiara String Quartet)

=== EPs ===
- The Spring Up (2013) (with Shad)

=== Singles ===
- "I Ain't Lazy" (2005) (with John Smith and Pip Skid)
- "Limoncello" (2016) (with Shad)
- "Stepchild" (2020) (with Nick Bike)

=== Mixtapes ===
- Blazin' (2003)
- Better Ask Somebody (2004)
- Get Up! (2007)
- Satisfaction Guaranteed (2008)
- 110% (2009)
- The Entertainer (2011)
- Soul Sisters, Stand Up! (2012) (with The Gaff)
- Songs We Listened to a Lot in 2012 (2013) (with Cosmo Baker)
- Songs We Listened to a Lot in 2013 (2014) (with Cosmo Baker)
- Songs We Listened to a Lot in 2014 (2015) (with Cosmo Baker)
- Songs We Listened to a Lot in 2015 (2016) (with Cosmo Baker)
- Songs We Listened to a Lot in 2016 (2017) (with Cosmo Baker)

=== Productions ===
- Buck 65 - Situation (2007)
- Shad - "Yall Know Me", "Fam Jam", "He Say She Say", "Dreams", and "Stylin" from Flying Colours (2013)
