= Situation (album) =

Studio album by Buck 65
- Released: October 30, 2007
- Genre: Hip hop
- Length: 51:19
- Labels: WEA (Worldwide); Strange Famous Records (US)
- Producer: Skratch Bastid

Buck 65 chronology
Strong Arm (2006)	Situation (2007)	20 Odd Years (2011)

Situation is a 2007 studio album by Canadian hip hop musician Buck 65. It is a concept album based around the year 1957. It peaked at number 31 on Billboard's Heatseekers Albums chart. At the 2008 Juno Awards, Skratch Bastid was nominated as Producer of the Year for his work on the album.

== Critical reception ==
Professional ratings
Aggregate scores
Source	Rating
Metacritic	68/100
Review scores
Source	Rating
All About Jazz	4.5/5 stars
Billboard	favorable
Christgau's Consumer Guide	A−
The Guardian	2/5 stars
Now	NNNN
The New York Times	favorable
Pitchfork	6.3/10
PopMatters	6/10 stars
Spin	5/10
Yahoo! Music	9/10 stars

Situation has received generally favorable reviews from critics. Metacritic gave the album a score of 68/100, based on 21 reviews.

Alex Macpherson of The Guardian gave the album 2 stars out of 5, saying: "There are isolated moments of beauty - the spare piano loop of 'Ho-Boys', though nothing new, is evocative and effective - but little sticks in the mind or stimulates the emotions." Dan Raper of PopMatters gave the album 6 stars out of 10, saying, "Situation is a cool, collected set of songs from the veteran Canadian rapper, but you shouldn't be expecting anything revolutionary—at least, not from the music."

== Track listing ==
No.	Title	Length
1.	"Intro"	1:40
2.	"1957"	3:57
3.	"Dang"	2:38
4.	"Lipstick"	3:08
5.	"Shutter Buggin'"	3:27
6.	"Spread 'Em"	2:50
7.	"Ho-Boys"	3:46
8.	"Way Back When"	3:32
9.	"Cop Shades"	4:07
10.	"The Beatific"	3:16
11.	"Mr. Nobody"	3:02
12.	"The Rebel"	3:15
13.	"Benz" (featuring Cadence Weapon)	2:32
14.	"Heatwave"	2:59
15.	"The Outskirts"	3:12
16.	"White Bread"	4:00
17.	"Way Back When (k-os Remix)" (bonus track on some versions)	3:36

== Charts ==
Chart (2007)	Peak position
Canadian Albums (Nielsen SoundScan)	48
US Heatseekers Albums (Billboard)	31
