= Mood Ruff =

- Origin: Winnipeg, Manitoba, Canada
- Genre: Hip hop
- Years active: 1994–2005
- Labels: Slo-Coach Records; Urbnet Records
- Past members: Odario; Spitz; Breakz; ICQRI

Mood Ruff was a Canadian hip-hop group formed in 1994 in Winnipeg. The group consisted of Odario, Spitz, Breakz, and ICQRI. Their final album I Do My Own Stunts, which was released in 2005, contained their first hit, "Rocketship".

== History ==
Mood Ruff's founding members, Odario and Spitz, met at Kelvin High School in Winnipeg, Manitoba. In the early 1990s, the two members started recording their first demos on a karaoke machine in Spitz's basement. They first started playing their music live in 1994, in small clubs around Toronto. "We were playing at this club called the 360 in Toronto and there were all of nine people there, five of which were from Winnipeg," says Odario about one of their very first live shows. They also toured with punk and funk bands.

They eventually started to gain an underground fan base all throughout Canada. In 1997, they started their own record label, Slo-Coach Records, and released their albums through this label. Also in 1997, the group founded the Peg City Holla Festival. This festival, which is held every summer, hosts a venue for hip-hop groups from Winnipeg. The festival has also had appearances by Ali Shaheed Muhammad from A Tribe Called Quest.

Their first hit was a single called "No Hooks" which received heavy rotation on Canada's Much Music video station and gained them national awareness. Their first album, Night.Life.Types, was released in 1999. This album was followed closely by their second album, Politic Different. Both albums received positive reviews and did reasonably well in regards to album sales. Their third album, Antarctica (Cold, Cold World), was released in 2002. This album featured ICQRI, the group's first DJ and the newest member of Mood Ruff. The album again received positive reviews, but was unable to achieve any large commercial success.

Their fourth and latest album, I Do My Own Stunts, was released in 2005. For this album, Mood Ruff introduced yet another new member, Breakz. I Do My Own Stunts continued the streak of critically acclaimed albums, and it also contained their first commercially successful single, "Rocketship".

The group broke up following I Do My Own Stunts. Odario is currently recording with Grand Analog.

== Members ==
Spitz, also known as Eli Epp (DJ Dow Jones), one of the two founding members of the group, was a child of a military family. During his childhood, himself and his three younger brothers moved to a different city every four years. He started out as a graffiti artist but has never divulged his tag name.

Born in a small village in Guyana, Odario or Garfield Williams is the second half of the founding duo. Along with his Mood Ruff obligations, he keeps very busy. He has appeared in over 15 films, and also leads a rock and roll group called Grand Analog.

Kevin Williams, Odario's younger brother, joined the group before the release of Antarctica (Cold, Cold World). He goes by the name ICQRI, and is the group's resident DJ. He also has many side projects; he has worked in several films as a stunt performer.

Breakz is the newest member of Mood Ruff. He appeared on their latest album, I Do My Own Stunts.

== Influences ==
Mood Ruff has a number of influences, both from hip-hop and from many other genres. Their music is noticeably influenced by the "golden age" of hip-hop artists like A Tribe Called Quest, KRS-One, and Public Enemy, who they once opened for. Fellow Canadian artist K-os also has influenced their sound. The group has said that while on the road they listen to other hip hop artists such as De La Soul and Common. Aside from hip-hop they also have said to be influenced by The Hives and 1980s pop. Odario has even admitted that Joni Mitchell is one of his favorite Canadian artists.

== "Rocketship" ==
"Rocketship" is the fourth song on the album I Do My Own Stunts, and the group's first commercial hit. The single has an upbeat and jazz-infused style which focuses on the group's love of girls and beats. The song features a sample from KRS-One's song "MC's Act Like They Don't Know" from his self-titled album KRS-One. The song received several awards and nominations, including being named CBC Radio 3's Top Canadian Track of 2005. Also the recording won a Western Canada Music Award in 2006 for Best Rap Recording. The song also achieved regular air time on Much Vibe, MTV Canada, and Much Music.

== Discography ==
- Night.Life.Types (1999)
- Politic Different (2000)
- Antarctica (Cold Cold World) (2002)
- I Do My Own Stunts (2005)

== See also ==
- Canadian hip hop
- Music of Canada
