= Neverlove =

Studio album by Buck 65
- Released: September 30, 2014
- Recorded: 2014
- Genre: Hip hop
- Label: Warner Music Canada

Buck 65 chronology
Laundromat Boogie (2014)	Neverlove (2014)

Neverlove is an album by Canadian hip-hop musician Buck 65. It was released on September 30, 2014.

The album was inspired by his divorce from his ex-wife. One day before its release, he also released the more lighthearted, and previously unannounced, album Laundromat Boogie through producer Jorun Bombay's Bandcamp page. Prior to the release of the album, a music video for the album track "Super Pretty Naughty" was to be premiered by Entertainment Tonight, but according to Buck 65 on his website, "...when they saw the video and heard the song, they banned it from their show for what they deemed to be objectionable visual and lyrical content."

== Track listing ==
1. "Gates of Hell"
2. "Je T'aime Mon Amour" (ft. Charlotte Savary)
3. "That's the Way Love Dies" (ft. Tiger Rosa)
4. "Love Will Fuck You Up"
5. "Only War" (ft. Tiger Rosa)
6. "Baby Blanket"
7. "Heart of Stone" (ft. Jessica Lee)
8. "Super Pretty Naughty" (ft. Francesca Anderson)
9. "She Fades"
10. "A Case for Us" (ft. Tiger Rosa)
11. "Roses in the Rain" (ft. Adaline)
12. "Danger and Play"
13. "Superhero in My Heart"
