= Man Overboard (Buck 65 album) =

Studio album by Buck 65
- Released: 2001
- Genre: Alternative hip hop
- Length: 69:57
- Label: Anticon
- Producer: Buck 65

Buck 65 chronology
Vertex (1997)	Man Overboard (2001)	Synesthesia (2001)

Alternative cover
- 2002 re-release artwork

Man Overboard is a studio album by Canadian hip hop musician Buck 65. Originally released on Anticon in 2001, it was re-released on Warner Bros. Records in 2002.

== Critical reception ==
Professional ratings
Review scores
Source	Rating
AllMusic	4/5 stars
Robert Christgau	(A−)
Exclaim!	(favorable)
Stylus Magazine	(A)

Man Overboard has received generally favorable reviews from critics. Clay Jarvis of Stylus Magazine called the album "a revolutionary album, using coolness as an instrument of subversion." Robert Christgau said "He's not deeply funky - more trip hop in spirit, even poetry-with-jazz. But the poems pack narrative logic and jokes galore". Thomas Quinlan of Exclaim! noted that "[the] beats are Buck's most laid back yet, but with a tendency towards some low-end sounds." It was ranked one of the 20 criminally underappreciated Canadian albums from '93 to '03 by Scott Reid of Cokemachineglow.

== Track listing ==
2001 Anticon release

No.	Title	Length
1.	"Off and Running"	3:10
2.	"Plastic Bag"	4:17
3.	"Up the Middle"	4:53
4.	"Hats on Beds"	5:31
5.	"Lil' Taste of Poland"	3:11
6.	"Sunday Driver"	2:00
7.	"Can of Worms"	3:22
8.	"You know the Science"	3:20
9.	"Ice"	4:54
10.	"Achilles and the Tortoise"	7:19
11.	"Coleco Vision"	9:32
12.	"Azazellos Cream"	1:27
13.	"Secret Splendor"	6:43
14.	"Pants on Fire"	6:24
15.	"Mudslide"	3:54

2002 Warner Bros. Records re-release

No.	Title	Length
1.	"Off and Running"	3:09
2.	"Plastic Bag"	4:59
3.	"Up the Middle"	2:03
4.	"Hats on Beds"	5:19
5.	"Lil' Taste of Poland"	3:11
6.	"Sunday Driver"	2:17
7.	"Can of Worms"	3:06
8.	"You Know the Science"	3:20
9.	"Ice"	4:56
10.	"Achilles And the Tortoise"	7:20
11.	"Coleco Vision"	10:57
12.	"Secret Splendor"	6:43
13.	"Pants on Fire"	6:24
14.	"Mudslide"	3:58
