= Birdapres =

Canadian rapper

- Born: Dane Jordan Goulet
- Origin: Vancouver, British Columbia, Canada
- Genre: Hip-hop
- Occupations: Rapper; songwriter
- Years active: 1995–present
- Member of: Golden Section
- Formerly of: Double Nice; Foolish Immortals

Dane Jordan Goulet, known professionally as Birdapres, is a rapper from Vancouver, British Columbia, Canada. He was once called "Vancouver's most underrated rapper," and has been praised for his thoughtful rhymes.

== Career ==
He self-released multiple albums in the late 1990s including Egocide and Alumni. In 2000 he released the solo album Bird Reynolds, followed by Collectors Item in 2001. Also released in 2001 was Alleged Legends with producer DJ Moves on Peanuts & Corn Records.

He released another collaboration album in 2004 titled Nothing Is Cool, with rapper and producer Mcenroe. Alleged Legends and Nothing Is Cool were called "two of the best releases for Peanuts & Corn" by Exclaim!'s Thomas Quinlan.

In 2006 he released the album Get It Done, which was named the best local release of the year by !earshot. He released Raw with DJ Brace in 2009, followed by Catch An L in 2011.

He has released several other albums since then, including collaborations with Jeff Spec, Buck 65 and Moka Only.

== Discography ==
=== Solo albums ===
- Egocide (self-released, 1996)
- Alumni (self-released, 1998)
- Bird Reynolds (East Van, 2000)
- Collectors Item (Legendary Entertainment, 2001)
- Get It Done (Peanuts & Corn, 2006)
- Catch An L (Marathon of Dope, 2011)

=== Solo EPs ===
- Toothpaste (self-released, 2008)
- Burquitlam (Peanuts & Corn, 2018)

=== Collaborative albums ===
- (with DJ RKV) As It Is (self-released, 1998)
- (with DJ Moves) Alleged Legends (Peanuts & Corn, 2001)
- (with DJ Moves) The Grind Vol. 1 - Permanent Full Time (self-released, 2004)
- (with Mcenroe) Nothing Is Cool (Peanuts & Corn, 2004)
- (with DJ Brace) Raw (Nostomania, 2009)
- (with Rob Crooks) Argyle (Marathon of Dope, 2013)
- (with Grey Jay) If and Only If (Marathon of Dope, 2014)
- (with Jeff Spec as Foolish Immortals) Illustration (Black Buffalo Records, 2021)
- (with Buck 65 as Double Nice) The Last Dig (self-released, 2022)
- (with K-Rec) Say Goodbye To Your Friends (Casual Dad Records, 2026)
- (with K-Rec and Moka Only) Welcome to the Agrodome (Urbnet Records, 2026)
