= Grand Analog =

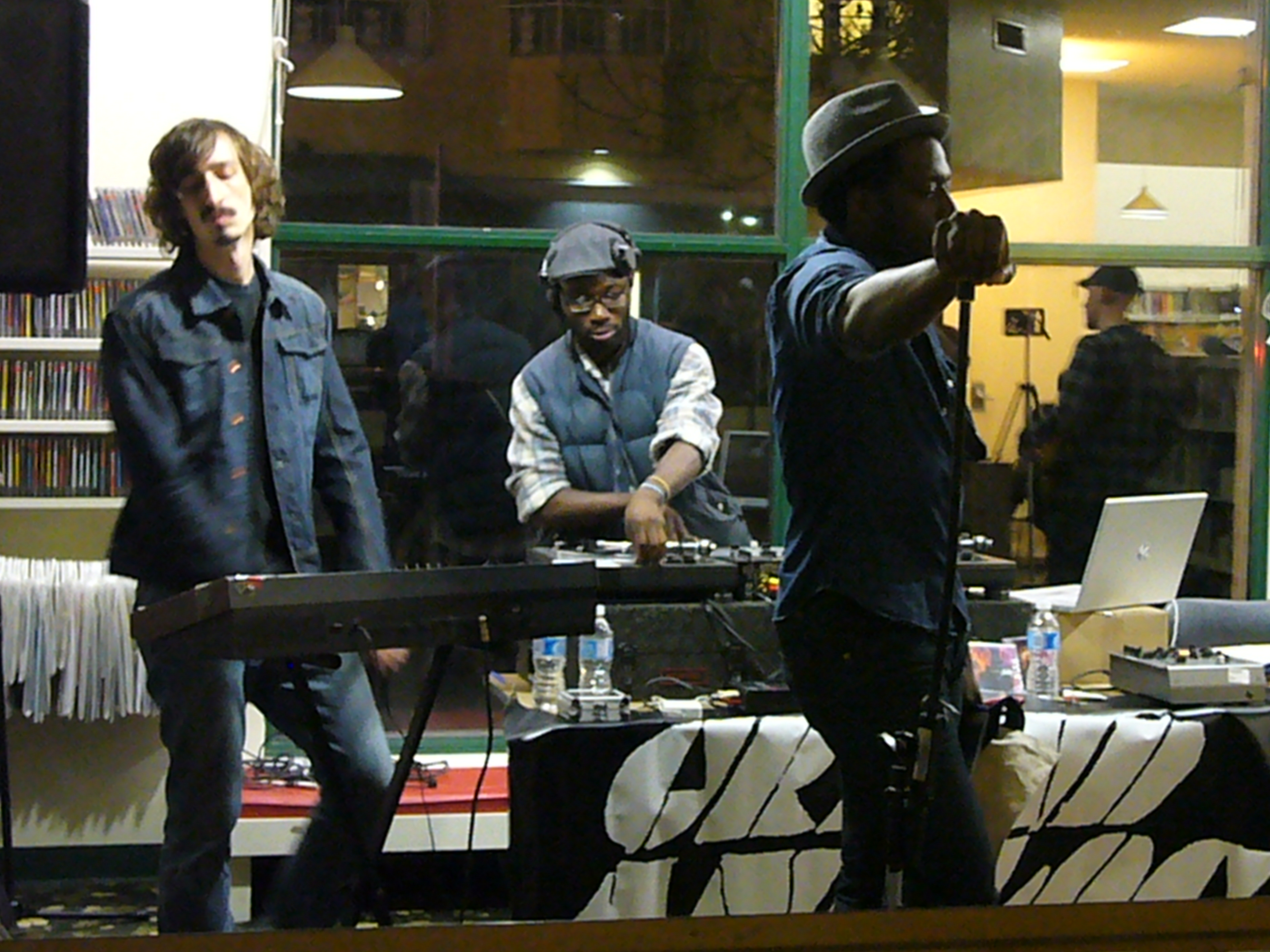
- Grand Analog, November 2009

Background information
- Origin: Winnipeg, Manitoba; Toronto, Ontario, Canada
- Genre: Canadian hip hop
- Years active: 2006 – present
- Labels: The Shadow Cabinet Music Group, Ferryhouse Records (GER)
- Members: Odario Williams; Warren Bray; Ofield Williams; TJ Garcia; Aubrey McGhee; Catalist

Grand Analog is a Canadian hip hop band, fronted by Odario Williams. The project combines R&B, jazz, reggae and rock influences into a hip hop style performed mainly on live instruments instead of digital electronics.

== History ==
Grand Analog was first formed by Williams in 2002 as a short-lived rock-oriented side project from his main band Mood Ruff. After Mood Ruff's breakup, he revived the project with a new focus on reggae and hip hop in 2006. Williams has told the press that "sonically, I knew that I wanted to dig into dub and rock and soul. I've always wanted to do that, but years ago I wasn't free enough upstairs to know that I could."

The band released their first album, Calligraffiti, in 2007. A follow-up album, titled Metropolis Is Burning, was released on May 26, 2009. The album topped the Canadian community and campus radio hip hop chart for several weeks.

Grand Analog won two Western Canadian Music Awards for Best Rap/Hip-Hop Recording in 2009 for Touch Your Toes EP and 2010 for Metropolis Is Burning.

The band's third album, Modern Thunder, was released in Canada on August 20, 2013. Modern Thunder was also released in various European countries on German label Ferryhouse Records; and released in the U.S. on Brooklyn label Feel Up Records.

In 2015, the band released an album, Roll Dub Soul Rap, and performed at a number of clubs in western Canada. In 2016, they released a video, "Love is a Battlefield".

== Discography ==
- Calligraffiti (2007)
- Metropolis Is Burning (2009)
- Modern Thunder (2013)
- Roll Dub Soul Rap (2015)
- Survival (2018)
