= Cory Bowles =

Canadian actor (born 1973)

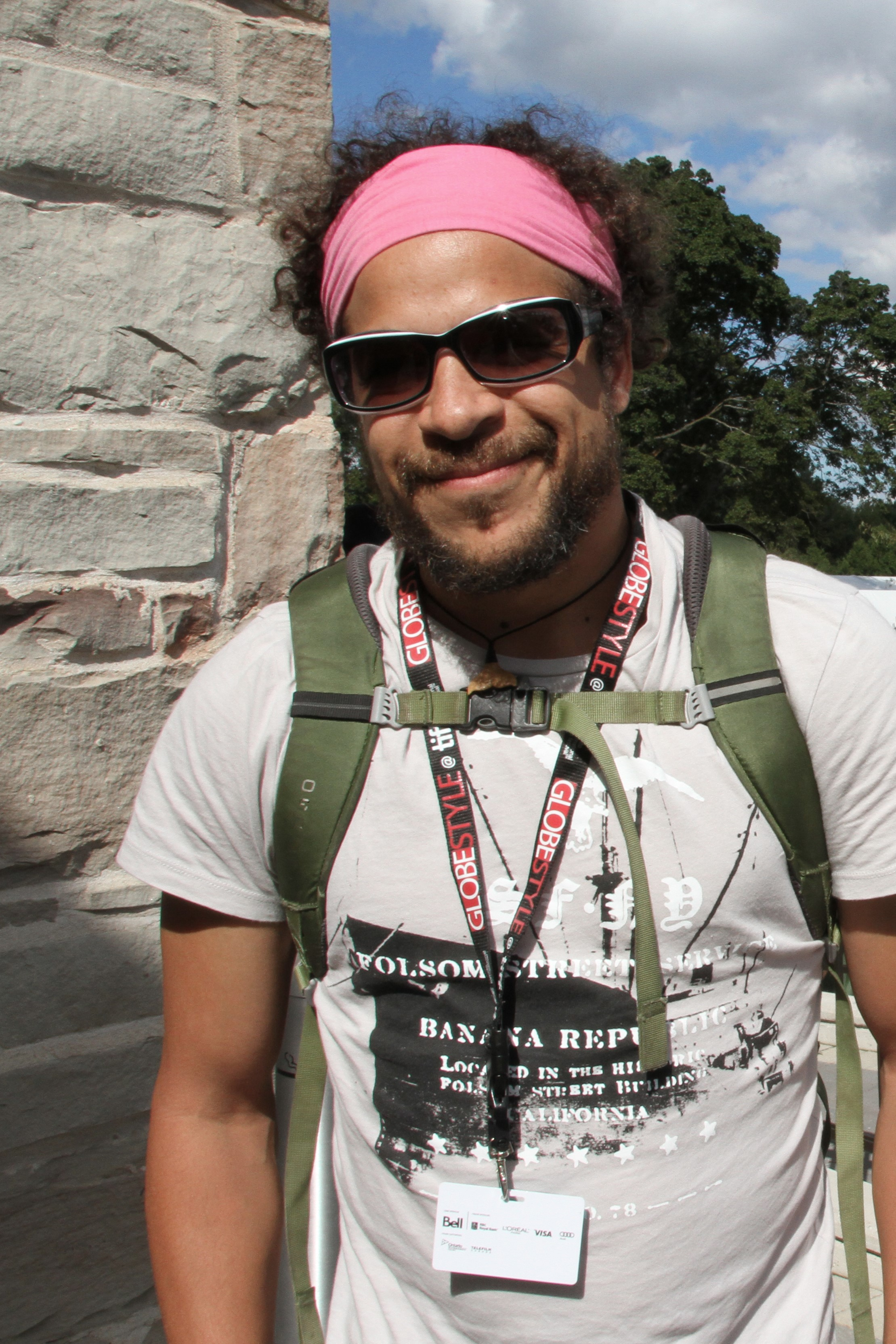
- Cory Bowles, September 2012
- Born: August 27, 1973 (age 53); Montreal, Quebec, Canada

Cory Bowles (born August 27, 1973) is a Canadian actor, director and choreographer. He is best known for his portrayal of Cory in the series Trailer Park Boys.

== Life and career ==
Bowles was born in Montreal, Quebec and raised in Truro, Nova Scotia.

Best known as Cory in Trailer Park Boys, he also is the principal choreographer of Halifax-based Contemporary Dance Company Verve Mwendo, plays in the rock band Aide-De-Camp and voices the children's series Poko. In the mid-1990s Bowles gained some prominence as MC of hip hop act Hip Club Groove, performing under the name "Cheklove Shakil". The group released an EP on No Records and later a full length on Murderecords. The group toured Canada, often opening for other Halifax based bands such as Sloan.

Bowles later formed a theatre company in 1997 with bandmate Joseph Wynne called The Good Companions. After closing down the company he went on to further his studies as a dancer and choreographer in Alberta.

Bowles received a Gemini Award for his work on Trailer Park Boys and ECMA nominations for music. His quirky choreography has turned up in music videos for artists such as Matt Mays and Jenn Grant.

Bowles left Trailer Park Boys after the sixth season in 2006 and continued to work in film, theatre and music at Bishop's University. Bowles rejoined the cast of Trailer Park Boys in season 8 after the show was picked up by Netflix in 2013.

Bowles wrote, directed and narrated the feature film Black Cop, which won the award for Best Canadian Feature Film at the 2017 Vancouver International Film Festival and the John Dunning Discovery Award at the 6th Canadian Screen Awards.

Since Black Cop, Bowles has transitioned back into television, directing various episodes of Canadian series such as Coroner, Pretty Hard Cases, and Diggstown.

== Personal life ==
Bowles is an African-Nova Scotian with roots among Black Loyalists, Maroons and the original French Colonies. Bowles has travelled the globe studying the roots of Black dance and music, particularly through his own family line. Bowles has a strong passion for his cultural background and the storytelling traditions of the African Diaspora.

== Filmography ==
- Trailer Park Boys: The Movie (2006)
- Poor Boy's Game (2007)
- The Gospel According to the Blues (2010)
- Roaming (2013)
- Black Cop (2017)

Short Films

- The Scavengers (2008)
- Heart of Rhyme (2011)
- The Anatomy of Assistance (2013)
- Righteous (2014)
- Black Cop (2016)

== Television ==
- Trailer Park Boys (2001–2006; 2014–Present)
- Poko (2003–2006)
- North/South (2006)
- TV with TV's Jonathan Torrens (2009)
- Call Me Fitz (2011)
- Pure (2017)
- Diggstown (2019)
- The Parker Andersons/Amelia Parker (2021)
- FBI: Most Wanted (2022-2024)
- CIA (2026)

== Discography ==
- 2006 Dear Skeleton - AIDE-DE-CAMP (Safety Workbook)
- 2005 E - AIDE-DE-CAMP (Safety Workbook)
- 2001 Hiss II - DJ MOVES (Low Pressure)
- 1999 The Hooded Fang - Josh Martinez (Camobear)
- 1998 Psyche Intangible - Sixtoo (Metaforensics)
- 1996 Land of the Lost - Hip Club Groove (Funtrip Records)
- 1995 Superstar - Len (Funtrip Records)
- 1996 Bassments of Badmen - Various Artists (Hand'solo Recordings)
- 1994 Trailer Park Hip Hop - Hip Club Groove (Murderecords)
- 1993 Cool Beans EP - Hip Club Groove (with Len and Zoltar) (No Records)
