= Feelin' Alright (Len song) =

1999 single by Len

Single by Len

from the album You Can't Stop the Bum Rush
- B-side: "Man of the Year"
- Released: October 19, 1999
- Studio: Four Ways Studios
- Genre: Alternative rock; heavy metal
- Length: 3:59
- Label: Work
- Songwriters: Marc Costanzo; Derek MacKenzie; Sharon Costanzo; Michael Bruce (Note: Michael Bruce and Spencer Lynn Kirkpatrick are credited as they wrote "Let Me Down Easy".); Spencer Lynn Kirkpatrick
- Producer: Mumble C

Len singles chronology
"Steal My Sunshine" (1999)	"Feelin' Alright" (1999)	"Cryptik Souls Crew" (2000)

Music video
- "Feelin' Alright" on YouTube

"Feelin' Alright" is a song by Canadian alternative rock band Len from their third studio album, You Can't Stop the Bum Rush (1999). Marc Costanzo produced the song and wrote it with Derek MacKenzie and Sharon Costanzo. The Work Group released it as the album's second single on October 19, 1999. An alternative rock song with heavy metal influences, it samples Hydra's song "Let Me Down Easy". A duet between Marc and Sharon Costanzo, the song is about thinking positively when faced with adversity.

Critics were favorable of "Feelin' Alright"'s musical composition, with several highlighting C.C. DeVille's guitar solo. Costanzo directed the music video for it, which featured guest appearances from DeVille and Danny Masterson. In the video, the members of Len attend classes at Leaside High School and DeVille plays guitar in the cafeteria. In further promotion, Len performed "Feelin' Alright" at festivals such as Edgefest and Fresh Festival. Media usage has included placement in the television series Daria.

== Background and release ==
Underwhelmed by popular music in the 1990s, siblings Marc and Sharon Costanzo wanted to create songs with "a fun feeling" for Len's third studio album, You Can't Stop the Bum Rush (1999). According to Sharon, the duo was influenced by artists and genres from the 1980s that they grew up listening to. After Marc created a sample of Hydra's song "Let Me Down Easy", the duo and Derek "D-Rock" Mackenzie wrote the song in Los Angeles. The group wanted a guitar solo on the song, and they asked Eddie Van Halen and Slash, both of whom were unavailable. As a result, the group asked C.C. DeVille, who recorded a guitar solo for the song in two minutes.

After their song "Steal My Sunshine" attained wide commercial success, Len struggled to select a follow-up single. According to Marc, "we knew there was no other single [on the album]. We were surprised there was even one single." Some music critics, such as Ann Powers of The New York Times, cited "Feelin' Alright" as a "probable single" from the album. In July 1999, Billboard reported that "Feelin' Alright" was selected as a single with a tentative release in September. "Feelin' Alright" was serviced to alternative radio stations in the United States on October 19, 1999. To promote the song, Len performed it at festivals such as Edgefest and Fresh Festival, and it appeared in an episode of the television series Daria on February 25, 2000.

== Composition and lyrics ==
"Feelin' Alright" has a length of three minutes and fifty-nine seconds. Costanzo produced the song under the stage name Mumble C, and it was engineered and mixed by John X. C.C. DeVille plays guitar and Larry Ciancia plays drums. David Motson mastered it at Sony Music in New York City.

== Reception ==
Tony Scherman of The New York Times praised the song, citing it as an appealing attempt at "heavy metal". Also from The New York Times, Ann Powers compared the song's lyrical content to The Offspring in addition to citing the song as a "probable single" from You Can't Stop the Bum Rush. Ron Harris of the Associated Press noted the influence of "early 1980s glam rock" on the song, further referring to it as a "rote, four-chord" track. Richard Harrington of The Washington Post referred to "Feelin' Alright" as a "metal tune", highlighting C.C. DeVille's guest appearance on the song. "Feelin' Alright" did not appear on any music charts.

== Music video ==
=== Background ===
The music video was directed by frontman Marc Costanzo at Leaside High School in Toronto, Canada. The video features guest appearances from Danny Masterson and C.C. DeVille, who performs the guitar solo in the cafeteria.

=== Synopsis ===
The video opens with Marc at home having breakfast with D Rock and a little girl dressed as a fairy. Marc and the girl argue over whether or not Marc will be late for school, shortly before Marc realizes that he missed the school bus. As the song begins, the video cuts to various shots of students arriving at their high school. The video then cuts to Marc as he sings and walks through the school hallway with the other Len group members, before they meet Sharon in their chemistry class. Once the first chorus begins, the video cuts to students chatting and trading notes in the cafeteria, before focusing on Sharon and other girls primping in the restroom. As C.C. DeVille's guitar solo begins, he is seen playing an electric guitar on the cafeteria tables. As the post-chorus begins, Sharon sings while walking along the sidelines of the gymnasium, where cheerleaders and wrestlers are practicing. Once Marc begins to sing the bridge, the video cuts to the Len group members fooling around in the hallways. During the final chorus, Marc and his friends are shown hanging out on the front entrance steps to the school. As the final post-chorus begins, the video intercuts between scenes of students chatting in the hallways, Marc boarding the school bus, and Sharon driving home with her friends.

== Formats and track listings ==
Digital download

1. "Feelin' Alright" (single edit) – 3:42
2. "Feelin' Alright" (Dust Brothers remix) – 3:42
3. "Feelin' Alright" (extended LP edit) – 6:24

CD single

1. "Feelin' Alright" (single edit) – 3:52
2. "Feelin' Alright" (Dust Brothers remix) – 3:38
3. "Feelin' Alright" (The Wiseguys remix) – 6:24

Vinyl

1. "Feelin' Alright" (Dust Brothers remix) – 4:32
2. "Feelin' Alright" (extended LP edit) – 6:30
3. "Feelin' Alright" (Dust Brothers instrumental) – 4:32
4. "Man of the Year" – 5:07
5. "Feelin' Alright" (bonus beats) – 1:00

== Credits and personnel ==
Credits are adapted from the liner notes of You Can't Stop the Bum Rush.

- Marc Costanzo – producer, songwriter
- Derek MacKenzie – songwriter
- Sharon Costanzo – songwriter
- Michael Bruce – songwriter
- Spencer Lynn Kirkpatrick – songwriter
- C.C. DeVille – guitar
- Larry Ciancia – drums
- John X – mixing, engineer
- David Mitson – mastering

== Release history ==
Region	Date	Format	Label	Ref.
United States	October 19, 1999	Alternative radio	Work; Epic	
United States	October 26, 1999	Alternative radio	Work; Epic	
United States	November 2, 1999	Alternative radio	Work; Epic	
