= Hip Club Groove =

Canadian hip hop band

- Origin: Truro, Nova Scotia
- Genre: Canadian hip hop
- Years active: 1991–1996
- Labels: No Records murderecords Funtrip
- Past members: Derek "D-Rock" Mackenzie; Brian "DJ Moves" Higgins; Cory "Cheklove Shakil" Bowles

Hip Club Groove was a Canadian hip hop band, active in the 1990s. Originally from Truro, Nova Scotia, and later based in Halifax, the band consisted of rappers Derek "MC" Mackenzie and Cory "Cheklove Shakil" Bowles, and DJ Brian "DJ Moves" Higgins.

== History ==
Hip Club Groove started in Truro when its members were in high school. As well as Mackenzie and Bowles, the group's original lineup also included Sixtoo and Gordski, who both left the band before its full-length debut album but remained occasional collaborators. Another sometime collaborator was "Stinkin' Rich" Terfry, who later became better known as solo hip hop artist Buck 65.

The band released the EP Cool Beans in 1993 on No Records, before signing to Sloan's Murderecords for 1994's Trailer Park Hip Hop. They then toured with Sloan in support of the album.

Hip Club Groove released their second and final album, Land of the Lost, on Funtrip Records in 1996. The band broke up soon after, and Higgins and Mackenzie went on to join Len as touring musicians; they performed on a few tracks on Len's 1999 album You Can't Stop the Bum Rush, where Higgins retained the name DJ Moves but Mackenzie was known as D-Rock. Bowles took an acting role in the television series Trailer Park Boys. After leaving Len, Mackenzie re-emerged in the band Alcona and later the hip hop duo 5.1.nine.0.2. with producer Recordface. Bowles later returned to music with the band Aide-de-Camp. DJ Moves has released material as a solo artist.

The band released a compilation album, Unreleased & Rare, in 2010.

== Discography ==
- Cool Beans (1993)
- Trailer Park Hip Hop (1994)
- Land of the Lost (1996)
- Unreleased & Rare (2010)
