= Veglia (disambiguation) =

Veglia is the Italian name for Krk, a Croatian island.

Veglia may also refer to:

== People ==
- Lorenzo Veglia (born 1996), Italian racing driver
- Roberto Veglia (born 1957), Italian long jumper

== Other uses ==
- Alpe Veglia and Alpe Devero Natural Park, park in Italy
- Still Alive at the Veglia Lounge, song
