= Interludes After Midnight =

Interludes After Midnight may refer to:

- Interludes After Midnight, a nude talk show hosted by Dan Landers on Channel J
- Interludes After Midnight (album), a 2012 album by Blockhead
