= Music scene =

A music scene is any kind of music community.

Music scene may also refer to:

- Indie music scene, a localized independent music-oriented community of bands and their audiences.
- Music scene (programming), part of the Demoscene
- The Music Scene (magazine), a Canadian magazine dedicated to promoting classical music and jazz
- The Music Scene (TV series), a TV show that aired in 1969
- The Music Scene (album), an album by American producer Blockhead
