= Sleep No More (DJ Signify album) =

Studio album by DJ Signify
- Released: April 20, 2004
- Genre: Hip hop
- Length: 62:38
- Label: Lex Records
- Producer: DJ Signify; Elektro4

DJ Signify chronology
Sleep No More (2004)	Of Cities (2009)

Singles from Sleep No More
- 1. "Winter's Going" Released: 2004

Sleep No More is the first studio album by American hip hop producer DJ Signify. It was released on Lex Records on April 20, 2004. It features guest appearances from Sage Francis and Buck 65. The album peaked at number 86 on the CMJ Top 200 chart.

== Critical reception ==
Professional ratings
Review scores
Source	Rating
AllMusic	3/5 stars
CMJ New Music Monthly	favorbale
Cokemachineglow	78/100
Dusted Magazine	favorable
Exclaim!	favorable
HipHopDX	7.5/10
Pitchfork	8.7/10
RapReviews.com	6.5/10

Joshua Glazer of AllMusic gave the album 3 stars out of 5, saying: "Listening to the beats on DJ Signify's debut release, there are moments of terrific innovation, but equal amounts of utterly dated trip-hop dirge." Rollie Pemberton of Pitchfork gave the album an 8.7 out of 10, commenting that "Sleep No More's brilliant journey into sample-based experimentation easily places DJ Signify in a league with the genre's best-known producers." Noel Dix of Exclaim! wrote: "Certainly not something you want to throw on when you want to cheer yourself up, DJ Signify likes using chilling horn samples and dirty drums at a slow pace to piece together a soundtrack to an imaginary horror flick."

== Track listing ==
No.	Title	Length
1.	"Fly Away"	6:09
2.	"Kiddie Litter" (featuring Sage Francis)	2:48
3.	"Migraine"	2:19
4.	"Stranded" (featuring Buck 65)	3:47
5.	"The Nods"	1:45
6.	"Haunted House Party" (featuring Sage Francis)	2:34
7.	"Winter's Going" (featuring Buck 65)	4:58
8.	"Peek a Boo, Pt. 1"	1:28
9.	"Peek a Boo, Pt. 2"	2:08
10.	"Peek a Boo, Pt. 3"	2:30
11.	"Cup of Regret" (featuring Sage Francis)	3:25
12.	"Shatter & Splatter"	2:03
13.	"Red to Black" (featuring Buck 65)	2:31
14.	"Five Leaves Left (For Lauren)"	3:26
15.	"Dirty"	2:38
16.	"Where Did She Go?" (featuring Buck 65)	3:00
17.	"Breath"	15:09
Total length:		62:38

== Personnel ==
Credits adapted from liner notes.

- DJ Signify – production, arrangement, mixing
- Sage Francis – vocals (2, 6, 11)
- Buck 65 – vocals (4, 7, 13, 16)
- Sixtoo – additional drums (7), engineering
- Elektro4 – co-production (7), mixing
- Ehquestionmark – artwork
