= Music by Cavelight =

Studio album by Blockhead
- Released: March 23, 2004
- Genre: Instrumental hip hop; sound collage
- Length: 51:07
- Label: Ninja Tune
- Producer: Blockhead

Blockhead chronology
Music by Cavelight (2004)	Downtown Science (2005)

Singles from Music by Cavelight
- 1. "Insomniac Olympics" Released: 2003; 2. "Sunday Seance" Released: 2004

Music by Cavelight is the first solo studio album by American hip hop producer Blockhead. It was released on Ninja Tune on March 23, 2004. It peaked at number 43 on the UK Independent Albums Chart. It received generally favorable reviews from critics.

== Release ==
Music by Cavelight came about when Mush Records, for whom Blockhead had already produced a breakbeat album, asked him to produce an album. After Mush Records stopped returning his phone calls, he and his manager sent the demos around other labels before Ninja Tune, having received a copy through Warp Records, offered to release the album.

== Critical reception ==
Professional ratings
Aggregate scores
Source	Rating
Metacritic	72/100
Review scores
Source	Rating
AllMusic	3/5 stars
CMJ New Music Monthly	favorable
Exclaim!	favorable
HipHopDX	4/5 stars
MusicOMH	favorable
Pitchfork	6.5/10
PopMatters	favorable
Stylus Magazine	D+

At Metacritic, which assigns a weighted average score out of 100 to reviews from mainstream critics, the album received an average score of 72, based on 10 reviews, indicating "generally favorable reviews".

John Bush of AllMusic wrote, "These tracks are much smoother than the warped jams that fans of his hip-hop work know him for; most of the instrument sources on these tracks are not only recognizable, but hardly tampered with at all." Rollie Pemberton of Pitchfork stated that "All around, Blockhead's first foray into solo sound collage is far from bad, but it rarely steals the show the way his rapper-associated work tends to."

== Track listing ==
Original UK edition
No.	Title	Length
1.	"Insomniac Olympics"	5:06
2.	"Carnivores Unite"	4:46
3.	"You've Got Maelstrom"	4:47
4.	"Sunday Seance"	5:26
5.	"A Better Place"	4:26
6.	"Road Rage Breakdown"	4:15
7.	"Triptych Pt. 1"	4:03
8.	"Triptych Pt. 2"	3:04
9.	"Triptych Pt. 3"	2:54
10.	"Jet Son"	3:48
11.	"Breathe and Start"	4:22
12.	"Music by Cavelight"	4:10
Total length:		51:07

North American edition
No.	Title	Length
1.	"Hello Popartz"	2:24
2.	"You've Got Maelstrom"	4:47
3.	"Carnivores Unite"	4:46
4.	"Sunday Seance"	5:26
5.	"A Better Place"	4:26
6.	"Road Rage Breakdown"	4:15
7.	"Triptych Pt. 1"	4:04
8.	"Triptych Pt. 2"	3:04
9.	"Triptych Pt. 3"	2:54
10.	"Jet Son"	3:48
11.	"Music by Cavelight"	4:10
12.	"Breathe and Start"	4:22
13.	"Bullfight in Ireland"	4:46
14.	"Insomniac Olympics"	5:06
Total length:		58:21

Limited edition CD bonus disc: Aesop Rock Instrumentals
No.	Title	Length
1.	"Daylight"	4:28
2.	"Night Light"	2:16
3.	"11:35"	4:21
4.	"Maintenance"	4:30
5.	"Forest Crunk"	4:40
Total length:		20:15

== Personnel ==
Credits adapted from the original UK edition CD liner notes.

- Blockhead – production, executive production
- Damien Paris – guitar (2, 5, 10), bass guitar (9)
- Omega One – turntables (2, 3, 10, 11)
- Baby Dayliner – violin (11), recording, mixing, executive production
- Voda – mastering
- Gabe Hilfer – executive production
- Maya Hayuk – photography, design

== Charts ==
Chart	Peak position
UK Independent Albums (OCC)	43
