= Multiple Media Entertainment =

Canadian media distribution company

Multiple Media Entertainment Logo

Multiple Media Entertainment is a full-service media content distribution company with offices in Toronto and Vancouver. Co-founded by Drew Craig (Chairman) and Michael Taylor (CEO).

They are involved in all aspects of the entertainment content industry including co-development, co-production, distribution, product integration, branded content, barter distribution, etc.

Multiple Media Entertainment works with program producers, program suppliers and all of the Canadian media outlets, in all media, including television, radio, outdoor, print, online, mobile, etc. They also provide resources to assist producers to produce media content; assist distributors to distribute media content; and assist media outlets in commissioning and acquiring media content.

== Projects and Titles ==
Multiple Media Entertainment acquired the Canadian rights to mini-series 'Neverland' starring Charles Dance and Rhys Ifans, the North American distribution rights to 'Off World', a beautifully shot drama by Mateo Guez, and also secured the Worldwide rights to 'Burning Daylight' starring Robert Knepper. Multiple Media Entertainment signed a long-term exclusive Canadian distribution arrangement with Los Angeles-based 'Osiris Entertainment'. Upcoming titles include 'Pretty Ugly People' starring Academy Award- and Golden Globe Award-winning actress Octavia Spencer, the Emmy Award-winning Melissa McCarthy, and Josh Hopkins; 'Listen To Your Heart' starring Cybill Shepherd; 'Weakness' starring Josh Charles from 'The Good Wife' and Bobby Cannavale from 'Nurse Jackie'; and 'Eva' starring Patrick Bergin from 'Sleeping With The Enemy', Dustin Milligan from 'Call Me Fitz' and Michael Ironside from 'XMen: First Class'. Multiple Media Entertainment will be working with 'Bedlam Productions', a partner on the Oscar-winning 'The King's Speech', to develop a mini series entitled 'Magna Carta'. Canadian writer Donald Martin is on board to write the script, along with Michael Taylor, Drew Craig, Chris Morley, and Gareth Unwin, who will share executive producer credits. More recently, the company acquired the rights to Canadian Award-winning drama 'Passionflower'. The film was awarded Best Feature at two American film festivals, as well as Best Director, Best Editor and Best Outstanding Performance by a Female Actress for lead actress, Kristen Harris.

=== Some of the other titles include ===
- Flipper (1964 TV series) - starring Brian Kelly (actor), Luke Halpin and Tommy Norden
- Mr. Men Show (1997) (TV series)
- Lonesome Dove: The Series (1995) - starring Eric McCormack
- The Pathfinder (film) (1996) - starring Kevin Dillon and Laurie Holden
- Song of Hiawatha (1997) - starring Graham Greene (actor) and Adam Beach
- Dummy (2008) - starring Aaron Johnson
- Off World (2009) - starring Marc Abaya
- Silent But Deadly (2011) - starring Jason Mewes
- Neverland (miniseries) (2011) - starring Charles Dance, Rhys Ifans, Anna Friel and Keira Knightley
- A Little Bit Zombie (2012) - starring Stephen McHattie, Shawn Roberts, Kristopher Turner and Crystal Lowe
- Roaming (2013) - starring Rhys Bevan-John and Cory Bowles

== MME Factual ==
In May 2011, Multiple Media Entertainment launched a factual series production arm, MME Factual. As an unscripted producer, MME Factual is based in Vancouver and run by Blair Reekie and Mark Miller. Upon its launch, MME Factual attended the Banff World Media Festival with a slate of 17 new projects in the pipeline.

== iPowow ==
iPowow Canada Corp. is a partnership between: iPowow! Limited (founded by Ettienne Fourie and Peter Tippett) the Australian corporation that developed the technology; Toronto-based Multiple Media Entertainment Inc. (founded by Michael Taylor and Drew Craig); and British Columbia-based Tim Gamble, Cam White and Holly Gordon.

What iPowow does: iPowow is a patented and proven interactive media platform that gives broadcasters the power to ask their audiences a question and get an instant answer. iPowow’s global, cloud-hosted platform collects and combines their responses and then delivers them digitally, second by second, with the ability to integrate and reveal the results live, on-screen, and in real-time.

== Website ==
- http://www.multiplemedia.ca
