= Funtrip Records =

Canadian independent record label

Funtrip Records is a Canadian independent record label founded in the early 1990s by musician Marc Costanzo. His band Len recorded an EP and two albums, Superstar (1994) and Get Your Legs Broke (1996) on Funtrip, which were co-released by Halifax-based No Records in the early 1990s, and later re-released in partnership with the company's distribution arm No Distribution after Len's major label success in 2001.

The company also "managed" other Canadian indie acts such as Buck 65, Sixtoo, Hip Club Groove and Cheklove. Costanzo also has another record company called Four Ways To Rock.

== See also ==
- List of record labels
