= Drunken style =

Drunken style usually refers to martial arts performed as if under the influence of alcohol intoxication:

- Drunken boxing
- Drunken Monkey

The term may also refer to:

- "Drunken Style", a song by Len from the 1997 album Get Your Legs Broke
- "Drunken Style", a song by Squarepusher from the 1998 album Music Is Rotted One Note
- "Drunken Style", a song by Brotha Lynch Hung and C-Bo from the 2001 album Blocc Movement
- "Drunken Styles", a song by Snow from the 1993 album 12 Inches of Snow
