= Downtown Science (Blockhead album) =

Studio album by Blockhead
- Released: October 18, 2005
- Genre: Instrumental hip hop
- Length: 54:06
- Label: Ninja Tune
- Producer: Blockhead

Blockhead chronology
Music by Cavelight (2004)	Downtown Science (2005)	Uncle Tony's Coloring Book (2007)

Downtown Science is the second solo studio album by American hip hop producer Blockhead. It was released on Ninja Tune on October 18, 2005.

== Critical reception ==
Professional ratings
Review scores
Source	Rating
Billboard	mixed
Exclaim!	favorable
MusicOMH	favorable
Pitchfork	6.6/10
PopMatters	7/10 stars

Chris Ingold of MusicOMH commented that "this is an album to stick on your iPod as you walk through Manhattan at night, even if it's a pretend Manhattan in your home town miles away." Jason Crock of Pitchfork wrote, "Downtown Science could have been a sleek limousine ride through Blockhead's version of New York, but we'll have to settle for an appropriately funky cab ride."

== Track listing ==
No.	Title	Length
1.	"Expiration Date"	5:42
2.	"Roll Out the Red Carpet"	4:10
3.	"Serenade"	1:50
4.	"Cherry Picker"	6:22
5.	"Crashing Down"	4:13
6.	"Stop Motion Traffic"	4:37
7.	"The Art of Walking"	3:44
8.	"Good Block Bad Block"	4:27
9.	"Dough Nation"	4:15
10.	"Quiet Storm"	5:57
11.	"The First Snowfall"	4:50
12.	"Long Walk Home"	4:08
Total length:		54:06

== Personnel ==
Credits adapted from the CD liner notes.

- Blockhead – production
- Damien Paris – co-production (3, 5, 7, 8, 12), guitar (1, 5, 6, 8, 11, 12), bass guitar (7, 8)
- John Rosenthal – upright bass (4)
- Bummy D and the Port Authority Three – harmonica (9), cans (9)
- Andrew Totolos – drums (9), mixing
- Baby Dayliner – mixing
- B. Smith – layout, design
