= Interludes After Midnight (album) =

Studio album by Blockhead
- Released: April 30, 2012
- Genre: Instrumental hip hop
- Length: 63:06
- Label: Ninja Tune
- Producer: Blockhead

Blockhead chronology
The Music Scene (2009)	Interludes After Midnight (2012)	Bells and Whistles (2014)

Interludes After Midnight is the fifth solo studio album by American hip hop producer Blockhead. It was released on Ninja Tune on April 30, 2012.

== Critical reception ==
Professional ratings
Review scores
Source	Rating
Alarm	favorable
Exclaim!	favorable
HipHopDX	4.0/5
L.A. Record	favorable
Spin	7/10

Aaron Matthews of Exclaim! described the album as "a bleary descent into the darker hours of night, evoking dollar cabs, cheap pizza and half-emptied 40 oz. bottles." D. M. Collins of L.A. Record called it "an album that follows through on the promise of hip hop and breakbeat that rarely gets fulfilled: full sample immersion that leaves its sources big and bold yet fully, delightfully rearranged, a true collage braided together lovingly with original combinations of boxy beats and tinkling treble tones." Roman Cooper of HipHopDX wrote, "While other producers release 'instrumental albums' that are little more than beat tapes, Blockhead provides a soundtrack for the listener's thoughts, regardless of how actively engaged they are."

== Track listing ==
No.	Title	Length
1.	"Never Forget Your Token"	4:16
2.	"Creeps Crouchin'"	5:44
3.	"Panic in Funkytown"	5:11
4.	"Hungover like Whoa"	5:49
5.	"Meet You at Tower Records"	5:19
6.	"Escape the Meadow"	5:04
7.	"Smoke Signals"	5:38
8.	"Tools of the Industry"	4:57
9.	"Midnight Blue"	5:44
10.	"Snapping Point"	5:23
11.	"Beyond Reach" (featuring Baby Dayliner)	5:17
12.	"The Robin Byrd Era"	4:44
Total length:		63:06

== Personnel ==
Credits adapted from the CD liner notes.

- Blockhead – production
- Damien Paris – guitar, bass guitar
- Baby Dayliner – vocals (11), mixing
- Owen Brozman – artwork
