= You Can't Stop the Bum Rush =

1999 studio album by Len

Studio album by Len
- Released: May 25, 1999
- Studios: Four Ways; Metalworks; Adinsound
- Length: 44:07
- Labels: Work; Sony
- Producers: Mumble C; Fisher; Big King

Len chronology
Get Your Legs Broke (1997)	You Can't Stop the Bum Rush (1999)	The Diary of the Madmen (2005)

Singles from You Can't Stop the Bum Rush
- 1. "Steal My Sunshine" Released: June 22, 1999; 2. "Feelin' Alright" Released: October 19, 1999; 3. "Cryptik Souls Crew" Released: 2000

You Can't Stop the Bum Rush is the third studio album by Canadian alternative rock band Len. It was released on May 25, 1999, through the Work Group and Sony Records. Produced by Mumble C, Fisher, and Big King, it features guest appearances from Biz Markie, Kurtis Blow, and C.C. DeVille of Poison. Three singles were released from the album: "Steal My Sunshine", "Feelin' Alright", and "Cryptik Souls Crew". The album cover features Canadian rapper Buck 65.

You Can't Stop the Bum Rush received generally positive reviews from music critics, who praised the album's genre-hopping and light-hearted delivery. Commercially, it peaked at number 32 on the Canadian Top Albums/CDs chart, number 177 on the UK Albums Chart, and number 46 on the US Billboard 200; it ranked at number 185 on the latter's year-end chart. It was certified gold by Music Canada and the Recording Industry Association of America (RIAA).

== Background and composition ==
Before releasing You Can't Stop the Bum Rush, Len had built a fan base in Canada by independently releasing one extended play (EP) and two albums on its own record label. During this period, the duo became tired of producing rock music and considered disbanding. Marc explained: "I was writing, then I thought, 'This is bullshit; I can't write this shit'. I hated playing guitar". The duo, however, became inspired again after experimenting with hip-hop, opting to move in this direction after receiving positive reception from music industry officials. The group later signed with Work Group, a major record label. At the time, Len's lineup included siblings Marc Costanzo and Sharon Costanzo alongside additional members Derek "D. Rock" MacKenzie, Brian "DJ Moves" Higgins, Philip "Planet Pea" Rae, and Drunkness Monster.

The standard edition of You Can't Stop the Bum Rush includes 12 tracks; the Japanese edition includes one additional track. Len intended to create a sonically diverse album, with Marc Costanzo commenting: "We didn't want people to be mad at us when they bought the album and expected 13 'Sunshines'. There's something [on the album] for the ravers, the Adidas-wearing old-school hip-hop heads, and 14-year-old girls". The album includes a variety of styles, including rap, rock, and pop. It makes heavy use of samples, with band member D Rock commenting that "[we] don't take ourselves too seriously". The album features guest appearances from Biz Markie, Kurtis Blow, and C.C. DeVille of Poison.

== Title and artwork ==
The title, You Can't Stop the Bum Rush, refers to breaking down barricades, with D Rock commenting that the idea behind it is that "[Len is] coming, you can't stop us". However, the group maintains that the title was created as a joke, with D Rock further adding: "[Len is] the first Canadian band with no talent whatsoever to actually make it to Letterman".

Len was responsible for the album's art direction, while Drazen helmed the cartoon artwork. The cover features cartoon versions of the Len group members, in addition to alternative hip-hop musician Buck 65, lined up on a city sidewalk. The idea for the cover stemmed from a conversation between Marc and Sharon, in which Marc discussed "how funny it would be if we [became] cartoon characters". Outside of the cover, Drazen drew a city—referred to by Marc as "Len land"—containing other eccentric characters, which is placed throughout the CD booklet. The cover was originally a photograph that Marc took of himself and Sharon, although it was scrapped as Marc believed it would fail to grab consumer attention. The Work Group was strongly against the decision to release the album using Drazen's cartoon artwork.

== Release and promotion ==
To promote You Can't Stop the Bum Rush, Len headlined the Canadian Edgefest tour in 1999, replacing Eve 6 after they dropped out due to illness. The tour lasted two weeks, from July 1 to 14. In the United States, Len embarked on a tour consisting of 22 shows in the fall of 1999. The tour commenced on October 7 in Chicago, Illinois, and concluded on November 6 in Dallas, Texas, with most appearances at clubs and music festivals. It was initially scheduled to begin on July 27 in Washington, D.C., although the Len group members had difficulty securing the proper visa paperwork in time for the date. To promote the album further, Len made a variety of radio and television appearances, including an August 6 appearance on the Late Show with David Letterman.

== Reception ==
Professional ratings
Review scores
Source	Rating
AllMusic	4/5 stars
Q	3/5 stars
Robert Christgau	(1-star Honorable Mention)
Rolling Stone	3/5 stars

John Bush of AllMusic found the rapping on You Can't Stop the Bum Rush offbeat and the album a lesser version of the Beastie Boys's Hello Nasty, but said that the production was "excellent" and the tracks "enjoyable", concluding that "the album's few derivative qualities never really get in the way of an enjoyable listen". Tony Scherman of The New York Times credited the album for offering more than just "Steal My Sunshine" by dabbling in different genres, highlighting the four hip-hop songs for their sunny demeanor, concluding that: "Any unheralded group that cuts an album with at least a half-dozen memorable songs, and two addictive ones, deserves special attention".

Robert Christgau cited "Beautiful Day" and "Cheekybugger" as highlights of You Can't Stop the Bum Rush. Karen Schoemer of Rolling Stone praised Marc Costanzo for his versatile production and for offering an alternative to Fred Durst by being goofy and less serious, concluding that: "Twelve years ago, these guys might have been Camper Van Beethoven, taking the piss out of college rock. Today, another genre needs them more". Mark Jenkins of The Washington Post praised "Steal My Sunshine" but criticized the rest of the album for failing to recreate its appeal. Commercially, You Can't Stop the Bum Rush peaked at number 32 on the Canadian Top Albums/CDs chart, number 177 on the UK Albums Chart, and number 46 on the US Billboard 200; it ranked at number 185 on the latter's year-end chart. It was certified gold by Music Canada and the Recording Industry Association of America (RIAA).

== Track listing ==
All tracks are produced by Mumble C, except where noted.

Standard edition
No.	Title	Writer(s)	Producer(s)	Length
1.	"Steal My Sunshine"	Marc Costanzo; Gregg Diamond		4:25
2.	"Cryptik Souls Crew"	M. Costanzo; Philip Rae; Tony Camillo		4:24
3.	"Man of the Year"	M. Costanzo; Brian Higgins; Derek Mackenzie		5:07
4.	"Beautiful Day"	M. Costanzo; Higgins; Mackenzie; Felix Cavaliere; Eddie Brigati	Fisher; Big King	2:46
5.	"The Hard Disk Approach"	M. Costanzo; Felix Wittholz; Brendan Canning		3:04
6.	"Hot Rod Monster Jam"	M. Costanzo; Luigi Creatore; George David Weiss; Hugo Peretti; Berry Gordy; William Robinson; Sylvia Robinson; Melvin Glover		4:07
7.	"Cold Chillin'"	M. Costanzo; Mackenzie; Kurtis Walker		3:26
8.	"Feelin' Alright"	M. Costanzo; Mackenzie; Sharon Costanzo; Michael Bruce; Spencer Lynn Kirkpatrick		3:59
9.	"Cheekybugger"	M. Costanzo		1:44
10.	"Big Meanie"	M. Costanzo; Grover Washington Jr.		4:07
11.	"Junebug"	M. Costanzo		4:00
12.	"Crazy 'Cause I Believe (Early Morning Sunshine)"	M. Costanzo; David Wilson; Fred Werner		3:00
Total length:				44:09

Japanese edition
No.	Title	Writer(s)	Length
13.	"Drunc'n Moves"	M. Costanzo; Mark Mackay; Higgins	2:55
Total length:			47:04

=== Notes ===
- "Steal My Sunshine" embodies portions of "More, More, More" by Andrea True Connection.
- "Cryptik Souls Crew" contains elements from "Dynomite" by Bazuka and "Let's Have Some Fun" by The Bar-Kays.
- "Beautiful Day" embodies portions of "A Girl Like You" by John Travolta.
- "Hot Rod Monster Jam" contains a sample from "The Lion Sleeps Tonight" by The Tokens and "White Lines (Don't Don't Do It)" by Melle Mel; it embodies portions of "Shop Around" by The Miracles and "Do Your Duty" by Beat Master Clay.
- "Cold Chillin'" contains a sample from "Pimpin' Ain't Easy" by Big Daddy Kane and "You Gots to Chill" by EPMD.
- "Feelin' Alright" embodies portions of "Let Me Down Easy" by Hydra.
- "Big Meanie" embodies portions of "Hydra" by Grover Washington Jr.

== Credits and personnel ==
Credits are adapted from the album's liner notes.

=== Cryptik Souls Crew ===
- Obe One
- Vandal
- Abs
- Asicks
- KNG

=== Artwork ===
- Len – art direction
- Helios – design and layout
- Drazen – cartoon art
- Stephen Chung – photo art

=== Management ===
- Jonathan Simkin (Simkin & Co.) – lawyer
- Graeme Lowe and Jon Leshay (Storefront Entertainment, LLC.) – management
- Phil Cassens – A&R
- Barbara Bausman – product manager
- Julie Chamberlain – production coordinator

=== Musicians ===
- Moka Only – vocals (on tracks 2 and 12)
- Matt Kelly – guitar (on tracks 1 and 10)
- Felix Wittholz – vocals (on track 5)
- Brendan Canning – keyboard (on track 5)
- C.C. DeVille – guitar (on track 8)
- Larry Ciancia – drums (on track 8)
- Mike Catano – drums (on track 9)
- Suzie Katayama – string arrangement and cello (on tracks 10 and 11)
- David Stenske – viola (on tracks 10 and 11)
- Michael McCarty – drum sounds

=== Additional musicians ===
- Tom Biederman – trumpet (on tracks 11 and 12)
- David Biederman – sax (on tracks 11 and 12)
- Andrew Thompson – guitar (on tracks 11 and 12)
- Dave Leitad – Rhodes keyboard (on tracks 11 and 12)
- Eve Butler – violin (on track 11)
- Kori Ayukawa – bass (on track 12)
- Wilson Laurencin – drums (on track 12)

== Charts ==
=== Weekly charts ===
Weekly chart performance for You Can't Stop the Bum Rush
Chart (1999)	Peak position
Canada Top Albums/CDs (RPM)	32
UK Albums (Official Charts)	177
US Billboard 200	46

=== Year-end charts ===
Year-end chart performance for You Can't Stop the Bum Rush
Chart (1999)	Position
US Billboard 200	185

== Certifications and sales ==
Certifications for You Can't Stop the Bum Rush
Region	Certification	Certified units/sales
Canada (Music Canada)	Gold	50,000^{^}
United States (RIAA)	Gold	500,000^{^}
^{^} Shipments figures based on certification alone.
