= Stigg of the Dump =

- Origin: Halifax, Nova Scotia
- Genres: Underground hip hop
- Occupation: Producer
- Instrument: Sampler
- Years active: 2002–present
- Labels: Endemik Music; Mush Records

Stigg of the Dump is an underground hip hop producer based in Halifax, Nova Scotia.

== History ==
Stigg of the Dump released the debut EP, Still Alive at the Veglia Lounge, on Endemik Music in 2002.

He is one half of the instrumental hip hop group Villain Accelerate. The duo released an album, Maid of Gold, on Mush Records in 2003.

== Discography ==
=== Albums ===
- Maid of Gold (2003) (with Sixtoo, as Villain Accelerate)

=== EPs ===
- Still Alive at the Veglia Lounge (2002)
