= The Music Scene (album) =

Studio album by Blockhead
- Released: November 3, 2009
- Genres: Instrumental hip-hop; electronic
- Length: 1:03:19
- Label: Ninja Tune
- Producer: Blockhead

Blockhead chronology
Uncle Tony's Coloring Book (2007)	The Music Scene (2009)	Interludes After Midnight (2012)

The Music Scene is the fourth solo studio album by American hip-hop producer Blockhead. It was released on November 3, 2009, via Ninja Tune, marking his third album for the label.

== Critical reception ==
Professional ratings
Aggregate scores
Source	Rating
AnyDecentMusic?	6.3/10
Metacritic	75/100
Review scores
Source	Rating
AllMusic	4/5 stars
Beats Per Minute	69/100%
Consequence of Sound	C−
HipHopDX	4/5
laut.de	4/5 stars
musicOMH	4/5 stars
PopMatters	7/10
RapReviews	7/10
The Irish Times	3/5 stars

The Music Scene was met with generally favourable reviews from music critics. At Metacritic, which assigns a normalized rating out of 100 to reviews from mainstream publications, the album received an average score of 75, based on nine reviews. The aggregator AnyDecentMusic? has the critical consensus of the album at a 6.3 out of 10, also based on nine reviews.

AllMusic's Rick Anderson praised the album, saying "everyone makes sample-based music these days, but very few people use found sounds and prefab musical snippets as creatively and thoughtfully as Blockhead does". Ben Hogwood of musicOMH described the music as "eclectic, calming and yet strangely energetic", writing that it is well worth getting acquainted with. Mike Schiller of PopMatters wrote: "parts of The Music Scene flirt with and even achieve greatness, standing tall as instrumentals any music fan would be advised to hear. Regrettably, the tracks in the box labeled "same old Blockhead" stick out amongst such greatness, keeping the album from achieving same". Patrick Taylor of RapReviews called it "a good album, but one that is hard to get excited about". Arika Dean of Beats Per Minute wrote: "The Music Scene is not likely to be his magnum opus, and perhaps it will never be anyone's favorite hip-hop/electronica album. Still, it is an important step in the right direction for Blockhead, and that stands for something".

In his mixed review for The Irish Times, Jim Carroll stated that Blockhead "turns to Ableton software to juggle multiple samples and stitch them into an enthralling narrative".

== Track listing ==
All tracks are written by James Anthony Simon, except tracks 3, 7, 8 and 10 co-written with Damien Paris.

No.	Title	Length
1.	"It's Raining Clouds"	5:54
2.	"The Music Scene"	4:49
3.	"Only Sequences Change"	4:44
4.	"Which One of You Jerks Drank My Arnold Palmer?"	4:48
5.	"Attack the Doctor"	5:46
6.	"The Prettiest Sea Slug"	4:35
7.	"The Daily Routine"	6:48
8.	"Tricky Turtle"	4:38
9.	"Four Walls"	5:42
10.	"Pity Party"	4:22
11.	"Hell Camp"	4:37
12.	"Farewell Spaceman"	6:35
Total length:		1:03:19

== Personnel ==
- James Anthony "Blockhead" Simon – producer
- Damien Paris – guitar (tracks: 7, 9), bass (tracks: 3, 7, 8, 10)
- Wilder Zoby – vocoder (track 9)
- Justin "DJ Signify" Levy – turntables (tracks: 1, 12), co-producer (track 11)
- Baby Dayliner – mixing
- Kevin Metcalfe – mastering
- Owen Brozman – artwork
- Matt Rota – color, design
