= Maid of Gold =

Studio album by Villain Accelerate
- Released: August 12, 2003
- Studio: Mexican Vampire Studios, Montreal, Canada
- Genre: Instrumental hip hop
- Length: 53:24
- Label: Mush Records
- Producer: Sixtoo; Stigg of the Dump

Maid of Gold is the only studio album by Villain Accelerate, a Canadian hip hop production duo consisting of Sixtoo and Stigg of the Dump. It was released on Mush Records on August 12, 2003.

== Critical reception ==
Professional ratings
Review scores
Source	Rating
AllMusic	3/5 stars
Exclaim!	mixed
HipHopDX	6/10
The Milk Factory	4.7/5
Splendid Magazine	mixed
Tiny Mix Tapes	4/5 stars

Jason MacNeil of AllMusic gave the album 3 stars out of 5, writing, "This album is a bizarre and challenging blend of effects, styles, and eerie feel that seeps into the listener early on." J-23 of HipHopDX gave the album a 6 out of 10, stating that "Maid of Gold is pretty straight forward, plenty of hard-hitting, rigid drums surrounded by various dark and moody samples." He added, "Most of the tracks don't vary much as they play and the murky atmosphere remains consistent." Noel Dix of Exclaim! wrote, "Using quiet drum sequences and a lot of piano and live instrumentation, Maid of Gold is a very low-key affair and sometimes fails to grab your attention as it can be easy to nod off and let yourself become distracted as the beats could be drowned out by a whisper." Chadwicked of Tiny Mix Tapes gave the album 4 stars out of 5, saying, "Atmospheric noises lead into songs, prior to layers of bass, guitar, piano, and other random instruments which gracefully get placed into the mix." He added, "Sixtoo and Stigg exhibit cohesive sample layering, done so well that it rivals that of Mr. Josh Davis."

== Track listing ==
All tracks are written by Sixtoo and Stigg of the Dump.

No.	Title	Length
1.	"Table of Context"	4:48
2.	"Maid of Gold"	4:56
3.	"Things Told"	5:24
4.	"Paper, Boxcutter, Rock"	3:41
5.	"Postcards"	5:01
6.	"Duppies"	2:15
7.	"Cracktivity"	4:04
8.	"Revisit"	2:07
9.	"Herd Whispers"	2:39
10.	"Rookie Card"	2:12
11.	"Worried.Look"	2:42
12.	"Laurels Canyon"	3:24
13.	"Pitch.Control"	2:11
14.	"Surgery"	3:35
15.	"Verify"	1:55
16.	"When I Was Your Age"	2:20
Total length:		53:24

== Personnel ==
Credits adapted from liner notes.

- Sixtoo – production, recording, compiling, mixing
- Stigg of the Dump – production, recording, compiling, mixing
- P-Love – turntables (1, 4, 9, 11, 12), Rhodes piano (3, 9, 11, 14, 16)
- Matt Kelly – guitar (2, 3, 9), bass guitar (9)
- Shane Ward – bass guitar (2)
- Warren Spicer – bass guitar (5), Rhodes piano (5)
- Other – illustration
