= Steal My Sunshine =

1999 single by Len

Single by Len

from the album You Can't Stop the Bum Rush
- B-side: "It's Down to This"; "Drunc'n Moves"
- Released: June 22, 1999
- Studio: Four Ways
- Genre: Indie pop; dance-pop; alternative pop; bubblegum pop
- Length: 4:25 (album version); 3:30 (single version)
- Label: Work; Columbia
- Songwriters: Marc Costanzo; Gregg Diamond
- Producer: Mumble C

Len singles chronology
"Trillion Daze" (1997)	"Steal My Sunshine" (1999)	"Feelin' Alright" (1999)

Music video
- "Steal My Sunshine" on YouTube

"Steal My Sunshine" is a song by Canadian alternative rock band Len from their third studio album, You Can't Stop the Bum Rush (1999). The song was initially released on the soundtrack to the 1999 crime comedy film Go, which resulted in the song receiving heavy airplay. It was later released to contemporary hit radio as the lead single from You Can't Stop the Bum Rush on June 22, 1999, by Work Group. The song's backing is built around a sample of the Andrea True Connection's 1976 single "More, More, More", and that song's writer Gregg Diamond is credited as a cowriter with Len's singer Marc Costanzo; this was a posthumous writing credit for Diamond, who died three months before the album's release. Costanzo produced the song under the stage name Mumble C. He said the song was about feelings of elation he experienced while attending an outdoor electronic music festival.

The song was recorded at Four Ways Studio B and mixed by John King of the Dust Brothers at One on One South in Los Angeles. "Steal My Sunshine" was one of the first demos recorded for You Can't Stop the Bum Rush, although the song almost remained unreleased due to it not making much of an impression on the band. An indie pop and dance-pop song, "Steal My Sunshine" features siblings Marc and Sharon Costanzo trading lead vocals. The song was written during a period in which the siblings were not speaking to each other.

"Steal My Sunshine" received positive reviews from music critics, who praised its sample usage and considered the song a quintessential summer hit. "Steal My Sunshine" peaked at number three on the RPM 100 Hit Tracks chart. Len is often deemed a one-hit wonder. Outside Canada, "Steal My Sunshine" peaked within the top ten of the charts in Australia, Ireland, the Netherlands, the United Kingdom and the United States. The song remains Len's most successful single, being certified platinum by the Recording Industry Association of America (RIAA), the Australian Recording Industry Association (ARIA), and the British Phonographic Industry (BPI).

== Background ==
Marc Costanzo went to a rave during a time when he and his sister Sharon had gone several months without speaking. While out, he was listening to old disco music with Brendan Canning, and heard the 1976 disco hit "More, More, More". Marc decided to loop part of the song's bridge and wrote and composed "Steal My Sunshine" over the instrumental. The song was recorded on a vintage early 1980s 8-track 1/2 inch recorder. Marc stated that "Steal My Sunshine" did not make much of an impression on him, so Len did not originally plan to release it. The master recording remained under his bed for months.

When producing "Steal My Sunshine", Marc Costanzo wanted to make a song similar to the Human League's 1981 synth-pop single "Don't You Want Me". As a result, the song's structure is characterized by alternating between male and female vocals from Marc and Sharon. Costanzo has explained that the lyrics were about the aforementioned rave and the events that took place there.

== Production ==
The recording sessions for "Steal My Sunshine" took place at Four Ways Studio B. Production on the song was helmed by Marc Costanzo under the stage name Mumble C, with Costanzo also acting as a recording engineer. Recorded in 1996 on an eight-track tape, the song was one of the first demos recorded for You Can't Stop the Bum Rush. When speaking to The Washington Post, Sharon Costanzo described the recording sessions as being relaxed. She commented: "Marc just dragged me out of bed and into the studio one morning and said, 'Do you want to sing on this?' ... And as soon as we recorded the song, it was done for me. We both liked it, but then I never thought about it again." John King of the Dust Brothers mixed the track at One on One South.

== Composition ==
"Steal My Sunshine"
A 26-second sample of Len's "Steal My Sunshine" song where the chorus is played. Marc and Sharon Costanzo trade the verses

The song is written in the key of E major, in common time with a tempo of 95 beats per minute. Marc and Sharon Costanzo's vocal range spans one octave, from G♯_{4} to G♯_{5}. Marc described the song as a "fun piece of pop with a bit of rap and disco thrown in."

== Release ==
"Steal My Sunshine" was included on the soundtrack to Go, which was released on March 30, 1999, by Sony Music Entertainment. It received heavy airplay as a result, causing Sony's subsidiary The WORK Group to push the album's release date from mid-June 1999 to May 25, 1999. The song became Len's most successful, reaching the top 10 on the US Billboard Hot 100 in September 1999. It reached the top 10 on the Adult Top 40, Modern Rock Tracks, Top 40 Mainstream, and Top 40 Tracks charts. At the 2000 Juno Awards, "Steal My Sunshine" was nominated for "Best Single" but lost to the Tragically Hip's "Bobcaygeon". Harriet Gibsone commented this song's lyrics: "The song is held together with a simple, sugary-sweet chorus, but its raspy, rambling and drug-addled verses have more in common with hip-hop or metal than mainstream pop. Sharon's part, in particular, is bamboozling."

== Reception ==
Critics gave "Steal My Sunshine" positive reviews. Larry Flick from Billboard wrote, "It's hard to imagine that no one has thought of using the instrumental hook of (...) "More, More, More" to beef up a new concoction. Here, however, the quintet Len does so to grand effect. Somewhere between pop and modern rock, this all-about-summer track-featuring a back-and-forth male-to-female vocal-is uplifting, clever, and instantly appealing. Its melody line, verse construction, and memorable hook make for what should be an absolute breakthrough for this hip, talented act." Rob Brunner of Entertainment Weekly rated it a B+, describing it as a 1990s "Don't You Want Me" with a "smiley groove and alternating male/female vocals". For The Village Voice, Richard Riegel described the song's beat as "McCoy Tyner playing the Kraftwerk songbook, outlined in aural neon." In 2000, The Morning Call compared "Steal My Sunshine" to Dynamite Hack's acoustic cover of N.W.A's "Boyz-N-The-Hood", referring to both as "novelty faux hip hop" songs. In her review for Rolling Stone, Karen Schoemer compared Sharon Costanzo's vocals to Josie and the Pussycats. The publication listed "Steal My Sunshine" tenth on its list of the best singles of 1999. The song was listed third on the 1999 Pazz and Jop list, a survey of several hundred music critics conducted by Robert Christgau.

Retrospectively, the single garnered high praise from AllMusic's Stephen Thomas Erlewine: "Then, there's Len's 'Steal My Sunshine,' as perfect as songs get. This sun-kissed, sun-bleached blend of hip-hop, pop, disco, post-Beastie Boys cleverness and California culture is a priceless, timeless confection that instantly calls up sweltering, shimmering beaches the second the looped keyboard plays. It's a monumentally great single...put it this way, if 'Steal My Sunshine' was the last song I ever heard on this earth, I'd die happy — and it shows that mainstream pop can truly be transcendent."

In 2007, Stylus Magazine ranked the song 13th on its list of the top 50 one-hit wonders, stating that it "perfectly captured that warm, lazy feeling you get when late summer still seems like it could last forever." In 2013, Rolling Stone magazine placed "Steal My Sunshine" at number 33 on their list of the "Best Summer Songs of All Time".

== Music video ==
The song's music video—which uses the shorter "album edit" of the song, as featured on the single—was jointly directed by Marc Costanzo and Bradley Walsh under the respective stage names "The Burger Pimp" and "B-Rad". When Len had signed to Work Records, one of its demands was to be able to direct its own videos. The group used a $100,000 budget to make the video. They flew to Daytona Beach, Florida with two dozen friends while the area was crowded with people on their spring vacations. They spent much of the budget on alcohol, buying so much that they broke their hotel's elevator trying to lift it. They shot the video in the afternoon so that they could recover from hangovers in the morning and drink in the evening. The scenes were shot without a script or storyboard. In the video, Len and friends are shown relaxing together and riding on scooters, go-karts, and jet skis.

Motorrad, whose scooters were included in the music video, later held a promotion giving away scooters of the same model. At the 1999 MuchMusic Video Awards, "Steal My Sunshine" won awards for Best Video, Best Pop Video, and Favourite Canadian Video.

== Track listings and formats ==
- UK CD1
1. "Steal My Sunshine" (Album Edit) – 3:30
2. "It's Down to This" – 4:04
3. "Drunc'n Moves" – 2:55
- UK CD2
1. "Steal My Sunshine" – 4:08
2. "Steal My Sunshine" (Skyjump Club Edit) – 7:19
3. "Steal My Sunshine" (Version Idjut) – 7:51
- UK 12-inch vinyl
1. "Steal My Sunshine" (Skyjump Club Edit) – 7:19
2. "Steal My Sunshine" (More and More Instrumental) – 6:45
3. "Steal My Sunshine" (Album Version) – 3:55
4. "Steal My Sunshine" (Version Idjut) – 7:51
5. "Steal My Sunshine" (Bougie Soliterre Remix) – 6:12
6. "Steal My Sunshine" (Neon Phusion Remix) – 5:24
- UK cassette single and European CD single
1. "Steal My Sunshine" (Album Version) – 3:55
2. "Steal My Sunshine" (Neon Phusion Remix) – 5:24
- US 12-inch vinyl
1. "Steal My Sunshine" (Steal My Club Mix) – 6:19
2. "Steal My Sunshine" (Skyjump Club Edit) – 7:19
3. "Steal My Sunshine" (Steal My Club Mix Instrumental) – 6:19
4. "Steal My Sunshine" (More and More Instrumental) – 6:30
- European maxi
1. "Steal My Sunshine" (Album Edit) – 3:30
2. "Steal My Sunshine" (Skyjump Club Edit) – 7:19
3. "Steal My Sunshine" (Version Idjut) – 7:51
4. "Steal My Sunshine" (Bougie Soliterre Remix) – 6:12
- Australian maxi
1. "Steal My Sunshine" (Album Version) – 4:01
2. "Steal My Sunshine" (Skyjump Club Edit) – 7:19
3. "Steal My Sunshine" (Bougie Soliterre Remix) – 6:12
4. "Steal My Sunshine" (Neon Phusion Remix) – 5:24
- Remixes, Vol. 1
1. "Steal My Sunshine" (Junior Sanchez NJ Deep Mix) – 6:00
2. "Steal My Sunshine" (Alexander Technique Darksun Remix - Jnr Edit) – 5:21
3. "Steal My Sunshine" (Gina Turner Remix) – 4:50
4. "Steal My Sunshine" (Remastered Version) – 3:31
- Remastered Anniversary Edition
1. "Steal My Sunshine" (Remastered Anniversary Edition) – 3:21
2. "Steal My Sunshine" (Remastered Anniversary Edition Instrumental) – 3:47
- California Realin' Remix
1. "Steal My Sunshine" (California Realin' Remix) – 3:48
2. "Steal My Sunshine" (Instrumental) – 3:27

== Credits and personnel ==
Credits are adapted from the You Can't Stop the Bum Rush album liner notes.

Personnel

- Marc Costanzo – vocals
- Sharon Costanzo – vocals
- Matt Kelly – guitar, spoken interlude
- Brendan Canning – spoken interlude

Technical

- Marc Costanzo – producer, engineer
- John King – mixing
- Chris Shaw – engineer
- Tom Banghart – assistant engineer
- David Mitson – mastering

== Charts ==
=== Weekly charts ===
Weekly chart performance for "Steal My Sunshine"
Chart (1999–2000)	Peak position
Australia (ARIA)	3
Canada Top Singles (RPM)	3
Canada Adult Contemporary (RPM)	10
Canada CHR (Nielsen BDS)	1
Europe (Eurochart Hot 100)	43
Iceland (Íslenski Listinn Topp 40)	33
Ireland (IRMA)	3
Netherlands (Dutch Top 40 Tipparade)	6
Netherlands (Single Top 100)	79
New Zealand (Recorded Music NZ)	34
Scottish Singles Sales (Official Charts)	6
Sweden (Sverigetopplistan)	28
UK Singles (Official Charts)	8
US Billboard Hot 100	9
US Adult Pop Airplay (Billboard)	7
US Alternative Airplay (Billboard)	5
US Pop Airplay (Billboard)	3
US Top 40 Tracks (Billboard)	3

=== Year-end charts ===
1999 year-end chart performance for "Steal My Sunshine"
Chart (1999)	Position
Canada Top Singles (RPM)	15
Canada Adult Contemporary (RPM)	74
UK Singles (OCC)	145
US Billboard Hot 100	78
US Adult Top 40 (Billboard)	39
US Mainstream Top 40 (Billboard)	37
US Modern Rock Tracks (Billboard)	28
US Top 40 Tracks (Billboard)	38

2000 year-end chart performance for "Steal My Sunshine"
Chart (2000)	Position
Australia (ARIA)	44
Ireland (IRMA)	77
UK Singles (OCC)	145
US Adult Top 40 (Billboard)	48
US Mainstream Top 40 (Billboard)	66

== Certifications and sales ==
Certifications for "Steal My Sunshine"
Region	Certification	Certified units/sales
Australia (ARIA)	Platinum	70,000^{^}
United Kingdom (BPI)	Platinum	600,000^{‡}
United States (RIAA)	Platinum	1,000,000^{‡}
^{^} Shipments figures based on certification alone.^{‡} Sales+streaming figures based on certification alone.

== Release history ==
Release dates and formats for "Steal My Sunshine"
Region	Date	Format(s)	Label(s)	Ref(s).
United States	June 22, 1999	Contemporary hit radio	Work	
United States	July 22, 1999	—N/a	Work	
United Kingdom	December 6, 1999	CD; cassette	Columbia	

== Covers ==
The Maine released a version featuring Derek Sanders along with a video in December 2015, and it was later included on their EP Covers in 2016. In 2019 British band Papernut Cambridge recorded a version of the song on their double album of cover versions, Nutlets II. In 2021, "Steal My Sunshine" was covered by American alternative rock band Portugal. The Man in collaboration with Cherry Glazerr frontwoman Clementine Creevy. In 2022, Australian band The Goon Sax covered the song, released in the deluxe edition of their 2021 album Mirror II. The song was featured in the 2018 animated movie Peter Rabbit, where an additional verse of lyrics were recorded by the band to suit the plot of the movie.

British musical artist Pixey and featured artist Tayo Sound released "Daisy Chain", which heavily employs a sample of "Steal My Sunshine", in 2023. Pixey explained that the song was intended as a summer anthem, feeling that it "perfectly captures the feeling of summer" and encapsulates her themes of nostalgia and sunshine.

In 2023, alternative rock band Eve 6 covered the song, which features L1ZY. It was only available to listen to on their Patreon, until it was released on streaming in February 2025.

Autotune rapper and singer T-Pain covered the song for a commercial for Lipton iced tea.
