= Marc Costanzo =

Canadian singer (born 1972)

- Born: Marc Francis Costanzo; August 1, 1972 (age 54); Montreal, Quebec, Canada
- Other name: Burger Pimp
- Occupations: Singer-songwriter; record producer; music publisher
- Years active: 1991–present
- Relatives: Sharon Costanzo (sister)
- Musical career
- Origin: Toronto, Ontario, Canada
- Genres: Alternative rock; indie pop; rap rock; hip hop
- Instruments: Vocals; guitar
- Labels: Funtrip Records; No; Work; Sony Music; EMI; Virgin; DreamWorks

Marc Francis Costanzo (born August 1, 1972) is a Canadian singer, musician, music publishing executive and the co-lead vocalist of the alternative rock group Len. Costanzo and his older sister, Sharon Costanzo, formed Len in 1991, although the group has featured a revolving lineup of touring and studio musicians since its formation. In 1999, they released their third album, You Can't Stop the Bum Rush, which went platinum in the US and featured the platinum-selling single "Steal My Sunshine".

== Early life ==
Born in Montreal, Costanzo moved with his family to Toronto in the early 1990s. He is of half Italian and half English descent.

== Music career ==
=== Len ===
Costanzo and his sister formed the pop duo Len in the early 1990s, and, with various touring and studio musicians, released several albums and singles over the next few years. The group self-released two studio albums, Superstar (1995) and Get Your Legs Broke (1997), through Costanzo's label, Funtrip Records. The band's third album, You Can't Stop the Bum Rush (1999), was more hip hop oriented, and Costanzo toured using the stage name Burger Pimp. Costanzo wrote several hits over the years, including "Steal My Sunshine", which Costanzo also produced and which contains samples of "More, More, More" by Andrea True Connection. Released as a single, "Steal My Sunshine" became an international hit and was nominated for a Juno Award in 2000.

Since then, they have released two more albums: The Diary of the Madmen (2005) and It's Easy If You Try (2012), but neither could duplicate the success of "Steal My Sunshine." In 2012, Costanzo appeared in the last Len video, "It's My Neighbourhood", featuring scenes of Toronto.

=== Publishing ===
Over the years, Marc has also been a music publishing executive and has owned several music publishing entities in the US and Canada, specializing in emerging artists and songwriters. Costanzo served as Senior Creative at EMI Music Publishing and signed a number of multi-platinum acts and writers, including Deryck Whibley from Sum 41 and Junior Sanchez, earning more than 20 gold and platinum Recording Industry Association of America certifications through the years.

His current venture, Inside Music Publishing, with offices in Toronto and Nashville, has interest and ownership of catalog publishing rights totaling more than 35 million albums sold.

== Accolades ==
Costanzo has won several awards, including three MMVA awards as a music video director, two as an artist, a Billboard Music Award, and several ASCAP awards as a songwriter. He was a co-composer of the song "Reckless", which won the 2007 International Songwriting Competition.
