= Roaming (film) =

- Film poster
- Directed by: Michael Ray Fox
- Written by: Michael Ray Fox
- Produced by: Richard MacQueen; Michael Melski; Craig Cameron
- Starring: Rhys Bevan-John; Cory Bowles; Ryan Doucette; Christina Cuffari; Sarah D. McCarthy; Martha Irving; Josh MacDonald; Daniel Lillford; Pasha Ebrahimi; Michael McPhee; Adam Bayne; Lauren Messervey; Charles T. Conrad; Joey Campbell; Veronica Reynolds
- Cinematography: Kyle Cameron; Cam Erais
- Edited by: Drew Wilson
- Music by: Chris Pauley
- Release date: September 16, 2012 (Atlantic Film Festival)
- Running time: 80 minutes
- Language: English
- Budget: $150,000 CAD

Roaming is a Canadian film written and directed by Michael Ray Fox and produced by Richard MacQueen, Michael Melski, and Craig Cameron. The film features Rhys Bevan-John, Cory Bowles, Daniel Lillford, Martha Irving, Josh MacDonald, Sarah D. McCarthy, and Christina Cuffari. Roaming was the first film to be produced through Telefilm Canada's First Feature Program which paved the way for Telefilm's Talent To Watch program.

== Release ==
Roaming opened the 2013 Toronto Independent Film Festival and was the Closing Night Gala film of the Silver Wave Film Festival. The film was distributed in Canada by Multiple Media Entertainment and All Channel Films and was released on Hulu, Indieflix, The Movie Network, Hollywood Suite, Bell TV OnDemand, and the National Film Board of Canada Canada Screens website. An incomplete version of "Roaming" originally screened at the 2012 Atlantic Film Festival. before its 2013 release.

== Reception ==
Roaming received generally positive reviews during its limited theatrical engagement exclusive to Atlantic Canada and received an award for Best Feature at the Toronto Independent Film Festival in 2013. Lead actor Rhys Bevan-John received the ACTRA Maritimes Award for Outstanding Male Performance for his portrayal of Will. Josh MacDonald was nominated for the same award for his performance in Roaming and Martha Irving's performance in the film earned her an ACTRA Maritimes Award nomination for Outstanding Female Performance.
