= Bully Records =

- Founded: 2002
- Founder: Marc-Olivier Boileau
- Genre: Hip hop
- Country of origin: Canada
- Location: Montreal, Quebec
- Official website: bullyrecords.com

Bully Records was an independent record label founded in 2002 in Montreal. It is maintained, funded, and run by Marc-Olivier Boileau (Marco). The label first released mostly 7-inch singles and EPs, but has since expanded to release CDs, box sets, and DVDs.

Most of Bully's lineup consists mainly of hip hop producers. They have since branched out and released the work of instrumentalists from many different genres.

One example of their projects is Obsession, a compilation of rare psychedelic music from countries such as Peru, Turkey, India, Brazil, Uruguay and Argentina. It was compiled by Mike Davis, owner of Academy Records in New York City.

== Discography ==
=== 7" singles ===
Album information
D Styles – Beautiful Fog
- Released: April 2007
- Abstract: D Styles first appearance on Bully.
Joe Beats – Fade
- Released: March 2007
- Abstract: Lead single from Joe Beats' Bully debut, Diverse Recourse.
Speed Bike – A Swimmer In The Ocean
- Released: June 2006
- Abstract: Speed Bike's first release on Bully.
Maker – Elephant Strut
- Released: April 2006
- Abstract: Producer of Glue's first release on Bully.
Meaty Ogre – Carne Asade
- Released: April 2006
- Abstract: Galapagos4 producer Meaty Ogre's first release on Bully
Buddy Peace – Bully Projects
- Released: February 2006
- Abstract: Buddy Peace's Bully mega mix.
Matt Kelly - Hiroshima
- Released: October 2005
- Abstract: Matt Kelly's second Bully release.
Dj Moves – A Sad State Of Affairs
- Released: August 2005
- Abstract: Dj Moves' first Bully release
Elektro 4 – Keystroke One Selections
- Released: July 2005
- Abstract: Selections from Elektro 4's debut LP on Bully, Keystroke One.
Sixtoo – Krunk's Not Dead
- Released: May 2005
- Abstract: Sixtoo's fourth appearance on Bully.
Matt Young & Carlo – Split 7-inch
- Released: February 2005
- Abstract: Matt Young's second Bully appearance.
P Love – Rocket Launch Test
- Released: December 2004
- Abstract: P Love's second Bully Release.
Elektro 4 – Tell Her
- Released: September 2004
- Abstract: Elektro 4's lead 7-inch single for his debut album, Keystroke 1.
Scott Matellic – Ring Finger
- Released: September 2004
- Abstract: Scott Matellic's first Bully release.
Moodswing 9 – The Den
- Released: July 2004
- Abstract: Moodswing 9's second Bully release.
Matt Young – Illy Uno
- Released: April 2004
- Abstract: Matt Young's first release.
DJ Signify – Unclean Volume 1
- Released: January 2004
- Abstract: Dj Signify's first release on Bully.
P Love – Fob Lights
- Released: October 2003
- Abstract: P-love's debut release on Bully.
Moodswing 9 – Reflection of Progress
- Released: September 2003
- Abstract: The beat man behind anticon's best work returns for 7-inch number 1.
Sixtoo & Matth – He Did Glass Music
- Released: January 2003
- Abstract: Sixtoo vs, Matth on Bully's debut 7-inch.

=== EPs ===
Album information
Colmar Crew – Take The Fire EP
- Released: April 2006
- Abstract: Double 7-inch from Colmar Crew.
Simahlak – Sons Of Sakubara EP
- Released: February 2006
- Abstract: Double 7-inch from Simahlak.
Sixtoo – Next EP
- Released: January 2006
- Abstract: Sixtoo again with a double 7-inch on Bully.
Sixtoo & Norsola – Homages EP
- Released: September 2005
- Abstract: Double 7-inch from Sixtoo and Norsola from Godspeed, You Black Emperor.
Controller 7 – The Egg EP
- Released: August 2005
- Abstract: Controller 7's second EP release on Bully.
Matt Kelly & P Love – Quasi Alteractions
- Released: April 2005
- Abstract: P Love's second Bully appearance and Matt Kelly's first EP.
Sixtoo & Dj Signify – Noone Leaves EP
- Released: March 2005
- Abstract: Sixtoo and Dj Signify on this double 7-inch.
Controller 7 - Expansion
- Released: August 2003
- Abstract: Double 7-inch EP from producer Controller 7.
Simahlak vs. Sixtoo – All Star Battle
- Released: March 2003
- Abstract: Sixtoo and Simahlak go head to head on Bully release number 2. Double 7-inch.

=== Albums ===
Album information
DJ Signify - Of Cities
- Released: January 2009
- Abstract:
Joe Beats – Diverse Recourse
- Released: April 2007
- Abstract: Joe Beats' first Bully release.
Matt Kelly - Peridot
- Released: September 2006
- Abstract: Matt Kelly's debut LP.
Silver Apples – The Garden
- Released: September 2006
- Abstract:
Other – Fight Book
- Released: March 2006
- Abstract: Triple cd from Sixtoo.
P Love – All Up In Your Mind
- Released: September 2005
- Abstract: P Love's debut LP.
Sixtoo - Duration
- Released: August 2005
- Abstract: Sixtoo's re-release of the infamous Duration.
Elektro 4 – Keystroke One
- Released: June 2005
- Abstract: Elektro 4's debut album.
Bully Records – Lunch Money Singles
- Released: April 2004
- Abstract: Compilation CD of select Bully 7-inch releases.

=== DVDs ===
Album information
Dead Space
- Released: April 2007
- Abstract: Bully's first DVD release documents veteran Parisian graffiti writer Psyckoze and his experience in the Catacombs of Paris over the last 22 years.
