= Villain Accelerate =

Canadian instrumental hip hop duo

- Origin: Canada
- Genres: Instrumental hip hop
- Years active: 2003–present
- Labels: Mush Records
- Members: Sixtoo; Stigg of the Dump
- Website: Official website

Villain Accelerate is a Canadian instrumental hip hop duo. It consists of underground hip hop artists Sixtoo and Stigg of the Dump. To date, the duo has released one album.

== History ==
Villain Accelerate released an album, Maid of Gold, on Mush Records in 2003. It was praised by The Milk Factory as "a stunning debut, twisting the natural perspective of hip-hop to open new doors and invade new spaces."

== Style and influences ==
The duo's style has been compared to Massive Attack, Portishead, and Unkle.

== Discography ==
Albums

- Maid of Gold (2003)
