= Uncle Tony's Coloring Book =

Studio album by Blockhead
- Released: August 14, 2007
- Studio: Ape Sauce Studios, Brooklyn, New York, U.S.
- Genre: Instrumental hip hop
- Length: 57:51
- Label: self-released
- Producer: Blockhead

Blockhead chronology
Downtown Science (2005)	Uncle Tony's Coloring Book (2007)	The Music Scene (2009)

Uncle Tony's Coloring Book is the third solo studio album by American hip hop producer Blockhead. It was released on August 14, 2007. The vinyl edition of the album was later released on Young Heavy Souls.

== Critical reception ==
Professional ratings
Review scores
Source	Rating
Exclaim!	favorable
PopMatters	6/10 stars
XLR8R	7.5/10

Noel Dix of Exclaim! wrote, "The New York producer mashes together a lot of rock licks, Bollywood breaks and children's records to make a diverse offering that keeps you paying attention and, more importantly, is fun to listen to." Scott Thill of XLR8R commented that "his ear for rump-shaking anthems is as tight as ever, which is why rappers are clamoring more to work with him."

== Track listing ==
No.	Title	Length
1.	"Coloring Book"	5:00
2.	"The Strain"	3:52
3.	"Grape Nuts and Chalk Sauce"	3:34
4.	"Duke of Hazzard"	4:02
5.	"Squirmy Worm"	4:32
6.	"Put Down Your Dream Journal and Dance"	5:04
7.	"The Hucklebuck Slice"	5:04
8.	"Not So OK Corral"	4:11
9.	"Do the Tron"	3:59
10.	"Get Your Regal On"	3:43
11.	"Cheer Up You're Not Dead Yet"	4:45
12.	"Trailer Love"	5:41
13.	"NYC Bounce"	4:24
Total length:		57:51

== Personnel ==
Credits adapted from the CD liner notes.

- Blockhead – production, arrangement
- Damien Paris – co-production (3), guitar (4, 8, 12, 13), bass guitar (1, 12), electronics (2), synthesizer (7, 10)
- DJ Signify – turntables (1, 4, 6, 12)
- Andrew Totolos – additional drums (2, 7, 8)
- Owen Brozman – artwork
- Bisc1 – layout
