= Jackals and Vipers in Envy of Man =

Studio album by Sixtoo
- Released: October 10, 2007
- Studios: Mt. Zoomer Studio, Montreal, Canada; Trix, Antwerp, Belgium
- Genre: Instrumental hip hop
- Length: 38:30
- Label: Ninja Tune
- Producer: Sixtoo

Sixtoo chronology
Chewing on Glass & Other Miracle Cures (2004)	Jackals and Vipers in Envy of Man (2007)

Jackals and Vipers in Envy of Man is a studio album by Canadian hip hop artist Sixtoo. It was released on Ninja Tune in 2007.

== Critical reception ==
Professional ratings
Review scores
Source	Rating
Chart Attack	mixed
Exclaim!	favorable
Impose	favorable
Pitchfork	5.5/10
The Skinny	4/5 stars

Nate Patrin of Pitchfork gave the album a 5.5 out of 10, saying, "Jackals and Vipers in Envy of Man is the kind of vague and incomplete music that, instead of immediately boring and/or frustrating you, has just enough intrigue to serve as what would seem to be reasonably unobtrusive background music." Noel Dix of Exclaim! said, "Sixtoo knows how to create moody landscapes and has managed to transfer them to his updated sound nicely." Jason Randall Smith of Impose described it as "a film score for the darker areas of life: long-standing regrets, ulterior motives, or the need to constantly look over your own shoulder."

On July 30, 2007, the album was included on XLR8R's "Office Top Ten Album Picks" list.

== Track listing ==
All tracks are written by Sixtoo.

No.	Title	Length
1.	"Part 1"	0:46
2.	"Part 2"	3:51
3.	"Part 3"	3:11
4.	"Part 4"	5:35
5.	"Part 5"	1:30
6.	"Part 6"	2:51
7.	"Part 7"	5:02
8.	"Part 8"	1:31
9.	"Part 9"	3:34
10.	"Part 10"	4:41
11.	"Part 11"	0:40
12.	"Part 12"	1:41
13.	"Part 13"	3:37
Total length:		38:30

== Personnel ==
Credits adapted from liner notes.

- Sixtoo – production, editing, recording
- Hadji Bakara – additional live programming
- Arlen Thompson – additional live recording
- Jef Neve – improvisational piano takes (4, 13)
- Jeremy Felker – illustration, drawings
