= Poko (TV series) =

- Genre: Children's animation
- Created by: Jeff Rosen
- Developed by: Jeff Rosen; Cheryl Wagner; Michael Donovan
- Written by: Jeff Rosen; Cheryl Wagner
- Directed by: Chuck Rubin
- Starring: Cory Bowles; Cameron Davidson
- Narrated by: Cory Bowles
- Opening theme: "Poko Theme Song"
- Ending theme: "Poko Theme Song" (instrumental)
- Country of origin: Canada
- Original language: English
- No. of seasons: 2
- No. of episodes: 52

Production
- Executive producers: Michael Donovan; Jeff Rosen
- Producer: Charles Bishop
- Animator: Thea Pratt
- Running time: 25 minutes
- Production companies: Salter Street Films (Season 1) (Note: As Eraser Dog Productions Incorporated); Alliance Atlantis; Halifax Film Company (Season 2)

Original release
- Network: CBC Television
- Release: June 9, 2003 – May 25, 2006

Poko is a Canadian stop motion animated children's television series about a young boy, his pet dog, and his toy monkey. Produced in Nova Scotia by The Halifax Film Company, Poko was created by Jeff Rosen, and began production in 2003 and ended in 2006 after three production cycles. Poko aired in Canada on CBC Television in the Kids' CBC programming block. It was narrated by actor and dancer Cory Bowles.

The show was awarded the 2004 Gemini for Best Pre-school Program in 2003 and the Alliance for Children & Television (ACT) Grand Prize in 2007.

== Characters ==
=== Main ===
- Poko is a little boy who, every day, plays in his bedroom, or out in his backyard, but he also has a magic finger. When he says "Poko pippity pop!", he can draw objects, which then become real, by tracing them in the air with his finger. Poko often encounters obstacles and gets cranky or upset, but then cheers up with the help of an unseen narrator. Voiced by Cameron Davidson.
- Minus is Poko's pet dog. He is very playful and mischievous, and often causes trouble. Minus is named for the sign minus (–); while not always understanding what's going on, he is sometimes showing much more human-like behavior, such as being able to walk on his hind feet, play soccer, or dance. He is named for his ability to erase Poko's creations from existence (when they aren't needed anymore or he doesn't like them, making Poko get upset) by using his nose like an eraser. His silly antics often cause Poko to laugh and say "Silly Minus!"
- Mr. Murphy is Poko's stuffed toy monkey, who usually just sits around. He can sometimes be seen to have moved his hands (such as to shrug, or cover his eyes), but is never seen actually moving.

=== Recurring ===
- Bibi is a little girl who is Poko's friend. She comes over sometimes to have a play date with Poko. Bibi can use her magic sticker book in a way that resembles Poko's ability, by opening the book to a sticker of an object and then making that object real, while saying "Bibi bibbity bop!". Bibi first appeared in the second season. Voiced by Claudia Ottosen.

== Show structure ==
The show follows the same sequence in every episode:

- Title sequence
- Poko wakes up (longer version only in season 1)
- Indoor episode
- Play sequence
- Mighty Murph story (season 1); Poko's Playhouse (season 2)
- Play sequence
- Outdoors episode
- Play sequence
- Ending sequence

=== Episodes ===
Each episode features two segments. The first one is indoors, after Poko wakes up. The second is outdoors, in the garden. In both, Poko encounters a problem, but usually overcomes it after observing a smaller creature (such as a bird, ladybug, worm, etc.) solving a similar problem.

Also beneficial to children, the narrator helps Poko to name and understand his feelings, and find appropriate ways to deal with them: for example, on some occasions, when Poko has become angry at Minus, he has gone and given a blast on his tuba to release his frustration. Another common solution is for Poko to give Mr. Murphy a hug. In this way, the show suggests positive methods of dealing with problems. When this happens they usually perform the following: "hug a monkey...hug him tight...hug him till you feel alright". Poko does either that, or if Mr. Murphy isn't available, Poko releases his frustration by doing a dance called "The Poko Polka". He also has choices to release his frustration: either spending time alone on his swing, or shake his frustration out.

In the second season, a new segment was added called "Poko's Playhouse", in which Poko, Minus, and Bibi perform for a stuffed toy audience on a "Grand Ole Opry" type play-stage, with children performing a background song for each episode.

Similar to Toopy and Binoo, some episodes made appearances in more than one episode.

==== Season 1 (2003–2004) ====
No.	Title	Directed by	Written by	Original release date	American air date	Prod. code	US viewers (millions)
1	"Baby Murphy" Something Yummy for a Monkey Tummy"	Chuck Rubin	Jeff Rosen and Cheryl Wagner	June 9, 2003	January 6, 2004	101	N/A
1	"Poko's Pool"	Chuck Rubin	Jeff Rosen and Cheryl Wagner	June 9, 2003	January 6, 2004	101	N/A
2	"Poko and the Scary Shadow" Pirate Gold"	Chuck Rubin	Jeff Rosen and Cheryl Wagner	June 14, 2003	January 12, 2004	102	N/A
2	"Poko Kicks a Ball"	Chuck Rubin	Jeff Rosen and Cheryl Wagner	June 14, 2003	January 12, 2004	102	N/A
3	"Mr. Murphy in the Middle" A Super Monkey Loves to Play"	Chuck Rubin	Jeff Rosen and Cheryl Wagner	June 19, 2003	January 20, 2004	103	N/A
3	"Reaching Mr. Murphy"	Chuck Rubin	Jeff Rosen and Cheryl Wagner	June 19, 2003	January 20, 2004	103	N/A
4	"King Poko" "Super Monkey at the Supermarket"	Chuck Rubin	Jeff Rosen and Cheryl Wagner	June 25, 2003	January 26, 2004	104	N/A
4	"Poko's Swing"	Chuck Rubin	Jeff Rosen and Cheryl Wagner	June 25, 2003	January 26, 2004	104	N/A
5	"Poko Gets Bugged" Mighty Murph's Street Treats"	Chuck Rubin	Jeff Rosen and Cheryl Wagner	July 1, 2003	February 2, 2004	105	N/A
5	"Poko Makes a Hole"	Chuck Rubin	Jeff Rosen and Cheryl Wagner	July 1, 2003	February 2, 2004	105	N/A
6	"Poko-Motion" "Monkey Business at the Silly Circus"	Chuck Rubin	Jeff Rosen and Cheryl Wagner	July 7, 2003	February 9, 2004	106	N/A
6	"Poko's Scooter"	Chuck Rubin	Jeff Rosen and Cheryl Wagner	July 7, 2003	February 9, 2004	106	N/A
7	"Poko Has a Ball" "A Super Monkey Needs to See"	Chuck Rubin	Jeff Rosen and Cheryl Wagner	July 12, 2003	February 16, 2004	107	N/A
7	"Poko on the Slide"	Chuck Rubin	Jeff Rosen and Cheryl Wagner	July 12, 2003	February 16, 2004	107	N/A
8	"Poko's Little Sister" "A Super Monkey Loves to Drum"	Chuck Rubin	Jeff Rosen and Cheryl Wagner	July 17, 2003	February 23, 2004	108	N/A
8	"Poko's Pool"	Chuck Rubin	Jeff Rosen and Cheryl Wagner	July 17, 2003	February 23, 2004	108	N/A
9	"Baby Murphy" "A Super Monkey Loves to Touch"	Chuck Rubin	Jeff Rosen and Cheryl Wagner	July 23, 2003	March 1, 2004	109	N/A
9	"Poko's Lemonade Stand"	Chuck Rubin	Jeff Rosen and Cheryl Wagner	July 23, 2003	March 1, 2004	109	N/A
10	"Poko and the Bunny Slippers" "A Super Monkey Loves to Drum"	Chuck Rubin	Jeff Rosen and Cheryl Wagner	July 28, 2003	March 8, 2004	110	N/A
10	"Poko Kicks a Ball"	Chuck Rubin	Jeff Rosen and Cheryl Wagner	July 28, 2003	March 8, 2004	110	N/A
11	"Poko and the Scary Shadow" "Something Yummy at the Zoo"	Chuck Rubin	Jeff Rosen and Cheryl Wagner	August 3, 2003	March 15, 2004	111	N/A
11	"Poko's Laundry Day"	Chuck Rubin	Jeff Rosen and Cheryl Wagner	August 3, 2003	March 15, 2004	111	N/A
12	"Poko's New Toy" "A Super Monkey Loves to Fly"	Chuck Rubin	Jeff Rosen and Cheryl Wagner	August 8, 2003	March 22, 2004	112	N/A
12	"Reaching Mr. Murphy"	Chuck Rubin	Jeff Rosen and Cheryl Wagner	August 8, 2003	March 22, 2004	112	N/A
13	"Mr. Murphy in the Middle" "Something Yummy for a Monkey Tummy"	Chuck Rubin	Jeff Rosen and Cheryl Wagner	August 13, 2003	March 29, 2004	113	N/A
13	"Poko's Broken Toy"	Chuck Rubin	Jeff Rosen and Cheryl Wagner	August 13, 2003	March 29, 2004	113	N/A
14	"Poko Alone" "Something Yummy for a Monkey Tummy"	Chuck Rubin	Jeff Rosen and Cheryl Wagner	August 18, 2003	April 5, 2004	114	N/A
14	"Poko's Swing"	Chuck Rubin	Jeff Rosen and Cheryl Wagner	August 18, 2003	April 5, 2004	114	N/A
15	"King Poko" "Pirate Gold"	Chuck Rubin	Jeff Rosen and Cheryl Wagner	August 24, 2003	April 12, 2004	115	N/A
15	"Fireman Poko"	Chuck Rubin	Jeff Rosen and Cheryl Wagner	August 24, 2003	April 12, 2004	115	N/A
16	"Dr. Poko" "A Super Monkey Loves to Play"	Chuck Rubin	Jeff Rosen and Cheryl Wagner	August 29, 2003	April 18, 2004	116	N/A
16	"Poko Makes a Hole"	Chuck Rubin	Jeff Rosen and Cheryl Wagner	August 29, 2003	April 18, 2004	116	N/A
17	"Poko Gets Bugged" "Super Monkey at the Supermarket"	Chuck Rubin	Jeff Rosen and Cheryl Wagner	September 4, 2003	April 24, 2004	117	N/A
17	"Hide-'n'-Seek Poko"	Chuck Rubin	Jeff Rosen and Cheryl Wagner	September 4, 2003	April 24, 2004	117	N/A
18	"Poko's Circus" "Mighty Murph's Street Treats"	Chuck Rubin	Jeff Rosen and Cheryl Wagner	September 10, 2003	April 30, 2004	118	N/A
18	"Poko's Scooter"	Chuck Rubin	Jeff Rosen and Cheryl Wagner	September 10, 2003	April 30, 2004	118	N/A
19	"Poko-Motion" "Monkey Business at the Silly Circus"	Chuck Rubin	Jeff Rosen and Cheryl Wagner	September 16, 2003	May 7, 2004	119	N/A
19	"Poko's Sandcastle"	Chuck Rubin	Jeff Rosen and Cheryl Wagner	September 16, 2003	May 7, 2004	119	N/A
20	"Poko's Band" "A Super Monkey Needs to See"	Chuck Rubin	Jeff Rosen and Cheryl Wagner	September 21, 2003	May 13, 2004	120	N/A
20	"Poko on the Slide"	Chuck Rubin	Jeff Rosen and Cheryl Wagner	September 21, 2003	May 13, 2004	120	N/A

==== Season 2 (2005–2006) ====
No.	Title	Directed by	Written by	Original release date	American air date	Prod. code	US viewers (millions)
1	"Poko the Submarine Explorer"	Chuck Rubin	Jeff Rosen and Cheryl Wagner	September 5, 2005	TBA	201	N/A
1	"Poko, Bibi and the Dragon"	Chuck Rubin	Jeff Rosen and Cheryl Wagner	September 5, 2005	TBA	201	N/A
2	"Super Poko"	Chuck Rubin	Jeff Rosen and Cheryl Wagner	September 10, 2005	TBA	202	N/A
2	"Poko and Bibi's Bug Adventure"	Chuck Rubin	Jeff Rosen and Cheryl Wagner	September 10, 2005	TBA	202	N/A
3	"Poko and Bibi at the Fancy Restaurant"	Chuck Rubin	Jeff Rosen and Cheryl Wagner	September 13, 2005	TBA	203	N/A
3	"Poko the Pirate"	Chuck Rubin	Jeff Rosen and Cheryl Wagner	September 13, 2005	TBA	203	N/A
4	"Poko Plays School"	Chuck Rubin	Jeff Rosen and Cheryl Wagner	September 16, 2005	TBA	204	N/A
4	"Poko's Picnic"	Chuck Rubin	Jeff Rosen and Cheryl Wagner	September 16, 2005	TBA	204	N/A
5	"Poko and Bibi Play House"	Chuck Rubin	Jeff Rosen and Cheryl Wagner	September 20, 2005	TBA	205	N/A
5	"Poko and the Dinosaur"	Chuck Rubin	Jeff Rosen and Cheryl Wagner	September 20, 2005	TBA	205	N/A
6	"Poko's Shadow Show"	Chuck Rubin	Jeff Rosen and Cheryl Wagner	September 26, 2005	TBA	206	N/A
6	"Poko and Bibi Play Soccer"	Chuck Rubin	Jeff Rosen and Cheryl Wagner	September 26, 2005	TBA	206	N/A
7	"Bibi's Ballet Class"	Chuck Rubin	Jeff Rosen and Cheryl Wagner	September 30, 2005	TBA	207	N/A
7	"Poko's Ducky Day"	Chuck Rubin	Jeff Rosen and Cheryl Wagner	September 30, 2005	TBA	207	N/A
8	"Poko's Puppet Show"	Chuck Rubin	Jeff Rosen and Cheryl Wagner	October 4, 2005	TBA	208	N/A
8	"Poko's Lemonade Stand"	Chuck Rubin	Jeff Rosen and Cheryl Wagner	October 4, 2005	TBA	208	N/A
9	"Poko's Robot"	Chuck Rubin	Jeff Rosen and Cheryl Wagner	October 10, 2005	TBA	209	N/A
9	"Poko Plays Golf"	Chuck Rubin	Jeff Rosen and Cheryl Wagner	October 10, 2005	TBA	209	N/A
10	"Hocus Pocus Poko"	Chuck Rubin	Jeff Rosen and Cheryl Wagner	October 16, 2005	TBA	210	N/A
10	"Poko and Bibi's Playdate"	Chuck Rubin	Jeff Rosen and Cheryl Wagner	October 16, 2005	TBA	210	N/A
11	"Poko's Patients"	Chuck Rubin	Jeff Rosen and Cheryl Wagner	October 22, 2005	TBA	211	N/A
11	"Poko Goes Camping"	Chuck Rubin	Jeff Rosen and Cheryl Wagner	October 22, 2005	TBA	211	N/A
12	"Poko and Bibi's Dress-Up Day"	Chuck Rubin	Jeff Rosen and Cheryl Wagner	October 28, 2005	TBA	212	N/A
12	"Minus Has the Hiccups"	Chuck Rubin	Jeff Rosen and Cheryl Wagner	October 28, 2005	TBA	212	N/A
13	"Poko's Puzzle"	Chuck Rubin	Jeff Rosen and Cheryl Wagner	November 3, 2005	TBA	213	N/A
13	"Nutty's Nuts"	Chuck Rubin	Jeff Rosen and Cheryl Wagner	November 3, 2005	TBA	213	N/A
14	"Mr. Murphy's Birthday"	Chuck Rubin	Jeff Rosen and Cheryl Wagner	November 9, 2005	TBA	214	N/A
14	"Poko the Gymnast"	Chuck Rubin	Jeff Rosen and Cheryl Wagner	November 9, 2005	TBA	214	N/A
15	"Poko's Masks"	Chuck Rubin	Jeff Rosen and Cheryl Wagner	March 20, 2006	TBA	215	N/A
15	"Poko Plays Croquet"	Chuck Rubin	Jeff Rosen and Cheryl Wagner	March 20, 2006	TBA	215	N/A
16	"Poko and Bibi at the Toy Store"	Chuck Rubin	Jeff Rosen and Cheryl Wagner	March 26, 2006	TBA	216	N/A
16	"Jungle Jim"	Chuck Rubin	Jeff Rosen and Cheryl Wagner	March 26, 2006	TBA	216	N/A
17	"Bibi's Pop-Up Book"	Chuck Rubin	Jeff Rosen and Cheryl Wagner	April 2, 2006	TBA	217	N/A
17	"Poko’s Piñata"	Chuck Rubin	Jeff Rosen and Cheryl Wagner	April 2, 2006	TBA	217	N/A
18	"Poko and Bibi's Treasure Hunt"	Chuck Rubin	Jeff Rosen and Cheryl Wagner	April 8, 2006	TBA	218	N/A
18	"Poko and Minus Play Tag"	Chuck Rubin	Jeff Rosen and Cheryl Wagner	April 8, 2006	TBA	218	N/A
19	"Poko's Harmonica"	Chuck Rubin	Jeff Rosen and Cheryl Wagner	April 14, 2006	TBA	219	N/A
19	"Poko's New Friend"	Chuck Rubin	Jeff Rosen and Cheryl Wagner	April 14, 2006	TBA	219	N/A
20	"Minus the Babysitter"	Chuck Rubin	Jeff Rosen and Cheryl Wagner	April 20, 2006	TBA	220	N/A
20	"Poko's Monster Truck"	Chuck Rubin	Jeff Rosen and Cheryl Wagner	April 20, 2006	TBA	220	N/A
21	"Poko and Bibi Play Statue"	Chuck Rubin	Jeff Rosen and Cheryl Wagner	April 26, 2006	TBA	221	N/A
21	"Poko the Pilot"	Chuck Rubin	Jeff Rosen and Cheryl Wagner	April 26, 2006	TBA	221	N/A
22	"Poko's Pie"	Chuck Rubin	Jeff Rosen and Cheryl Wagner	May 1, 2006	TBA	222	N/A
22	"Poko and Bibi Play Fairies"	Chuck Rubin	Jeff Rosen and Cheryl Wagner	May 1, 2006	TBA	222	N/A
23	"Poko's Messy Room"	Chuck Rubin	Jeff Rosen and Cheryl Wagner	May 7, 2006	TBA	223	N/A
23	"Poko and Bibi of the Arctic"	Chuck Rubin	Jeff Rosen and Cheryl Wagner	May 7, 2006	TBA	223	N/A
24	"Poko's Flowers"	Chuck Rubin	Jeff Rosen and Cheryl Wagner	May 13, 2006	TBA	224	N/A
24	"Poko's Windy Day"	Chuck Rubin	Jeff Rosen and Cheryl Wagner	May 13, 2006	TBA	224	N/A
25	"Poko and Bibi's Petting Zoo"	Chuck Rubin	Jeff Rosen and Cheryl Wagner	May 19, 2006	TBA	225	N/A
25	"Poko's Balloon Ride"	Chuck Rubin	Jeff Rosen and Cheryl Wagner	May 19, 2006	TBA	225	N/A
26	"Poko and Bibi Play Musical Chairs"	Chuck Rubin	Jeff Rosen and Cheryl Wagner	May 25, 2006	TBA	226	N/A
26	"Minus Gets a Bath"	Chuck Rubin	Jeff Rosen and Cheryl Wagner	May 25, 2006	TBA	226	N/A

=== Play sequence ===
Two thirty-second shorts exist in each episode where Poko, Minus and Mr. Murphy play against a monocolor background. They may be swimming, surfing, riding an imaginary Roller coaster, or doing other activities or even dressing up like a ball.

=== Mighty Murph ===
In the middle of each show in season one, Poko reads a Mighty Murph story. Each one is made using Macromedia Flash, in cartoon style, and involves a baby Mr. Murphy in some dilemma, such as being hungry, or having nowhere to play. He then imagines he is Mighty Murph (a superhero who is a parody of Superman, as Mighty Murph can be seen doing a scene which is a reference to the Superman 1940s film series), and flies around to find a solution to his problem. His search is fruitless, and he realizes the best place is just where he is, as his own self with his mother. The stories are told by the narrator.

== Awards ==
- Gemini - Best Pre-School Program (2004)
- ACT Award - Grand Prize (2007)
- ACT Award - Animation Age 3-5 (2007)
