= Chewing on Glass & Other Miracle Cures =

Studio album by Sixtoo
- Released: May 17, 2004
- Studios: Mexican Vampire Studio, Montreal, Canada
- Genres: Hip hop; electronic
- Length: 56:05
- Label: Ninja Tune
- Producer: Sixtoo

Sixtoo chronology
| Almost a Dot on the Map: The Psyche Years 1996-2002 (2004) | Chewing on Glass & Other Miracle Cures (2004) | Jackals and Vipers in Envy of Man (2007) |

Singles from Chewing on Glass & Other Miracle Cures
- 1. "Boxcutter Emporium" Released: 2004

Chewing on Glass & Other Miracle Cures is a studio album by Canadian hip hop artist Sixtoo. It was released on Ninja Tune in 2004. It peaked at number 65 on the CMJ Top 200 chart. Damo Suzuki provided vocals on "Storm Clouds & Silver Linings".

== Critical reception ==
Professional ratings
Review scores
| Source | Rating |
|---|---|
| AllMusic | 3/5 stars |
| Cokemachineglow | 73/100 |
| Dusted Magazine | favorable |
| The Milk Factory | 4.2/5 |
| Pitchfork | 7.8/10 |
| Splendid Magazine | favorable |
| The Stranger | favorable |
| Stylus Magazine | C+ |
| Uncut | 4/5 stars |
| XLR8R | favorable |

John Bush of AllMusic gave the album 3 stars out of 5, saying, "Sixtoo's productions are dripping with atmosphere, and he possesses the fiending of a soundtracker for sounds that listeners haven't heard before but can immediately associate with a feeling -- and that feeling is usually a delicious sense of dread." Matthew Newton of XLR8R said: "Experimenting with acidic rock guitars and grimy basslines, Sixtoo reveals a new stylistic approach while retaining his signature murky sound."

David Moore of Pitchfork gave the album a 7.8 out of 10, saying: "Where so many electronic artists demonstrate their 'legitimate' acoustic abilities with the insistence of a neglected studio musician, Sixtoo's development as live musician and composer comes across as natural and well-suited to his talents." He called it "an admirably genuine fusion of acoustic composition with the sensibilities of electronic music."

Exclaim! named it the 2nd best electronic album of 2004.

== Track listing ==
| No. | Title | Length |
|---|---|---|
| 1. | "Boxcutter Emporium Part 1" | 2:16 |
| 2. | "Chewing on Glass" | 1:20 |
| 3. | "Sidewinders" | 2:01 |
| 4. | "Karmic Retribution" | 1:13 |
| 5. | "Funny Sticks Reprise" | 2:13 |
| 6. | "Boxcutter Emporium Part 2" | 4:50 |
| 7. | "Boxcutter Emporium Part 3" | 2:57 |
| 8. | "Old Days Architecture" | 4:24 |
| 9. | "Chainsaw Buffet" | 1:17 |
| 10. | "Snake Bite" | 5:04 |
| 11. | "Transient Control" | 1:55 |
| 12. | "Chainsaw Breakfast" | 0:38 |
| 13. | "Horse Drawn Carriage" | 5:27 |
| 14. | "Chainsaw Juggler" | 0:29 |
| 15. | "The Honesty of Constant Human Error" | 4:33 |
| 16. | "Storm Clouds & Silver Linings" (featuring Damo Suzuki) | 8:52 |
| 17. | "Closing Day Sale" | 6:26 |
| Total length: | | 56:05 |

== Personnel ==
Credits adapted from liner notes.

- Sixtoo – production, recording
- Damo Suzuki – vocals (16)
