= Of Cities =

Studio album by DJ Signify
- Released: January 20, 2009
- Genre: Hip hop
- Length: 47:24
- Label: Bully Records
- Producer: DJ Signify; Blockhead

DJ Signify chronology
Sleep No More (2004)	Of Cities (2009)

Of Cities is the second studio album by American hip hop producer DJ Signify. It was released on Bully Records on January 20, 2009. It features guest appearances from Aesop Rock and Matt Kelly.

== Critical reception ==
Professional ratings
Review scores
Source	Rating
Cyclic Defrost	favorable
Electronic Musician	3.5/5
HipHopDX	3.5/5
PopMatters	8/10 stars
RapReviews.com	8/10
The Stranger	favorable
Tiny Mix Tapes	4/5 stars
XLR8R	7/10

Dave Segal of The Stranger gave the album a favorable review, stating, "Signify gives us 16 tracks—including six brief interludes ripe for bumper usage in NPR's hipper segments—on Of Cities that bring the funk, but stoically, with urban grime and urbane grimness." Jennifer Marston of XLR8R said: "He's still pushing his drum-heavy style, which is tight as ever, but he's also reeled in shades of glitch, new wave, Kraut-rock, and other genres for the tracks."

PopMatters named it the 3rd best instrumental hip hop album of 2009.

== Track listing ==
No.	Title	Length
1.	"The Sickness"	5:17
2.	"Low Tide" (featuring Aesop Rock)	4:21
3.	"Interlude 1"	0:52
4.	"Costume Kids"	4:41
5.	"Delight to the Sadist" (featuring Matt Kelly)	3:21
6.	"Interlude 2"	1:18
7.	"Vanessa"	5:00
8.	"Interlude 3"	0:36
9.	"1993"	3:31
10.	"Interlude 4"	0:55
11.	"Sink or Swim" (featuring Aesop Rock)	3:44
12.	"The Gods Get Dirty"	4:27
13.	"Interlude 5"	1:19
14.	"Bollywood Babies"	4:08
15.	"Interlude 6"	0:30
16.	"Hold Me Don't Touch Me"	3:24
Total length:		47:24

== Personnel ==
Credits adapted from liner notes.

- DJ Signify – turntables, production, arrangement, mixing
- Aesop Rock – vocals (2, 11), lyrics (2, 11)
- Matt Kelly – additional arrangement (2, 7, 16), guitar (5), keyboards (5)
- Blockhead – co-production (4, 9)
- Joe Beats – engineering
- Harris Newman – mastering
- Paul "Quo" Kwiakowski – artwork, layout
- Todd Lown – photography
- Chris Bryant – photography
