= Still Alive at the Veglia Lounge =

EP by Stigg of the Dump
- Released: April 9, 2002
- Genre: Underground hip hop
- Length: 21:15
- Label: Endemik Music
- Producer: Stigg of the Dump

Professional ratings
Review scores
Source	Rating
Exclaim!	favorable
UKHH.com	favorable

Still Alive at the Veglia Lounge is the debut EP from Canadian underground hip hop producer Stigg of the Dump. It was released on Endemik Music in 2002.

== Reception ==
Tiny Mix Tapes praised the EP as "an overlooked album with a flash of greatness that wasn’t fully appreciated."

== Track listing ==
No.	Title	Length
1.	"Five Dollar Jesus" (featuring Buck 65)	5:00
2.	"Garbage Rain" (featuring Sixtoo)	4:30
3.	"Pointing Fingers" (featuring Sebutones)	3:15
4.	"Pointing Fingers Instrumental"	3:15
5.	"Short Strings" (featuring Sixtoo)	5:17
