= DJ Signify =

American underground hip-hop producer

- Origin: Brooklyn, New York, United States
- Genres: Instrumental hip hop
- Occupations: Producer, DJ
- Instruments: Sampler, turntable
- Years active: 1996-present
- Labels: Lex Records, Bully Records, Grandgood, Four Ways To Rock, Cease & Desist
- Website: www.myspace.com/djsignify

DJ Signify is an American underground hip hop producer.

== History ==
DJ Signify's first album Sleep No More, featuring collaborations with Sage Francis and Buck 65, was described as "hip-hop at its darkest and most chilling" and earned him accolades as a "master beatsmith." His second album Of Cities was similarly described as "dense, bleak instrumental hip-hop," reminiscent of Burial's Untrue and Tricky's Maxinquaye.

== Discography ==
=== Albums ===
- Sleep No More (Lex Records, 2004)
- Of Cities (Bully Records, 2009)

=== Singles ===
- Untitled (2003) with Grandmaster Caz
- Winter’s Going (2004)
- Unclean Vol. 1 (2004)
- No One Leaves (2005) with Six Vicious
- Nobody's Smiling (2007) with Blockhead

=== Mixtapes ===
- Signifyin’ Breaks (1996)
- Mixed Messages (2000)
- Teach The Children Vol. 1 (2004)

=== Contributions ===
- Buck 65 - Square (2002)
- Clouddead - "And All You Can Do Is Laugh (2)" from Clouddead (2001)
- Sage Francis - "The Strange Famous Mullet Remover" "Smoke and Mirrors" from Personal Journals (2002)
- Sage Francis - "Kiddie Litter" from Sickly Business (2004)
- Blockhead - "Coloring Book" "Duke of Hazzard" "Put Down Your Dream Journal and Dance" "Trailer Love" from Uncle Tony's Coloring Book (2007)
- Isaiah Toothtaker - "Jumping Off" "Signifying" "R.I.P. Zeek" "What's Really Good?" from Murs 3:16 Presents (2008)
- Blockhead - "It's Raining Clouds" "Hell Camp" "Farewell Spaceman" from The Music Scene (2009)

=== Compilation appearances ===
- "Propaganda" "Meditations" "Interlude" with DJ Mayonnaise on Music for the Advancement of Hip Hop (1999)
- "I Dream (Tranquility)" with Lulu Mushi on Ropeladder 12 (2000)
- "Buk Out" "Motion Study" on Lunch Money Singles (2004)
