= The Diary of the Madmen =

2005 album by Len

Studio album by Len
- Released: April 19, 2005
- Recorded: January 2001 – June 2004
- Genres: Alternative rock, rap rock
- Length: 51:22
- Label: Venus

Len chronology
You Can't Stop the Bum Rush (1999)	The Diary of the Madmen (2005)	It's Easy If You Try (2012)

Singles from The Diary of the Madmen
- 1. "It's a Brother Sister Thing" Released: 2003

Professional ratings
Review scores
Source	Rating
AllMusic	3.5/5 stars

The Diary of the Madmen is the fourth studio album by alternative rock band Len, released in 2005. A promotional version of the album was released in 2002 under the title We Be Who We Be.

== Track listing ==
No.	Title	Writer(s)	Length
1.	"Intro"	Denero	0:30
2.	"We Are..."	Marc Costanzo, P. Hancock, M. McMahon	1:35
3.	"People (Come Together)"	Marc Costanzo, Sharon Costanzo, Divine Styler, Brian Higgins, Michael Parnin, Planet Pea, M. Wilson*	3:05
4.	"We Be Who We Be"	Marc Costanzo, Sharon Costanzo, Divine Styler, M. McKay, Planet Pea, M. Wilson*	3:14
5.	"Good Ol' Days"	Marc Costanzo, M. McMahon, R. Morris, Timur Musabay	3:00
6.	"It's a Brother Sister Thing"	Marc Costanzo, Sharon Costanzo, Michael Parnin	2:44
7.	"Cool It Now" (New Edition cover)	Vincent Brantley, Rick Timas	4:27
8.	"Get Down"	Marc Costanzo, Divine Styler*	3:57
9.	"Another Crazy Nite"	Marc Costanzo, R. Morris	1:48
10.	"Fight"	Marc Costanzo, Sharon Costanzo	3:18
11.	"Kookoo Docks"	Governor Bolts, DJ Moves	3:22
12.	"Funnel"	Marc Costanzo, P. Hancock, M. McMahon, Timur Musabay, J. Schroeder	3:48
13.	"The Royal Screwjob"	Marc Costanzo	2:59
14.	"Let It Slide" (featuring Biz Markie)	Marc Costanzo, Sharon Costanzo	3:55
15.	"Better Days"	Marc Costanzo, Nick Gefucia	3:02
16.	"Dante's Inferno"	Brian Higgins	3:22
17.	"Outro"	Denero	0:32
18.	"Video Killed the Radio Star" (hidden track)	Geoff Downes, Trevor Horn, Bruce Woolley	2:44

Bonus tracks
No.	Title	Length
19.	"Red Hot Day"	2:08
20.	"Rubble"	3:08

== Samples ==
"People (Come Together)"

- "Reach Out of the Darkness" by Friend & Lover
- "Electric Relaxation" by A Tribe Called Quest

"We Be Who We Be"

- "The International Zone Coaster" by Leaders of the New School
- "Doowutchyalike" by Digital Underground

"Get Down"

- "Spirit of the Boogie" by Kool & the Gang

== We Be Who We Be ==
We Be Who We Be

Studio album by Len
- Released: 2002
- Recorded: 2001–2002
- Genres: Alternative rock, hip hop
- Labels: DreamWorks (promotional release), Linus

Len chronology
You Can't Stop the Bum Rush (1999)	We Be Who We Be (2002)	The Diary of the Madmen (2005)

Singles from We Be Who We Be
- 1. "Bobby" Released: 2002

We Be Who We Be is the fourth studio album by the Canadian alternative rock band Len, released by Linus Entertainment and DreamWorks in 2002. The album was reissued with additional and altered tracks by Venus Corp. in 2005 as The Diary of the Madmen.

No.	Title	Writer(s)	Length
1.	"We Are..."	Marc Costanzo, P. Hancock, M. McMahon	1:35
2.	"People (Come Together)"	Marc Costanzo, Sharon Costanzo, Divine Styler, Brian Higgins, Michael Parnin, Planet Pea, M. Wilson*	3:10
3.	"Bobby" (featuring Whitey Don)		3:22
4.	"We Be Who We Be"	Marc Costanzo, Sharon Costanzo, Divine Styler, M. McKay, Planet Pea, M. Wilson*	3:17
5.	"Get Down"	Marc Costanzo, Divine Styler*	3:55
6.	"We Rock the Mic"		3:18
7.	"King of the Block"		3:57
8.	"Boozehounds"		2:46
9.	"Kookoo Docks"	Governor Bolts, DJ Moves	4:05
10.	"Saturday"		3:27
11.	"Funnel"	Marc Costanzo, P. Hancock, M. McMahon, Timur Musabay, J. Schroeder	2:55
12.	"Cool It Now" (New Edition cover)	Vincent Brantley, Rick Timas	4:23
13.	"Let It Slide" (featuring Biz Markie)	Marc Costanzo, Sharon Costanzo	3:55
14.	"Dante's Inferno"	Brian Higgins	3:22

=== Samples ===
"Saturday"

- "Gimme the Finga" by Black Sheep
