= Len (band) =

Canadian alternative rock band

- Origin: Toronto, Ontario, Canada
- Genres: Alternative rock; indie rock; pop; rap rock; trip-hop
- Years active: 1991–2005; 2011–present
- Labels: EMI; Epic; Work; Columbia; DreamWorks
- Members: Marc Costanzo; Sharon Costanzo
- Past members: Brendan Canning; Brian "DJ Moves" Higgins; Philip "Planet Pea" Rae; Derek "D Rock" MacKenzie; Drew "You're You" Lidkea; Drew MacEachern; Jody Mayne; Roy Thirlwall; Mike Ramsay; Brian Palmer; Craig Bennett; Matt Kelly; Malcolm Sweeney

Len is a Canadian alternative rock duo based in Toronto, Ontario. The band consists of siblings Marc Costanzo (vocals, guitar) and Sharon Costanzo (vocals, bass) and a revolving lineup of touring and studio musicians. The group is best known for their 1999 single "Steal My Sunshine".

== History ==
Marc Costanzo began recreationally recording music at the age of 13 years old. These recordings were predominantly helmed by Marc, although his older sister Sharon sometimes contributed vocals to the recordings. In 1991, Marc began to produce music under the pseudonym of Len as a solo project. The name was taken from a high school friend of Marc's named Lenny. Sharon officially joined this project a year later, thus marking Len's first iteration as a duo. Len began as a punk rock band, with pop music influences. Between 1992 and 1997, the brother-sister duo independently released a self-titled extended play and two studio albums, Superstar (1995) and Get Your Legs Broke (1997).

In 1994, "Candy Pop" was recorded and used as the theme song for the newest season of CBC's Streetcents. In March 1994, the band released a split-cassette release on No Records, which also featured Hip Club Groove, Zoltar, and Chaz Rules.

As Superstar was recorded when the band were in Halifax, the band shot some music videos for the songs "Candy Pop", "Show Off", and "Slacker", and the album featured many alumni of the Halifax music scene, such as Joel Plaskett, Michael Catano, and Chris Murphy. The band performed at the 1995 Halifax Pop Explosion, for a No Cases No Records showcase, of which they were signed to, at the time.

Marc estimated both Superstar & Get Your Legs Broke sold around 10-15,000 units each. While these two albums received minimal attention in Canada, the duo found difficulty in attracting attention from major record labels. The band had their first taste of success when they received retroactive acclaim for the song "Candy Pop".

In 1998, Len signed with the American label Work Group. In 1999, Len released a more hip-hop oriented album, You Can't Stop the Bum Rush. A song from the album, "Steal My Sunshine", featuring a sample of the disco track "More, More, More" by the Andrea True Connection, was released as a single. It peaked at number three on the RPM Top Singles chart and also peaked within the top ten in various other countries, including Australia, the United Kingdom and the United States, and became Len's biggest hit. Len was nominated for a 2000 Juno Award as best new group, and the album was nominated as Best Alternative Album.

After the song, Len's fame dropped, but they continued to release albums until 2005, followed by a seven-year hiatus. During this hiatus, Marc announced the group's disbandment in a MySpace message dated 2008. He stated: "...it looks like we're not gonna make another len record. Just couldn't get it (and everyone) together." He still, however, announced he and Sharon would still record another album together. Despite this, Len returned with Marc and Sharon in October 2012, in which they released their fifth studio album It's Easy If You Try. The album was promoted with one single, "It's My Neighborhood", which had a music video featuring scenes of Toronto residents lip syncing to the song.

In 2016, Marc announced it is unlikely they will record another album.

== Discography ==
=== Studio albums ===
List of studio albums, with selected chart positions, sales figures and certifications
Title	Album details	Peak chart positions			Certifications
Title	Album details	US	CAN	UK	Certifications
Superstar	Released: 1995; Label: Funtrip, No; Formats: CD, cassette	—	—	—	
Get Your Legs Broke	Released: 1997; Label: Funtrip; Formats: CD	—	—	—	
You Can't Stop the Bum Rush	Released: May 25, 1999; Label: Work; Formats: CD, cassette, LP	46	32	177	RIAA: Gold; MC: Gold
The Diary of the Madmen	Released: April 19, 2005; Label: Venus; Formats: CD, digital download	—	—	—	
It's Easy If You Try	Released: October 16, 2012; Label: EMI; Formats: CD, digital download	—	—	—	
"—" denotes a recording that did not chart or was not released in that territory.

=== Extended plays ===
Title	Details
Len	Released: 1992; Label: Funtrip; Format: Cassette

=== Singles ===
Year	Single	Peak chart positions				Certification	Album
Year	Single	CAN	AUS	UK	US	Certification	Album
1994	"Slacker"	—	—	—	—		Superstar
1995	"Candy Pop"	—	—	—	—		Superstar
1995	"Showoff"	—	—	—	—		Superstar
1996	"Smarty Pants"	—	—	—	—		Get Your Legs Broke
1997	"She's Not"	—	—	—	—		Get Your Legs Broke
1997	"Trillion Daze"	—	—	—	—		Get Your Legs Broke
1999	"Steal My Sunshine"	3	3	8	9	ARIA: Platinum; BPI: Platinum; RIAA: Platinum	You Can't Stop the Bum Rush
1999	"Feelin' Alright"	—	—	—	—		You Can't Stop the Bum Rush
2000	"Cryptik Souls Crew"	52	—	28	—		You Can't Stop the Bum Rush
2000	"Kids in America"	—	—	—	—		Digimon: The Movie
2002	"Bobby"	—	—	—	—		We Be Who We Be
2003	"It's a Brother Sister Thing"	—	—	—	—		The Diary of the Madmen
2012	"It's My Neighbourhood"	—	—	—	—		It's Easy If You Try

=== Guest appearances ===
List of non-single guest appearances, showing year released and album name
Title	Year	Other artist(s)	Album
"Cool Beans"	1994	Hip Club Groove, Sixtoo	Cool Beans EP
"The Elephant Song"	1994	None	Big Truck Records Presents: Road Kill
"Making Our Dreams Come True"	1996	None	More of Our Stupid Noise
"Big Meany"	2010	Hip Club Groove, Stinkin' Rich	Unreleased & Rare

== Awards ==
Ceremony	Year	Award	Song
MuchMusic Video Awards	1999	Best Video	"Steal My Sunshine"
MuchMusic Video Awards	1999	Best Pop Video	"Steal My Sunshine"
MuchMusic Video Awards	1999	Favourite Canadian Video	"Steal My Sunshine"
