= Get Your Legs Broke =

Studio album by Len
- Released: 1997
- Genre: Alternative rock, indie rock
- Length: 45:48
- Label: Funtrip
- Producer: Mumble C

Len chronology
Superstar (1995)	Get Your Legs Broke (1997)	You Can't Stop the Bum Rush (1999)

Singles from Get Your Legs Broke
- 1. "Smarty Pants" Released: 1996; 2. "She's Not" Released: 1997; 3. "Trillion Daze" Released: 1997

Get Your Legs Broke is the second album by Canadian alternative rock band Len, released in 1997. Music Videos were shot for the songs "Smarty Pants" and "Trillion Daze"

== Track listing ==
No.	Title	Length
1.	"Intro"	0:28
2.	"Funny"	4:14
3.	"Smarty Pants"	4:08
4.	"Trip to the Moon"	2:49
5.	"Saturday Morning"	3:28
6.	"Granny Love"	2:20
7.	"Grand Theft Snowboard"	2:35
8.	"Trillion Daze"	1:55
9.	"Get Your Legs Broke"	2:50
10.	"She's Not"	3:35
11.	"Chocho Loco"	2:09
12.	"Bocci Balls"	2:58
13.	"Drunken Style"	12:19
