= No Records =

Canadian record label

No Records (later No Records & Distribution)
- Founded: 1993
- Founder: Waye Mason
- Defunct: 2004
- Distributors: Ozone Records (1996), Page Music (1997–99), No Distribution (1999–2004)
- Genre: Alternative rock Hip Hop; Indie rock Punk rock
- Country of origin: Canada
- Location: Halifax, Nova Scotia
- Official website: www.norecords.com (defunct)

No Records was a Canadian record label and distributor based in Halifax, Nova Scotia from January 1993 to August 2004. It was founded by Waye Mason.

Started during the "Halifax is the Seattle of the north" phenomenon of the 1990s, No Records released cassettes by Chaz Rules, Halifax hip-hop pioneers Hip Club Groove, Essen (featuring Mike Catano on drums, who later formed North of America), punk stalwarts Donner Party Reunion, and Stinkin' Rich, who later performed as Buck 65.

In 1996, the label started releasing CDs, the first of which were by power pop band the Grace Babies and the internationally successful Cool Blue Halo. The late '90s and early 21st century saw the label release several critically well received CDs, cassettes and 8 tracks by artists such as the briefly famous Toronto group Len, Strawberry, Vancouver's Readymade and Dusty Sorbet.

The company created a sister imprint, Cease and Desist in 2000 to release some albums orphaned by the collapse of Marc Costanzo of Len's Four Ways to Rock record label. Albums by DJ Mr Dibbs, DJ Signify, and later rapper and producer Sixtoo were added to the label.

Unable to obtain high quality retail distribution, the company created No Distribution Limited to distribute both their own and other labels records across Canada and internationally in 1997. This ambitious plan included developing the first online record store for independent music in Canada and at one point included a storefront shop in Halifax. In 2004 the store closed and the company went out of business.

== See also ==
- List of record labels
