= Hydra (band) =

American southern rock band

Hydra is an American Southern rock band founded in 1970 by Spencer Kirkpatrick (guitar), Wayne Bruce (vocals and guitar), Steve Pace (drums) and Orville Davis (bass). In 1977, it became a three-piece band (with Wayne Bruce now on bass) and the band broke up later that year. It released three albums, Hydra (1974), Land of Money (1975) and Rock the World (1977). In 2005, the band reunited for two shows (with Vickery on bass). A live album, Hydra: Live After All These Years was released.

== Career ==
Pace and Kirkpatrick first played together in 1968 in the band Strange Brew. Wayne Bruce was playing with the band Nickelodian and accepted the offer to join Pace and Kirkpatrick in the short-lived Noah Mayflower. These three remained together in the band Osmosis until 1969 when, after enlisting a succession of bassists, Hydra finally emerged with the inclusion of Trip Burgess in 1970, and later Orville Davis in 1971. Davis remained with Hydra on their first two LP's, before leaving the group to join the hard rock outfit Rex, and then briefly Starz. Hydra's reputation as a solid live act in the Atlanta, Georgia area began to spread and the band expanded their territory. They began supporting major internationally known acts in concert. They have been referred to as the first heavy southern rock band.

The band signed a recording contract with Capricorn Records in 1973 and released a self-titled album Hydra in 1974. In 1975, Land of Money followed. The producer, Dan Turbeville, used a horn section (without the band's knowledge) on the first album and musicians like Chuck Leavell (Allman Brothers band, The Rolling Stones, and Eric Clapton) on piano and keyboards, and Randall Bramblett, who later founded his own Randall Bramblett Band, on the second.

In 1977, as a three-piece band (with Wayne Bruce now on bass), Hydra released Rock the World. Some reviewers, including Edgar Brimer, their road manager, consider this to be their best record. By the end of 1977, the band broke up and reformed only occasionally thereafter, except for a series of shows in 1997, first with Jimmy Cobb and later with Tommy Vickery on bass, replacing Davis.

== Post break-up and reformation ==
Spencer Kirkpatrick later performed on albums by blues guitarist Wayne 'Bear' Sauls and on records by Eddie Stone, and Donnie McCormick. He also contributed to "Georgia Jam" from Stevie Hawkins. Steve Pace went on to work with Whitford St. Holmes (Brad Whitford from Aerosmith and Derek St. Holmes from Ted Nugent band) and the band Krokus. Wayne Bruce formed his own band (The Wayne Bruce Band) and Orville Davis launched a solo career as a country music singer.

Hydra's two Capricorn LPs were briefly reissued on CD in the late 1990s in limited editions (which have become collector's items,) while Rock the World, though remastered for CD, has not been reissued as of April 2011. According to Wayne Bruce, the Rock the World CD reissue remains in limbo due to licensing problems with the now defunct USA branch of Polydor. In 2005, the band reunited for two shows (with Vickery on bass), resulting in the release of their fourth album, Hydra: Live After All These Years. On June 20, 2005, Hydra appeared on XM Radio's Deep Tracks station, which played several of their songs and included an interview with the band.

Hydra kept going and has records up to 2024.

== Discography ==
=== Albums ===
- 1974: Hydra
- 1975: Land of Money
- 1977: Rock the World
- 2005: Hydra: Live After All These Years
