= Sixtoo =

Canadian DJ, producer, and rapper

- Also known as: Prison Garde, Six Vicious, Speakerbruiser Rob
- Born: Vaughn Robert Squire
- Origin: Halifax, Nova Scotia, Canada
- Genres: Alternative hip hop, electronic
- Occupations: DJ, producer, rapper
- Instruments: Drum machine, sampler
- Years active: 1990–present
- Labels: Ninja Tune, Bully Records, Anticon, 6months, Vertical Form, Ant Records, Metaforensics, Cease & Desist
- Formerly of: Megasoid; Nouveau Palais; Sebutones; Villain Accelerate

Sixtoo was the main project of Canadian underground hip hop DJ, producer and rapper Vaughn Robert Squire between 1996 and 2007. He began pursuing other directions in electronic music, with a large genre shift from experimental hip hop to deeper club sounds of various tempos. He has also released music as Speakerbruiser Rob, and Prison Garde.

== History ==
Sixtoo rose to prominence in the mid-1990s underground hip hop scene, initially as half of Halifax, Nova Scotia hip hop duo Sebutones, along with Buck 65. During that time, he worked with Sage Francis, Mr. Dibbs and other members of Anticon. In 1997, he released a split EP with Moka Only titled The Crystal Senate.

In 2000, Sixtoo moved to Montreal where he signed on with UK-based record label Vertical Form. Soon after came the release of Antagonist Survival Kit, a synth-based sample album that showcased both sides of his skills: on the mic and on the sampler.

In 2003, Sixtoo signed to Ninja Tune. His debut album on the label, Chewing on Glass & Other Miracle Cures, won acclaim in the international electronic beats community in 2004.

Since silencing the Sixtoo project, he has had a string of visible live P.A. projects including Megasoid along with Hadji Bakara, a former member of Wolf Parade. He has also collaborated with Ango and Lunice on the electronic music project Nouveau Palais. The trio released Avant Gang in 2012.

Sixtoo entirely produced Isaiah Toothtaker's Sea Punk Funk in 2012.

== Discography ==
=== Albums ===
- Superstar Props (1994)
- Four Elements (1995)
- Return of the Seeker (1996)
- Progress (1997)
- The Psyche Intangible (1998)
- The Psyche Continuum (1999)
- Songs I Hate (and Other People Moments) (2001)
- Duration (2001)
- Antagonist Survival Kit (2001)
- Antagonist Survival Kit Instrumentals (2001)
- Almost a Dot on the Map: The Psyche Years 1996-2002 (2004)
- Chewing on Glass & Other Miracle Cures (2004)
- Jackals and Vipers in Envy of Man (2007)
- Système Hermès Volume One (2011) (as Prison Garde)
- Occultsystem (2014) (as Prison Garde)

=== Mixtapes ===
- Boogie Screw (2012) (as Prison Garde)

=== EPs ===
- Termination Dubs (2000)
- Body Ache Summer (2004)
- Boxcutter Emporium (2004)
- It's the Mindfuck Yo! Sit Your Ass Down (2006)
- Forts (2014) (as Prison Garde)
- October (2015) (as Prison Garde)

=== Singles ===
- "A Work in Progress" (2001)
- "The Secrets That Houses Keep" (2001)
- "Outremont Mainline Runs Across the Sunset" (2001)
- "Krunk's Not Dead" (2005) (as Six Vicious)
- "Two Strikes" (2005)
- "Next" (2006)
- "Fight" (2006)

=== Collaborations ===
Albums

- Sebutones - 50/50 Where It Counts (1998)
- Villain Accelerate - Maid of Gold (2003)

Mixtapes

- Megasoid - Tank Thong Re-Mixtape (2008)
- Megasoid - Remix Runners Re-Mixtape (2009)

EPs

- Sebutones - Psoriasis (1996)
- Sixtoo / Moka Only - Crystal Senate (1997)
- Garde & Eames - Bricks (2011)
- Nouveau Palais - Avant Gang (2012)

Singles

- Hip Club Groove - "Cool Beans" (1993)
- Sebutones - "Sebutone Def" (1997)
- Sixtoo & Matth - "He Did Glass Music" (2003)
- Sixtoo vs. Simahlak - "All Star Battle" (2003)
- DJ Signify and Six Vicious - "No One Leaves" (2005)
- Sixtoo & Norsola - "Homages" (2005)

=== Guest appearances ===
- The Goods - "Saga" from Dream Sequence (1999)
- Sole - "Nothing Fell Apart" from Bottle of Humans (2000)
- Shape Shifters - "Man 2 Ape 2 Fish" from Know Future (2000)
- Alias - "Awaken" from "Final Act" (2001)
- Aquasky - "The Shamen" from The Shamen (2001)
- Stigg of the Dump - "Garbage Rain", "Pointing Fingers", and "Short Strings" from Still Alive at the Veglia Lounge (2002)
- Hip Club Groove - "Cool Beans", "Big Bad Stylee '91", and "Fluctuating Mental States" from Unreleased & Rare (2010)

=== Productions ===
- Hip Club Groove - "Pornostar" from Land of the Lost (1996)
- Sole - "Nothing Fell Apart" from Bottle of Humans (2000)
- Kunga 219 - "Fine Spirits" and "Lonesome Cowboy: Part 2 ('98 Revisited)" from Tharpa's Transcripts... A Time and a Place (2000)
- Anticon - "Pitty Party People" from We Ain't Fessin' (Double Quotes) (2002)
- Sage Francis - "Crack Pipes", "Different", "Buckets of Silence", "Black Sweatshirt", and "Cup of Tea" from Personal Journals (2002)
- Knowself & Moves - "Reality of Birth" and "Meaning?" from Pseudo Freedom in the Age of Manipulation (2004)
- Recyclone - "The Dead World" from Corroding the Dead World (2005)
- Sage Francis - "Crumble" and "Ground Control" from A Healthy Distrust (2005)
- Moka Only - "More Soup" from The Desired Effect (2005)
- Sage Francis - "Broccilude" from Human the Death Dance (2007)
- Isaiah Toothtaker - "Biters Eat a Dick", "Cypher & Sphere", "Free Gear", and "Ready to Die" from Murs 3:16 Presents (2008)
- Isaiah Toothtaker - "Hard as Hell", "Werewolfing", and "Bass Face" from Yiggy (2010)
- Isaiah Toothtaker - Sea Punk Funk (2012)

=== Remixes ===
- DJ Vadim - "Edie Brickell (Sixtoo Remix)" (2003)
- Smyglssana - "Foaming Prairie (Sixtoo Remix)" from We Can Fix It Remixes (2003)
- Lali Puna - "Small Things (Sixtoo Remix)" from I Thought I Was Over That (2005)
- Amon Tobin - "Kitchen Sink (Sixtoo Remix)" from Kitchen Sink Remixes (2007)
- Ghislain Poirier - "No More Blood (Megasoid Remix)" from No Ground Under (2007)
- Thunderheist - "Jerk It (Megasoid Remix)" (2008)
- Hovatron - "Gypsy Trader (Prison Garde Remix)" (2011)
- Monolithium - "Simon & G-Funk (Prison Garde Remix)" (2011)
- Gunplay & Isaiah Toothtaker - "Frownin (Sixtoo Remix)" (2013)

=== Compilation appearances ===
- "Simulated Snow" "Holy Shit!" on Music for the Advancement of Hip Hop (1999)
- "Grimey Inks the Moment" on Giga Single (2001)
