= Baby Dayliner =

American singer

Ethan Marunas, better known by his stage name Baby Dayliner, is an American singer-songwriter, producer, and DJ from New York City. He was born and raised in New York City, and went to Fiorello H. LaGuardia High School of Music & Art and Performing Arts, also known as the high school from the 1980 film Fame. He attended St. John's College in Annapolis, MD and Santa Fe, NM. After varying roles in different bands, Marunas decided to take the stage as a solo act. He became deft at synths, samplers, and recording, and began crafting songs that would be performed under the Baby Dayliner name.

Marunas' first big musical influence was classical as a child violinist. Later came jazz and hip-hop records. His first pop music love was Hall and Oates, which he listened to alongside Kabuki theater music and other sounds.

Baby Dayliner has released two albums and three EPs on Brassland Records. He was signed to the label as The National's favorite live performer in New York City. Marunas has opened for a variety of musical acts including Scissor Sisters, The National, and Trans Am.

According to Uncut magazine, Baby Dayliner is "a retro romo romp through a New York ghost world that is neither the drainpipe-and-denim sweat pile of CBGBs nor the mirrorball glitz of Studio 54 but somewhere in between."

Marunas is the younger half brother of actor Kevin Bacon, and a distant relative of actor Sir John Gielgud.

== Discography ==
ALBUMS

High Heart and Low Estate -- (2006) Brassland

1. Raid!
2. Hoodlums In The Hit Parade
3. Party Scenes
4. Madeline
5. Beat Downs
6. High Heart & Low Estate
7. Can't Believe
8. Lullabies
9. Dead Ladies
10. I'll Be Your Counterpart
11. Funeral Dirge

Critics Pass Away -- (2006) Brassland

1. At Least
2. Critics Pass Away
3. House And Confusion
4. The Way You Look Tonight
5. Through These Hills
6. Whodunit?
7. Go On Baby
8. Breezy
9. Small Town Halls
10. Silent Places
11. Simon Sez
12. Nature's Clause
13. Drop Dead Gorgeous

EPs

You Push I'll Go -- (2017) Brassland

Key Largo -- (2018) Brassland

You Should Be Dancin -- (2019) Brassland

== Sources ==
- http://brassland.org
- https://web.archive.org/web/20070927004217/http://www.insound.com/label/labels.php?id=brasslan&x=13&y=13
