= Definitive Jux discography =

The following is an incomplete discography for Definitive Jux, an independent hip hop record label based in New York City, United States. Artists such as El-P, Aesop Rock, Cannibal Ox, Mr. Lif, RJD2, and Cage have released records through Definitive Jux.

== Albums ==
- 2000: Mr. Lif – Enters the Colossus EP
- 2001: Various Artists – Def Jux Presents EP
- 2001: Cannibal Ox – The Cold Vein
- 2001: Aesop Rock – Labor Days
- ~`~`: Various Artists – Farewell Fondle 'Em
- 2002: Aesop Rock – Daylight EP
- ~`~`: Various Artists – Def Jux Presents 2
- 2002: El-P – Fantastic Damage
- ~`~`: Mr. Lif – Emergency Rations EP
- ~`~`: RJD2 – Deadringer
- ~`~`: Mr. Lif – I Phantom
- 2003: RJD2 – The Horror EP
- ~`~`: Murs – The End of the Beginning
- ~`~`: S.A. Smash – Smashy Trashy
- ~`~`: Party Fun Action Committee – Let's Get Serious
- ~`~`: C-Rayz Walz – Ravipops (The Substance)
- ~`~`: Aesop Rock – Bazooka Tooth
- 2004: Various Artists – Def Jux Presents 3
- ~`~`: Murs & 9th Wonder – Murs 3:16: The 9th Edition
- ~`~`: RJD2 – Since We Last Spoke
- ~`~`: Hangar 18 – The Multi-Platinum Debut Album
- ~`~`: C-Rayz Walz – We Live: The Black Samurai EP
- ~`~`: Rob Sonic – Telicatessen
- ~`~`: El-P – Collecting the Kid
- 2005: Aesop Rock – Fast Cars, Danger, Fire and Knives EP
- ~`~`: The Perceptionists – Black Dialogue
- ~`~`: C-Rayz Walz – Year of the Beast
- ~`~`: Cage – Hell's Winter
- 2006: Cool Calm Pete – Lost
- ~`~`: Mr. Lif – Mo' Mega
- 2007: Various Artists – Definitive Swim
- 2007: El-P – I'll Sleep When You're Dead
- ~`~`: Aesop Rock – None Shall Pass
- ~`~`: Rob Sonic – Sabotage Gigante
- ~`~`: Junk Science – Gran'dad's Nerve Tonic
- ~`~`: Hangar 18 – Sweep the Leg
- 2008: Sonic Sum – Films
- ~`~`: Del the Funky Homosapien – Eleventh Hour
- ~`~`: Dizzee Rascal – Maths + English
- ~`~`: Chin Chin – Chin Chin
- ~`~`: The Mighty Underdogs – Droppin' Science Fiction
- 2009: Chin Chin – The Flashing, The Fancing
- ~`~`: Cage – Depart From Me
- ~`~`: Various Artists – Def Jux Presents 4
- 2010: Camu Tao – King of Hearts

== Catalog ==
This list is organized by catalog number, a roughly chronological number system established by the label and typically printed on or assigned to each official release. Official pressings on the Definitive Jux are cataloged by the acronym "DJX", while downloadable releases are cataloged by "DRX". Both are presented below.

Year	No.	Artist(s)	Title
2000	1	Mr. Lif	"Front on This"
2000	2	Company Flow	"D.P.A."
2001	3	Mr. Lif	Enters the Colossus
2001	4	Mr. Lif	"Cro-Magnon"
2001	5	various artists	Def Jux Presents
2001	6	Cannibal Ox	"Vein"
2001	7	Cannibal Ox	The Cold Vein
2001	8	RJD2	"June"
2001	9	Aesop Rock	"Coma"
2001	10	Masai Bey	"Paper Mache"
2001	11	Aesop Rock	"Boombox"
2001	12	RJD2	"Let the Good Times Roll" (sampler)
2001	13	Aesop Rock	Labor Days
2001	14	Cannibal Ox	"The F-Word" (promo)
2001	15	Cannibal Ox	"The F-Word"
2001	16	various artists	"Fondle 'Em Fossils"
2001	17	El-P	"Stepfather Factory"
2001	18	Yakballz	"The Freakshow"
2001	19	various artists	Farewell Fondle 'Em
2002	20	The Weathermen / Mr. Lif & Murs	split
2002	21	Aesop Rock	Daylight
2002	22	various artists	Def Jux Presents 2
2002	23	Camu Tao	"Wireless"
2002	24	El-P	El-P Presents Cannibal Oxtrumentals
2002	25	El-P	"Deep Space 9 mm"
2002	26	Mr. Lif	"Home of the Brave"
2002	27	El-P	Fantastic Damage
2002	28	El-P	"Truancy"
	29	–	–
2002	30	Mr. Lif	Emergency Rations
2002	31	El-P	"Dead Disnee"
2002	32	Mr. Lif	Emergency Rations Instrumentals
2002	33	El-P	Fandamstrumentals
2002	34	RJD2	"Let the Good Times Roll"
2003	35	RJD2	Deadringer
2002	36	Mr. Lif	"New Man Theme"
2002	37	Mr. Lif	I Phantom
	38	–	–
2002	39	El-P	FanDam Plus
2002	40	Mr. Lif	I Phantom Instrumentals
2002	41	El-P	Remix'd
	42	–	–
	43	–	–
	44	–	–
2002	45	Mr. Lif	"Live From The Plantation" picture disc
2002	46	RJD2	"The Horror"
2003	47	MURS	"Gods Work"
2003	48	MURS	The End of the Beginning
2003	49	The Presence	"Woke"
	50	–	–
2003	51	RJD2	The Horror
2003	52	S.A. Smash	"Gangsta"
2003	53	MURS	"Risky Business"
	54	–	–
2003	55	S.A. Smash	Smashy Trashy
	56	C-Rayz Walz	"White Label"
2002	57	MURS	"Transitionz Az a Ridah"
	58	various artists	Phase2 Mega Mix
2003	59	Party Fun Action Committee	"Beer"
2003	60	RJD2	"Sell the World"
2003	61	S.A. Smash	Smashy Trashy Instrumentals
2003	62	C-Rayz Walz	"The Essence"
2003	63	Party Fun Action Committee	Let's Get Serious
	64	Party Fun Action Committee	
2003	65	C-Rayz Walz	Ravipops (The Substance)
2003	66	Aesop Rock	"Limelighters"
2003	67	Aesop Rock	"Freeze"
2003	68	Aesop Rock	Bazooka Tooth
2003	69	S.A. Smash	"Illy"
	70	–	–
2003	71	Hangar 18	"Where We At"
2003	72	C-Rayz Walz	"Buck 80"
	73	–	–
2003	74	Aesop Rock	"Easy"
2004	75	The Perceptionists	"Medical Aid"
2004	76	various artists	Def Jux Presents 3
	77	–	–
2004	78	Hangar 18	"Beatslope"
2004	79	El-P	"WMR"
2004	80	MURS	Murs 3:16: The 9th Edition
2004	81	Aesop Rock	"All in All"
2004	82	MURS	"Badman"
	83	–	–
2004	84	RJD2	Since We Last Spoke
2004	85	RJD2	"Exotic Talk"
2004	86	Hangar 18	"Barhoppin"
	87	–	–
2004	88	Hangar 18	The Multiplatinum Debut Album
	89	–	–
	90	RJD2	Holy Toledo
2004	91	C-Rayz Walz	"We Live"
	92	RJD2	Two Mashed-Up Mixes 12"
2004	93	C-Rayz Walz	We Live: The Black Samurai
	94	–	–
2004	95	Rob Sonic	Telicatessen
	96	–	–
2004	97	RJD2	"1976"
2004	98	The Perceptionists	"Memorial Day"
2004	99	El-P	Collecting the Kid
2004	100	El-P	"Jukie Skate Rock"
2004	101	Aesop Rock	Build Your Own Bazooka Tooth
	102	Rob Sonic	"Shoplift"
2005	103	The Perceptionists	Black Dialogue
2005	104	The Perceptionists	"Blo"
	105	–	–
2005	106	Aesop Rock	Fast Cars, Danger, Fire and Knives
2005	107	Aesop Rock	Fast Cars, Danger, Fire and Knives
2006	126	Cool Calm Pete	Lost
	127	–	–
	128	–	–
2006	129	Mr. Lif	Mo' Mega
	130	–	–
	131	–	–
2007	132	El-P	"Everything Must Go"
	133	–	–
	134	–	–
	135	–	–
	136	–	–
2007	137	El-P	I'll Sleep When You're Dead
2007	138	El-P	"Smithereens"
	139	–	–
	140	–	–
	141	–	–
	142	–	–
2007	143	Aesop Rock	"Coffee"
2007	144	Aesop Rock	None Shall Pass
	145	–	–
	146	–	–
	147	–	–
2007	148	Rob Sonic	"Rock the Convoy"
2007	149	Rob Sonic	Sabotage Gigante
2007	150	Junk Science	Gran'Dad's Nerve Tonic
2007	151	Hangar 18	"Think Big"
2007	152	Hangar 18	Sweep the Leg
	153	–	–
	154	Sonic Sum	Films
2007	155	Aesop Rock	"None Shall Pass"
2008	156	Del tha Funkee Homosapien	Eleventh Hour
2009	157	Danny!	"Just Friends"
	158	–	–
	159	–	–
	160	–	–
	161	–	–
	162	–	–
	163	–	–
	164	–	–
	165	–	–
	166	–	–
	167	–	–
	168	–	–
	169	–	–
	170	–	–
	171	–	–
	172	–	–
	173	–	–
	174	–	–
	175	–	–
	176	–	–
	177	–	–
	178	–	–
	179	–	–
	180	–	–
	181	–	–
	182	–	–
	183	–	–
2009	184	various artists	Def Jux Presents IV

"–" denotes unassigned catalog numbers.

=== Downloadable releases (DRX) ===
Year	No.	Artist(s)	Title
	1	–	–
	2	–	–
2005	3	various artists	Bucket of B-Sides Vol. 1
	4	–	–
2007	5	Hangar 18	"Baking Soda"
2007	6	Rob Sonic	"Fatman and Littleboy"
	7	Despot	"Crap Artists"
	8	Cage	"Days"
	9	Mr. Lif	"Brothaz"
	10	El-P	"Everything Must Go"
	11	–	–
	12	–	–
2006	13	Aesop Rock	"Fishtales"
	14	Cage	"Shhot Frank (remix)"
	15	Mr. Lif	"Brothaz (Cassettes Won't Listen remix)"
	16	Cage	"Too Heavy for Cherubs - Live In Miami"
2005	17	Cannibal Ox	Return of the Ox: Live at CMJ
	18	Cage	"Good Morning - Live"
	19	Mr. Lif	"Fries (Abdul Malik remix)"
	20	Hangar 18	"Who Said it Best"
	21	Slow Suicide Stimulus	Slow Suicide Stimulus
	22	Hangar 18	Baking Soda – Recut Recooked Remixed
	23	Danny!	Charm
	24	Junk Science	"Hey!"
2007	25	Cool Calm Pete	Loosies – Remixes and Other Oddities
2008	26	Aesop Rock	"Ghosts of the Barbary Coast"
