= Mr. Lif discography =

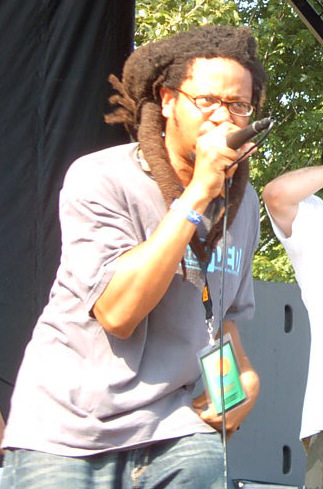
- Mr. Lif in concert
- Studio albums: 3
- Extended plays: 2
- Live albums: 1
- Compilation albums: 2
- Singles: 10
- Music videos: 4
- Guest appearances: 43
- Production credits: 10
- Compilation appearances: 14

The discography of Mr. Lif, an American hip hop artist from Boston, Massachusetts, consists of three full-length studio albums, two EPs, one live album, two compilation albums and ten singles. Four music videos for his songs have been produced.

Mr. Lif made his recording debut in 1997 with the self-produced song "This Won" on the Boston compilation Rebel Alliance. His debut vinyl single, "Elektro", was released on Nos Productions in 1998. This was followed by two more singles, "Triangular Warfare" and "Farmhand" (both in 1999), released on Brick Records and Beastie Boys' Grand Royal, respectively. Mr. Lif then signed to El-P's Definitive Jux label and released two EPs—Enters the Colossus in 2000 and Emergency Rations in 2002—before releasing his debut full-length, the concept album I Phantom, in 2002. Mr. Lif's second album, Mo' Mega, was released on Definitive Jux in 2006. His third album, I Heard It Today was released in 2009 on Mr. Lif's own label Bloodbot Tactical Enterprises. He has also made many appearances on other artists' tracks and on compilations. Releases with his group The Perceptionists are not included.

== Albums ==
=== Studio albums ===
Year	Title	Peak chart positions			Notes
Year	Title	US R&B	US Heat.	US Ind.	Notes
2002	I Phantom: Released: September 17, 2002; Label: Definitive Jux (DJX037)	80	20	16	*Debut full-length solo album.
2006	Mo' Mega: Released: June 13, 2006; Label: Definitive Jux (DJX129)	—	27	31	
2009	I Heard It Today: Released: April 21, 2009; Label: Bloodbot Tactical Enterprises	—	—	—	
2016	Don't Look Down: Released: April 15, 2016; Label: Mello Music Group	—	—	—	
"—" denotes items which were not released in that country or failed to chart.

=== Live albums ===
Year	Title
2002	Live at the Middle East: Released: January 22, 2002; Label: Ozone Music (OZO88832)

== Compilation albums ==
Year	Title	Notes
2003	Sleepyheads: Unreleased and Hard To Find: Released: October 23, 2003; Label: Thought Wizard Productions (TW001-2)	*A collection of hard to find and previously unreleased songs.
2007	Sleepyheads II (Classic Combos): Released: March 23, 2007; Label: Thought Wizard Productions (TW001-3)	*A collection of collaborations with other artists.
2008	Sleepyheads III: Released: 2008; Label: Thought Wizard Productions	*A collection of unreleased tracks

== Extended plays ==
Year	Title	Peak chart positions		Notes
Year	Title	US Heat.	US Ind.	Notes
2000	Enters the Colossus: Released: November 14, 2000; Label: Definitive Jux (DJX003)	—	—	*Debut EP.
2002	Emergency Rations: Released: June 25, 2002; Label: Definitive Jux (DJX030)	38	28	

"—" denotes releases that did not chart.

== Singles ==
Year	Title	Album
1998	"Elektro": B-Side: "The Nothing"; Label: Nos Productions (NOS001)	non-album single*
1999	"Triangular Warfare": B-Side: "Inhuman Capabilities"; Label: Brick Records (BRK006)	non-album single*
1999	"Farmhand": B-Side: "Settle the Score"; Label: Grand Royal (GR085)	non-album single*
2000	"Front on This": B-Side: "Be Out"; Label: Definitive Jux (DJX001)	Enters the Colossus
2001	"Cro-Magnon": B-Side: "Fulcrum", "Retrospect"; Label: Definitive Jux (DJX004)	Enters the Colossus
2002	"Home of the Brave": B-Side: "The Unorthodox"; Label: Definitive Jux (DJX026)	Emergency Rations
2002	"New Man Theme": B-Side: "Pull Out Your Cut", "Phantom"; Label: Definitive Jux (DJX036)	I Phantom
2002	"Return of the B-Boy": Label: Definitive Jux (DJX038)	I Phantom
2003	"Live from the Plantation": B-Side: "Return of the B-Boy"; Limited edition picture vinyl; Label: Definitive Jux (DJX045)	I Phantom
2006	"Brothaz": B-Side: "Brothaz" (9th Wonder Remix); Label: Definitive Jux (DJX131)	Mo' Mega

*Later collected on Sleepyheads: Unreleased and Hard To Find.

== Music videos ==
Year	Song	Director
2001	"Because They Made It That Way"	Ethan Lader
2002	"Live from the Plantation"	Ian Levasseur
2002	"Return of the B-Boy"	Plates Animation
2006	"Brothaz"	Andrew Gura
2009	"The Sun"	Luis Servera
2013	"Boston Strong"	Ethan Goldhammer

== As featured artist ==
Year	Title	Artist	Director
2009	The Gauntlet (Scanz featuring Mr. Lif & Akrobatik)	Scanz	Bunker Seyfert
2009	Pull Out Your Cut (Dj Hype featuring Mr. Lif)	Dj Hype	
2011	Culture of Fear (Thievery Corporation featuring Mr. Lif)	Thievery Corporation	Robin Bell
2011	Machine (Anomie Belle featuring Mr. Lif)	Anomie Belle	Bogdan Darev
2011	Swipe Da Funk (Ape the Grim featuring Mr. Lif & Nabo Rawk)	Ape the Grim	Doug York

== Guest appearances ==
Year	Song	Artist	Album
2000	"Speech Cobras"	Jedi Mind Tricks	Violent By Design
2001	"Operating Correctly"	7L & Esoteric	The Soul Purpose
2002	"Blood"	El-P	Fantastic Damage
2002	"Rapperfection"	Edan	Primitive Plus
2003	"Wreck Dem"	Akrobatik	Balance
2003	"11:35"	Aesop Rock	Bazooka Tooth
2003	"Blue on Blue"	Dave Clarke	Devil's Advocate
2003	"360 Degrees"	Push Button Objects	Ghetto Blaster
2003	"The Show Starter (Walkman Remix)"	DJ Fakts One	"Grown Folks" 12"
2003	"Huevos with Jeff and Rani"	Prefuse 73	One Word Extinguisher
2003	"Pull Out Your Cut (Remix)" "Pull Out Your Cut"	DJ Hype*	"Ubiquitous" 12"
2003	"That One Song with Lif"	El-P	Weareallgoingtoburninhell
2004	"Nosferatu"	DJ Krush	Jaku
2005	"Making Planets"	Edan	Beauty and the Beat
2006	"Storm"	Cut Chemist	The Audience's Listening
2008	"Beast Mode"	Akrobatik	Absolute Value
2011	"Culture of Fear"	Thievery Corporation	Culture of Fear
2013	"Eagle"	Figure	Horns of the Apocalypse
2017	"To the Core"	Ben Shorr	Pyrokinesis

* not to be confused with the London-based Drum and Bass producer of the same name

== Appearances on compilations ==
Year	Tracks	Album	Other contributing artists
2001	"Low Key"	Tags of the Times 3	Company Flow, BMS, 3 Melancholy Gypsys
2002	"Sneak Preview", "Fulcrum"	Def Jux Presents 2	Murs ("Sneak Preview"), Opio ("Fulcrum")
2005	"Be Out"	Bucket of B-Sides Vol. 1	
2007	"Red October"	Definitive Swim	
2007	"They Call Me Mr. Tibbs Main Title"	Cinematic: Classic Film Music Remixed	Quincy Jones remixed by King Britt
2007	"Storm"	Stomp the Yard OST	Cut Chemist, Edan

== See also ==
- Definitive Jux discography
