= El-P discography =

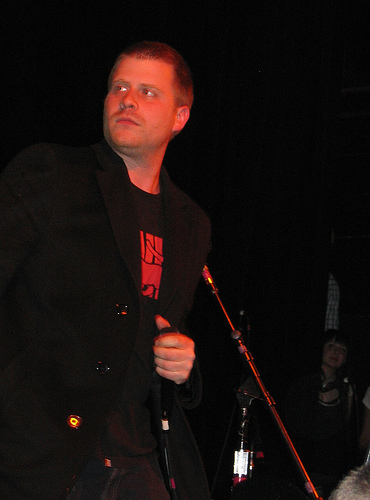
- El-P in concert
- Studio albums: 3
- Singles: 11
- Music videos: 5
- Instrumental albums: 5
- Production credits: 25
- Guest appearances: 22
- Remixes: 10

El-P (real name Jaime Meline, also known as El-Producto) is a New York–based hip hop artist and co-founder, owner, and CEO of Definitive Jux Records. His discography consists of three solo studio albums, five instrumental albums, two mix tapes, and eleven singles. He has also appeared on numerous other artist's recordings as either a guest vocalist or producer. Releases from Company Flow, The Weathermen, and Run the Jewels, all of which El-P has been a member, are not included in this discography: only solo material.

El-P's early career and rise to prominence was as part of Company Flow, formed in 1992, consisting of El-P, Mr. Len, Bigg Jus. Following the break-up of the group, El-P started his own record label, Definitive Jux. El-P produced early records from the label, including Cannibal Ox's critically acclaimed The Cold Vein and his own debut solo album, Fantastic Damage. El-P released his second solo album, I'll Sleep When You're Dead, in 2007.

El-P has contributed as producer and guest vocalist to albums by artists such as DJ Krush, Aesop Rock, Murs, Cage, Mr. Lif, Prefuse 73, Del tha Funkee Homosapien, Mike Ladd, and Atmosphere, among many others. He collaborated with Alec Empire on the first Handsome Boy Modeling School album and with Cage and Chino Moreno on the second. El-P also provided the soundtrack for the graffiti film Bomb the System.

== Albums ==
=== Studio albums ===
Year	Title	Peak chart positions					Notes
Year	Title	US	US R&B	US Heat.	US Ind.	US Int.	Notes
2002	Fantastic Damage: Released: May 14, 2002; Label: Definitive Jux (DJX #27)	198	82	9	14	—	
2007	I'll Sleep When You're Dead: Released: March 20, 2007; Label: Definitive Jux (DJX #137)	78	55	—	6	78	
2012	Cancer 4 Cure: Released: May 22, 2012; Label: Fat Possum Records	71	7	—	15	—	
"—" denotes releases that did not chart.

=== Instrumental albums ===
Year	Title	US Ind. peak	Notes
2002	El-P Presents Cannibal; Oxtrumentals: Released: March 19, 2002; Label: Definitive Jux (DJX #24)	—	Instrumental version of The Cold Vein by Cannibal Ox (2001).
2002	FanDam Plus: Released: October 1, 2002; Label: Definitive Jux (DJX #39)	—	Instrumental version of Fantastic Damage.; Also includes a second disc with remixes, lyrics, and video footage.
2004	High Water: Released: March 9, 2004; Label: Thirsty Ear Recordings	46	Made in conjunction with jazz pianist Matthew Shipp and The Blue Series Continuum.
2004	Collecting the Kid: Released: October 19, 2004; Label: Definitive Jux (DJX #99)	—	Limited-edition album collecting instrumentals from various side projects such as High Water, Bomb the System soundtrack, and Central Services.
2010	Weareallgoingtoburninhellmegamixx3: Label: Gold Dust	—	Third installment in the Weareallgoingtoburninhellmeggamixx series.
2020	Capone (Original Motion Picture Soundtrack): Label: Milan Records	—	Original score to the Josh Trank film
"—" denotes releases that did not chart.

=== Miscellaneous ===
Year	Title	Notes
2001	Shards of Pol-Pottery (with Alec Empire): Label: Digital Hardcore Recordings	Extended play featuring a re-production of the song "Megaton B-Boy" from the 1999 Handsome Boy Modelling School album So... How's Your Girl?.; Features 12 versions of the song, including remixes, instrumentals, and an a cappella.
2003	Weareallgoingtoburninhell: Label: Definitive Jux	Mixtape sold only at shows, by the New York native shortly after September 11, 2001.
2008	Weareallgoingtoburninhellmegamixx2: Label: Definitive Jux	Double CD mixtape sold only at shows.

== Singles ==
Year	Title	Album
2001	"Stepfather Factory"	Definitive Jux Presents II / Fantastic Damage
2002	"Deep Space 9mm"	Fantastic Damage
2002	"Dead Disnee"	Fantastic Damage
2002	"Truancy"	Fantastic Damage
2002	"Remix'd"	FanDam Plus
2002	"Dead Light"	N/A
2003	"Sunrise Over Bklyn"	High Water
2004	"Jukie Skate Rock"	Collecting the Kid
2006	"Everything Must Go"	I'll Sleep When You're Dead
2007	"Smithereens"	I'll Sleep When You're Dead
2007	"Flyentology"	I'll Sleep When You're Dead
2012	"The Full Retard"	Cancer 4 Cure

== Guest appearances ==
Year	Track(s)	Album	Artist(s)
1998	"Trapped in Three Dimensions"	Bad Blood	Ice
1999	"Looking Over a City"^{†}	Quannum Spectrum	Latyrx
1999	"Viagra"	U.S.S.R. Life from the Other Side	DJ Vadim
1999	"Megaton B-Boy"	So... How's Your Girl?	Handsome Boy Modeling School
2000	"Seven" (featuring J-Treds, J-Live, Mr. Complex)	LIberty	Masterminds
2000	"NY2K"	Full Blast	Ancients
2000	"Protective Custody"	Hip Hop for Respect	Breezly Brewin, Dante, El P, Imani Uzuri, Jah-Born, John Forte, Main Flow, Mr. Khaliyl, Mr. Len, Nine, Punchline, Talib Kweli, Tiye Phoenix, What?What?*
2000	"Offspring"^{†}	Both Sides of the Brain	Del tha Funkee Homosapien
2001	"Homecoming"^{†}	Lucy Ford: The Atmosphere EPs	Atmosphere
2001	"We Can Build You"	The Brotherhood of the Bomb	Techno Animal
2001	"The Beginning" (featuring Vast Aire & BMS)^{†}	12"	Paper Mache
2001	"Ox out the Cage"^{†} "Ridiculoid"^{†}	The Cold Vein	Cannibal Ox
2001	"Freestyle (Interlude) [Live]"	Farewell Fondle 'Em	[El-P & J-Treds]
2002	"Nickel Plated Pockets"^{†}	Daylight	Aesop Rock
2002	"Phantom"^{†}	Emergency Rations	Mr. Lif
2002	"Deadlight"^{†}	Urban Renewal Project	El-P
2002	"Same As It Never Was"^{†}"Dr. Hell No and the Praying Mantis"^{†} "Stepfather Factory"^{†}	Definitive Jux Presents II	[El-P & Vast Wire] [El-P]
2002	"Post Mortem" (featuring Akrobatic & Jean Grae)^{†}	I Phantom	Mr. Lif
2003	"The Dance"^{†}	The End of the Beginning	MURS
2003	"Suburb Party"	Beauty Party	The Majesticons
2003	"Phat Chance of the Felonious Monks"	Affordable Magic	Huge Voodoo
2003	"City of Shit"^{†}	Love & Hate	Aceyalone
2003	"We're Famous"^{†}	Bazooka Tooth	Aesop Rock
2004	"WMR"^{†} "Oxycontin, Pt. 2"^{†}	Def Jux Presents 3	[El- P & Camu Tao] [El-P & Cage]
2004	"God Is an Atheist"^{†}	The Green CD/DVD	Non Phixion
2004	"The Hours" (featuring Chino Moreno and Cage)	White People	Handsome Boy Modeling School
2005	"Rickety Rackety" (featuring Camu Tao & Tame One)	Fast Cars, Danger, Fire and Knives	Aesop Rock
2005	"First Words Worse"	Year of the Beast	C-Rayz Walz
2005	"Hideyaface" (featuring Ghostface Killah)^{†}	Surrounded by Silence	Prefuse 73
2005	"Good Morning"^{†} "Left It to Us" (featuring Aesop Rock, Yak Ballz & Tame One)	Hell's Winter	Cage
2006	"Take, Hold, Fire" (featuring Aesop Rock)^{†}	Mo' Mega	Mr. Lif
2007	"Gun for the Whole Family"^{†}	None Shall Pass	Aesop Rock
2008	"All the Cash"	They Live	Evil Nine
2010	"Sit Down, Man"	Sit Down, Man	Das Racist
2010	"KILL Me"^{†}	King of Hearts	Camu Tao
2011	"The Last Huzzah!" (featuring Danny Brown, Despot & Das Racist)	Lost in Translation	Mr. Muthafuckin' eXquire
2011	"Shut Up, Man"^{†}	Relax	Das Racist
2012	"Sirens"	Without You	Nick Hook
2012	"Butane (Champion's Anthem)"^{†}	R.A.P. Music	Killer Mike
2012	"Shit Starters" (featuring Agallah)	Payback	Danny!
2012	"Piss Test (Remix)"	Fool's Gold Presents: Loosies	A-Trak, Juicy J, Flatbush Zombies, Jim Jones
2013	"Severed Heads of State"^{†}	The Grimy Awards	Ill Bill
2021	"Pravda" (featuring Black Thought, Tha God Fahim, Mach-Hommy)	Dump YOD	Your Old Droog
2022	"Heavy Water" (featuring Breeze Brewin)	Aethiopes	Billy Woods
2023	"The Gods Must Be Crazy"^{†}	We Buy Diabetic Test Strips	Armand Hammer
2023	"Don't Let the Devil" (featuring thankugoodsir)^{† (co-produced by No I.D.)}	Michael	Killer Mike
2023	"Big Youth"	Goodnight, God Bless, I Love U, Delete.	Crosses
2025	"Glib Tongued"	Death Hilarious	Pigs Pigs Pigs Pigs Pigs Pigs Pigs
2025	"It Factor"	Come Back Around	Boldy James & Real Bad Man
2025	"Corinthians"^{†}	Golliwog	Billy Woods

"†" denotes tracks which also feature production by El-P

== Remixes ==
Year	Remixed track	Released on	Artist(s)
1999	Juggle Tings Proper (Madness, Microchips & Hi-Tech War Mix)	Brand New Second Hand	Roots Manuva
2004	"Beatslope"	Def Jux Presents 3	Hangar 18
2004	"Constellation (Heavenly Bodies)"	Bird Up - The Charlie Parker Remix Project	Stephanie Vezina
2005	"Goodnight Goodnight"	"Goodnight Goodnight" 12-inch	Hot Hot Heat
2005	"Hideyaface"	"Hideyaface" 12-inch	Prefuse 73, Ghostface KIllah
2005	"Only"	"Only" 12-inch vinyl // "Every Day Is Exactly the Same" 12"	Nine Inch Nails
2005	"Scarecrow"	Guerolito	Beck
2006	"Fondle 'em Fossils"	Bucket of B-Sides Vol. 1	Breeze, Q-Unique, Godfather Don, J-Treds and MF Doom
2006	"Hours"	Return to Cookie Mountain	TV on the Radio
2006	"Someday Sometimes"	Syd Matters	Syd Matters
2007	"Where's da G's"	Maths + English	Dizzee Rascal
2008	"Goliath"	The Bedlam in Goliath	The Mars Volta
2008	"The Jimmy Choos"	She Loves Everybody EP	Chester French
2009	"I Got This"	ATL RMX	Young Jeezy
2012	"Hammer Dance"	The Leak	Slaughterhouse
2014	"Keep It Healthy"	Pitchfork	Warpaint
2015	"Meowpurrdy"	Meow the Jewels	Run the Jewels
2018	"Supercut (El-P Remix)" [feat. Run the Jewels]	Non-album single	Lorde

== Production credits ==
Year	Track(s)	Album	Artist
1997	Fire in Which You Burn^{†}	Soundbombing	Indelible MCs
1997	Nightwork	Soundbombing	Sir Menelik
1998	Weight^{†}	Lyricist Lounge, Volume One	Indelible MCs
1999	Deception Part 2: Turmoil	Deception 12"	Blackalicious
1999	Patriotism^{†}	Soundbombing II	Company Flow
1999	Looking Over a City^{†}	Quannum Spectrum	Latyrx
2000	"Offspring"^{†}	Both Sides of the Brain	Del tha Funkee Homosapien
2000	"Arise"	Enters the Colossus	Mr. Lif
2001	DPA (As Seen on TV)^{†} Simian D^{†} Iron Galaxy Straight off the Dic Simple^{†}	Def Jux Presents	Various
2001	"Paper Mache" "The Beginning"	12"	Masei Bey
2001	"Homecoming"	Lucy Ford: The Atmosphere EP's	Atmosphere
2001	—	The Cold Vein	Cannibal Ox
2001	"Life's Ill" "Metal Gear"	The F Word 12"	Cannibal Ox
2002	"Nickel Plated Pockets"^{†}	Daylight EP	Aesop Rock
2002	"Same As It Never Was"^{†} "Sneak Preview" "Paper Mache" "Dr. Hell No and the Praying Mantis"^{†} "Stepfather Factory"^{†}	Def Jux Presents 2	Various
2002	"Trainbuffer" "Deadlight"^{†‡}	Urban Renewal Program	Aesop Rock El-P
2002	"Phantom"^{†}	Emergency Rations	Mr. Lif
2002	"Holdin a Jar 2"	Movies for the Blind	Cage
2002	"A Glimpse at the Struggle" "Return of the B-Boy" "Success" "Daddy Dearest" "The Now" "Post Mortem"^{†}	I Phantom	Mr. Lif
2003	"The Dance"^{†} "Def Cover"	The End of the Beginning	Murs
2003	"Illy"	Smashy Trashy	S.A. Smash
2003	—	Ravipops (The Substance)	C-Rayz Walz
2003	"We're Famous"^{†}	Bazooka Tooth	Aesop Rock
2003	"City of Shit"^{†}	Love & Hate	Aceyalone
2004	"Beatslope" (El-P Remix) "WMR"^{†} "Oxy Part 2"^{†} {co-produced by Belief}	Def Jux Presents 3	Various
2004	—	Murs 3:16: The 9th Edition	MURS
2004	"Submerged"	Waterworld	Leak Bros.
2004	"God Is an Atheist"^{†}	The Green CD/DVD	Non Phixion
2004	—	Telicatessen	Rob Sonic
2004	"All the Way Hype"	Space Tech Banana Clip 12"	Babbletron
2004	—	We Live: The Black Samurai	C-Rayz Walz
2005	"People 4 Prez" "Blō" "Frame Rupture"	Black Dialogue	The Perceptionists
2005	"Turbo Connections"	Common Man Connections	The Presence
2005	"Paradise"	Year of the Beast	C-Rayz Walz
2005	"Good Morning"^{†} "Too Heavy for Cherubs"^{‡} "Stripes"^{‡} "Perfect World" (as Central Services)^{‡} "Subtle Art of the Breakup Song" "Lord Have Mercy" "Hell's Winter"	Hell's Winter	Cage
2005	"Vein" "Raspberry Fields" "From the Planet of Eat"	Return of the Ox: Live at CMJ	Cannibal OX
2005	"Small Town"	Dusted Dons	Dusted Dons
2006	"Collapse" "Ultra Mega" "Brothaz" "The Fries" "Take, Hold, Fire"^{†} "Long Distance" "Mo' Mega" "Looking In"	Mo' Mega	Mr. Lif
2007	"Gun for the Whole Family"^{†}	None Shall Pass	Aesop Rock
2009	"Nothing Left to Say" "I Lost It in Havertown" "Teenage Hands"^{‡} "Eating Its Way Out of Me"	Depart From Me	Cage
2010	"Kill Me"^{†}	King of Hearts	Camu Tao
2010	"Mean Streak"	Crown of Thorns	Rakaa
2011	"Shut Up, Man"^{†}	Relax	Das Racist
2011	"Fire Marshall Bill" "Chicken Spot Rock" "Cockmeat Sandwich/Pissin' Between Train Cars" "Build-A-Bitch" "No Time"	Lost in Translation	Mr. Muthafuckin' eXquire
2012	—	R.A.P. Music	Killer Mike
2012	"Telephuk"	Power & Passion	Mr. Muthafuckin' eXquire
2013	"Severed Heads of State"^{†}	The Grimy Awards	Ill Bill
2013	"Stephanie (Super Ugly)"	Non-album single	Jabee
2015	"Brooklyn Gamma" (co-produced by BOOTS) "Dead Come Running" (co-produced by BOOTS) "Gallows" (co-produced by BOOTS) "Only" (co-produced by BOOTS, Carla Azar & Gabe Wax)	AQUARIA	BOOTS
2015	"Another Body"^{‡}	Fantastic Four (Original Motion Picture Soundtrack)	Marco Beltrami and Philip Glass
2016	"Axolotl" "Swimming with the Crocodiles" "Total Depravity" "Here Come the Dead"	Total Depravity	The Veils
2016	"Digging for Windows"	Non-album single	Zack de la Rocha
2018	"Marooned"^{‡}	Roma (soundtrack)	Wilder Zoby
2023	"The Gods Must Be Crazy"	We Buy Diabetic Test Strips	Armand Hammer
2023	"Don't Let the Devil"^{†} (co-produced by No ID)	Michael	Killer Mike
2024	"Detonator"	Call of Duty: Black Ops 6	Killer Mike
2025	"Corinthians"	Golliwog	Billy Woods

"—" denotes executive-production credit for the entire album/release.
"†" denotes tracks which also feature vocal performances by El-P.
"‡" denotes credit as co-producer or additional production.

== Music videos ==
=== As lead artist ===
Year	Album	Song	Director	Other featured artist
2002	Fantastic Damage	"Deep Space 9mm"	Brian Beletic	
2003	Fantastic Damage	"Stepfather Factory"	Plates Animation	
2007	I'll Sleep When You're Dead	"Smithereens"	Cassidy Gearhart	
2007	I'll Sleep When You're Dead	"Flyentology"	Daniel Garcia and Nathan Love	Trent Reznor
2010	WeareallgoingtoburninhellmeAgamixx3	"Time Won't Tell"	Shan Nicholson	
2012	Cancer 4 Cure	"The Full Retard"	Timothy Saccenti	
2012	Cancer 4 Cure	"Stay Down"	Timothy Saccenti	

=== As featured artist ===
Year	Artist	Title	Director	Other featured artist
2008	Evil Nine	All the Cash	n/c	
2011	Mr. Muthafuckin' eXquire	The Last Huzzah	Jiro Kohl & Vic Reznik	Despot, Das Racist, Danny Brown
2012	Nick Hook	Sirens	T.S. Pfeffer	Rood
2012	A-Trak	Piss Test (Remix)	?	Juicy J, Flatbush Zombies, Jim Jones, Flosstradamus
2013	Ill Bill	Severed Heads of State	Ill Bill	
2023	Killer Mike	Don't Let the Devil	David Peña	thankugoodsir
2023	Crosses	Big Youth	n/c	

== See also ==
- Definitive Jux discography
- Run the Jewels discography
