= Definitive Jux Teaser 2005 =

Def Jux Teaser 2005

Compilation album by Various Artists
- Released: March 22, 2005
- Genre: Hip hop
- Length: 30:21
- Label: Definitive Jux
- Producer: El-P, Blockhead, Pawl, RJD2, Isaiah "Ikey" Owens

Definitive Jux chronology
Definitive Jux Presents III (2004)	Def Jux Teaser 2005 (2005)	Bucket of B-Sides Vol. 1 (2005)

Professional ratings
Review scores
Source	Rating
AllMusic	3.5/5 stars

Def Jux Teaser 2005 is a 2005 compilation album released by American hip hop record label Definitive Jux.

== Critical reception ==
David Jeffries of AllMusic gave the album 3.5 stars out of 5, saying: "The risk-taking, edge-embracing hip-hop label's output is much too diverse to be represented by a mere seven songs, but Definitive Jux Teaser 2005 only needs a half-hour to let you know this label's taste is impeccable." He added, "Def Jux has done underground heads a favor by only giving them seven brilliant artists they need to follow fanatically."

== Track listing ==
No.	Title	Artist(s)	Length
1.	"The Harvest"	S.A. Smash	4:14
2.	"Fast Cars"	Aesop Rock	4:35
3.	"Walk Through"	C-Rayz Walz featuring Rob Sonic	5:06
4.	"Through the Walls (Ric Ocasek Vocal Version)"	RJD2	3:31
5.	"Shoplift (El-P Remix)"	Rob Sonic	3:50
6.	"The Razor (Ikey of the Mars Volta Remix)"	The Perceptionists	3:56
7.	"Hell's Winter"	Cage	5:09

== Personnel ==
Credits adapted from liner notes.

- Camu Tao – vocals (1)
- Metro – vocals (1)
- El-P – production (1, 5, 7)
- Aesop Rock – vocals (2)
- Blockhead – production (2)
- C-Rayz Walz – vocals (3)
- Rob Sonic – vocals (3, 5)
- Pawl – production (3)
- Ric Ocasek – vocals (4)
- RJD2 – production (4)
- Mr. Lif – vocals (6)
- Akrobatik – vocals (6)
- Isaiah "Ikey" Owens – production (6)
- Cage – vocals (7)
