= Definitive Jux Presents III =

Compilation album by various artists
- Released: March 9, 2004
- Genre: Hip hop
- Length: 60:54
- Label: Definitive Jux
- Producer: Nasa; Aesop Rock; DJ Fakts One; Rob Sonic; El-P; Arcsin; Camu Tao; Richie Malevolence; Belief; Pawl; RJD2

Definitive Jux chronology
Definitive Jux Presents II (2002)	Definitive Jux Presents III (2004)	Definitive Jux Teaser 2005 (2005)

Professional ratings
Review scores
Source	Rating
AllMusic	3/5 stars
Drowned in Sound	8/10
HipHopDX	4.0/5
Pitchfork	4.0/10
Resident Advisor	3.5/5

Definitive Jux Presents III (alternatively Def Jux Presents 3) is a 2004 compilation album released by American hip hop record label Definitive Jux. It peaked at number 22 on the Billboard Independent Albums chart.

== Track listing ==
No.	Title	Artist(s)	Length
1.	"Words from Phase 2"	Phase 2	2:00
2.	"All in All"	Aesop Rock	2:50
3.	"Make News"	Carnage	3:39
4.	"Medical Aid"	The Perceptionists	2:23
5.	"Dylsexia"	Rob Sonic	3:40
6.	"Beatslope (El-P Remix)"	Hangar 18	3:23
7.	"WMR"	El-P and Camu Tao	4:12
8.	"Homesickness"	Despot	4:50
9.	"Devil in the Hole"	S.A. Smash	3:54
10.	"Aquatic"	4th Pyramid	3:10
11.	"You're Dead to Me"	Murs	4:19
12.	"Jello"	C-Rayz Walz	4:56
13.	"Oxycontin Part 2"	El-P featuring Cage	4:39
14.	"No Jumper Cables (DJ Pawl Remix)"	Aesop Rock	3:57
15.	"Take No Chances"	Hangar 18	5:18
16.	"Clean Living"	RJD2	4:29

Bonus DVD music videos
No.	Title	Artist(s)	Length
1.	"Deep Space 9mm"	El-P	3:42
2.	"Buck 80"	C-Rayz Walz	4:00
3.	"Live from the Plantation"	Mr. Lif	3:58
4.	"Stepfather Factory"	El-P	4:11
5.	"3 Card Molly"	C-Rayz Walz	4:20
6.	"No Jumper Cables"	Aesop Rock	3:59

== Personnel ==
Credits adapted from liner notes.

- Phase 2 – vocals (1)
- James Jackson Toth – bass guitar (1), synthesizer (1)
- Nasa – production (1, 3)
- Aesop Rock – vocals (2, 14), production (2, 11)
- Carnage – vocals (3)
- Mr. Lif – vocals (4)
- Akrobatik – vocals (4)
- DJ Fakts One – turntables (4), production (4)
- Rob Sonic – vocals (5), production (5)
- Alaska – vocals (6, 15)
- Windnbreeze – vocals (6, 15)
- El-P – vocals (7, 13), production (6, 7)
- Camu Tao – vocals (7, 9), production (9)
- Despot – vocals (8)
- Arcsin – production (8, 12)
- Metro – vocals (9)
- 4th Pyramid – vocals (10)
- Richie Malevolence – production (10)
- Murs – vocals (11)
- C-Rayz Walz – vocals (12)
- Cage – vocals (13)
- Belief – production (13)
- Pawl – production (14, 15)
- RJD2 – production (16)

== Charts ==
Chart (2004)	Peak position
US Independent Albums (Billboard)	22
