= Resolution (The Perceptionists album) =

Studio album by the Perceptionists
- Released: July 28, 2017
- Genre: Hip-hop
- Length: 35:48
- Label: Mello Music Group
- Producers: Willie Evans Jr.; Synesthetic Nation; Chop; ZMY DaBeat; Paten Locke; Pas Doo; Mr. Lif; Theory Hazit; 8-BZA

The Perceptionists chronology
Black Dialogue (2005)	Resolution (2017)

Resolution is the second studio album by American hip-hop group the Perceptionists. It was released on Mello Music Group on July 28, 2017. Music videos were created for "Hose Down" and "Free at Last".

== Background ==
Shortly after the release of the Perceptionists' debut studio album, Black Dialogue, on Definitive Jux in 2005, DJ Fakts One left the group. The group's remaining members, Mr. Lif and Akrobatik, subsequently released solo material and collaborative material with other artists. In 2017, the two got signed to Mello Music Group and returned with a studio album, titled Resolution.

== Critical reception ==
Professional ratings
Review scores
Source	Rating
AllMusic	3.5/5 stars
Flood Magazine	7/10
HipHopDX	3.4/5
RapReviews.com	8/10
Vice	A−

Paul Simpson of AllMusic gave the album 3.5 out of 5 stars, stating: "Like the first Perceptionists album, Resolution maintains a heavy focus on socially conscious lyrics, calling out injustice and lamenting the disappointing state of the world." Scott Glaysher of HipHopDX gave the album a 3.4 out of 5, commenting that "Lif and Ak tackle a plethora of topics on the 11-track LP, including police, politics and big Pharma" and "the album has the tendency to come across as a conspiracy theorist's guide to 2017."

== Track listing ==
No.	Title	Producer(s)	Length
1.	"Early Mourning"	Willie Evans Jr.	3:22
2.	"Hose Down" (featuring Syne)	Synesthetic Nation	2:56
3.	"Out of Control"	Chop	3:13
4.	"Lemme Find Out"	ZMY DaBeat	2:50
5.	"When Push Comes to Shove" (featuring Dutch ReBelle)	Paten Locke	3:37
6.	"Let's Battle"	Pas Doo	2:53
7.	"Free at Last" (featuring Syne)	Synesthetic Nation	3:09
8.	"Dirty Drumz"	Mr. Lif	2:55
9.	"Grab Hold"	Paten Locke	3:25
10.	"A Different Light"	Theory Hazit	3:47
11.	"Resolution"	8-BZA	3:41
Total length:			35:48
