= Bucket of B-Sides Vol. 1 =

Compilation album by Various Artists
- Released: October 2005
- Genre: Hip hop
- Length: 59:06
- Label: Definitive Jux
- Producer: El-P, Dub-L, RJD2, Camu Tao, Pawl, Blockhead, Mr. Lif

Definitive Jux chronology
Definitive Jux Teaser 2005 (2005)	Bucket of B-Sides Vol. 1 (2005)	Definitive Swim (2007)

Bucket of B-Sides Vol. 1 is a 2005 compilation album released by American hip hop record label Definitive Jux. It featured tracks which had appeared as B-sides on some of the label's previously issued singles and EPs.

== Track listing ==
No.	Title	Artist(s)	Length
1.	"Fondle 'Em Fossils (El-P Remix)"	Breeze, Q-Unique, Godfather Don, J-Treds, and MF Doom	4:24
2.	"Rain Forever"	C-Rayz Walz	4:58
3.	"Squeegee Man Shooting (Original)"	El-P	4:47
4.	"The Beginning"	Masai Bey featuring Vast Aire and BMS	3:31
5.	"Kill 'Em All (RJD2 Remix)"	Aesop Rock	3:37
6.	"Wireless"	Camu Tao	3:51
7.	"Metal Gear"	Cannibal Ox	5:01
8.	"One Night at the Bar"	Hangar 18 featuring El-P, Camu Tao, Rob Sonic, Cryptic One, and Murs	5:43
9.	"F-Word (RJD2 Remix)"	Cannibal Ox	4:57
10.	"Beatslope (Blockhead Remix)"	Hangar 18	3:23
11.	"Final Frontier (Remix)"	RJD2 featuring Blueprint, Vast Aire, Aesop Rock, and Murs	4:13
12.	"Be Out"	Mr. Lif	3:37
13.	"Dead Disnee (Weathermen Remix)"	El-P featuring Cage, Camu Tao, Copywrite, and Vast Aire	3:53
14.	"De l'Alouette"	RJD2	3:11

== Personnel ==
Credits adapted from liner notes.

- Breeze – vocals (1)
- Q-Unique – vocals (1)
- Godfather Don – vocals (1)
- J-Treds – vocals (1)
- MF Doom – vocals (1)
- El-P – vocals (3, 8, 13), production (1, 3, 4, 7, 13)
- C-Rayz Walz – vocals (2)
- Dub-L – production (2)
- Masai Bey – vocals (4)
- Vast Aire – vocals (4, 7, 9, 11, 13)
- BMS – vocals (4)
- Aesop Rock – vocals (5, 11)
- RJD2 – production (5, 9, 11, 14)
- Camu Tao – vocals (6, 8, 13), production (6)
- Vordul Mega – vocals (7, 9)
- Alaska – vocals (8, 10)
- Windnbreeze – vocals (8, 10)
- Rob Sonic – vocals (8)
- Cryptic One – vocals (8)
- Murs – vocals (8, 11)
- Pawl – production (8)
- Blockhead – production (10)
- Blueprint – vocals (11)
- Mr. Lif – vocals (12), production (12)
- DJ Fakts One – additional vocals (12), turntables (12)
- Cage – vocals (13)
- Copywrite – vocals (13)
