= Enters the Colossus =

EP by Mr. Lif
- Released: November 14, 2000
- Recorded: 2000
- Genre: Hip-hop
- Length: 31:02
- Label: Definitive Jux
- Producers: Mr. Lif, Insight, DJ Fakts One, El-P, DJ paWL

Mr. Lif chronology
Enters the Colossus (2000)	Emergency Rations (2002)

Professional ratings
Review scores
Source	Rating
AllMusic	2.5/5 stars

Enters the Colossus is the debut EP by American hip-hop artist Mr. Lif. It was released November 14, 2000, on the Def Jux record label.

== Track listing ==
1. "DataBlend" – 3:20
  - Produced by Mr. Lif
2. "Cro-Magnon" – 3:56
  - Featuring Illin P
  - Produced by DJ Fakts One
3. "Pulse Cannon" – 3:00
  - Featuring Insight and T-Ruckus
  - Produced by Insight
4. "Enters the Colossus" – 3:08
  - Produced by Mr. Lif
  - Contains a sample from "Lyrics to Go, by A Tribe Called Quest
5. "Avengers" – 2:56
  - Featuring Akrobatik
  - Produced by DJ Fakts One
6. "Front on This" – 3:57
  - Produced by DJ paWL
7. "Arise" – 10:45
  - Produced by El-P
  - Includes bonus track "Retrospect", produced by DJ Fakts One
