= Balance (Akrobatik album) =

Studio album by Akrobatik
- Released: May 20, 2003
- Genre: Hip-hop
- Length: 59:22
- Label: Coup D'État
- Producers: T. the Beat Specialist; DJ Fakts One; Edan; Illmind; DJ Sense; Diamond D; DJ Therapy; Akrobatik; DJ Revolution; Da Beatminerz; The Accomplice; D-Tension

Akrobatik chronology
Balance (2003)	Absolute Value (2008)

Singles from Balance
- 1. "Hypocrite" Released: 2002; 2. "Remind My Soul" Released: 2003

Balance is the debut studio album by American rapper Akrobatik. It was released on May 20, 2003, by Coup D'État. It ranked at number 4 on CMJ's "Hip-Hop 2003" chart.

== Critical reception ==
Professional ratings
Review scores
Source	Rating
AllMusic	3/5 stars
Pitchfork	7.2/10
PopMatters	8/10 stars
RapReviews.com	9/10
Tiny Mix Tapes	3/5 marks

Julianne Escobedo Shepherd of Pitchfork gave the album a 7.2 out of 10, saying, "The Edan and Fakts One cuts work best with Akrobatik's style, complimenting his relatively straightforward delivery with complex, isolated drumming which sometimes unravels simple breakbeats only to embellish them with surprising, firework-clatter drum fills, confident bass buzz, and quirky funk." Dave Heaton of PopMatters gave the album 8 stars out of 10, describing it as "the work of an artist who not only has important things to say but a talent at articulating those thoughts through his music." Christopher R. Weingarten of CMJ New Music Report wrote, "Within the span of 15 tracks, he tackles misogyny, yearns to follow the proud heritage of the civil rights movement, peacefully breaks up some on-stage static, bemoans environmental destruction and still finds the time to verbally smack suckers."

== Track listing ==
No.	Title	Producer(s)	Length
1.	"Prelude to Balance"	T. the Beat Specialist	2:00
2.	"Balance"	DJ Fakts One	3:49
3.	"Hypocrite"	DJ Fakts One	2:48
4.	"The Hand That Rocks the Cradle"	Edan	2:35
5.	"Remind My Soul"	Illmind	4:00
6.	"Front Steps"	DJ Sense	4:00
7.	"Feedback" (featuring Diamond D)	Diamond D	3:25
8.	"Cooler Headz"	DJ Therapy	3:55
9.	"Wreck Dem" (featuring Mr. Lif)	Akrobatik	3:13
10.	"The Bonecrusher"	DJ Therapy	3:34
11.	"Woman Pt. II"	DJ Revolution	4:36
12.	"Always Bet on Ak"	Da Beatminerz	3:17
13.	"Limelight"	DJ Therapy	4:02
14.	"Time"	The Accomplice	4:00
15.	"Here and Now"	D-Tension	10:10
Total length:			59:22

== Personnel ==
Credits adapted from liner notes.

- Akrobatik – vocals, production (9)
- T. the Beat Specialist – production (1)
- DJ Fakts One – production (2, 3), turntables (9)
- Edan – production (4)
- Illmind – production (5)
- DJ Sense – production (6)
- Diamond D – vocals (7), production (7)
- DJ Therapy – production (8, 10, 13), turntables (8, 10)
- Mr. Lif – vocals (9)
- DJ Revolution – production (11), turntables (11)
- Da Beatminerz – production (12)
- DJ Evil Dee – turntables (12)
- The Accomplice – production (14)
- D-Tension – production (15)
- Mark Donahue – mastering
- Sam Wilson – art direction
- Tim Linberg – additional design
- Maya Hayuk – photography
