= Sleepyheads =

Compilation album by Mr. Lif
- Released: 2003
- Genre: Rap
- Length: 46:05
- Label: Thought Wizard Productions

Mr. Lif chronology
I Phantom (2002)	Sleepyheads (2003)	Mo' Mega (2006)

Professional ratings
Review scores
Source	Rating
Robert Christgau	A−

Sleepyheads is a compilation album by Mr. Lif, released in 2003 on the Thought Wizard Productions label. Many of the songs on the album had been previously released as vinyl-only singles; others had not been released at all prior to Sleepyheads.

== Track listing ==
1. "Madness in a Cup"
2. "This Won"
3. "Elektro"
4. "The Nothing"
5. "Triangular Warfare"
6. "Inhuman Capabilities"
7. "Farmhand"
8. "Settle The Score"
9. "Be Out"
10. "Because They Made It That Way"
11. "Day of Power"
12. "Night Train Radio Freestyle"
13. "Target: Gristl"
14. "Flick" (bonus)
