= Definitive Swim =

Compilation album by Various artists
- Released: February 27, 2007
- Genre: Hip hop, Indie hip hop
- Label: Williams Street, Definitive Jux

Adult Swim Music chronology
Chocolate Swim (2006)	Definitive Swim (2007)	Warm & Scratchy (2007)

Definitive Swim is a free download album released in 2007 by Adult Swim and Definitive Jux (through Williams Street Records).

== Track listing ==
1. Camu Tao – "Plot For A Little" (Clean) (2:55)
2. EL-P – "Smithereens (Stop Crying)" (Clean) (4:34)
3. Rob Sonic – "Brand New Vandals" (Clean Edit) (3:53)
4. Hangar 18 – "Think Big" (Clean) (3:35)
5. Mr. Lif & Cannibal Ox – "Brothas Remix" (Clean) (5:13)
6. Despot – "Get Rich Or Try Dying" (Clean) (4:09)
7. Cool Calm Pete – "Get With The Times" (Clean) (4:06)
8. Mr. Lif – "Red October" (Clean) (2:48)
9. Cage – "Blood Boy" (Clean) (4:11)
10. Aesop Rock – "None Shall Pass" (Clean) (4:03)
