= Don't Look Down (Mr. Lif album) =

Studio album by Mr. Lif
- Released: April 15, 2016
- Genre: Hip-hop
- Length: 36:24
- Label: Mello Music Group
- Producers: Alex "Apex" Gale; Taylor "Made" Rivelli; Caliph-Now; SlopFunkDust; Edan; Fakts One; Pas Doo; Synesthetic Nation Music

Mr. Lif chronology
I Heard It Today (2009)	Don't Look Down (2016)	The Life & Death of Scenery (2016)

Don't Look Down is the fourth solo studio album by American hip-hop artist Mr. Lif. It was released by Mello Music Group on April 15, 2016. A music video was created for "Let Go".

== Critical reception ==
Professional ratings
Review scores
Source	Rating
AllMusic	4/5 stars
HipHopDX	3.7/5
Pitchfork	7.0/10
PopMatters	7/10 stars
Vice	(2-star Honorable Mention)

Sheldon Pearce of Pitchfork gave the album a 7.0 out of 10, saying, "Don't Look Down openly acknowledges doubt but never succumbs to it, instead using it as a balance for self-righteousness." Aaron McKrell of HipHopDX gave the album a 3.7 out of 5, calling it "a captivating foray into the struggles of humanity and the way to overcome them."

On April 15, 2016, BrooklynVegan included it on the "Five Notable Releases of the Week" list. On June 14, 2016, The New York Observer placed it at number 7 on the "Best Hip-Hop Albums of 2016 (So Far)" list. Allan Raible of ABC News placed it at number 47 on the "50 Best Albums of 2016" list.

== Track listing ==
No.	Title	Producer(s)	Length
1.	"Pounds of Pressure"	Alex "Apex" Gale; Taylor "Made" Rivelli	3:24
2.	"The Abyss"	Alex "Apex" Gale	3:14
3.	"Everyday We Pray"	Taylor "Made" Rivelli	3:22
4.	"Let Go" (featuring Selina Carrera)	Caliph-Now	3:22
5.	"A Better Day" (featuring Erica Dee)	SlopFunkDust	3:36
6.	"Whizdom" (featuring Blacastan)	Edan	2:52
7.	"Mission Accomplished" (featuring The Perceptionists)	Fakts One	3:36
8.	"World Renown" (featuring Del the Funky Homosapien)	Pas Doo	3:29
9.	"Ill"	Synesthetic Nation Music	3:53
10.	"Don't Look Down"	Synesthetic Nation Music	5:36
Total length:			36:24

Bandcamp edition bonus track
No.	Title	Length
11.	"World Renown" (Dan the Automator mix; featuring Del the Funky Homosapien)	3:48
Total length:		40:12
