= The Soul Purpose =

Studio album by 7L & Esoteric
- Released: July 24, 2001
- Studios: Joe's Wax Museum; The Garden (Massachusetts); The Thingamajig Lab (New York, NY); Miss Pusskin's House (New York, NY); BassCamp (Lynnfield, MA); BPM (Boston, MA)
- Genre: Hip-hop
- Length: 1:04:44
- Label: Direct Records
- Producers: 7L; DJ Spinna; Joc Max; Raw Produce; The ARE; Vinyl Reanimators

7L & Esoteric chronology
The Soul Purpose (2001)	Dangerous Connection (2002)

Singles from The Soul Purpose
- 1. "Speaking Real Words" Released: 1999; 2. "Mic Mastery" Released: 2000; 3. "Call Me E.S." Released: 2001; 4. "Jealous Over Nothing" Released: 2001

Professional ratings
Review scores
Source	Rating
AllMusic	4/5 stars
RapReviews	9/10

The Soul Purpose is the debut studio album by American hip-hop duo 7L & Esoteric. It was released on July 24, 2001 via Direct Records. Recording sessions took place at Joe's Wax Museum, The Garden in Massachusetts, The Thingamajig Lab and Miss Pusskin's House in Brooklyn, BassCamp in Lynnfield and BPM in Boston. Production was handled by the Vinyl Reanimators, who also served as executive producers, 7L, DJ Spinna, Joc Max, Raw Produce and The ARE. It features guest appearances from Akrobatik, Apathy, Cadence, Checkmark, Inspectah Deck, Karma, Mr. Lif, Reks, Vinnie Paz and Count Bass D.

The album was preceded with four singles: "Speaking Real Words", "Mic Mastery", "Call Me E.S." and "Jealous Over Nothing". Its third single, "Call Me E.S.", became the duo's only charted single off of the album, reaching number 83 on the Hot R&B/Hip-Hop Songs and number 3 on the Hot Rap Songs in the US.

== Background ==
After years of doing guest verses for other acts, and releasing songs such as "Be Alert" on their own; the duo managed to garner significant hype in the underground hip-hop community. They even received press in The Source, and attracted enough attention to get a guest verse from Wu-Tang Clan's Inspectah Deck. All of this culminated into a distribution record deal with Landspeed Records Inc., 9 years after the group's original formation.

== Track listing ==
No.	Title	Producer(s)	Length
1.	"Dwight Spits Intro" (featuring Count Bass D)		1:00
2.	"Verbal Assault"	Vinyl Reanimators	3:32
3.	"Terror at Your Ear"	Vinyl Reanimators	3:16
4.	"Operating Correctly" (featuring Mr. Lif)	7L	4:31
5.	"Call Me E.S."	Vinyl Reanimators	3:27
6.	"My Rhyme Pt. II"		0:59
7.	"Jealous Over Nothing"	Joc Max	3:54
8.	"Chain Reaction" (featuring Vinnie Paz)	Vinyl Reanimators	3:53
9.	"Think Back"	7L	3:19
10.	"Interlude - Terra What?"		0:42
11.	"Mic Mastery"	Vinyl Reanimators	3:35
12.	"Public Execution" (featuring Reks and Apathy)	7L	3:53
13.	"You Know the Concept"	Vinyl Reanimators	4:10
14.	"Speaking Real Words" (featuring Inspectah Deck)	Vinyl Reanimators	4:11
15.	"First Letter"	7L	1:13
16.	"The Soul Purpose"	DJ Spinna	4:41
17.	"Rep the Hardest" (featuring Karma)	7L	4:01
18.	"Play It Cool"	7L	2:26
19.	"Guest List"	The ARE	3:35
20.	"State of the Art" (featuring Akrobatik, Cadence and Checkmark)	Raw Produce	4:26
Total length:			1:04:44

== Personnel ==
- Seamus "Esoteric" Ryan – vocals, sleeve notes
- George "7L" Andrinopoulos – scratches (tracks: 2, 3, 5, 7, 9, 13, 15-18), producer (tracks: 4, 9, 12, 15, 17, 18), sleeve notes
- Dwight "Count Bass D" Farrell – vocals (track 1)
- Jeffrey "Mr. Lif" Haynes – vocals (track 4)
- Vincenzo "Vinnie Paz" Luvineri – vocals (track 8)
- Corey "Reks" Christie – vocals (track 12)
- Chad "Apathy" Bromley – vocals (track 12)
- Jason "Inspectah Deck" Hunter – vocals (track 14)
- Trevor "Karma" Gendron – vocals (track 17), art direction, design, layout
- Jared "Akrobatik" Bridgeman – vocals (track 20)
- Seth "Cadence" Boyd – vocals & producer (track 20), additional vocals (track 6)
- Mark "Checkmark" Girardin – vocals (track 20)
- Vincent "DJ Spinna" Williams – scratches & producer (track 16), recording & mixing (tracks: 7, 16)
- Joe Mansfield – producer (tracks: 2, 3, 5, 8, 11, 13, 14), executive producer
- Scott Dinsdale – producer (tracks: 2, 3, 5, 8, 11, 13, 14), executive producer
- Sean Corrigan – producer (tracks: 2, 3, 5, 8, 11, 13, 14), executive producer
- Thomas "Joc Max" McIntosh – producer (track 7)
- Russell "The ARE" Gonzalez – producer & mixing (track 19)
- Damian "Pitch" Roskill – producer (track 20)
- Marlon "Marley Marl" Williams – mixing (track 14)
- Adam "Papa D!" Defalco – recording (tracks: 18, 19)
- Duncan Stanbury – mastering
- James "DJ Chaos" McEwan – sequencing
- Aimee Whitlock – photography
- Matt Slywka – A&R
