= Williams Street Records =

Adult Swim affiliated record label

- Parent company: Williams Street Productions
- Founded: 2007; 19 years ago
- Founder: Jason DeMarco
- Distributor: Alternative Distribution Alliance
- Genre: Various
- Country of origin: United States
- Location: 1065 Williams Street NW, Atlanta, Georgia, U.S.,
- Official website: adultswim.com/music

Williams Street Records LLC is an American independent record company founded by Jason DeMarco, based in Atlanta, Georgia. It is a joint venture of Warner Bros. Animation's Williams Street Productions and Warner Music Group (Warner Bros. Discovery's former record company), and is distributed through Alternative Distribution Alliance. Under that label, they have released original works of music, some of which are related to their shows on Adult Swim. The label is managed by Chris Hartley, and the A&R is Jason DeMarco.

In February 2007 (the same year the record label was founded), Cartoon Network teamed up with the independent hip-hop label Definitive Jux to produce an animated video for El-P's track "Flyentology" and release a compilation album titled Definitive Swim for free download, featuring tracks from most of the label's artists.

In October 2015, DeMarco mentioned on his Ask.fm page that Williams Street Records would no longer put out any more albums for sale, and would only release free music. Soundtrack material from Williams Street programming is currently issued by WaterTower Music.

== Albums released by the label ==
- The Dethalbum – Dethklok (2007)
- The Diary of an American Witchdoctor – Witchdoctor (2007)
- Awesome Record, Great Songs! Volume One – Tim & Eric (2008)
- The Venture Bros.: The Music of J.G. Thirlwell – J. G. Thirlwell (2009)
- Dethalbum II – Dethklok (2009)
- Another Big Night Down the Drain – Cheeseburger (2011)
- Cerebral Ballzy – Cerebral Ballzy (2011)
- R.A.P. Music – Killer Mike (2012)
- Dethalbum III – Dethklok (2012)
- If I tell U – Phaseone (2013)
- Southern Meridian – Gene the Southern Child (2014)
- Awful Swim – Father (2018)

=== Compilations ===
- Chocolate Swim (2006, co-release with Chocolate Industries)
- Definitive Swim (2007, co-release with Definitive Jux)
- Aqua Teen Hunger Force Colon Movie Film for Theaters Colon the Soundtrack (2007)
- Warm & Scratchy (2007)
- Ghostly Swim (2008, co-release with Ghostly International)
- World Wide Renewal Program (2008)
- African Swim (2008)
- Have Yourself a Meaty Little Christmas (2009)
- ATL RMX (2009)
- Adult Swim Singles Program 2010 (2010)
- Metal Swim (2010)
- Adult Swim Singles Program 2011 (2011)
- {UNCLASSIFIED} (2011)
- Squidbillies Present Music For Americans Only Made By Americans In China For Americans Only God Bless The U.S.A (2012)
- Adult Swim Singles Program 2012 (2012)
- Garage Swim (2013)
- Adult Swim Singles Program 2013 (2013)
- Adult Swim Singles Program 2014 (2014)
- Ghostly Swim 2 (2014)
- Nabuma Purple Rubberband (2015, remix album with Little Dragon)
- Adult Swim Singles Program 2015 (2015)
- Adult Swim Singles Program 2016 (2016)
- N O I S E (2016, experimental music compilation)
- LUXE (2017, dream pop/electro soul compilation)
- Adult Swim Singles Program 2017 (2017–2018)
- Metal Swim 2 (2019)
- Adult Swim Singles Program 2021 (2021)
