= Definitive Jux Presents II =

Compilation album by various artists
- Released: February 5, 2002
- Genre: Hip-hop
- Length: 50:58
- Label: Definitive Jux
- Producer: Aesop Rock; Cryptic One; El-P; Insight; Mondee; Przm; RJD2; Rob Sonic

Definitive Jux chronology
Farewell Fondle 'Em (2001)	Definitive Jux Presents II (2002)	Definitive Jux Presents III (2004)

Definitive Jux Presents II (alternatively Def Jux Presents 2) is the second full-length compilation album by American hip-hop record label Definitive Jux. Released in 2002, it serves as the sequel to 2001 compilation EP Def Jux Presents. Production was handled by El-P, Aesop Rock, Cryptic One, Insight, Mondee, Przm, RJD2 and Rob Sonic. In the United States, the album peaked at number 37 on the Billboard Independent Albums chart.

== Critical reception ==
Professional ratings
Review scores
Source	Rating
AllMusic	4/5 stars
Muzik	5/5
Pitchfork	7.8/10
RapReviews	6.5/10
The Village Voice	(choice cut)

AllMusic's Nic Kincaid called it "the most legit hip-hop compilation out in 2002 on the label most important to watch". Brad Haywood of Pitchfork wrote: "if Def Jux could be defined by any single musical element, it would be the beats", he continued: "the beats on DJP2 are dark, jagged, and intriguing, and not a single one of them could in any way be deemed 'danceable'".

== Track listing ==
No.	Title	Writer(s)	Producer(s)	Length
1.	"Same as It Never Was" (performed by The Weathermen)	Masai Bey; Tero Smith; Jaime Meline; Peter Nelson; Theodore Arrington	El-P	5:46
2.	"Dead Pan" (performed by Aesop Rock)	Ian Matthias Bavitz	Aesop Rock	3:23
3.	"Sneak Preview" (performed by Mr. Lif and Murs)	Jeffrey Haynes; Nicholas Carter	El-P	3:07
4.	"Hold the Floor" (performed by Camu Tao)	T. Smith	Przm	4:02
5.	"F.U. for Failure Ugly" (performed by Rob Sonic)	Rob Smith	Rob Sonic	4:02
6.	"I Really Like Your Def Jux Baby Tee" (performed by RJD2)	Ramble Jon Krohn	RJD2	4:34
7.	"Paper Maché" (performed by Masai Bey)	Bey	El-P	4:32
8.	"Fulcrum (Insight Mix)" (performed by Mr. Lif and Opio)	Haynes; Opio Lindsey	Insight	3:26
9.	"Dr. Hell No and the Praying Mantus" (performed by El-P and Vast Aire)	Meline; Arrington	El-P	4:38
10.	"Mic Molest" (performed by Atoms Family)	G. Calliste; Arrington; Ian Goldberg; Ian McMullin; Tim Baker	Cryptic One	6:03
11.	"Freak Show" (performed by Yak Ballz)	Yashar M. Zadeh	Mondee	3:15
12.	"Stepfather Factory" (performed by El-P)	Meline	El-P	4:10
Total length:				50:58

== Personnel ==
- Jaime "El-P" Meline – vocals (tracks: 1, 9, 12), producer (tracks: 1, 3, 7, 9, 12), executive producer
- Theodore "Vast Aire" Arrington – vocals (tracks: 1, 9, 10)
- Tero "Camu Tao" Smith – vocals (tracks: 1, 4)
- Masai Bey – vocals (tracks: 1, 7)
- Jeffrey "Mr. Lif" Haynes – vocals (tracks: 3, 8)
- Ian "Aesop Rock" Bavitz – vocals & producer (track 2)
- Robert "Rob Sonic" Smith – vocals & producer (track 5)
- Ian "Cryptic One" Goldberg – vocals & producer (track 10)
- Peter "Copywrite" Nelson – vocals (track 1)
- Nicholas "MURS" Carter – vocals (track 3)
- Opio Lindsey – vocals (track 8)
- Tim "Alaska" Baker – vocals (track 10)
- G. "Jestoneart" Calliste – vocals (track 10)
- Ian "Windnbreeze" McMullin – vocals (track 10)
- Yashar "Yak Ballz" Zadeh – vocals (track 11)
- Christopher "Przm" Sheffield – producer (track 4)
- Ramble "RJD2" Krohn – producer (track 6)
- Andre "Insight" Todman – producer (track 8)
- Armando "DJ Mondee" Torres – producer (track 11)
- Paul "DJ Pawl" Iannacchino – scratches (track 3)
- Fred "Fredones" Sepulveda – scratches (track 5)
- DJ Cip One – scratches (track 10)
- Emily Lazar – mastering

== Charts ==
Chart (2002)	Peak position
US Independent Albums (Billboard)	37
