= Absolute value (disambiguation) =

The absolute value is a value of a real number.

Absolute value may also refer to:

- Absolute value (algebra), a generalization of the absolute value of a real number
- Absolute value theorem in mathematics, also known as the "squeeze theorem"
- Absolute Value (album), the second full-length album by rapper Akrobatik
- Absolute value (ethics), a philosophical absolute independent of individual and cultural views
