= Ghostly Swim =

2008 compilation album by various artists

Compilation album by Various artists
- Released: April 22, 2008; January 27, 2009 (limited edition version)
- Genre: Electronic; indie rock; synthpop
- Length: 67:34
- Label: Williams Street; Ghostly

Adult Swim Music chronology
Warm & Scratchy (2007)	Ghostly Swim (2008)	World Wide Renewal Program (2008)

Ghostly Swim is a free digital download album released in 2008 by Adult Swim and Ghostly International (through Williams Street Records). The track listing contains songs arranged and recorded in an unusual avant-garde style of pop, rock and hip hop. A sequel album, Ghostly Swim 2, was released in 2014.

== Track listing ==
1. Michna – "Triple Chrome Dipped" (3:19)
2. Dabrye – "Temper" (2:49)
3. The Chap – "Carlos Walter Wendy Stanley" (2:56)
4. Dark Party – "Active" (4:20)
5. Tycho – "Cascade" (Live Version) (3:56)
6. JDSY – "All Shapes" (1:56)
7. Deastro – "Light Powered" (2:26)
8. Matthew Dear – "R+S" (3:44)
9. |FLYamSAM (Flying Lotus and Samiyam) – "The Offbeat" (2:18)
10. Cepia – "Ithaca" (3:37)
11. Aeroc – "Idiom"(3:34)
12. The Reflecting Skin – "Traffickers" (4:08)
13. School of Seven Bells – "Chain" (4:23)
14. Ben Benjamin – "Squirmy Sign Language" (3:13)
15. Kill Memory Crash – "Hit + Run" (5:08)
16. Osborne – "Wait A Minute" (4:00)
17. Milosh – "Then It Happened" (3:59)
18. 10:32 – "Blue Little" (4:31)
19. Mux Mool – "Night Court" (3:17)
20. Solvent – "Hung Up" (2009 bonus track)
