= Absolute Value (album) =

Studio album by Akrobatik
- Released: February 19, 2008
- Genre: Hip-hop
- Length: 52:07
- Label: Fat Beats Records
- Producers: Illmind; Da Beatminerz; J Dilla; Hezekiah; 9th Wonder; J-Zone; DJ Therapy; Tzarizm; DJ Fakts One; Baba Israel; Yako

Akrobatik chronology
Balance (2003)	Absolute Value (2008)	Built to Last (2014)

Singles from Absolute Value
- 1. "A to the K / Beast Mode" Released: 2006; 2. "Put Ya Stamp on It" Released: 2008

Absolute Value is the second studio album by Boston rapper Akrobatik. It was released on February 19, 2008 by Fat Beats Records. The album features guest appearances by hip-hop artists Talib Kweli, Chuck D, and B-Real, as well as production by 9th Wonder, Illmind, J Dilla, and Da Beatminerz. Despite receiving rave reviews, the album sold about 600 units in its opening week.

== Critical reception ==
Professional ratings
Review scores
Source	Rating
About.com	4/5 stars
AllMusic	4/5 stars
ArtofRhyme.com	4/5 stars
DJBooth.net	4/5 stars
HipHopDX	4/5 stars
HipHopLinguistics.com	4/5 stars
The Phoenix	3/4 stars
PopMatters	7/10 stars
RapReviews.com	9/10
XLR8R	7.5/10

Marisa Brown of AllMusic gave the album 4 stars out of 5, commenting that it "mixes his socially conscious messages and his battle-honed cadence, healthy ego, and energetic production (courtesy here of Illmind, Dilla, J-Zone, and 9th Wonder, among others) into a palatable but intelligent creation that entertains as much as it educates." She added, "Absolute Value has a few requisite tracks -- the melancholy 'Rain,' the sweet 'Back Home to You' -- but it also has a lot of sharp, thoughtful, fun material that knows how to keep the audience moving, both in body and mind." J-23 of HipHopDX gave the album a 4.0 out of 5, saying, "you won't find anything on this album that will have you reaching for the skip button."

Andrew Martin of PopMatters gave the album 7 stars out of 10, calling it "a strong representation of Ak's versatility as an emcee." Max Herman of XLR8R gave the album a 7.5 out of 10, writing, "the MC leaves the greatest impression when he balances his hard-hitting approach with focused subject matter as he does on the Little Brother-assisted 'Be Prepared,' a soulful examination of the rap game."

== Track listing ==
No.	Title	Producer(s)	Length
1.	"A to the K" (featuring B-Real)	Illmind	2:52
2.	"Soul Glo"	Da Beatminerz	2:38
3.	"Put Ya Stamp on It" (featuring Talib Kweli)	J Dilla	3:22
4.	"Step It Up"	Hezekiah	3:02
5.	"Rain" (featuring Brenna Gethers)	Illmind	3:11
6.	"Be Prepared" (featuring Little Brother)	9th Wonder	3:40
7.	"Absolute Value"	J-Zone	2:43
8.	"Black Hell Breaks Loose" (featuring Willie Evans Jr. and DJ Therapy)	DJ Therapy	3:36
9.	"Kindred" (featuring Chuck D and Brenna Gethers)	Illmind	4:00
10.	"Front Steps Pt. II (Tough Love)"	Tzarizm	3:34
11.	"Beast Mode" (featuring Mr. Lif)	DJ Fakts One	3:09
12.	"If We Can't Build" (featuring Bumpy Knuckles)	Illmind	3:00
13.	"Ak B. Nimble"	Baba Israel; Yako	2:55
14.	"Back Home to You"	DJ Therapy	6:35
Total length:			52:07

== Personnel ==
Credits adapted from liner notes.

- Akrobatik – vocals
- B-Real – vocals (1)
- Illmind – production (1, 5, 9, 12)
- Da Beatminerz – production (2)
- DJ Evil Dee – turntables (2)
- Talib Kweli – vocals (3)
- J Dilla – production (3)
- DJ Jayceeoh – turntables (3, 4, 6, 10, 14)
- Hezekiah – production (4)
- Brenna Gethers – vocals (5, 9)
- Little Brother – vocals (6)
- 9th Wonder – production (6)
- J-Zone – production (7)
- Willie Evans Jr. – vocals (8)
- DJ Therapy – vocals (8), production (8, 14), turntables (13)
- Chuck D – vocals (9)
- Tzarizm – production (10)
- Mr. Lif – vocals (11)
- DJ Fakts One – production (11)
- Bumpy Knuckles – vocals (12)
- Baba Israel – production (13)
- Yako – production (13)
- Buttaskotch – engineering
- Lucy Fernandes – engineering
- Ray Fernandes – engineering
- Sir Bob Nash – engineering
- Mark Donahue – mastering
- Alphabet Arm Design – art direction
- Billy Nunez – illustration
- A. Garcia – photography
