= The Conspiracy (mixtape) =

Mixtape by The Weathermen
- Released: July 3, 2003
- Genres: Hip-hop, alternative hip-hop
- Length: 53:12
- Label: Eastern Conference Records
- Producers: RJD2, Camu Tao, Przm, Johnny Dangerous, Salaam Remi, Timbaland, Just Blaze, The Neptunes, Megahertz, Kanye West, Dr. Dre, Chucky Thompson, True Master

Professional ratings
Review scores
Source	Rating
RapReviews	7/10

The Conspiracy is a studio mixtape by the New York hip-hop supergroup the Weathermen. It was released July 3, 2003 on Eastern Conference Records.

== Music ==
A large portion of the mixtape is produced respectively by Camu Tao, RJD2, Przm and Johnny Dangerous, with the rest being instrumentals used by other well known hip-hop artists such as Nas, Redman and Notorious B.I.G., among others.

== Track listing ==
No.	Title	Lyrics	Music	Length
1.	"Intro"			1:53
2.	"Made You Shit Your Pants"	Copywrite, Yak Ballz, Cage	Salaam Remi ("Made You Look")	2:51
3.	"Missy Done Justice"	El-P, Camu Tao	Timbaland ("Gossip Folks")	2:00
4.	"10 Times"	Copywrite	Przm	3:33
5.	"React Shun"	Jakki tha Motamouth, Copywrite, Tame One	Just Blaze ("React")	2:53
6.	"Illuminati Guy"			0:39
7.	"What Happen to Dat Toy"	Cage, Tame One	The Neptunes ("What Happened to That Boy")	2:20
8.	"Volume"	Yak Ballz	Camu Tao	2:12
9.	"Mhz Over Megahertz"	Jakki tha Motamouth, Copywrite, Camu Tao	Megahertz ("Gotta Make It to Heaven")	3:10
10.	"Slick Talkin"	Tame One, Breeze Brewin	J-Zone	2:25
11.	"Where I Wanna Be"	Yak Ballz, Camu Tao	Kanye West ("B R Right")	2:22
12.	"Columbus"	Jakki tha Motamouth, Copywrite	Dr. Dre ("Back Down")	2:10
13.	"Beverly Crabs"	Cage	Chucky Thompson ("Dead Wrong")	2:26
14.	"Chris Lighty"	Vast Aire, Camu Tao	Camu Tao	3:08
15.	"Come to Daddy"	Cage, Camu Tao	Camu Tao	2:33
16.	"Concerto"	Tame One	Johnny Dangerous	1:43
17.	"Gangster"	S.A. Smash	Camu Tao	3:50
18.	"Fried Fish"	Breeze Brewin, Tame One, Cage	True Master ("Fish")	2:59
19.	"5 Left in the Clip"	The Weathermen	RJD2	4:17
20.	"Every Rapper in the House Shut the Fuck Up"	Copywrite, Cage, Yak Ballz	Camu Tao	3:48
