= The Multi-Platinum Debut Album =

Studio album by Hangar 18
- Released: June 15, 2004
- Genre: Hip hop
- Length: 51:14
- Label: Definitive Jux
- Producer: DJ Pawl

Hangar 18 chronology
The Multi-Platinum Debut Album (2004)	Sweep the Leg (2007)

Singles from The Multi-Platinum Debut Album
- 1. "Where We At? / Hangar 18 and the Temple of Doom" Released: 2003; 2. "Beatslope" Released: 2004; 3. "Barhoppin'" Released: 2004

Professional ratings
Review scores
Source	Rating
Exclaim!	favorable
Stylus Magazine	C
XLR8R	favorable

The Multi-Platinum Debut Album is the first studio album by American hip hop group Hangar 18. It was released on Definitive Jux on June 15, 2004.

== Critical reception ==
Rollie Pemberton of Stylus Magazine gave the album a grade of C, saying: "Somewhat of a backhanded recommendation, Hangar 18 may still be worthy of rotation at your next house party." Thomas Quinlan of Exclaim! said: "The title of their debut album may drip with sarcasm, but even if it may not go multi-platinum, Hangar 18 have an underground classic on their hands." Ryan Romana of XLR8R called it "a satisfying listen."

On July 7, 2004, Spin included it on the "More New Music to Hear Now" list.

== Track listing ==
No.	Title	Length
1.	"Intro"	1:14
2.	"Where We At?"	2:37
3.	"Beatslope"	3:07
4.	"Go Git That"	3:33
5.	"Boombox Apocalypse"	4:00
6.	"Sadat X Appears Courtesy Of..."	3:33
7.	"Hangar 18 and the Temple of Doom"	3:15
8.	"Saved by the Beezy"	3:02
9.	"Blown Bubble"	3:04
10.	"Itcherlude"	1:14
11.	"Take No Chances"	5:18
12.	"Barhoppin'"	3:25
13.	"Hangar 101"	2:03
14.	"Keeps It Movin'"	3:52
15.	"Easier Said than Done"	4:46
16.	"Outro"	3:11
