= Ghostly Swim 2 =

Compilation album by Various artists
- Released: December 23, 2014 (digital download); April 28, 2015 (CD version)
- Genre: Electronic; ambient; house; techno; synthpop
- Length: 57:06
- Label: Williams Street; Ghostly International

Adult Swim Music chronology
Adult Swim Singles Program 2014 (2014)	Ghostly Swim 2 (2014)	Nabuma Purple Rubberband (2015)

Ghostly Swim 2 is a free digital download album released digitally in late 2014 by Adult Swim and Ghostly International (through Williams Street Records) and a CD version was released by Ghostly in April 2015. The track listing contains songs arranged and recorded in varying avant-garde styles of genres including ambient, house and techno. The album is a sequel to the two labels' previous collaborative album in 2008, Ghostly Swim.

== Track listing ==
1. Pascäal – "Holo" (3:51)
2. Shigeto – "Tide Pools" (3:07)
3. Anenon – "Grapevine" (4:21)
4. Heathered Pearls – "Supra" (2:26)
5. Babe Rainbow – "Don't Tell Me I'm Wrong"
6. Dauwd – "Kolido" (6:51)
7. Patricia – "Spotting" (5:28)
8. Lord RAJA – "Spilt Out In Cursive" (2:04)
9. CFCF – "Oil" (6:15)
10. Feral – "Mirror" (3:42)
11. Mary Lattimore and Jeff Zeigler – "I Only Have Eyes For You" (5:04)
12. AceMo – "Futurism" (3:31)
13. Nautiluss – "Lonely Planet" (6:46)
14. Galcher Lustwerk - "In The Place" (CD bonus track)
