= Dangerous Connection =

Studio album by 7L & Esoteric
- Released: October 8, 2002
- Studio: Boston Butta Beats (Boston, MA); D-Son's Nicklindime Spot (Boston, MA); Iacron Studios
- Genre: Hip-hop
- Length: 46:04
- Label: Brick; Landspeed
- Producer: 7L; Beyonder; KutMasta Kurt; Stoupe the Enemy of Mankind

7L & Esoteric chronology
| The Soul Purpose (2001) | Dangerous Connection (2002) | DC2: Bars of Death (2004) |

Professional ratings
Review scores
| Source | Rating |
|---|---|
| IGN | 7/10 |
| MVRemix | 8/10 |
| RapReviews | 9.5/10 |

Dangerous Connection is the second studio album by American underground hip-hop duo 7L & Esoteric. It was released on October 8, 2002, via Brick/Landspeed Records. Recording sessions took place at Boston Butta Beats and D-Son's Nicklindime Spot in Boston, and Iacron Studios. Production was handled by DJ 7L, Beyonder, KutMasta Kurt and Stoupe the Enemy of Mankind. It features guest appearances from Apathy, Beyonder, Count Bass D, J-Live and Vinnie Paz.

== Track listing ==
| No. | Title | Writer(s) | Producer(s) | Length |
|---|---|---|---|---|
| 1. | "One Six" | Seamus Ryan | 7L | 1:37 |
| 2. | "Watch Me" | Ryan | 7L | 3:54 |
| 3. | "Warning - Knife in the Face" | Ryan | 7L | 3:32 |
| 4. | "Terrorist's Cell" | Ryan | Stoupe the Enemy of Mankind | 2:34 |
| 5. | "Precision" | Ryan | 7L | 3:48 |
| 6. | "Word Association" | Ryan | 7L | 3:28 |
| 7. | "Stalker" | Ryan | 7L | 3:56 |
| 8. | "Speak Now" (featuring Apathy and Vinnie Paz) | Ryan; Chad Bromley; Vincenzo Luvineri | 7L | 4:35 |
| 9. | "Rules of Engagement" (featuring Count Bass D and J-Live) | Ryan; Dwight Farrell; Jean-Jacques Cadet | 7L | 2:58 |
| 10. | "Riccardi Man" | | Beyonder | 1:51 |
| 11. | "Herb" | Ryan | 7L | 3:07 |
| 12. | "What I Mean" (featuring Beyonder) | Ryan; Braun Dugan | Beyonder | 4:16 |
| 13. | "Rest In Peace" | Ryan; Kurt Matlin | KutMasta Kurt | 3:48 |
| 14. | "The Way Out" | Ryan | 7L | 2:41 |
| Total length: | | | | 46:04 |

== Personnel ==
- Seamus "Esoteric" Ryan – vocals, executive producer
- George "7L" Andrinopoulos – scratches, producer (tracks: 1–3, 5–9, 11, 14), executive producer
- Braun "Beyonder" Dugan – additional vocals (tracks: 3, 10, 12, 14), producer (tracks: 10, 12), recording & mixing (track 10)
- Chad "Apathy" Bromley – vocals (track 8)
- Vincenzo "Vinnie Paz" Luvineri – vocals (track 8)
- Dwight "Count Bass D" Farrell – vocals (track 9)
- Jean-Jacques "J-Live" Cadet – vocals (track 9)
- Kevin "Stoupe the Enemy of Mankind" Baldwin – producer (track 4)
- "KutMasta Kurt" Matlin – producer & mixing (track 13)
- Ray Fernandes – recording (tracks: 1, 3, 4, 11–13), mixing (tracks: 1, 3, 4, 11)
- Dan "D-Son" Nicklin – recording (tracks: 2, 5–9, 14), mixing (tracks: 2, 5–9, 12, 14)
- Michael Nickolas – sequencing, mastering
- Adam "Papa D!" Defalco – executive producer
- Truth Elemental – executive producer
- Trevor "Karma" Gendron – design
- El Holiday – photography
- GodSpeed – photography
