= Warm & Scratchy =

Compilation album by Various artists
- Released: May 21, 2007
- Genre: Electronic, Indie Rock, Art rock
- Label: Williams Street

Adult Swim Music chronology
Definitive Swim (2007)	Warm & Scratchy (2007)	Ghostly Swim (2008)

Warm & Scratchy is a free download album released in 2007 by Adult Swim (through Williams Street Records).

== Track listing ==
1. TV On The Radio – "Me-I" (3:16)
2. The Raveonettes – "Dead Sound" (2:57)
3. Les Savy Fav – "The Equestrian" (3:27)
4. The Rapture – "Crimson Red" (3:47)
5. 120 Days – "Justine" (2:21)
6. Broken Social Scene – "Canada vs. America" (6:09)
7. Sound Team – "Color Of The Love You Have" (4:03)
8. The Good, the Bad & the Queen – "The Bunting Song (Acoustic Version)" (4:02)
9. The Brother Kite – "Half Century" (4:04)
10. Jesu – "Silver (Original Beats)" (7:01)
11. Amusement Parks On Fire – "Back To Flash" (4:21)
12. Asobi Seksu – "Stay Awake" (5:32)
13. Fennesz – "Winter" (4:38)
14. Liars – "Sunset Rodeo" (4:12)
