= Garage Swim =

Compilation album
- Released: May 6, 2013
- Genre: Garage rock, indie rock, lo-fi
- Label: Williams Street

Adult Swim chronology
| Adult Swim Singles Program 2012 (2012) | Garage Swim (2013) | Adult Swim Singles Program 2013 (2013) |

Garage Swim is a garage rock compilation album released by Adult Swim in 2013. The album was released as a free download on their website. It was presented and sponsored by Dr. Pepper.

== Track listing ==
1. Bass Drum of Death – "Dregs" (3:09)
2. Apache Dropout – "Constant Plaything" (3:59)
3. Thee Oh Sees – "Devil Again" (2:48)
4. King Tuff feat. Gap Dream – "She's On Fire" (3:32)
5. JEFF the Brotherhood – "Melting Place" (3:16)
6. Black Lips – "Cruising" (2:41)
7. King Khan and Gris Gris – "Discrete Disguise" (4:17)
8. Mikal Cronin – "Better Man" (4:48)
9. Mind Spiders – "They Lie" (2:30)
10. Cheap Time – "Kill The Light" (3:05)
11. King Louie's Missing Monuments – "Covered In Ice" (3:05)
12. OBN Ills – "A Good Lover" (4:17)
13. The Gories – "On The Run" (2:09)
14. King Khan – "Strange Ways" (3:33)
15. Weekend – "Teal Kia" (Demo) (5:43)
