= Lost (Cool Calm Pete album) =

Studio album by Cool Calm Pete
- Released: July 12, 2005 (US); February 13, 2006 (Europe)
- Genre: Hip-hop
- Length: 59:06
- Label: Embedded Records (US); Definitive Jux (Europe)
- Producer: Cool Calm Pete, Ed Live, Doc Strange, Snafu, DJ Pre

Professional ratings
Review scores
Source	Rating
AllHipHop	3.5/5
AllMusic	4/5 stars
RapReviews.com	8/10

Lost is the first solo album by American hip-hop artist Cool Calm Pete. Originally released in the United States via Embedded Records in 2005, it was re-released with additional bonus tracks in Europe via Definitive Jux in 2006.

== Reception ==
Stewart Mason of AllMusic gave the album 4 stars out of 5, calling it "a trippy blend of incredibly obscure samples, found dialogue, loosey-goosey beats that never break a sweat, and often-amusing lyrics delivered in an offhand style somewhere between Kanye West's peculiarly off-kilter rhythms and Mike Skinner's conversational casualness."

== Track listing ==
No.	Title	Producer(s)	Length
1.	"Intro"	Cool Calm Pete	2:29
2.	"Lost"	Cool Calm Pete	4:12
3.	"The List"	Cool Calm Pete	3:26
4.	"Cloudy"	Ed Live	3:13
5.	"Wind Sprints"	Cool Calm Pete, Doc Strange	4:11
6.	"Cool Calm Science"	Snafu	3:47
7.	"F#$%@#$%ck Yoooouuuu." (featuring Lathia Black and Thirstin Howl III)	Doc Strange	4:21
8.	"Two A.M."	Cool Calm Pete	3:05
9.	"New Jack Biddle" (featuring Jaymanila and Jungle Mike)	Cool Calm Pete, DJ Pre	3:38
10.	"Tune In"	Cool Calm Pete	3:35
11.	"Lost Interlude"	Cool Calm Pete	1:59
12.	"Dinner and a Movie"	Cool Calm Pete, DJ Pre	5:28
13.	"Brush P.S.A." (featuring Jungle Mike)	Cool Calm Pete	2:38
14.	"Wishes and Luck"	Ed Live	6:01
15.	"Wait" (Europe edition bonus track)	DJ Pre	3:02
16.	"Lost (Blockhead Remix)" (Europe edition bonus track)	Blockhead	3:35
17.	"Black Friday" (Europe edition bonus track)	RJD2	3:53
