= Emergency Rations (EP) =

EP by Mr. Lif
- Released: June 25, 2002
- Studios: Bandulero Sound, Berlin; Boston Butta Beats, Boston; The Pool Room, New York City
- Genre: Hip-hop
- Length: 28:18
- Label: Definitive Jux
- Producers: Mr. Lif; Edan; DJ Hype; DJ Fakts One; El-P

Mr. Lif chronology
Enters the Colossus (2000)	Emergency Rations (2002)	I Phantom (2002)

Emergency Rations is the second EP by American rapper Mr. Lif, released on June 25, 2002, by Definitive Jux. It was recorded at Bandulero Sound in Berlin, Boston Butta Beats in Boston, and The Pool Room in New York City.

The song "Phantom" was featured on the soundtrack to the 2003 video game Tony Hawk's Underground.

== Music and lyrics ==
Emergency Rations is a concept album whose premise centers around Mr. Lif's fictional kidnapping presumably by government agents. It showcases his defiant perspective on themes such as civil rights, censorship, and U.S. foreign policy. He also raps about societal ills such as gender socialization, the vapid state of pop culture, and the dehumanizing effects of capitalism. Lif's thoughtful, confrontational lyrics are backed by Akrobatik and El-P's dissonant production, which evokes feelings of paranoia and alienation.

== Critical reception ==
Professional ratings
Review scores
Source	Rating
AllMusic	4/5 stars
Muzik	4/5 stars
Pitchfork	7.3/10
The Village Voice	A−

Emergency Rations received positive reviews from critics. In The A.V. Club, Nathan Rabin highlighted the EP's "solid blast of social consciousness" and wrote that it possessed "a raw, unfinished quality that more than lives up to the urgency of its title". AllMusic's Martin Woodside called Lif "a thoughtful, often incendiary lyricist", while calling Emergency Rations "a provocative, well-crafted album that proves hard to ignore." Robert Christgau from The Village Voice found Mr. Lif "funny" and an "angry guy". According to him, Lif used the EP as both a set up for his subsequent concept album, I Phantom (2002), and as "an excuse to drop random science about the place of hip hop in the military-industrial complex."

== Track listing ==
No.	Title	Producer(s)	Length
1.	"Intro (Missing Person's File)" (featuring Akrobatik and Brotha PC)		2:22
2.	"Jugular Vein"	Mr. Lif	3:19
3.	"Heavy Artillery"	Edan	3:41
4.	"Home of the Brave"	Mr. Lif	3:46
5.	"Pull Out Your Cut"	DJ Hype	3:30
6.	"Get Wise '91" (featuring Edan)	Edan	3:21
7.	"The Unorthodox"	DJ Fakts One	4:00
8.	"Phantom" (featuring El-P)	El-P	4:18

== Personnel ==
Credits adapted from liner notes.

- Akrobatik – vocals
- Keith Atkins – engineering
- DJ Hype – cut, production
- Edan – production
- El-P – production, vocals
- Fakts One – cut, production, vocals
- Ray Boy Fernandes – engineering, mixing
- Marc Johnson – engineering
- Dan Ezra Lang – art direction, design, illustrations
- Mr. Lif – primary artist, production
- Nasa – engineering, mixing
- Ghazi Shami – development

== Charts ==
Chart (2002)	Peak position
US Heatseekers Albums (Billboard)	38
US Independent Albums (Billboard)	28
