= Sweep the Leg =

Studio album by Hangar 18
- Released: October 23, 2007
- Genre: Hip hop
- Length: 50:13
- Label: Definitive Jux
- Producer: DJ Pawl, Blockhead

Hangar 18 chronology
The Multi-Platinum Debut Album (2004)	Sweep the Leg (2007)

Professional ratings
Review scores
Source	Rating
AllHipHop	favorable
AllMusic	3.5/5 stars
Exclaim!	favorable
Pitchfork	5.7/10
XLR8R	4/10

Sweep the Leg is the second and final studio album by American hip hop music group Hangar 18. It was released on Definitive Jux on October 23, 2007. "Dance with Me" features a vocal contribution from Slug of Atmosphere.

== Critical reception ==
Marisa Brown of AllMusic gave the album 3.5 stars out of 5, commenting that "Hangar 18's two MCs, Alaska and Windnbreeze, both have good, clean flows, and even though they don't move much from the quick triplet delivery they're most comfortable with, their verses never end up sounding monotonous or predictable." Neil Acharya of Exclaim! said, "the appreciation of this album can vary widely for those that place a high value on lyrical content."

Meanwhile, Sam Chennault of Pitchfork gave the album a 5.7 out of 10, saying, "It's clear that, individually, Alaska and Windbreeze are talented, and it's tempting to be impressed by the sheer quantity of lyrics here, but their voices are too smooth, bereft of the gruff crevices or the aching cracks that reveal personality."

== Track listing ==
No.	Title	Producer(s)	Length
1.	"Highly Anticipated"	DJ Pawl	2:10
2.	"Watchyoself"	DJ Pawl	3:51
3.	"The West Wing"	Blockhead	4:15
4.	"...That I Know What I Want"	DJ Pawl	2:46
5.	"Jump Muthafuh"	DJ Pawl	4:21
6.	"Sad"	DJ Pawl	5:27
7.	"Feet to Feet"	DJ Pawl	4:59
8.	"Really Wide"	DJ Pawl	4:01
9.	"Bakin Soda"	DJ Pawl	2:24
10.	"Dance with Me" (featuring Slug)	DJ Pawl	4:35
11.	"Room to Breathe"	Blockhead	4:15
12.	"Think Big"	DJ Pawl	3:37
13.	"Last Stop"	DJ Pawl	3:32
