= Let's Get Serious (Party Fun Action Committee album) =

Studio album by Party Fun Action Committee
- Released: July 1, 2003
- Genre: Hip hop
- Length: 44:25
- Label: Definitive Jux
- Producer: Blockhead; Jer

Singles from Let's Get Serious
- 1. "Beer" Released: 2003

Let's Get Serious is the first studio album by American hip hop group Party Fun Action Committee. It was released on Definitive Jux on July 1, 2003. The concept album documents a day in the life of two record label executives played by Blockhead and Jeremy Gibson listening to a collection of demo tapes.

== Critical reception ==
Professional ratings
Review scores
Source	Rating
AllMusic	4/5 stars
The A.V. Club	favorable
Stylus Magazine	favorable

Johnny Loftus of AllMusic gave the album 4 out of 5 stars, stating that "while the raps throughout are often impressive (if a little sophomoric), it's the beats PFAC has come up with that really sell Let's Get Serious' book of inside jokes." Nathan Rabin of The A.V. Club commented that "Let's Get Serious recalls The Turtles Present the Battle of the Bands". He added, "PFAC's uneven but inspired Let's Get Serious is silly, self-indulgent, and sophomoric, and a whole lot of fun to boot". Jeff Weiss of Stylus Magazine said: "From the ad-libs of each faux-artist to the small jabs at the record executives' dietary habits and decorating tastes, the album plays out like a hip-hop version of This Is Spinal Tap".

Los Angeles Times named the album one of the most seminal releases from Definitive Jux, calling it "the gold standard of comedy rap records".

== Track listing ==
No.	Title	Length
1.	"Intro"	2:20
2.	"Mental Storm"	2:22
3.	"Whatchu Know Now"	4:14
4.	"Be My Lady Intro"	0:44
5.	"Be My Lady"	1:55
6.	"I Shoulda Known"	5:08
7.	"Word Up? Intro"	1:13
8.	"Word Up?"	1:55
9.	"Beer"	5:17
10.	"Chapstick Intro"	1:03
11.	"Chapstick"	2:12
12.	"I Am..."	5:19
13.	"Peter Pan Intro"	0:39
14.	"Peter Pan"	3:27
15.	"Back n da Daiz"	4:18
16.	"Outro / Here Comes the Rock"	2:19
