= I Heard It Today =

Studio album by Mr. Lif
- Released: April 21, 2009
- Genre: Hip-hop
- Length: 39:25
- Label: Bloodbot Tactical Enterprises
- Producers: Batsauce, Edan, Cut Chemist, Ray Fernandes, Decaye, J-Zone, Therapy, Nik Jhatakia, Mr. Lif, Willie Evans Jr., Headnodic

Mr. Lif chronology
Mo' Mega (2006)	I Heard It Today (2009)	Don't Look Down (2016)

I Heard It Today is the third solo studio album by American hip-hop artist Mr. Lif. It was released by Bloodbot Tactical Enterprises on April 21, 2009. Written at "the dawn of the Obama administration", the album is "dedicated to capturing the pulse of a tumultuous era in the United States."

== Critical reception ==
Professional ratings
Aggregate scores
Source	Rating
Metacritic	70/100
Review scores
Source	Rating
AllMusic	favorable
The A.V. Club	B−
BBC	favorable
The Boston Globe	favorable
Exclaim!	favorable
The Guardian	4/5 stars
Pitchfork	5.3/10
PopMatters	6/10 stars
Spin	favorable
XLR8R	8.5/10

At Metacritic, which assigns a weighted average score out of 100 to reviews from mainstream critics, the album received an average score of 70, based on 11 reviews, indicating "generally favorable reviews".

Max Herman of XLR8R gave the album an 8.5 out of 10, commenting that "taking a break from working with El-P actually benefits him, as the melodic beats crafted by producers like J-Zone, Edan, and Headnodic are the perfect pairing for Lif's selfless lyricism." Andrew Martin of PopMatters gave the album 6 stars out of 10, calling it "one of Lif's most concise and well-rounded efforts." David Aaron of BBC wrote, "it's comforting to know there are still hip hop acts out there trying to give a voice to the voiceless."

== Track listing ==
No.	Title	Producer(s)	Length
1.	"Welcome to the World"	Batsauce	2:45
2.	"What About Us?"	Batsauce	2:59
3.	"Breathe" (featuring Bahamadia)	Batsauce	2:44
4.	"Collapse the Walls"	Edan, Cut Chemist	3:06
5.	"Folklore" (featuring Dumbtron and Vinnie Paz)	Batsauce	3:23
6.	"Police Brutality (Scene)"	Ray Fernandes, Decaye	0:46
7.	"Gun Fight" (featuring Metro)	J-Zone	3:15
8.	"PNN 1"	Therapy, Nik Jhatakia	1:11
9.	"Hatred"	Mr. Lif	3:22
10.	"Homecoming (Scene)"	Mr. Lif	0:23
11.	"Head High"	Therapy	4:27
12.	"I Heard It Today"	Willie Evans Jr.	3:38
13.	"The Sun"	Headnodic	3:40
14.	"Dawn"	Willie Evans Jr.	3:46

Bandcamp edition bonus track
No.	Title	Length
15.	"Obama"	4:00

iTunes edition bonus track
No.	Title	Length
15.	"The Gauntlet"	3:42
