= ATL RMX =

Remix album by Adult Swim Music
- Released: December 7, 2009
- Genres: Hip hop, Electronic
- Label: Williams Street

Adult Swim Music chronology
African Swim (2008)	ATL RMX (2009)	Adult Swim Singles Program 2010 (2010)

ATL RMX is a free download album released in 2009 by Adult Swim (through Williams Street Records). It is presented by Rockstar Games' Beaterator. The track listing contains remixes of songs by many mainstream hip hop artists, all of whom are based out of Atlanta, Georgia (the home of Adult Swim).

== Track listing ==
1. Young Jeezy – "I Got This" (El-P remix)
2. Rich Kids – "Patna Dem" (Mad Decent Patna's remix by DJA)
3. Dem Getaway Boyz – "Imma G" (Memory Tapes remix)
4. Goodie Mob – "Is That You God?" (Dabrye remix)
5. Young Dro – "Take Off" (Michna remix)
6. Cee-Lo and the Good Time Guys – "Hello Miss" (Armani XXXChange remix)
7. Lil Jon feat. Kee – "Give It All You Got" (Danger Beach remix)
8. Gucci Mane – "Photoshoot" (Flying Lotus remix)
9. Gorilla Zoe – "Lost" (Starkey remix)
10. Shawty Lo – "Dey Know" (Prefuse 73 remix)
11. Kollosus – "Breakin' Bread" (Phaseone remix)
12. Pill – "Lookin'" (Chris Devoe remix)
13. B.o.B – "Satellite" (Hudson Mohawke remix)
14. Playboy Tre – "Sideways" (Salem Drag Chop remix)
15. OJ Da Juiceman feat. Gucci Mane – "Good Night" (Health remix)
16. Lil Jon feat. Kee – "Give It All You Got" (Drums of Death remix)
17. Hollyweerd – "Have You Ever Made Love to a Weerdo?" (Dam-Funk Remix)
