= Fantastic Damage =

Studio album by El-P
- Released: May 14, 2002
- Recorded: 2000–2001
- Genre: Underground hip-hop, experimental hip-hop
- Length: 70:18
- Label: Definitive Jux
- Producer: El-P

El-P chronology
El-P Presents Cannibal Oxtrumentals (2002)	Fantastic Damage (2002)	High Water (2004)

Singles from Fantastic Damage
- 1. "Stepfather Factory" Released: 2001; 2. "Deep Space 9mm" Released: 2002; 3. "Truancy (with Rob Sonic)" Released: 2002; 4. "Dead Disnee" Released: 2002

Fantastic Damage is the debut solo studio album by American hip hop artist El-P. It was released through Definitive Jux on May 14, 2002. It peaked at number 198 on the Billboard 200 chart. Music videos were created for "Stepfather Factory" and "Deep Space 9mm".

Fandam Plus: Instrumentals, Remixes, Lyrics & Video was released through Definitive Jux on October 1, 2002.

== Production ==
The majority of Fantastic Damage was made after the breakup of El-P's previous group Company Flow. El-P recorded the album in his bedroom in Brooklyn using turntables, an Ensoniq EPS-16 Plus sampler, a Kaoss Pad and an Oberheim OB12 synthesizer. According to El-P, he primarily used a DA-88 and "barely touched ProTools". It took over a year and a half to record the album.

Public Enemy was a big influence on El-P's production style on the album. The album contains references to Philip K. Dick and George Orwell, who El-P credits as influences on his worldview and lyrics.

== Critical reception ==
Professional ratings
Review scores
Source	Rating
AllMusic	4.5/5 stars
Entertainment Weekly	A
NME	8/10
Pitchfork	8.9/10
Rolling Stone	3.5/5 stars
Spin	9/10
Stylus Magazine	A
Tiny Mix Tapes	5/5

Steve Huey of AllMusic wrote, "Fantastic Damage constitutes some of the most challenging, lyrically dense hip-hop around, assembled by one of the genre's true independent mavericks." Kathryn McGuire of Rolling Stone called it "a heavy, turbulent affair".

Pitchfork placed Fantastic Damage at number 11 on its list of the top albums of 2002, while Spin placed it at number 27 on its list of the year's best albums. In 2015, Fact placed it at number 21 on its "100 Best Indie Hip-Hop Records of All Time" list.

Although interpreted as a "post-9/11 record" which channeled the feelings of New Yorkers and Americans after the September 11 attacks, the album was written and largely recorded before September 11, 2001.

== Track listing ==
No.	Title	Length
1.	"Fantastic Damage"	3:22
2.	"Squeegee Man Shooting"	4:24
3.	"Deep Space 9mm"	3:47
4.	"Tuned Mass Damper"	4:05
5.	"Dead Disnee"	3:53
6.	"Delorean" (with Aesop Rock and Ill Bill)	5:33
7.	"Truancy" (with Rob Sonic)	5:04
8.	"The Nang, the Front, the Bush and the Shit" (with Vast Aire)	5:37
9.	"Accidents Don't Happen" (with Cage and Camu Tao)	4:50
10.	"Stepfather Factory"	4:11
11.	"T.O.J."	4:32
12.	"Dr. Hellno and the Praying Mantus" (with Vast Aire)	4:39
13.	"Lazerfaces' Warning"	4:36
14.	"Innocent Leader"	2:21
15.	"Constellation Funk" (with Nasa)	4:58
16.	"Blood" (with C-Rayz Walz and Mr. Lif)	4:26

== Personnel ==
Credits adapted from liner notes.

- El-P – vocals, production, recording, mixing, art direction
- Aesop Rock – vocals (6)
- Ill Bill – vocals (6)
- Rob Sonic – vocals (7)
- Vast Aire – vocals (8, 12)
- Cage – vocals (9)
- Camu Tao – vocals (9)
- Nasa – vocals (15), recording, mixing
- C-Rayz Walz – vocals (16)
- Mr. Lif – vocals (16)
- DJ Abilities – turntables
- Dan Ezra Lang – art direction, design, painting
- Alexander Calder – painting
- Phase Two – painting

== Charts ==
Chart (2002)	Peak position
US Billboard 200	198
US Heatseekers Albums (Billboard)	9
US Independent Albums (Billboard)	14
US Top R&B/Hip-Hop Albums (Billboard)	82
