= I Phantom =

Album by Mr. Lif

Studio album by Mr. Lif
- Released: September 17, 2002
- Studios: Boston Butta Beats in Boston; Def Jux Studios, Steel Acres, and The Danger Room in New York
- Genres: Hip-hop, underground hip-hop
- Length: 47:23
- Label: Definitive Jux
- Producers: El-P; Insight; DJ Fakts One; Nasa; Edan

Mr. Lif chronology
| Emergency Rations (2002) | I Phantom (2002) | Mo' Mega (2006) |

I Phantom is the debut studio album by American rapper Mr. Lif. It was produced mostly by alternative hip-hop artist El-P, among others, at Boston Butta Beats in Boston and the New York City-based Steel Acres, The Danger Room, and Def Jux Studios. Mr. Lif composed I Phantom as a concept album about the working life of an African American who is pressured into pursuing the dubious rewards of the American dream.

The album was released on September 16, 2002, by Definitive Jux. A widespread critical success, it was acclaimed for El-P's sparse hip-hop production and Lif's incisive, everyman lyrics.

== Music and lyrics ==
To see conscious rap disappear to the point where people are almost shocked that I could make such a record is disappointing. How did we get lulled to sleep like this?

— Mr. Lif, Jockey Slut

I Phantom is a concept album described as "an exploration of the dynamics of everyday life, and the pursuit of our dreams, in a rapidly decaying society." The narrative begins with death ("A Glimpse at the Struggle") and resurrection ("Return of the B-Boy") and ends with nuclear holocaust ("Earthcrusher", "Post-Mortem"). The liner notes provide instructions on how the story should be followed. Mr. Lif recorded the album at Boston Butta Beats in Boston and the New York City studios Steel Acres, The Danger Room, and Def Jux Studios, in the same sessions that produced his debut extended play Emergency Rations (2002). The album features beats made by alternative hip-hop producers such as Edan, DJ Fakts One, and El-P, as well as guest raps performed by Aesop Rock, Jean Grae, and Akrobatik.

I Phantom expands on the everyman persona that he debuted on Emergency Rations, of which he said in an interview for the Chicago Tribune: "We're wasting time if we're not talking about issues that affect us and the planet in our music. I grew up in an era when Boogie Down Productions, Public Enemy and Eric B. and Rakim were dropping serious science on their records. They didn't ignore what was going on around them at the time, and neither should we. We're talking with each other through this music." While his debut EP was an intensely political diatribe on U.S. foreign policy and the Bush administration, I Phantom focuses more on working class black America.

== Release and reception ==
Professional ratings
Aggregate scores
| Source | Rating |
|---|---|
| Metacritic | 81/100 |
Review scores
| Source | Rating |
| AllMusic | 4/5 stars |
| Alternative Press | 7/10 |
| Blender | 4/5 stars |
| Encyclopedia of Popular Music | 4/5 stars |
| NME | 7/10 |
| Pitchfork | 8.3/10 |
| Rolling Stone | 3/5 stars |
| Uncut | 4/5 stars |
| Vibe | 4/5 |
| The Village Voice | A |

I Phantom was released by Definitive Jux on September 16, 2002, in the United Kingdom and on September 17 in the United States, where Mr. Lif had begun a national tour on September 14 to promote the record.

I Phantom received widespread acclaim from critics. At Metacritic, which assigns a normalized rating out of 100 to reviews from mainstream publications, the album received an average score of 81, based on 12 reviews. Moira McCormick of the Chicago Tribune called it "a heady, lyrically dazzling, unsparing" hip-hop concept album told "with humor, heart and a sorcerer's way with words", while Blender deemed the record's funk-influenced beats "innovative" and Lif's rhymes "engaging ... [He] brilliantly avoids the pitfalls of vacuous bling-drones and 'real hip-hop' whiners alike." In The A.V. Club, Nathan Rabin called it "really audacious and ambitious", writing that it mixes El-P's "icy B-boy futurism with Lif's nasal-everyman flow, to powerful effect." Village Voice critic Robert Christgau said I Phantom showed an ambitious concept, specific insight into life working and raising a family, and a critique comparable to Boots Riley. He said the "musically pleasurable" album "fleshes out its cohesive narrative and cogent ideas with beats that respect the spare antipop ethos without abjuring such wayward rhythm elements as femme chorus, bass-drum-whoop jam, and $20 synth loop".

For the annual Pazz & Jop critics poll, Christgau voted I Phantom as the 15th best album of 2002. Kludge ranked it at number seven on the magazine's list of the year's 100 best records.

== Track listing ==
| No. | Title | Producer | Length |
|---|---|---|---|
| 1. | "Bad Card" | Nasa | 2:09 |
| 2. | "A Glimpse at the Struggle" | El-P | 3:28 |
| 3. | "Return of the B-Boy" | El-P | 7:35 |
| 4. | "Live from the Plantation" | Edan | 3:58 |
| 5. | "New Man Theme" | DJ Fakts One | 3:23 |
| 6. | "Handouts" | Insight | 0:40 |
| 7. | "Status" (featuring Insight) | Insight | 4:00 |
| 8. | "Success" (featuring Aesop Rock) | El-P | 4:16 |
| 9. | "Daddy Dearest" | El-P | 0:57 |
| 10. | "The Now" | El-P | 3:48 |
| 11. | "Friends and Neighbors" | DJ Fakts One | 2:34 |
| 12. | "Iron Helix" (featuring Insight) | Insight | 2:41 |
| 13. | "Earthcrusher" | Insight | 3:46 |
| 14. | "Post Mortem" (featuring El-P, Jean Grae and Akrobatik) | El-P | 4:01 |

== Personnel ==
Credits adapted from the album's liner notes.

- Aesop Rock – vocals
- Akrobatik – vocals
- Keith Atkins – engineering, mixing
- Edan – production
- El-P – engineering, executive producer, mixing, production, vocals
- Fakts One – mixing, production, vocals
- Ray Boy Fernandes – engineer, mixing, vocals
- Jean Grae – vocals
- Insight – featured artist, production
- Dan Ezra Lang – art direction, design
- Emily Lazar – mastering
- Mr. Lif – primary artist
- Nasa – engineering, mixing, production, vocals
- Amaechi Uzoigwe – vocals
- Vast Aire – vocals

== Charts ==
| Chart (2002) | Peak position |
|---|---|
| US Heatseekers Albums (Billboard) | 20 |
| US Independent Albums (Billboard) | 16 |
| US Top R&B/Hip-Hop Albums (Billboard) | 80 |

== See also ==
- Political hip-hop
