= Cool Calm Pete =

American rapper (born 1979)

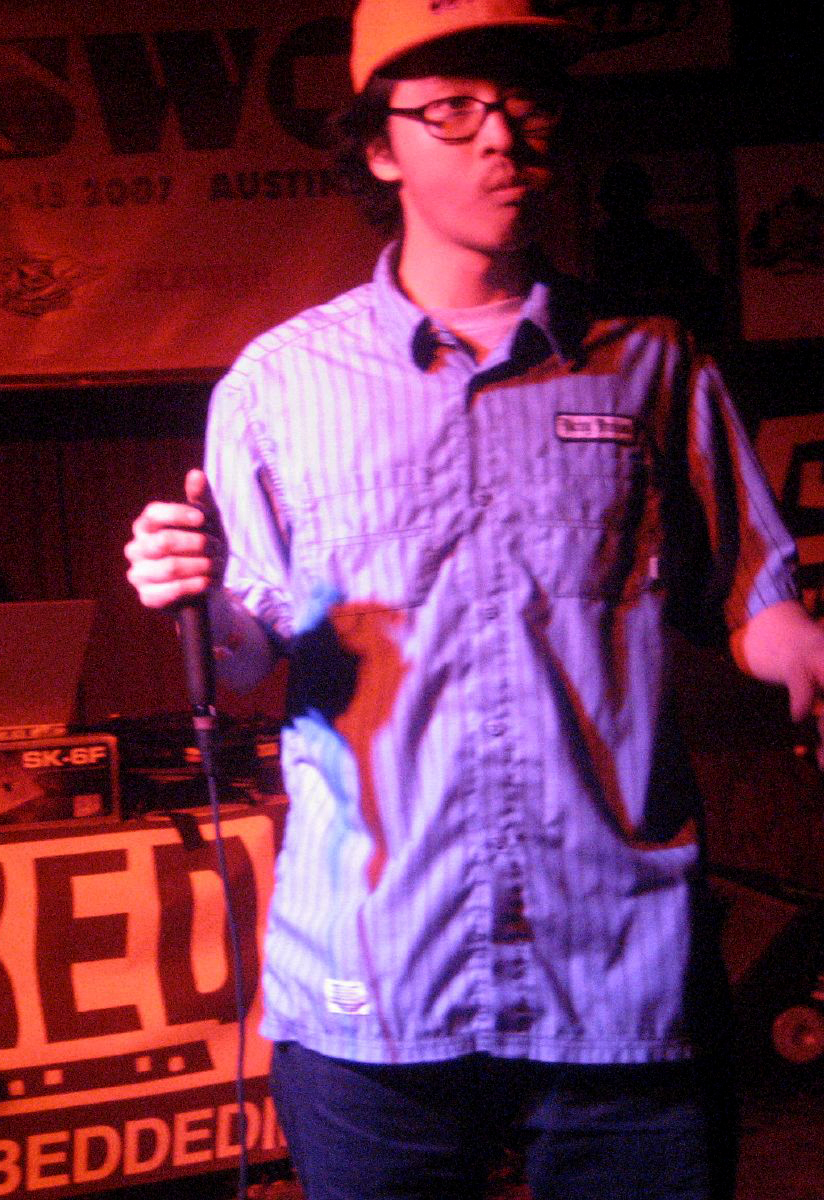

Background information
- Born: Peter Chung
- Origin: Seoul, South Korea
- Genres: Hip-hop; alternative hip-hop
- Occupations: Rapper; producer
- Labels: Embedded Music; Definitive Jux

Peter Chung (born March 25, 1979), better known by his stage name Cool Calm Pete, is a Korean American rapper and producer from Seoul, who is currently based in Queens, New York. He has been profiled in major publications such as URB and XXL. He is a founding member of the hip-hop trio Babbletron.

== Life and career ==
Chung was born in Seoul, South Korea and moved to Queens, New York by the time he was a toddler. He attended Cooper Union and received his BFA in fine arts, focusing on painting. Chung is one of the three members of the hip-hop group Babbletron, alongside DJ Pre and Jaymanila, whose work featured production from RJD2 and MF Doom, among others. Cool Calm Pete's debut solo album Lost was released in the United States on Embedded Music, and released in Europe on Definitive Jux. He has since released a 9-track EP entitled Loosies, featuring several remixes of his older work. Pete currently works in graphic design.

=== Unfinished Discography ===
In several interviews with undergroundhiphop.com dating back to 2007, Chung stated he was working on an album planned to release the following year titled "Leonard Z" concerned with exploring the human condition, which was never released. Leonard Z is referenced by Chung at the very end of "Words From the Pedro", a feature he did on Junk Science's album "Gran'dad's Nerve Tonic" released in 2007. The lyric arrives at the very end of the track, "Leonard Z's getting tipsy".

In 2012, a Tumblr account named @nervousromance posted a video of a puppet voiced by Chung rapping about Cool Calm Pete, followed by a fade to black with the words "Nervous Romance" remaining. Some of the lines spoken include "Let me tell you 'bout this Korean dude who loves drugs and gots that attitude / His nickname is CCP and he's fly, I'm talking OG". It is likely this was a teaser for a song or album that was never released.

== Personal life ==
According to Sophia Chang, an illustrator and designer that interned for Cool Calm Pete, said "He actually hates the spotlight. I think that's extremely respectful."

== Style ==
Cool Calm Pete is known for his distinct rapping style. He has been described for having a certain smooth and relaxed-sounding rapping style.

== Discography ==
=== Albums ===
- Mechanical Royalty (Embedded Music - 2003) with Jaymanila and DJ Pre as Babbletron
- Lost (Embedded Music - 2005)
- demolition (bubble wife records - 2025)

=== Mixtapes ===
- The Food Theme (Theme Magazine - 2009)
- Over You (Modern Shark - 2010)
- The Ups & Downs (Modern Shark - 2011)
- Triangle Offense (2015)
- Calling Back From Cali (2019)

=== Singles and EPs ===
- "Black Friday" (Definitive Jux - 2002)
- "Lost the Single" (Embedded Music - 2005)
- Loosies - Remixes and Other Oddities (Definitive Jux - 2007)
- "Gitty Up Baby" (Definitive Jux - 2007)
- "Get with the Times" (Definitive Jux - 2007)
- "Heart" (Definitive Jux - 2009)
- "Offline" (Modern Shark - 2011)
- "These Daze" (bubble wife records - 2022)

=== Reissues ===
- LOST (Director's Cut) (bubble wife records - 2023)
