= Black Dialogue =

Studio album by the Perceptionists
- Released: March 22, 2005
- Genre: Hip-hop
- Length: 41:19
- Label: Definitive Jux
- Producers: DJ Fakts One; El-P; Cyrus the Great; Willie Evans Jr.; Camu Tao

The Perceptionists chronology
Black Dialogue (2005)	Resolution (2017)

Singles from Black Dialogue
- 1. "Memorial Day" Released: 2004; 2. "Blo" Released: 2005; 3. "Black Dialogue" Released: 2005

Black Dialogue is the debut studio album by American hip-hop group the Perceptionists. It was released on Definitive Jux on March 22, 2005.

== Critical reception ==
Professional ratings
Aggregate scores
Source	Rating
Metacritic	81/100
Review scores
Source	Rating
AllMusic	4/5 stars
The A.V. Club	mixed
Billboard	favorable
City Pages	favorable
Entertainment Weekly	B+
Exclaim!	favorable
PopMatters	8/10 stars
XLR8R	favorable

At Metacritic, which assigns a weighted average score out of 100 to reviews from mainstream critics, Black Dialogue received an average score of 81, based on 7 reviews, indicating "universal acclaim".

Andy Kellman of AllMusic gave the album 4 out of 5 stars, saying, "Lif and Akrobatik have a long history, so they sound natural as brainy verse-swapping partners, and they're sharp throughout, whether they have their sights set on the Bush Administration or are simply batting boasts back and forth." Nathan Rabin of The A.V. Club said, "on the whole, Black Dialogue emerges as a triumph, an impassioned 12-track hip-hop manifesto even a mother could love, assuming of course, she hasn't affixed a Bush/Cheney sticker on the bumper of the family station wagon."

Dylan Hicks of City Pages called it "a leftist party record: alarmed but not paranoid, disgusted but not defeated, convinced that radicals are born on the dance floor and thus never guilty about composing love raps and having a good time." Derek Beres of XLR8R said: "Social theory and musical aesthetic find kindred partnership on Black Dialogue."

Rolling Stone placed it at number 36 on the "Top 50 Records of 2005" list.

== Track listing ==
No.	Title	Producer(s)	Length
1.	"Let's Move"	DJ Fakts One	2:59
2.	"People 4 Prez"	El-P	2:21
3.	"Blo"	El-P	3:22
4.	"Memorial Day"	Cyrus the Great	3:33
5.	"Love Letters"	Willie Evans Jr.	4:11
6.	"Black Dialogue"	Willie Evans Jr.	3:06
7.	"Frame Rupture"	El-P	3:22
8.	"What Have We Got to Lose?!?"	Cyrus the Great	2:46
9.	"Party Hard" (featuring Camu Tao and Guru)	Camu Tao	3:50
10.	"Career Finders" (featuring Humpty Hump)	DJ Fakts One	3:45
11.	"5 O'Clock" (featuring Phonte)	DJ Fakts One	4:05
12.	"Breathe in the Sun"	Willie Evans Jr.	3:58
Total length:			41:19

== In other media ==
A few of their songs from the album even appeared in several video games, mostly by Electronic Arts. "Let's Move" appeared in NBA Live 06 and Need For Speed: Most Wanted, while "People for Prez" appeared in SSX On Tour. "Party Hard" appeared in ATV Offroad Fury 4, DJ Hero 2 (as DLC), and Skate 3.

== Charts ==
Chart	Peak position
US Heatseekers Albums (Billboard)	41
US Independent Albums (Billboard)	42
