= Mo' Mega =

Studio album by Mr. Lif
- Released: June 13, 2006
- Genre: Hip-hop
- Length: 40:42
- Label: Definitive Jux
- Producers: El-P, Mr. Lif, Edan, Nick Toth

Mr. Lif chronology
| I Phantom (2002) | Mo' Mega (2006) | I Heard It Today (2009) |

Singles from Mo' Mega
- 1. "Brothaz" Released: 2006; 2. "The Fries" Released: 2006

Mo' Mega is the second solo studio album by American hip-hop artist Mr. Lif. It was released by Definitive Jux on June 13, 2006. It peaked at number 27 on the Billboard Heatseekers Albums chart, as well as number 31 on the Independent Albums chart.

== Title ==
In the album's liner notes, Mr. Lif wrote:

Mo' represents the dialect of the Black slave in America. Mega represents the hyper-modernized world we live in. As the cost of living increases at an exponential rate, more of us are finding it difficult to keep pace. I feel that the term Mo' extends beyond race to describe the masses whom have not achieved elite levels of wealth. Mo' Mega is the juxtaposition of the slave and the elite with no common ground between the two.

== Critical reception ==
Professional ratings
Aggregate scores
| Source | Rating |
|---|---|
| Metacritic | 75/100 |
Review scores
| Source | Rating |
| AllMusic | 3.5/5 stars |
| The A.V. Club | A− |
| Entertainment Weekly | B+ |
| HipHopDX | 4.0/5 |
| IGN | 8.3/10 |
| Pitchfork | 7.9/10 |
| PopMatters | 6/10 stars |
| Slant Magazine | 3.5/5 stars |
| Stylus Magazine | B− |
| XLR8R | favorable |

At Metacritic, which assigns a weighted average score out of 100 to reviews from mainstream critics, the album received an average score of 75, based on 22 reviews, indicating "generally favorable reviews".

John Bush of AllMusic wrote: "With political tracks and comedy and confessionals, Lif easily covers more ground than virtually any other rapper on record, and he makes his tracks entertaining, but he occasionally falls prey to a common trap -- educating the listeners but not enlightening them."

== Track listing ==
| No. | Title | Producer(s) | Length |
|---|---|---|---|
| 1. | "Collapse" | El-P | 2:32 |
| 2. | "Ultra Mega" | El-P | 2:36 |
| 3. | "Brothaz" | El-P | 4:28 |
| 4. | "The Fries" | El-P | 3:38 |
| 5. | "Take, Hold, Fire!" (featuring Aesop Rock and El-P) | El-P | 3:40 |
| 6. | "Murs Iz My Manager" (featuring Murs) | Mr. Lif, Edan | 4:19 |
| 7. | "Washitup!" | Mr. Lif | 2:56 |
| 8. | "Long Distance" | El-P | 4:04 |
| 9. | "Mo' Mega" (featuring Blueprint and Akrobatik) | El-P | 4:15 |
| 10. | "Lookin' In..." | El-P | 2:47 |
| 11. | "For You" | Nick Toth | 5:27 |

== Personnel ==
Credits adapted from liner notes.

- Mr. Lif – vocals, production (6, 7)
- El-P – production (1, 2, 3, 4, 5, 8, 9, 10), vocals (5), additional vocals (9)
- DJ Relm – turntables (2, 4)
- Aesop Rock – vocals (5)
- Murs – vocals (6)
- Edan – co-production (6)
- Blueprint – vocals (9)
- Akrobatik – vocals (9)
- DJ Big Wiz – turntables (9)
- Nick Toth – production (11)
- Michelle Shaprow – additional vocals (11)

== Charts ==
| Chart (2006) | Peak position |
|---|---|
| US Heatseekers Albums (Billboard) | 27 |
| US Independent Albums (Billboard) | 31 |
