= The Weathermen (hip-hop group) =

American hip hop production group

- The Weathermen logo.

Background information
- Origin: Middletown, New York
- Genres: Hip hop
- Years active: 1998–2010
- Label: Eastern Conference Records
- Past members: Aesop Rock; Breeze Brewin; Cage; El-P; Tame One; Yak Ballz; Camu Tao; Copywrite; Jakki Tha Motamouth; Masai Bey; Vast Aire; Metro; Tage Future

The Weathermen was an American hip hop production group, formed in 1998 in Middletown, New York, composed of East Coast rappers and producers Cage Kennylz and Masai Bey, until further expanded into a rap group, and included; Aesop Rock, Tame One, Yak Ballz, El-P, Jakki Tha Motamouth, Camu Tao, Copywrite, Vast Aire, and Breeze Brewin. The group took its name from the revolutionary organization Weather Underground (who were originally called The Weathermen), and its debut album was to be called The New Left.

== History ==
American rapper Cage formed The Weathermen, a hip hop collective alongside Camu Tao, El-P, Copywrite, Yak Ballz, Tame One, Breeze Brewin, Jakki tha Motamouth and Vast Aire. The Weathermen released a mixtape in 2003 titled The Conspiracy, on Eastern Conference Records. The Conspiracy was to be the last work Cage would record for Eastern Conference, leaving the label over alleged non-payment. In the summer of 2010, Cage announced on his Facebook page the beginning of a collaboration between himself and Aesop Rock called "Two of Every Animal", along with the news that there would be no new Weathermen without Camu Tao.

== Discography ==
Mixtapes

- The Conspiracy (2003)

Singles

- "The Only WEATHERMEN Song" (2001)
- "Same as It Never Was"/"Sneak Preview" 12" split with Mr. Lif & Murs (2001)
- "5 Left in the Clip"/"Tame as It Ever Was" 12" split with Tame One (2003)
- "5 Left in the Clip" Original b/w RJD2 Remix 12" (2003)

Album appearances

- "Same as It Never Was" from Definitive Jux Presents II (2001)
- "Gut You" from Eastern Conference Records (sampler) (2001)
- "5 Left in the Clip" & "Gut You" from Eastern Conference All Stars III (2002)
- "Dead Disnee" from Cage's The Purple Rain Mix CD Vol. 1 (2003)
- "Weatherwhatevermen" & "Let the Games Begin" from Eastern Conference All Stars IV (2004)
- "Reports of a Possible Kidnapping" from Definitive Jux Presents IV (2009)
- "The Only Weathermen Song" from Copywrite's The Rarities (2010)
- "Left It to Us" from Cage's Hell's Winter (2005)
- "Getaway Car" from Aesop Rock's None Shall Pass (2007)
