= Hangar 18 (band) =

American hip hop group

- Origin: New York City, New York, U.S.
- Genres: Hip hop
- Years active: 2001–2009
- Label: Definitive Jux
- Members: Alaska; Windnbreeze; DJ Pawl
- Website: hangar18.bandcamp.com

Hangar 18 was an American hip hop group from New York City, New York. It consisted of Alaska, Windnbreeze, and DJ Pawl. The group was signed to Definitive Jux.

== History ==
During their early years, Alaska and Windnbreeze were active members of the Atoms Family crew. Hangar 18 was formed after the two were joined by DJ Pawl in 2002. The group's name derives from a hangar at the Wright-Patterson Air Force Base in Ohio.

In 2004, Hangar 18 released the debut studio album, The Multi-Platinum Debut Album, on Definitive Jux. It received favorable reviews from Exclaim! and XLR8R. In 2007, the group released the second studio album, Sweep the Leg, on the label. It featured a guest appearance from Slug of Atmosphere.

== Members ==
- Alaska - rapper
- Windnbreeze - rapper
- DJ Pawl - producer, DJ

== Discography ==
=== Studio albums ===
- The Multi-Platinum Debut Album (2004)
- Sweep the Leg (2007)

=== Compilation albums ===
- The Shameless Self-Promotion CD (2003)
- The Donkey Show Volume 1 (2005)

=== Singles ===
- "Where We At?" / "Hangar 18 and the Temple of Doom" (2003)
- "Beatslope" (2004)
- "Barhoppin'" (2004)

=== Guest appearances ===
- Rob Sonic - "Sniper Picnic" from Telicatessen (2004)
- Dub-L - "World Premier" from Day of the Mega Beast! (2004)
- Fred Ones - "Evolve" from Phobia of Doors (2004)
