= DJ Fakts One =

American hip-hop DJ & producer

Fakts One
- Fakts One in 2005

Background information
- Born: Jason Goler; April 6, 1977 (age 49)
- Origin: Boston, Massachusetts, United States
- Genres: Hip-hop, East Coast hip-hop
- Occupations: DJ & Producer
- Years active: 1997–present
- Labels: Brick Records; Coup D'eTat; Definitive Jux; Nature Sounds

Fakts One (born April 6, 1977) is an American hip-hop DJ & producer from Boston, Massachusetts. Fakts One was a founding member of the hip-hop group The Perceptionists with long-time collaborators Akrobatik and Mr. Lif but left the group shortly after the release of their first album Black Dialogue.

== History ==
Raised in the historic Dudley Square (now Nubian Square) section of Roxbury, Fakts One grew up surrounded by highly influential local radio and DJs, most notably WILD 1090AM and local university stations WZBC, WMBR, WRBB, and Emerson College's WERS 88.9FM where he would spend his collegiate years (1995–1999) in Emerson's undergrad program.

Fakts One has been a key figure in Boston's music scene since the late 1990s, DJing at area hip-hop shows & WERS 88.9FM. He has performed internationally with his former group The Perceptionists, and as the tour DJ for Boston hip-hop icon Edo G.

In 2005, Mr. Lif, Akrobatik, and DJ Fakts One made their constant collaborations official to form The Perceptionists, who released Black Dialogue (Definitive Jux, 2005). The Fakts One produced song "Let's Move" was featured in the EA video games Need For Speed: Most Wanted and NBA Live 06. Also, a cover of "Five O'Clock" is Dance Dance Revolution Hottest Party 2. His tracks have also been featured in the television programs Cold Case and The Wire.

During the recording process of Black Dialogue, Fakts signed an album deal with Coup D'eTat to release Long Range, but CDT went under before the album could be released. New York-based label Nature Sounds eventually released Long Range in 2008 to critical acclaim.

After disappearing for years, he's recently resurfaced with his 2011 instrumental project The Chop Shop, and his newest project Second Chances, a collaboration effort with Alias. Both albums were released on his own label imprint, JWAYmedia.

== Discography ==
- Detonator Records Vol.1 Compilation (C-Rayz Walz, Breez Evahflowin, Snacky Chan) Detonator Records (2002)
- Black Dialogue as The Perceptionists (with Mr Lif and Akrobatik) Definitive Jux (2005)
- Long Range Nature Sounds (2008)
- The Chop Shop JWAYmedia (2011)
- "Second Chances" (with Alias) JWAYmedia/Brick Records (2012)

== Production credits ==
A detailed discography & list of production credits can be found on DISCOGS.COM
