= The Perceptionists =

American hip-hop group

- Origin: Boston, Massachusetts, U.S.
- Genre: Hip-hop
- Years active: 2004–present
- Labels: Definitive Jux; Mello Music Group
- Members: Mr. Lif; Akrobatik
- Past members: DJ Fakts One

The Perceptionists is an American hip-hop group from Boston, Massachusetts. The group initially had three members: Mr. Lif, Akrobatik, and DJ Fakts One. The group was signed to the Definitive Jux label. In 2005, the trio released a studio album, Black Dialogue. Shortly after the release of Black Dialogue, DJ Fakts One left the group. In 2017, they released their second studio album Resolution, with Mr. Lif and Akrobatik as the only two members of the group performing on the album.

== Members ==
=== Current ===
- Mr. Lif (Jeffrey Haynes) – rapper
- Akrobatik (Jared Bridgeman) – rapper

=== Former ===
- DJ Fakts One (Jason Goler) – producer, DJ

== Discography ==
=== Studio albums ===
- Black Dialogue (2005)
- Resolution (2017)

=== Live albums ===
- Live and Direct (2005)

=== Remix albums ===
- Low Resolution (2018)

=== Mixtapes ===
- The Razor (2004)

=== Singles ===
- "Medical Aid" (2004)
- "Memorial Day" (2004)
- "Blo" (2005)
- "Black Dialogue" (2005)
- "The Razor" (2005)
