= Definitive Jux =

American record label

- Founded: 1999
- Founder: Jaime "El-P" Meline; Amaechi Uzoigwe
- Defunct: 2010
- Distributors: Capitol Music Group; The Orchard
- Genre: Hip-hop; alternative hip-hop
- Country of origin: United States
- Location: New York City

Definitive Jux was a record label based in New York City, co-founded in 1999 by El-P and Amaechi Uzoigwe.

== History ==
Definitive Jux was initially known as Def Jux. However, Def Jam Recordings sued Def Jux over the similarity of their name in 2001. This lawsuit was settled out of court and the name was officially changed to Definitive Jux.

In 2003, the label released Revenge of the Robots, a documentary based on their tour of the same name from the previous year, featuring El-P, Mr. Lif, RJD2 and Murs. The DVD includes touring footage, live performances, interviews and five music videos. It was also packaged with a four track CD, including three live songs and a DJ mix by RJD2.

In February 2010, El-P announced that the label, although it would carry on selling its catalog and merchandise, would be put on hiatus as a traditional record label. He also announced that he was stepping down as artistic director of Definitive Jux to focus on producing and being a full-time artist. Ultimately, the label did not release any more music.

In 2011, The Guardian cited the label as "the beginning of backpacker hip-hop" and ranked it as the number 41 key moment in rap and R&B history.

== Roster ==
- Aesop Rock
- Cage
- Camu Tao
- Cannibal Ox
- Company Flow
- Cool Calm Pete
- C-Rayz Walz
- Danny!
- Del the Funky Homosapien
- Despot
- El-P
- Hangar 18
- Mike Ladd
- Mr. Lif
- Murs
- Party Fun Action Committee
- RJD2
- Rob Sonic
- S.A. Smash
- Sonic Sum
- The Mighty Underdogs
- The Perceptionists
- The Weathermen
- Yak Ballz

== See also ==
- List of record labels
- Underground hip-hop
