= The Tom and Jerry Comedy Show =

1980 American animated television program

- Also known as: The New Adventures of Tom and Jerry
- Genre: Variety; Comedy
- Based on: Tom and Jerry by; William Hanna; & Joseph Barbera; Droopy by Tex Avery; MGM Cartoon Studio characters
- Creative director: Don Christensen
- Voices of: Frank Welker; Lou Scheimer; Jay Scheimer; Linda Gary; Alan Oppenheimer; Erika Scheimer; Diane Pershing
- Theme music composer: Ray Ellis (as "Yvette Blais" and "Jeff Michael")
- Composers: Ray Ellis (as "Yvette Blais" and "Jeff Michael")
- Country of origin: United States
- Original language: English
- No. of seasons: 1
- No. of episodes: 15 (45 segments)

Production
- Producers: Norm Prescott; Lou Scheimer
- Running time: 21 minutes (3 7–minute segments)
- Production companies: Filmation; MGM Television

Original release
- Network: CBS
- Release: September 6 – December 13, 1980

Related
- The Tom & Jerry Show (1975); Tom & Jerry Kids (1990–1993)

The Tom and Jerry Comedy Show (also known as The New Adventures of Tom and Jerry) is an American comedy animated television series produced by Filmation in association with MGM Television featuring the popular cartoon duo Tom and Jerry. The show first aired on September 6, 1980 on CBS and continued until December 13 the same year. Its episodes were eventually added to syndicated Tom and Jerry packages in 1983. The series was broadcast on Pop in the United Kingdom in October 2013. Episodes of the show appear in reruns on Cartoon Network, and (as of October 2026) individual segments of the show still occasionally air on Boomerang, as part of an overall block of Tom and Jerry cartoons.

== Production ==
The series is the fifth incarnation of the popular Tom and Jerry cartoon franchise, and the second made-for-television production. The series was notable in being the first attempt since the closing of the MGM studio in the 1950s to restore the original format of the cat and mouse team. After the original 114 theatrical shorts run of the William Hanna and Joseph Barbera-directed series, the characters were leased to other animation studios, which changed the designs and eliminated all of the supporting characters. The previous made-for-TV series, The Tom & Jerry Show, was produced in 1975 by Hanna and Barbera under their own studio under contract to MGM, but it had made the cat and mouse friends in most of the episodes due to the reaction against violence in cartoons. MGM did not like what Hanna and Barbera had done with the characters, so they came to Filmation and asked the studio to do a new series and try to bring some life back to them. This series was able to restore the familiar slapstick chase format, though with Tom and Jerry as "competing rivals" rather than enemies, and reintroduced not only Spike and Tyke and Nibbles (here named "Tuffy"), but not Mammy Two Shoes who was retired from the cartoons in 1953 for portraying a Mammy archetype. Half-hour episodes consisted of two Tom and Jerry shorts in the first and third segments, plus one Droopy short in the middle segment, also often featuring some other classic MGM cartoon characters such as Barney Bear. Where the original series and the third series by Chuck Jones occasionally had favorable endings for Tom, this series followed the second series by Gene Deitch in almost never having definite "wins" for Tom (although he won at the end of "Most Wanted Cat" (with Jerry) and "Superstocker" and they ended off mutual in "When the Rooster Crows" and "A Connecticut Mouse In King Arthur's Cork"). Spike from Tom and Jerry was used in many of the Droopy episodes as well, filling in for the other "Spike" bulldog created by Tex Avery for the old Droopy films, who was not used as a separate character here. The villainous wolf from the classic series was also included, and named "Slick Wolf"; however, as the series was produced under the "Seal of Good Practice" code, the title character from Red Hot Riding Hood, where the Wolf debuted, did not reappear. The Droopy episodes usually featured Slick and sometimes Spike as antagonists. Barney had miscellaneous roles, such as being Droopy's boss at a movie studio in "Star-Crossed Wolf" and a frightful companion in "Scared Bear".

The show's opening begins with Tom chasing Jerry through a blank yellow screen. They continue chasing, as all of the other stars build a giant "Tom and Jerry" sign (similar to the second opening of Tom & Jerry Kids). The familiar rotating executive producer credit of Lou Scheimer and Norm Prescott briefly runs as Tom chases Jerry past the screen, knocking things over and running over others along the way. After the opening sequence, the wraparound segments, hosted by Droopy, would begin. He would start by painting the whole background with a single large brush stroke and he and the other speaking characters would engage in brief comedic sketches (like Droopy's opening poem in one of them "Roses are red, violets are blue, painting's my job, that's what I do; cute and somewhat wet").

Filmation hired John Kricfalusi in the layout department headed by Franco Cristofani, where he worked on the Droopy episodes. Eddie Fitzgerald had recently shown the studio's character designer, Alberto De Mello, some original construction model sheets of cartoon characters from the 1940s and Preston Blair's animation instruction books, much to De Mello's excitement. The animators had to draw Alberto De Mello's model sheets, but Kricfalusi refused to do so, using the old model sheets instead. Many of the scripts were written by Coslough Johnson and Jack Hanrahan, though additional episodes were written by Charlie Howell, Fitzgerald, and animators Mike Joens, Steve Clark, Tom Minton, Mike O'Connor, Jim Mueller and Wendell Washer. Despite the series' low budget, Filmation tried to let animators go wild and add slapstick. Kricfalusi and some of the animators wanted to rebel against Filmation's mandates of reusable animation and their strict "on-model" policies (where model sheets had to be traced), as seen in episodes such as "Scared Bear" and "Jerry's Country Cousin". Fitzgerald, Minton and many other storyboard artists drew lively storyboards as reference for the animators, developing unscripted sight gags as part of a rivalry with the writing staff. Some boards containing characters anticipating before running off-screen had to be redrawn to have hands with spread-out fingers instead of fists, at the insistence of CBS executive Faith Heckman. Kricfalusi found layout work easier than creating storyboards, as he could focus more on the characters' poses and expressions. He copied poses from Fitzgerald's boards, enlarged them, and added more details to the expressions and poses to break down the actions. The other layout artists in the department would come over to see and admire his work. After Kricfalusi did the layouts, Lynne Naylor would animate the Droopy episodes. At the time Kricfalusi was discovering old cartoons that he had never seen before, and tried to put elements of them into his layouts. One scene in an episode that he was doing a layout for had a character doing a fast zip pan from one area to another. Kricfalusi had been studying Chuck Jones' The Dover Boys at Pimento University, and saw abstract background pans that propelled the movement along. He drew a long panning shot of a normal background, filled with crazy, abstract shapes and floating eyeballs. A few days later, the head of the background department, Erv Kaplan, had a fit upon discovering Kricfalusi's eyeball pan and refused to paint it. He told Kricfalusi never to put eyeballs or abstract shapes in the backgrounds again. One time, Lou Scheimer saw a scene from "Pest in the West" at the Moviola, which was full of "smear frames", animated by Naylor. Offended, he threatened to fire Naylor over her use of them, but the head of the animation department went to advocate for her and managed to calm Scheimer down. Naylor kept her job, but was more cautious after that episode.

In addition to the use of limited animation, the show was characterized by a very limited music score. The particular genre of music used in the show was ragtime, in an attempt to mimic the classic cartoons (which used swing music, big band and funk music, but not ragtime). All of the shorts, both the Tom and Jerry and Droopy segments, used the same stock music, mostly created new for the series but consisting of only a handful of largely synthesized tunes, either with minor variations or played at different speeds or pitches. This did match the chase scenes, but gave the episodes a very monotonous soundtrack, making these episodes "stand out" to many Tom and Jerry viewers when they aired.

The show was called The Cat and Jam Comedy Show in an animation cel.

== Voice cast ==
Frank Welker provided voices for the first six episodes. When a Screen Actors Guild strike hit, Welker was unable to continue work, so Filmation producer Lou Scheimer had to fill in as a voice actor; Welker voiced Tyke (in "The Puppy Sitter"; the character was silent in the wraparound segments) and Droopy, and Scheimer voiced Tom, Jerry and the announcer in the series' opening, with both alternating the voices of Spike, Tuffy (Scheimer erroneously gave him an adult voice, although his voice sounded appropriately higher and childlike in the wraparound segments before "Droopy's Restless Night", "Pest in the West", "Old Mother Hubbard" and "The Great Mousini"), Slick, Barney and Tom's owner and voicing other characters in the wraparound segments and episodes. Additional voices were done by Linda Gary, Alan Oppenheimer, Diane Pershing, Jay Scheimer, Erika Scheimer and others.

- Frank Welker – Spike and Tyke (episodes 1–6), Tuffy (episodes 1-2, episode 8), Droopy, Slick (episodes 1–6, episode 12, episode 14), Barney Bear (episodes 1–6, episode 8), additional voices (episodes 1–5, episode 8, episodes 13–14)
- Lou Scheimer (uncredited) – Tom, Jerry, Spike (wraparound segments, episodes 6–15), Tuffy, Slick (wraparound segments, episodes 7–15), Barney Bear (wraparound segments, episode 4, episodes 7–15), opening announcer, additional voices
- Linda Gary (uncredited) – Additional voices (episodes 1–2, episode 14)
- Jay Scheimer (uncredited) – Additional voices (episode 2, episode 6, episode 12)
- Alan Oppenheimer (uncredited) – Additional voices (episode 3, episode 5, episode 14)
- Erika Scheimer (uncredited) – Additional voices (episode 6)
- Diane Pershing (uncredited) - Additional voices (episode 10, episode 12, episode 14)

== Episodes ==
| No. | Title | Written by | Original release date |
|---|---|---|---|
| 1a | "Farewell, Sweet Mouse" | Jack Hanrahan & Steve Clark | September 6, 1980 |
On a rainy night, while being disrupted by Jerry, Tom throws him out. Believing him to be dead, Tom is tricked into thinking Jerry is a ghost.
| 1b | "Droopy's Restless Night" | Jack Hanrahan | September 6, 1980 |
Slick Wolf is the construction foreman on a building. Droopy and Spike are his workers. Droopy keeps getting Spike in trouble with the boss all day. Droopy falls asleep, and as he sleeps, Spike has him finish the building. Slick comes in the next day and congratulates Droopy, while Spike is stuck behind a brick wall.
| 1c | "New Mouse in the House" | Jack Hanrahan | September 6, 1980 |
Tom uses a remote control female mouse (voiced by Frank Welker) to lure and trap Jerry, but his plans backfire and his owner kicks him out.
| 2a | "Heavy Booking" | Mike Joens | September 13, 1980 |
Tom chases Jerry in a library where Jerry tries to make noise to wake the enormous sleeping librarian named Hilda (voiced by Linda Gary) and a baby named Junior (voiced by Lou Scheimer), whom Hilda is babysitting.
| 2b | "Matterhorn Droopy" | Charlie Howell | September 13, 1980 |
Droopy wants to be a rescue dog. Pretending to own the rescue dog school, Slick Wolf takes his money and tries to do him in without any success.
| 2c | "The Puppy Sitter" | Jack Hanrahan & Steve Clark | September 13, 1980 |
While Tom is left with Spike's little son Tyke, trying to keep him amused, Jerry tries to make Tom's job difficult.
| 3a | "Most Wanted Cat" | Jack Hanrahan & Steve Clark | September 20, 1980 |
Tired of Jerry toying with him, Tom leaves the house. Jerry tries hard to get Tom back before his owner calls pest control.
| 3b | "Pest in the West" | Coslough Johnson | September 20, 1980 |
Droopy is a stagecoach driver. Slick Wolf and Spike make several attempts to rob the coach (with Spike frequently dressing in drag to stop the coach), but they are not successful, and they eventually land in jail.
| 3c | "Cat in the Fiddle" | Jack Hanrahan & Tom Minton | September 20, 1980 |
Tom plays a violin, but Jerry tries to stop Tom due to his cacophonic tunes and they trash the orchestra.
| 4a | "Invasion of the Mouse Snatchers" | Eddie Fitzgerald | September 27, 1980 |
Tom tricks Jerry into thinking he is an alien that is going to blow up Earth. Jerry gets revenge by activating his secret weapon.
| 4b | "The Incredible Droop" | Coslough Johnson | September 27, 1980 |
An Oriental mad scientist (voiced by Frank Welker) has invented a mystery ray gun. He tells Droopy and Barney Bear to guard it from people. Droopy must protect it from falling into the wrong hands by using a rather unusual method: a Jekyll and Hyde formula. Slick Wolf tries to steal it, but Droopy keeps turning into a large monster, who then beats him up. Droopy frees himself and Barney from Slick's trap, and chases Slick away.
| 4c | "The Plaid Baron Strikes Again" | Coslough Johnson & Mike Joens | September 27, 1980 |
Tom chases Jerry as he flies in a model airplane, destroying Spike's big model airplane in the process.
| 5a | "Incredible Shrinking Cat" | Coslough Johnson & Mike O'Connor | October 4, 1980 |
Jerry gets hold of a mad scientist's (voiced by Frank Welker) size modifier in order to shrink Tom and enlarge himself.
| 5b | "Scared Bear" | Coslough Johnson | October 4, 1980 |
Droopy and Barney explore an old house looking for treasure. Slick Wolf decides to scare them off by disguising himself as a ghost.
| 5c | "When the Rooster Crows" | Coslough Johnson | October 4, 1980 |
Jerry uses a stranded circus rooster (voiced by Lou Scheimer) to rudely awaken Tom, but it gives itself away with an intensified crowing.
| 6a | "School for Cats" | Jim Mueller, Jack Hanrahan & Wendell Washer | October 11, 1980 |
Tom is sent to a military school for cats, coached by Spike. Jerry makes Tom's rigorous training a torment.
| 6b | "Disco Droopy" | Jack Hanrahan | October 11, 1980 |
Droopy enters a disco contest at the Slipped Disco nightclub. His opponent is a conceited Slick Wolf, and the master of ceremonies is Spike. Despite Slick's many attempts to beat Droopy, he loses the contest and Droopy wins.
| 6c | "Pied Piper Puss" | Coslough Johnson | October 11, 1980 |
Tom is sent to catch Jerry and Tuffy using a flute to lure them, until Tuffy gets a hold of it.
| 7a | "Under the Big Top" | Coslough Johnson | October 18, 1980 |
Jerry gets Tom involved in a circus act and proceeds to make his act a dangerous and humiliating performance.
| 7b | "Lumber Jerks" | Coslough Johnson | October 18, 1980 |
Droopy and Slick Wolf are competing against each other in a series of lumber-related games.
| 7c | "Gopher It, Tom" | Jack Hanrahan & Steve Clark | October 18, 1980 |
Tom is sent by his master to catch a gopher (voiced by Lou Scheimer) eating the garden vegetables, but Jerry thwarts his efforts.
| 8a | "Snowbrawl" | Jack Hanrahan & Jim Mueller | October 25, 1980 |
On Christmas Eve, Tom and Jerry outsmart each other to get one of them locked outside the house.
| 8b | "Getting the Foot" | Jack Hanrahan | October 25, 1980 |
Droopy and Slick Wolf are photographers for the Daily Bugle. They are assigned to get a picture of Bigfoot (voiced by Lou Scheimer), and Slick tries various schemes to sabotage Droopy's pictures, including dressing in drag as a female Bigfoot. Droopy ends up getting his pictures, and Bigfoot throws Slick in the newspaper press.
| 8c | "Kitty Hawk Kitty" | Jack Hanrahan | October 25, 1980 |
In 1908, Tom was chosen to be the test pilot of the Wright Brothers' (voiced by Lou Scheimer) airplane, but Jerry was credited for a successful flight.
| 9a | "Get Along, Little Jerry" | Coslough Johnson | November 1, 1980 |
Tom chases Jerry on a Texas ranch, where he causes inconvenience for Spike and gets entangled in cowboy events.
| 9b | "Star-Crossed Wolf" | Jack Hanrahan | November 1, 1980 |
Slick Wolf tries to get in a Hollywood movie studio known as Behemoth Studio, only to be foiled by security guard Droopy.
| 9c | "Spike's Birthday" | Jack Hanrahan | November 1, 1980 |
Jerry takes advantage of Tom, who is left to guard Spike's party food, and Tom barely escapes his predicament.
| 10a | "No Museum Peace" | Coslough Johnson | November 8, 1980 |
Tom chases after Jerry and Tuffy around a museum to get his fish back, but Spike keeps kicking him out.
| 10b | "A Day at the Bakery" | Jack Hanrahan | November 8, 1980 |
Droopy and Spike work in a bakery managed by Barney. When they are assigned to make a cake for a female movie celebrity named Farah Wolfhound (voiced by Lou Scheimer), they compete to design the best cake. Eventually, Spike delivers the cake to Farah, who is surprised by seeing Droopy inside the cake.
| 10c | "Mouse Over Miami" | Jack Hanrahan | November 8, 1980 |
Spike restricts Tom from catching Jerry in Miami, but Tom tries to anyway and Spike sends Tom back to his house in the middle of winter.
| 11a | "The Trojan Dog" | Coslough Johnson | November 15, 1980 |
Jerry uses a robot dog to scare off Tom and access the fridge. Tom tries to use a Trojan dog to get at Jerry, but the plan backfires.
| 11b | "Foreign Legion Droopy" | Coslough Johnson | November 15, 1980 |
Droopy is sent out on a dangerous assignment: he must track down the wolf in sheik's clothing!
| 11c | "Pie in the Sky" | Jim Mueller | November 15, 1980 |
A peckish Tom chases Jerry around a construction site, getting pinned down by Spike.
| 12a | "Save That Mouse" | Coslough Johnson | November 22, 1980 |
Tom's owner's sister (voiced by Diane Pershing) mistakes Jerry for a hamster and will not let Tom touch him.
| 12b | "Old Mother Hubbard" | Jack Hanrahan | November 22, 1980 |
Droopy is in Storybook Land. Red Riding Hood (voiced by Diane Pershing) is delivering food to Grandma's house, and Slick Wolf tries to steal the food. Droopy foils Slick, and he goes to visit Goldilocks (voiced by Diane Pershing). She lives with three gorillas (subletted from the Three Bears) (voiced by Lou Scheimer), and while Slick looks for food to steal, the gorillas return and chase him away.
| 12c | "Say What?" | Jack Hanrahan | November 22, 1980 |
Tom's owner has received a parrot named Bertram (voiced by Lou Scheimer). When Tom rounds on him, Bertram and Jerry work together to make Tom's chase into double trouble.
| 13a | "Superstocker" | Coslough Johnson | November 29, 1980 |
Tom chases Jerry in a supermarket in order to protect the food products. They both end up trashing the place.
| 13b | "Droopy's Good Luck Charm" | Coslough Johnson | November 29, 1980 |
Slick Wolf sells Droopy a good-luck charm for $5. Spike tells him that it was really a good-luck charm, and the two try various ways of getting it back, with their attempts backfiring each time. Spike offers to buy it back for $10, and Droopy sells it back to him. Slick and Spike see a sidewalk salesman (voiced by Lou Scheimer) selling about 30 of them, and Slick chases after Spike for wasting their money.
| 13c | "The Great Mousini" | Jack Hanrahan | November 29, 1980 |
Jerry joins a circus as the escape artist Mousini with Tom as his co-star. They lose their jobs after their latest performance.
| 14a | "Jerry's Country Cousin" | Jack Hanrahan | December 6, 1980 |
Jerry's identical, yet strong cousin (voiced by Lou Scheimer) comes to visit. Tom retreats after Jerry's cousin ruins his mistress' daughter's wedding buffet with a sounder of pigs.
| 14b | "The Great Diamond Heist" | Coslough Johnson | December 6, 1980 |
Inspector Droopy searches for a stolen diamond.
| 14c | "Mechanical Failure" | Coslough Johnson | December 6, 1980 |
Tom's owner has brought a robot maid (voiced by Linda Gary), which Tom and Jerry use against each other until it goes out of control.
| 15a | "A Connecticut Mouse in King Arthur's Cork" | Coslough Johnson | December 13, 1980 |
Tom dreams his chase with Jerry as a medieval quest scenario.
| 15b | "The Great Train Rubbery" | Jack Hanrahan | December 13, 1980 |
Droopy is the mail clerk on a train out West, and receives a package to deliver to a bank. Slick Wolf hears this, and he proceeds to try and steal it, figuring that it must be money. After a number of attempts, he succeeds, but is arrested by the sheriff. The package contains not cash, but "Wanted" posters for Slick Wolf. Droopy receives the reward for his capture. Note: This is the final Droopy short.
| 15c | "Stage Struck" | Coslough Johnson | December 13, 1980 |
Jealous of Spike's appreciation for Jerry's dance talent, Tom tries to interfere, but they go along with their performance. Note: This is the final Tom and Jerry short and the final segment of the series overall.

== Home media ==
The rights to The Tom and Jerry Comedy Show are currently owned by Warner Bros. through its Turner Entertainment Co. banner. However, due to the show's negative reception and legal issues involving MGM outsourcing the animation to Filmation (whose library is owned by DreamWorks Animation), Warner Bros. has no plans for a DVD box set of the show. However, one episode, "Jerry's Country Cousin", did surface on Tom and Jerry: The Deluxe Anniversary Collection in 2010. In late 2022, another episode, "Snowbrawl", was included as one of the three bonus cartoons on the Tom and Jerry: Snowman's Land DVD. Almost all the Tom and Jerry segments of this incarnation (along with 8 Droopy segments) were available on the Boomerang app until its closure in 2024.

== See also ==
- Tom and Jerry Television
