= Atari Blitzkrieg =

American rapper

Background information
- Also known as: Sub.Stance
- Born: Chris Moore; August 16, 1980 (age 45)
- Origin: Virginia, United States
- Genres: Hip-hop, alternative hip-hop, cyberpunk rap
- Occupations: Rapper, producer
- Instruments: Turntables, synthesizers, drums
- Years active: 1994–present
- Labels: Godsendant Music; Sheltered Fallout Records
- Website: www.iamsubstance.com

Chris Moore, known as Atari Blitzkrieg, is a Virginia based American hip-hop artist. He is known for his heavy use of alliteration, multi-syllabic rhyming schemes, and incorporation of various genres into his music.

A review on Music Zeitgeist states, "Atari Blitzkrieg is not a noise-core post-electro-clash/Blade Runner tributary. Evoking something more along the lines of Jedi Mind Tricks sharing kind with Common and maybe even MC. 900 Ft. Jesus, Atari Blitzkrieg is ready to drop a fat collection of eloquence and Cheshire Cat propensity on the sleepy indie music world."

== History ==
Chris Moore was exposed to a wide range of musical genres at an early age. He began experimenting with music as a cellist in elementary school. This led to acquiring a thrift store turntable at 12, a drum machine at 14 and a microphone at 15. As Atari (under the name Krohme), he created his first recorded songs in 1995. His first on-record appearance as Atari didn't occur until 2006, with several contributions to Krohme's The Beasts Released: South of Heaven Volume 1. This led to the 2007's Rokkonorrottenhell single, featuring Royce Da 5'9, Groovie Mann from the industrial band My Life with the Thrill Kill Kult and producer Krohme.

Since then, he has been nominated as an URB Next 1000, released nearly 400 songs, unveiled 25 EPs, 3 full-length albums, dozens of guest appearances while working with some of the biggest names in music; Speech of Arrested Development, The Game, Sid Wilson, Lord Jamar, Daedelus, Rapper Pooh, Louis Logic, Vast Aire, Guilty Simpson, LMNO, Ryu of Styles of Beyond, Breez Evahflowin, Motion Man and Wildchild to name a few. His greatest success came in 2011 with the release of Super, his Super NES-themed release.

== Discography ==
Albums

- 2009: Kick, Punch, Fight, Rhyme
- 2009: 12.31.99
- 2010: Serial Port Experiments w/ The Digital Fiend
- 2011: Super

EPs

- 2007: iGod
- 2008: Black
- 2008: <3:lessthanthree
- 2008: Electric Kool-Aid Acid Test
- 2008: A Hand-Made Soul
- 2008: The Apollo Creed Episodes
- 2008: The Apex of Excitement
- 2008: Apologies for None
- 2009: The Central Parking Lot Rangers
- 2009: Ain't Dead Yet
- 2009: August Plush
- 2009: Ex Nihilo
- 2009: 12.30.99
- 2010: 12.30.99 Black
- 2010: AlphaBetaC-EP
- 2010: Perfect Blue
- 2010: Half Past Midnight
- 2011: The Moments That Unfold Before Me in Life
- 2011: Chase the Dragon w/ The Digital Fiend
- 2011: <3: Lessthanthree Volume 2 - Elevation from the Endless Void of Manufactured Insanity
- 2011: Super
- 2012: Magnificent Blitzkrieg w/ magOwl
- 2012: Dracula Baby and Other Pimp Tales w/ Vinyl Pimp Cobras
- 2012: Air Christ
- 2013: Neber Pills w/ Digital Fiend
- 2019: Mostly Ill but Sometimes Sick w/ Dirt E. Dutch

Singles

- 2007: Rokkonorrottenhell
- 2007: The Forsaken 2.0
- 2008: Electric Kool-Aid Acid Test
- 2008: Morgan Freeman
- 2009: Subconscious Tales of Dream Kids in Utero
- 2009: The Central Parking Lot Rangers
- 2009: WTF!!!
- 2009: 1-800-Be-Atari
- 2009: Blood Coffee
- 2009: New Rose Wilts
- 2009: Flawed Human Interactions
- 2009: Damnation Alley
- 2010: The Hatred to Be
- 2010: Outta Time
- 2010: The Maturation of Nothingness (Produced by Daedelus)
- 2011: Flash the Blitz
- 2011: Yellow
- 2011: Super
- 2012: The Chill
- 2012: Gowithaflow
- 2013: Bigfoot
- 2020: Ucantcdaforest w/ Breez Evahflowin & Mr. Lif
