= IndieFeed =

- Genre: Music

Cast and voices
- Hosted by: Chris MacDonald, Dirt E. Dutch, Eric Gordon, Hieronymus Murphy, Wess “Mongo” Jolley, Jaime Ravenet

Publication
- Original release: 2004

Related
- Website: http://indiefeed.com/

IndieFeed was a music discovery podcast, playlist and web service, founded in 2004, which offered new music from independent artists in the form of single song shows. Shows included a brief introduction, a featured music track, info about the artist and where to find more.

IndieFeed comprised six music channels: Alternative / Modern Rock, Blues, Dance, Electronica, Hip Hop and Indie-Pop. Each channel was managed by a host who delivered programming within the constraints of the genre. Archived shows are available at no charge for download and subscription via iTunes Store. IndieFeed also offered playlists that grew throughout the month on music streaming services Spotify, Rdio and Rhapsody.

IndieFeed was named one of Apple's Best Podcasts in 2007 and 2008. In 2010, Mashable named IndieFeed one of 7 Essential Podcasts You Should Add To Your Playlist.

Founder and host Chris MacDonald is current co-founder of HugeFan, an experiential marketplace for performers. He formerly chaired the Association for Downloadable Media, and was executive vice president of business development and operations at Liberated Syndication, the enterprise podcast service that hosts IndieFeed, and he is a frequent speaker on matters of downloadable and new media and direct-to-fan experiences. Chris recently launched a beard care product line known as Beardashery.

== Content Submission ==
IndieFeed received and reviewed content submitted from artists through its website. All featured content was rights cleared, meaning that the owner provides permission to publish through IndieFeed.

== Hosts ==
IndieFeed channels were managed by a collective of curators, who hosted and produced shows featured on the IndieFeed network. Past hosts include:

- Chris MacDonald – Founder and host of multiple IndieFeed Channels, Chris is co-founder of HugeFan, an experiential marketplace for performers, was chairman of the Association for Downloadable Media (ADM), and frequent speaker on matters of downloadable and new media, having spoken at: NAB Radio Show, South By Southwest Interactive, Dow Jones Venture Voice, Future of Music Coalition Policy Summit, Social Media and Government Conference, Corporate Podcasting Conference (London and Silicon Valley) iBreakfast NYC, American Petroleum Institute New Media Summit and VONx.
- Dirt E. Dutch – Longtime host and producer of the IndieFeed HipHop Channel, Dirt E. Dutch is also a member of the underground record label Little Ax and the CT hip hop coalition Antfarm Affiliates. In addition to releasing two LPs with NYC rapper Breez Evahflowin, he has contributed to numerous artist releases, including releases for Emskee of the Good People, Phenetiks and Rising Sun Quest.
- Eric Gordon – Former host and producer of the IndieFeed Dance Channel, Eric is also assistant director Audio & Video Systems & Services at American University with BS in audio technology and nightclub DJ.
- Wess “Mongo” Jolley – Former host and producer of the IndieFeed Performance Poetry Channel, Mongo is a poet and poetry promoter.

Former hosts include:

- Hieronymus Murphy – Host and producer of the IndieFeed Blues Channel and Murphy's Saloon Blues Podcast.
- Jaime Ravenet – Co-host of IndieFeed's Alternative, Indie Pop, and Electronica channels.
