= List of DuckTales (1987 TV series) episodes =

The following is an episode list for the Disney animated television series DuckTales. The series is based on the Scrooge McDuck character and the Uncle Scrooge comic books created by Carl Barks. The series stars Scrooge, his great-nephews Huey, Dewey, and Louie and Webby Vanderquack, and several characters created for the series. While Huey, Dewey, and Louie originated in Donald Duck animated short subjects in the 1930s, their characterization on DuckTales approximated that of Barks' comics. Although Donald Duck was a major player in the Uncle Scrooge comics, he appeared as a guest star in a few DuckTales episodes.

The series aired in syndication. It premiered during the week of September 14–18, 1987 with an edited two-hour television movie version of the five-part serial "Treasure of the Golden Suns". (The airdate varied by market – WSYT aired it on September 18, while WSBK-TV aired it on September 20). Subsequently, on September 21, 1987, the series began airing in its regular time slot on weekdays. ("Treasure of the Golden Suns" first appeared in its serialized form from November 9–13, 1987). The first season, totaling 65 episodes, aired its finale, "Till Nephews Do Us Part", on January 1, 1988.

Ten episodes premiered during the second season, and 18 in the third. Three episodes produced for the third season were held back for broadcast until the fall of 1990, when the series was incorporated into The Disney Afternoon. Seven additional episodes were produced for its short final season, totaling 100 for the series. The show aired its final episode on November 28, 1990.

All 100 episodes from all 4 seasons are available on DVD in Region 1. The first twenty individual episodes of season one, numbered 6 to 25 in the list below, are also available on DVD in Region 2.

== Series overview ==
Season	Episodes	Originally released	
Season	Episodes	First released	Last released
1	65	September 18, 1987	January 1, 1988
2	10	November 24, 1988	March 26, 1989
3	18	September 18, 1989	February 11, 1990
Film		August 3, 1990	
4	7	September 10, 1990	November 28, 1990

== Episodes ==
=== Season 1 (1987–1988) ===
No. overall	No. in series	Title	Directed by	Written by	Original release date	Prod. code
1	1	"Don't Give Up the Ship"	Alan Zaslove	Story by : Mark Zaslove; Teleplay by : Jymn Magon and Bruce Talkington	September 18, 1987	124
Part 1 of Treasure of the Golden Suns, Donald Duck, having joined the Navy to see the world, sends his nephews Huey, Dewey, and Louie to live with his uncle Scrooge McDuck. Meanwhile, a mysterious figure known as El Capitán busts the Beagle Boys out of jail, whereupon he hires them to steal a model Spanish galleon from Scrooge's possession, which just happens to hide a treasure map to a vast fortune.
2	2	"Wronguay in Ronguay"	Steve Clark	Story by : Jymn Magon and Bruce Talkington; Teleplay by : Mark Zaslove	September 18, 1987	125
Part 2 of Treasure of the Golden Suns, After foiling the Beagle Boys, Scrooge attempts to determine the nature of the map, until his nephews discover it leads to a sunken treasure ship hidden in the South American nation of Ronguay. Naturally, the group decide to go after it, but El Capitán is eager to thwart this, and recruits assistance from Scrooge's chief rival, Flintheart Glomgold, with promises to help him become more wealthier with the treasure.: Note: The element of whoever loses the bet having to eat Flintheart's hat, is lifted from the comic book story, "The Money Champ" (Uncle Scrooge #27, July 1959) by Carl Barks, in which the loser of that story's bet had to eat Scrooge's hat.
3	3	"Three Ducks of the Condor"	Alan Zaslove	Story by : Mark Zaslove; Teleplay by : Jymn Magon and Bruce Talkington	September 18, 1987	126
Part 3 of Treasure of the Golden Suns, Having returned from South America, Scrooge discovers a golden coin he acquired is part of the treasure of the Golden Suns. With a plane by inventor Gyro Gearloose, and piloted by Launchpad McQuack, he finds himself heading for the Andes Mountains without the boys, instead abducting his nephew Donald from the Navy to find the map that leads to the treasure.
4	4	"Cold Duck"	Terence Harrison	Story by : Jymn Magon and Bruce Talkington; Teleplay by : Mark Zaslove	September 18, 1987	127
Part 4 of Treasure of the Golden Suns, Launchpad finds himself forced to accept help from the nephews, their new nanny Mrs. Beakley, and her granddaughter Webby, in order to track down Scrooge in Antarctica. They soon find he was captured by a city of penguins for trying to steal the second half of the treasure map he seeks, but making a daring attempt to get it with some unexpected help from a young penguin girl Webby befriends.
5	5	"Too Much of a Gold Thing"	Alan Zaslove	Jymn Magon, Bruce Talkington and Mark Zaslove	September 18, 1987	128
Part 5 of Treasure of the Golden Suns, Scrooge and his family proceed to the Valley of the Golden Sun in order to track down the lost treasure, all the while being pursued by El Capitán. In the process of trying to track it down, the nephews become worried that Scrooge might be developing gold fever. They're soon proven right, when he and El Capitán reveal they are only interested in the gold, even if they are putting all their lives in danger.
6	6	"Send in the Clones"	Alan Zaslove	Story by : Astrid Ryterband; Teleplay by : Ken Koonce and David Weimers	September 21, 1987	4412-020
Evil sorceress Magica DeSpell, eager to get her hands on Scrooge's Number One Dime, breaks out the Beagle Boys to help her steal it. Using a cloning spell, the crooks are made into identical copies of Huey, Dewey, and Louie, just as Scrooge has invited a TV crew to interview him about his new life with them, causing confusion in the process. Then Huey is mistakenly taken along with the Dime.
7	7	"Sphinx for the Memories"	David Block	Michael Keyes	September 22, 1987	141
Donald had shore-leave in Egypt, in hopes of seeing Scrooge and his nephews. But a neo-ancient Egyptian Civilization cult abducts Donald, believing he is the physical embodiment of their home's former Pharaoh. Scrooge and the boys are forced to pursue after him, not only to prevent Donald being taken over by the Pharaoh's spirit, but also to stop a jealous high-priest placing him in danger with a troublesome mummy.
8	8	"Where No Duck Has Gone Before"	David Block	Len Uhley	September 23, 1987	4412-033
Gyro's props for a science fiction television show accidentally launch the cast into space, and Launchpad becomes the hero when it is realized that he is the only real pilot on board. Spoofs Star Trek extensively.
9	9	"Armstrong"	Alan Zaslove	Michael Keyes	September 24, 1987	4412-014
Gyro presents to Scrooge a brand new invention in the form of a sophisticated robot called Armstrong. Both he and his family are impressed with it, but unknown to Gyro, Armstrong decided it prefers to be in control, and he soon begins taking over everything. The nephews soon have to launch a rescue, with aid from Launchpad.
10	10	"Robot Robbers"	Alan Zaslove	Story by : Carl Barks; Teleplay by : Michael Keyes	September 25, 1987	4412-034
Scrooge is shocked when Glomgold lands a contract to build a new bank for Duckburg, using giant human-operated robots created by Gyro. Unfortunately, Ma Beagle sees an opportunity in them for a crime spree, and so with some of the Beagle Boys to assist, hijacks the robots. Scrooge and Glomgold find themselves forced to work together to stop them.: Absent: Huey, Dewey and Louie
11	11	"Magica's Shadow War"	David Block	Randy Lofficier	September 28, 1987	4412-035
Magica devises a new scheme to steal Scrooge's Number One Dime, by making her shadow come to life and acquire it. But after it bungles the job and she berates it, her shadow decides to work for itself, not only to steal the Dime, but to bring all the shadows in the world to life. It's not long before Scrooge and Magica are forced to work together to prevent this.
12	12	"Master of the Djinni"	Alan Zaslove	Sam Joseph and Manette Beth Rosen	September 29, 1987	4412-010
Scrooge and Glomgold race for mastership of Aladdin's genie, but the struggle causes them to be sent back in time to the Arabian Nights, while the genie stays in the present and enjoys the comforts of modern living. For the two billionaires, their only hope is to resolve a problem in the past to return to the present, even if both of them desire to make their wishes come true.
13	13	"Hotel Strangeduck"	Alan Zaslove	Richard Merwin	September 30, 1987	4412-022
Scrooge turns a castle once owned by a mad scientist into a hotel, but he does not believe that the place is haunted. Contains imagery in tribute to "The Old Castle's Secret" (1948) and "The Phantom of Notre Duck" (1964) from the old comic books.
14	14	"Lost Crown of Genghis Khan"	Alan Zaslove	Story by : Carl Barks; Teleplay by : Anthony Adams	October 1, 1987	4412-008
Scrooge goes searching for a crown in the Himalayas, which is guarded by a snow beast.: Note: The episode is inspired by the comic book story, "The Lost Crown of Genghis Khan!" (Uncle Scrooge #14, May 1956).
15	15	"Duckman of Aquatraz"	Steve Clark	Francis Moss	October 2, 1987	4412-027
Scrooge is shocked when he is arrested on claims he stole a painting from Glomgold's art gallery. Found guilty in his trial, he is sent to Aquatraz, where he finds himself winning respect by showing how tough he can be. Meanwhile, Huey, Dewey, and Louie work to prove his innocence, and soon discover that Glomgold may have framed Scrooge for a crime he didn't commit.
16	16	"The Money Vanishes"	Steve Clark	David Schwartz	October 5, 1987	4412-007
The Beagle Boys, having broken out of jail, discover that Gyro has invented a handheld teleporter for moving furniture that is sprayed with a special compound. Tricking Gyro out of his invention, the Beagles than proceed to trick Scrooge into spraying his fortune with the compound. But they underestimate the nephews, who are quick to do what they can to thwart them.
17	17	"Sir Gyro de Gearloose"	Steve Clark	Mark Zaslove	October 6, 1987	115
Gyro, tired of being looked upon as a "gadget man", invents a time machine and uses it to go back in time to the Middle Ages with Huey, Dewey and Louie, where he signs up as a knight with King Artie of Quackelot.: Absent: Scrooge
18	18	"Dinosaur Ducks"	Alan Zaslove	Ken Koonce and David Weimers	October 7, 1987	106
Launchpad manages to discover a hidden world where dinosaurs still live, which prompts Scrooge to see them for himself and see how to profit from it. But Huey, Dewey, Louie, and Webby tag along, getting themselves into trouble when they learn that along with dinosaurs, the hidden land is also home to a primitive tribe of cave-ducks.
19	19	"Hero for Hire"	Steve Clark	Ken Koonce and David Weimers	October 8, 1987	113
After being fired by Scrooge, Launchpad is tricked by the Beagle Boys into performing a series of bank robberies disguised as movie scenes.: Absent: Huey, Dewey and Louie
20	20	"Superdoo!"	Steve Clark	Michael Keyes	October 9, 1987	121
Having a hard time at camp, Doofus accidentally finds a stolen alien crystal that grants him numerous super powers. But the aliens who lost it want it back.: Absent: Scrooge
21	21	"Maid of the Myth"	Alan Zaslove	Anthony Adams	October 12, 1987	112
During an opera performance she is participating in concerning Vikings, Mrs. Beakley is horrified when she is abducted by real Vikings who have come to plunder Duckbirg. Scrooge, accompanied by the nephews, Webby, and Launchpad, pursue them to a remotely secluded island near Greenland, where they soon have to challenge the Vikings to rescue Beakley and put a stop to further Viking raids. Loosely based on the Carl Barks story "Mythtic Mystery" (Uncle Scrooge 34, 1961). The setting is also similar to the Disney movie The Island at the Top of the World (1974).
22	22	"Down & Out in Duckburg"	Terence Harrison	Ken Koonce and David Weimers	October 13, 1987	4412-047
Scrooge is put in his place for his lack of charity by a schadenfreude fox called Fritter O'Way, who had a historical contract from his scheming company's boss ancestor, signed by Scrooge's sea captain ancestor in a time when the Plimsoll Line wasn't standardized, and as a result, by failing to complete a cargo deal during a storm, Scrooge's ancestor was indebted to the company's boss for everything he owns, especially his gold watch, the only item he was able to save in which he ran away with. Revealed by Scrooge that the watch started his family fortune, he was now indebted to the descendant of the company's boss, but instead of throwing them out, decided to treat them as his servants, having the mansion and everything painted in a tacky fashion, the furniture replaced with inflatable furniture, and the money bin being drained and squandered away. Soon, Scrooge and the entire family had enough and left the spiteful Fritter O'Way. Penniless, Scrooge finds his entire family willing to stand by him, as he tries to find someway for them to cope in the poorhouse. The only solution soon comes to finding the missing cargo and delivering it. When he found out about this, Fritter O'Way tried to stop Scrooge over his family's hatred towards him and to keep his newfound riches, only to fall overboard and when asking Scrooge to be saved, he threw to him the cargo which he angrily refused, and to sign a form that the debt has been paid. Reluctantly, Fritter O'Way signed it, and while Scrooge finds taking a liking to the golden rule of life after returning to his manor, Fritter O'Way was reduced to repainting Scrooge's manor. Based on the Carl Barks story "The Horseradish Treasure, or Trouble From Long Ago" (Uncle Scrooge 3, 1953).
23	23	"Much Ado About Scrooge"	David Block	Michael Keyes	October 14, 1987	131
After a visit by master salesman Filler Brushbill, Scrooge and the nephews find a hidden note by famed playwright William Drakespeare, amongst a collection of his plays, concerning a lost play. Travelling to the island of Great Written, they seek to find it, but Brushbill, learning of this, attempts to find it himself, even if means the whole group contending with descendants of the actors from Drakespeare's performances.
24	24	"Top Duck"	Alan Zaslove	Richard Merwin	October 15, 1987	132
Launchpad's family comes to visit while the Beagle Boys eye Scrooge's new jet so that they can use it to pilfer his Money Bin.
25	25	"Pearl of Wisdom"	Steve Clark	Michael Keyes	October 16, 1987	109
A pair of thieves steal a pearl from a remote Pacific island tribe, and sell it on to Scrooge. To his surprise, he learns that the pearl will grant him infinite wisdom if is taken back to its homeland. However, Webby borrows it for a marble competition, forcing Scrooge to go after it. However, the thieves that sold it soon want to get it back, after discovering the pearl's true value.
26	26	"The Curse of Castle McDuck"	Steve Clark	Anthony Adams	October 19, 1987	119
Scrooge, the nephews, and Webby visit Scrooge's ancestral home in Scotland, only to be embroiled in a mystery surrounding Castle McDuck, involving Druids and a Ghost Hound. Based loosely on the comic book story "Hound of the Whiskervilles" (Uncle Scrooge #29, 1960), which in turn was based on Arthur Conan Doyle's The Hound of the Baskervilles. Other elements are similar to another comic book story, "The Old Castle's Secret" (1948).
27	27	"Launchpad's Civil War"	Steve Clark	Pamela Hickey and Dennys McCoy	October 20, 1987	123
When going to Duck Ridge for an American Civil War reenactment, Launchpad encounters aged Union veterans who once served under his ancestor, who lost a battle. Launchpad works to avenge his family's honor by rallying the old veterans to a "rematch" of sorts against the reenactors.: Absent: Scrooge
28	28	"Sweet Duck of Youth"	Steve Clark	Ken Koonce and David Weimers	October 21, 1987	4412-003
Scrooge, Launchpad, and the nephews, head to the Okeefadokie Swamp in Florida, after coming across information that it could be the site of the fabled Fountain of Youth from Spanish mythology. Scrooge is eager to find it, after believing his old age is now a hindrance to himself. However, once there, they find themselves hounded by the ghost of Poncey De Loon, the Spanish conquistador who found the fountain.
29	29	"Earth Quack"	Alan Zaslove	Story by : Carl Barks; Teleplay by : Mark Young	October 22, 1987	102
Duckburg is being plagued by earthquakes, causing Scrooge to be concerned his Money Bin might get hit and his fortune lost. Gyro invents a giant shock absorber to prevent this happening, but which requires it be placed into the faultline under the city. When the workforce become spooked while underground, Scrooge and his nephews venture down to find out why. They soon discover that an underground civilization is causing the earthquakes as part of a sport, unaware of the trouble it is causing.: Note: The episode is based on the comic book story, "Land Beneath the Ground!" (Uncle Scrooge #13, January 1956).
30	30	"Home Sweet Homer"	Alan Zaslove	Anthony Adams	October 23, 1987	130
In Ancient Greece, the wicked sorceress Circe attempts to interfere in the efforts of Homer to rescue his love and their city from her magic. Meanwhile, in the present, Scrooge and the nephews are seeking out the city after identifying the remains of a statue from one of Donald's many photos he sends back. A freak accident with one of Circe's spells soon sends the group into the past, where they become involved in Homer's adventure.
31	31	"Bermuda Triangle Tangle"	Steve Clark	Frank Ridgeway	October 26, 1987	117
Scrooge seeks to find out why his ships are disappearing in the Bermuda Triangle.
32	32	"Micro Ducks from Outer Space"	Alan Zaslove	Story by : Carl Barks; Teleplay by : Jack Hanrahan and Eleanor Burian-Mohr	October 27, 1987	4412-004
Scrooge misuses an alien size-shifting device, and accidentally ends up shrinking himself, the boys, and Webby, to the size of ants.: Note: The episode is inspired by the comic book story, "Micro-Ducks from Outer Space" (Uncle Scrooge #65, July 1966). However, its plot more closely resembles the movie Honey, I Shrunk the Kids (1989) which was in pre-production at the time.
33	33	"Back to the Klondike"	Steve Clark	Story by : Carl Barks; Teleplay by : Tedd Anasti and Patsy Cameron	October 28, 1987	4412-001
Scrooge takes the kids to the Klondike, where he met an old flame, Glittering Goldie.: Note: The episode is based on the comic book story, "Back to the Klondike" (Four Color #456, January 1953). (First uncut printing, Walt Disney's Uncle $crooge McDuck: His Life and Times by Carl Barks Vol. 1, 1981)
34	34	"Horse Scents"	Alan Zaslove	Earl Kress	October 29, 1987	4412-018
Scrooge and Glomgold look forward to the Kenducky Derby, in the hopes of seeing who can win it. At the same time, Webby befriends a horse called Milady, who loves being photographed. Milady's owner is in debt to a local rancher who has an abusive streak. Webby enters Milady into the Derby, with help from the nephews and Mrs. Beakley help out, especially when the rancher attempts to claim the horse back.: Note: The plot of the episode is inspired by the 1932 film Horse Feathers.
35	35	"Scrooge's Pet"	Steve Clark	Jack Enyart	October 30, 1987	4412-005
Scrooge loses the new combination for his vault to a lemming that the boys and Webby got him as a pet.: Note: The episode is based on the comic book story, "The Lemming with the Locket" (Uncle Scrooge #9, January 1955) by Carl Barks.
36	36	"A Drain on the Economy"	Alan Zaslove	Story by : Jymn Magon, Bruce Talkington, and Mark Zaslove; Teleplay by : Len Uhley	November 2, 1987	137
Part 1 of Catch as Cash Can, Scrooge and Glomgold compete in a contest where the winner, being the world's richest duck, becomes the sales broker for a new fruit from Macaroon that works like a flashlight. First, though, Scrooge must keep his fortune away from the Beagle Boys.: Note: The scene in which a sleep deprived Scrooge rigs a canon to blast anybody who opens the vault door, only to absent-mindedly open it himself, causing the canon to fire through the building, and be bounced back by a rubber mattress factory, is lifted from the comic book story, "Terror Of The Beagle Boys" (Walt Disney's Comics and Stories #134, November 1951) by Carl Barks.
37	37	"A Whale of a Bad Time"	Alan Zaslove	Story by : Jymn Magon, Bruce Talkington, and Mark Zaslove; Teleplay by : Anthony Adams	November 3, 1987	138
Part 2 of Catch as Cash Can, As Scrooge tries to deliver his fortune to Macaroon, he experiences an interference in the form of a rogue Navy super-submarine working for Glomgold. Donald is there to help his uncle reclaim his fortune. This episode became famous in Hungary on December 12, 1993, when its broadcast on the national television was suddenly interrupted due to the death of prime minister József Antall. For several minutes there was no explanation, only the TV logo was displayed accompanied by Chopin's Funeral March. Since at the time it was the only tv channel available in the country, the event became a flashbulb memory for a huge number of people watching, still often referred as a generational event from the period after the regime change in Hungary.
38	38	"Aqua Ducks"	Alan Zaslove	Story by : Jymn Magon, Bruce Talkington, and Mark Zaslove; Teleplay by : Michael Keyes	November 4, 1987	139
Part 3 of Catch as Cash Can, After dumping his fortune under the sea, Scrooge, along with Launchpad, Gyro, and Doofus, submerges in order to get it out. There they encounter an underwater race of mermen, the ruins of Atlantis, and a monster named Glubbzilla.
39	39	"Working for Scales"	Terence Harrison	Story by : Jymn Magon, Bruce Talkington, and Mark Zaslove; Teleplay by : Bruce Reid Schaefer	November 5, 1987	140
Part 4 of Catch as Cash Can, Glomgold and the Beagle Boys attempt to make sure Scrooge does not win the contest on his way to Macaroon.
40	40	"Merit-Time Adventure"	Alan Zaslove	Sharman DiVono	November 6, 1987	116
The Nephews, Webby, and Doofus attempt to earn a Junior Woodchuck badge in sailing, while a sea monster is preying on Scrooge's shipping fleet.
41	41	"The Golden Fleecing"	Terence Harrison	Ken Koonce and David Weimers	November 16, 1987	146
After hearing about Launchpad's encounter with several Harpies, Scrooge heads to the Black Sea to seek out the legendary Golden Fleece. However, the fleece is guarded by a Sleepless Dragon.: Note: The episode is based on the comic book story, "The Golden Fleecing" (Uncle Scrooge #12, November 1955.
42	42	"Ducks of the West"	David Block	Richard Merwin	November 17, 1987	4412-037
Scrooge takes the boys to his Texas oil wells which mysteriously dried up. Scrooge enters a sharpshooting competition with local tycoon J.R. Mooing. The boys investigate an abandoned mining town where they are threatened by a ghostly highwayman.
43	43	"Time Teasers"	David Block	Anthony Adams	November 18, 1987	142
Gyro invents a watch that allows anyone to move super fast. But the Beagle Boys want to use it so they can steal Scrooge's money. Things get worse when they all end up traveling to the 17th century and meet pirates.
44	44	"Back Out in the Outback"	David Block	Story by : James A. Markovich; Teleplay by : Richard Merwin	November 19, 1987	143
A swarm of tiny UFOs have attacked Scrooge's Australian sheep and shorn off their wool, so Scrooge heads Down Under to investigate. Making matters worse, Webby gets lost in the wild Outback.
45	45	"Raiders of the Lost Harp"	David Block	Cherie Dee Wilkerson	November 20, 1987	144
Overseeing an archaeological excavation in Troy, Scrooge acquires a magical harp that can determine if someone was lying or not. However, Magica de Spell wants the harp for herself, and so does the harp's guardian: a five-story stone Minotaur.: Notes: This episode's title is a pun on the Indiana Jones film, Raiders of the Lost Ark, which in turn contained tributes to the old Barks stories.
46	46	"The Right Duck"	Terence Harrison	Ken Koonce and David Weimers	November 23, 1987	148
After being fired again by Scrooge, Launchpad enters the space program. He and Doofus accidentally get sent to Mars, where Emperor Ping the Pitiless is planning to attack Earth.
47	47	"Scroogerello"	Terence Harrison	Story by : John Pirillo; Teleplay by : Evelyn Gabai	November 24, 1987	149
While experiencing a fever, Scrooge has an extended dream sequence parodying the fairy tale of Cinderella, with himself in the titular role.
48	48	"Double-O-Duck"	Terence Harrison	Ken Koonce and David Weimers	November 25, 1987	4412-050
Launchpad finds himself masquerading as Bruno Von Beak, an agent for the Foreign Organization of World Larceny, whose leader, Dr. Nogood, wants to wipe out the world's money supply. Parodies numerous James Bond tropes.: Notes: Due to legal issues, the Double-O-Duck concept could not be repeated. Elements of this episode, along with the third season episode, The Masked Mallard, were eventually spun off into Darkwing Duck. In Darkwing Duck, the Foreign Organization of World Larceny would be renamed the Fiendish Organization for World Larceny, and Dr. Nogood was replaced in the latter series by F.O.W.L.'s mysterious "High Command" and several different agents, including their primary operative, a rooster named Steelbeak.; Absent: Huey, Dewey and Louie
49	49	"Luck o' The Ducks"	Terence Harrison	Michael O'Mahony	November 26, 1987	4412-045
After finding a leprechaun in his cargo, Scrooge is led to Ireland, where he believes that he will find a vast fortune of gold. However, the leprechauns will not give it up without a fight.
50	50	"Duckworth's Revolt"	Terence Harrison	Dale Hale	November 27, 1987	4412-053
After being fired by Scrooge from his butler post, Duckworth and the boys are abducted by plant aliens and enslaved aboard their ship along with dozens of other kidnapped aliens.
51	51	"Magica's Magic Mirror"	Steve Clark Vincent Davis	Richard Merwin Tedd Anasti	November 30, 1987	4412-011
51	51	"Take Me Out of the Ballgame"	Steve Clark Vincent Davis	Richard Merwin Tedd Anasti	November 30, 1987	4412-011
Magica uses a pair of magic mirrors to try to get Scrooge's Number One Dime. Duckworth coaches the Junior Woodchucks in a baseball game.
52	52	"Duck To The Future"	Terence Harrison	Ken Koonce and David Weimers	December 1, 1987	4412-052
Magica sends Scrooge into the future, where she has stolen his Number One Dime and taken over his company.
53	53	"Jungle Duck"	Terence Harrison	Story by : Evelyn Gabai, Jymn Magon, and Bruce Talkington; Teleplay by : Judy Zook	December 2, 1987	4412-051
While accompanying Scrooge in his search for silver, Mrs. Beakley encounters a Tarzan-like character who used to be a boy she helped raise as a nanny.
54	54	"Launchpads First Crash"	Terence Harrison	Anthony Adams and Michael Keyes	December 3, 1987	155
Scrooge and Launchpad reminisce on how they first met, and discovered a tribe living at the center of the Earth.: Absent: Huey, Dewey and Louie
55	55	"Dime Enough for Luck"	Terence Harrison	Story by : Jymn Magon, Bruce Talkington, and Mark Zaslove; Teleplay by : Diane Duane	December 4, 1987	4412-057
Magica tricks Gladstone Gander into stealing the Number One Dime for her, and as a result, he is cursed with bad luck.: Absent: Huey, Dewey and Louie
56	56	"Duck in the Iron Mask"	David Block	Don Glut	December 7, 1987	4412-058
Scrooge and the boys take a trip to visit an old friend of his, Count Roy of Monte Dumas. However, unknown to Scrooge, Roy's evil twin Ray rules the county with an iron fist. Based on the French legend of the man in the Iron Mask.
57	57	"The Uncrashable Hindentanic"	David Block	Ken Koonce and David Weimers	December 8, 1987	156
Scrooge makes a bet with Glomgold that he can make money off a blimp called the Hindentanic.
58	58	"The Status Seekers"	Terence Harrison	Story by : Carl Barks; Teleplay by : Jymn Magon	December 9, 1987	4412-059
Seeking respect from other members of Duckburg's elite, Scrooge hunts down a mask he gave away to a Polynesian chief, while the Beagle Boys are hired by an aristocrat to hunt him down and steal the mask.
59	59	"Nothing to Fear"	David Block	Richard Merwin, Patsy Cameron, and Tedd Anasti	December 14, 1987	160
Scrooge, the nephews, Doofus, and Duckworth are intimidated by a cloud that generates their worst fears, conjured by Magica.
60	60	"Dr. Jekyll & Mr. McDuck"	Terence Harrison	Margaret Osborne and Michael Keyes	December 23, 1987	4412-061
Scrooge becomes a victim of Dr. Jekyll's potion which causes him to be obsessive with giving money away. It is up to his nephews to find an antidote before he stays a big spender forever. Against them is the infamous mugger Jack the Tripper. Aiding them is Junior Woodchuck super-sleuth, Shedlock Jones, who is searching for London's master criminal Professor Moody Doody.
61	61	"Once Upon A Dime"	David Block	Story by : Richard Esckilsen; Teleplay by : Ken Koonce and David Weimers	December 24, 1987	4412-062
Scrooge tells the story of how his Number One Dime got his fortune started.
62	62	"Spies in Their Eyes"	David Block	Sharman DiVono and Bruce Reid Schaefer	December 25, 1987	154
A hypnotist brainwashes Donald into giving her a remote control device for a submarine that's Scrooge's companies built for the navy. As a result, Donald is scheduled to be court-martialed unless Scrooge and the boys can clear his name.
63	63	"All Ducks On Deck"	Terence Harrison	Story by : Patsy Cameron and Tom Naugle; Teleplay by : John Semper and Tedd Anasti	December 30, 1987	4412-063
Donald Duck makes up a story about being a Navy hero to his nephews. They stow away at sea and try to make him a hero. Meanwhile, the Phantom Blot is planning to steal a Navy cloaking device and holds Scrooge, Launchpad, and the fishermen of Cat Island as hostages.
64	64	"Ducky Horror Picture Show"	Terence Harrison	Richard Merwin, Patsy Cameron, and Tedd Anasti	December 31, 1987	4412-064
Scrooge finances a meeting house/convention center, which is then used by a group of horror movie-based monsters.
65	65	"Till Nephews Do Us Part"	Terence Harrison	Ken Koonce and David Weimers	January 1, 1988	4412-065
Scrooge is romanced by a billionairess named Millionara Vanderbucks, but as the nephews and Webby find out, she only wants his money.

=== Season 2 (1988–1989) ===
In the wake of the first season and DuckTales' first 65 episodes, Disney announced 30 additional episodes. However, during the second season, the only new DuckTales episodes to air were two television movie specials: "Time Is Money" in syndication (some stations airing it on November 24, others on December 9,) and "Super DuckTales" on NBC's The Magical World of Disney. Like "Treasure of the Golden Suns" before them, "Time Is Money" and "Super DuckTales" premiered in the two-hour television movie format, but would repeat in the series' regular rotation as five-part serials. Specifically, "Time Is Money" was first serialized from February 20–24, 1989, and "Super DuckTales" was first serialized from October 9–13, 1989.

No. overall	No. in series	Title	Directed by	Written by	Original release date	Prod. code
66	1	"Marking Time"	Bob Hathcock	S : Jymn Magon; S/T : Bruce Talkington	November 24, 1988	201
Part 1 of Time Is Money, Scrooge buys one of Glomgold's islands, wherein houses a diamond mine. Upon finding out, Glomgold has the diamond mine blown away from the island. Scrooge, Launchpad, and the nephews go back in time to try to prevent the explosion, but end up going 1 million years back, where they meet Bubba the Caveduck and his pet Triceratops, Tootsie.
67	2	"The Duck Who Would Be King"	Bob Hathcock and Terence Harrison	S : Bruce Talkington; T : Bruce Coville, Len Uhley; S/T : Jymn Magon	November 24, 1988	202
Part 2 of Time Is Money, In their attempt to go back to the present, Scrooge, Launchpad, the nephews, Bubba and Tootsie crash-land in an ancient kingdom terrorized by a tyrant.
68	3	"Bubba Trubba"	Bob Hathcock, James T. Walker, and Jamie Mitchell	S : Jymn Magon and Bruce Talkington; T : Len Uhley	November 24, 1988	203
Part 3 of Time Is Money, Upon their return to the present, Scrooge blames all his financial troubles on Bubba, all the while the Beagle Boys try to capture him.
69	4	"Ducks on the Lam"	James T. Walker	S : Bruce Talkington; T : Len Uhley; S/T : Jymn Magon	November 24, 1988	204
Part 4 of Time Is Money, After the Beagle Boys kick them out of the Money Bin, Scrooge and Bubba have a series of troubles that land them in jail.
70	5	"Ali Bubba's Cave"	James T. Walker	S : Bruce Talkington; T : Doug Hutchinson, Len Uhley; S/T : Jymn Magon	November 24, 1988	205
Part 5 of Time Is Money, As Scrooge, the nephews, and Launchpad try to find a way to pay Glomgold for the aforementioned island, Bubba and Tootsie, having returned to the past, feel lonely and try to return to the present.
71	6	"Liquid Assets"	James T. Walker	David Weimers and Ken Koonce	March 26, 1989	206
Part 1 of Super DuckTales, In order to move his Money Bin after the Beagle Boys secretly change the new freeway route as part of their plan for Ma Beagle's birthday, Scrooge decides to hire an accountant, and Fenton Crackshell gets the job.
72	7	"Frozen Assets"	James T. Walker	S : David Weimers and Ken Koonce; T : Jymn Magon	March 26, 1989	207
Part 2 of Super DuckTales, Gyro builds a giant robot to help guard the Money Bin, but it goes out of control, cutting Scrooge off from the Money Bin. Meanwhile, after accidentally losing the Number One Dime to the Beagle Boys, Fenton makes several attempts to get it back, eventually becoming the cybernetic superhero GizmoDuck (with the suit Gyro built for Scrooge as an alternate means of guarding the Money Bin) but in the process accidentally leaves behind the instruction booklet on how to work the suit.
73	8	"Full Metal Duck"	James T. Walker	David Weimers and Ken Koonce	March 26, 1989	208
Part 3 of Super DuckTales, After narrowly destroying Gyro's giant robot, as well as saving Scrooge's nephews and other hostages from the Beagle Boys, GizmoDuck becomes a sensation with the people of Duckburg – that is, until Ma Beagle finds the instruction booklet and has her smartest son, Megabyte Beagle, make a remote control with which to make him work for them.
74	9	"The Billionaire Beagle Boys Club"	James T. Walker	David Weimers and Ken Koonce	March 26, 1989	209
Part 4 of Super DuckTales, After the Beagles get GizmoDuck to steal Scrooge's fortune for them and land Scrooge in jail, the nephews work to save the day and manage to get hold of the remote control.
75	10	"Money to Burn"	James T. Walker	David Weimers and Ken Koonce	March 26, 1989	210
Part 5 of Super DuckTales, Alien robots invade and steal Scrooge's Money Bin so that it can be melted down to produce more metal. While in pursuit with Scrooge and Launchpad, the robots' leader discovers that Gizmoduck is not an actual robot and exposes his secret identity to Scrooge. In the end, using his brains, Fenton manages to outsmart the leader allowing him to recover the suit and save Scrooge and Launchpad as well as recover the Money Bin. On their way back to Earth, an accident Launchpad causes allows the Money Bin to crash land and end up in its original location.

=== Season 3 (1989–1990) ===
In September 1989, Chip 'n Dale Rescue Rangers joined DuckTales in syndication as a companion series. That fall, 17 of the 20 still-expected episodes first aired. Also, "A DuckTales Valentine" premiered in February 1990 on NBC's The Magical World of Disney.

No. overall	No. in series	Title	Directed by	Written by	Original release date	Prod. code
76	1	"Land of Tra La La"	James T. Walker	S : Carl Barks; T : Doug Hutchinson	September 18, 1989	301
When Scrooge develops an unnatural ailment, Fenton takes him to a place where money is not used. But Fenton's plan backfires when he gets the locals to use bottlecaps as currency.: Note: The episode is based on the comic book story, "Tralla La" (Uncle Scrooge #6, April 1954).
77	2	"Allowance Day"	James T. Walker	T : David Weimers, Ken Koonce; S/T : Alan Burnett	September 19, 1989	303
In order to receive their allowances ahead of time so they can buy a new scooter, the nephews trick Scrooge into believing it is Saturday instead of Friday, resulting in mass confusion worldwide.
78	3	"Bubbeo and Juliet"	James T. Walker	S : Evelyn Gabai; T : Doug Hutchinson	September 20, 1989	304
In this spoof of Romeo and Juliet, Bubba falls in love with the daughter of Scrooge's new neighbors, who have gotten in a feud with Scrooge.
79	4	"The Good Muddahs"	James T. Walker	David Weimers and Ken Koonce	September 21, 1989	305
The Beagle Babes, female cousins of the Beagle Boys, kidnap Webby in ransom for a set of crown jewels.
80	5	"My Mother, The Psychic"	James T. Walker	Alan Burnett	September 22, 1989	302
Fenton's mother suffers a bad shock when trying to get better television reception. Her new-found psychic abilities are soon exploited by Scrooge, much to Fenton's chagrin.: Absent: Huey, Dewey and Louie
81	6	"Metal Attraction"	James T. Walker	S : Cliff MacGillivray; T : Alan Burnett, David Weimers, and Ken Koonce	November 2, 1989	307
A robot maid built by Gyro falls in love with GizmoDuck.
82	7	"Dough Ray Me"	James T. Walker	S : Brooks Wachtel; T : Gordon Bressack	November 3, 1989	4305-021
Inflation shoots up the roof when duplicating coins caused by the nephews spread through Duckburg.
83	8	"Bubba's Big Brainstorm"	James T. Walker	S : Evelyn Gabai; S/T : Mark Seidenberg	November 6, 1989	4305-020
Bubba's grades are deplorable, so the nephews use one of Gyro's latest inventions to increase his IQ, but they all soon become annoyed with the new Bubba.
84	9	"The Big Flub"	James T. Walker	David Weimers and Ken Koonce	November 7, 1989	4305-024
Fenton shoots a series of test commercials, but mistakenly creates demand for a nonexistent product. In desperation, he uses a new bubble gum invented by Gyro, who has not had time to test for side effects. While successful at first, it becomes a problem when it is causing people to float in the air.
85	10	"A Case of Mistaken Secret Identity"	James T. Walker	Alan Burnett	November 8, 1989	313
Scrooge's nephews are trying to figure out just who Gizmoduck's secret identity is. So far, their predictions all point to Launchpad McQuack.
86	11	"Blue Collar Scrooge"	Jamie Mitchell and James T. Walker	David Weimers and Sam Locke	November 9, 1989	311
While planning to sell one of his factories off to a business rival, Scrooge suffers a case of amnesia, during which he protests at a factory against himself from the terrible working conditions and dates Fenton's mother. Meanwhile, to prevent Scrooge's business enterprise from falling apart before his disappearance becomes known, Fenton is forced to impersonate Scrooge and complete the sale of the factory, unaware that it is the one where the amnesiac Scrooge is at.
87	12	"Beaglemania"	James T. Walker	Mark Seidenberg	November 10, 1989	310
The Beagle Boys become the latest music sensation in Duckburg, much to Scrooge's chagrin.
88	13	"Yuppy Ducks"	James T. Walker and Jamie Mitchell	David Weimers and Ken Koonce	November 13, 1989	4305-016
The nephews makes business decisions in Scrooge's name while Scrooge is in the hospital.
89	14	"The Bride Wore Stripes"	Jamie Mitchell	S : David Weimers and Ken Koonce; T : George Atkins	November 14, 1989	4305-026
Ma Beagle pretends that she is married to Scrooge in order to inherit his fortune.
90	15	"The Unbreakable Bin"	James T. Walker	S : Carl Barks; T : Alan Burnett	November 15, 1989	315
Scrooge acquires a special glass from Gyro that makes the Money Bin invulnerable to attack, which puts Gizmoduck out of a job. Nothing, not even Magica's most powerful spells can break through. That is, unless she were to acquire a bird that can shatter the glass with an ear-piercing shriek, to which Scrooge will need Gizmoduck to help stop her.
91	16	"Attack of the Fifty-Foot Webby"	James T. Walker and Jamie Mitchell	S : Alan Burnett; S/T : Mark Seidenberg	November 16, 1989	316
Webby, who has been feeling overlooked, ends up becoming a giant after falling into a mysterious pool in the jungle. While she is the center of attention, she does not like it very much. While Scrooge searches for a way to reverse the process, a corrupt circus owner seeks to kidnap Webby for his new sideshow.
92	17	"The Masked Mallard"	James T. Walker and Jamie Mitchell	Len Uhley	November 17, 1989	318
Scrooge decides to become a vigilante after an unflattering report on him airs on television by a sleazy reporter. He is soon framed by a villain impersonating him and unmasked by Gizmoduck, unaware his doppelganger is actually the reporter who smeared him in the first place.: Notes: Elements of this episode, along with the first season episode, Double-O-Duck, would eventually be spun off into Darkwing Duck. Scrooge's mannerisms and equipment as the Masked Mallard are meant to, in part, resemble those of Batman.
93	18	"A Duck Tales' Valentine"	Mircea Mantta	Len Uhley	February 11, 1990	4305-034
Scrooge acquires magical love arrows that once belonged to a goddess.

=== DuckTales the Movie: Treasure of the Lost Lamp (1990) ===
DuckTales the Movie: Treasure of the Lost Lamp is a feature film based on DuckTales. It was released by Walt Disney Pictures on August 3, 1990. It was produced by the Disney Television Animation studios, Walt Disney Animation France and DisneyToon Studios, and not by Walt Disney Feature Animation.

Title	Directed by	Written by	Original release date
DuckTales the Movie: Treasure of the Lost Lamp	Bob Hathcock	Alan Burnett	August 3, 1990
Scrooge McDuck and his nephews Huey, Dewey and Louie travel to Egypt in search of a magic lamp, which is coincidentally the evil sorcerer Merlock and his sidekick Dijon's object of desire.

=== Season 4 (1990) ===
On September 10, 1990, The Disney Afternoon started airing, with DuckTales included as part of its lineup and takes place after the events of DuckTales the Movie: Treasure of the Lost Lamp. "Ducky Mountain High", "The Duck Who Knew Too Much", and "Scrooge's Last Adventure" were produced for season three, but did not air until season four.

No. overall	No. in series	Title	Directed by	Written by	Original release date	Prod. code
94	1	"Ducky Mountain High"	James T. Walker	Rich Fogel, David Weimers, and Ken Koonce	September 10, 1990	4305-029
Scrooge meets up with Glittering Goldie again in order to acquire land filled with golden trees from her. However, Glomgold also wants that land.
95	2	"Attack of the Metal Mites"	Rick Leon	Jeffrey Scott	September 18, 1990	4305-035
Glomgold's scientists create metal-eating mutant insects that he intends to use to wipe out Scrooge's fortune. The bugs devour the Gizmoduck suit, so Fenton must find the confidence to stop the metal mites without it.
96	3	"The Duck Who Knew Too Much"	Terence Harrison	Doug Hutchinson	September 26, 1990	4305-031
Fenton uncovers an international conspiracy to steal Scrooge's gold overseas while supposedly on vacation.: Absent: Huey, Dewey and Louie
97	4	"New Gizmo-Kids on the Block"	Rick Leon	Jeffrey Scott	November 5, 1990	4305-036
Fenton's mother accidentally shrinks the GizmoDuck suit, and the child-size suit ends up in the hands of Scrooge's nephews.
98	5	"Scrooge's Last Adventure"	Jeff Hall and Richard Trueblood	David Weimers and Ken Koonce	November 17, 1990	4305-033
When Scrooge loses his money due to a computer bug, he and Fenton travel through cyberspace to get it back.
99	6	"The Golden Goose" (Part 1)	Rick Leon	S : Ken Koonce, David Weimers, and Alan Burnett; T : Jeffrey Scott	November 27, 1990	4305-038
Dijon joins the Brotherhood of the Goose, a group dedicated to protecting the Golden Goose (a goose that can turn anything to gold), led by his brother Poupon. Dijon "borrows" it, but accidentally loses it to Scrooge, who soon discovers its secret but then loses it to the Beagle Boys, whom Glomgold has sent to get it.
100	7	"The Golden Goose" (Part 2)	Rick Leon	S : Ken Koonce, David Weimers, and Alan Burnett; T : Jeffrey Scott	November 28, 1990	4305-039
Scrooge, Launchpad, Dijon, and Poupon try to retrieve the Golden Goose from Glomgold and the Beagles before it can set off its transformations that can bring forth the end of the world.

== See also ==
- Darkwing Duck
- Quack Pack
