= Breez Evahflowin' =

American rapper

- Born: Enrique DaSilva; December 19, 1975 (age 50); New York City, New York, U.S.
- Genres: Hip hop
- Occupation: Rapper
- Years active: 1996-present
- Label: Domination Recordings

Enrique DaSilva, better known by his stage name Breez Evahflowin, is a rapper based in New York. He is a founding member of the Stronghold rap collective. He was crowned the national grand champion of the Blaze Battle competition in 1999 sponsored by HBO and was 5 week battle champion on Yo! MTV Raps.

He released his own independent solo 12-inch single, "Forsaken", in 1996, which appeared on the Barely Breaking Even compilation album Hip-Hop Forever (1998) by DJ/producer Kenny Dope. He recorded singles for an assortment of different indie labels, including the Boston-based Detonator Records, as well as contributing a slew of guest appearances on records and tours. During his tenure, he has worked with several underground rap artists including Vast Aire, Immortal Technique, Slug, Chali 2na, and Molemen.

== Discography ==
Albums

- Fly (2006)
- Troublemakers (2008) (with Dirt E. Dutch)
- Breez Deez Treez (2009)
- As He Goes On... (2010)

EPs

- Pro-Files: The EP (2000)
- The Mic and the Music (2004) (with Eric Krasno)

Singles

- "Forsaken" (1996)
- "I Heard It" (1997)
- "Refined" (1999)
- "Between Dah Seams" (2001)
- "Don't Stop" (2001)
- "Gimmie Mine" (2001)
- "Grown Men" (2002) (with Akrobatik)
- "Give It Away" (2003)
- "When You Fall" (2009)

Guest appearances

- Akrobatik - "Ruff Enuff (Re-Mix)" from The EP (2000)
- Molemen - "Challenge Me" from Ritual of The... (2001)
- DJ JS-1 & Dub-L - "Dr_gs in My Vein" from Ground Original (2002)
- Brycon & Equal - "Samurai Code" from World's Deadliest Assassin Part II (2004)
- DJ JS-1 - "Flying Guillotines" from Audio Technician (2004)
- Zion I - "Communification" from Politicks: Collabs & B-Sides (2004)
- Vast Aire - "Posse Slash" from Look Mom... No Hands (2004)
- Rob Swift - "Dream" from Wargames (2005)
- C-Rayz Walz - "The Branding Iron" from The Dropping (2006)
- Snowgoons - "No Man's Land" from German Lugers (2007)
- Zimbabwe Legit - "Take Back the Mic" and "Take Back the Mic (KHZ Remix)" from House of Stone (2007)
- Expertiz - "Ring of Fire" from Disrupting Nature's Balance (2010)
- Rob Swift - "Principio" and "Ultimo" from The Architect (2010)
- Infinito 2017 - "Eyewitness to Dopeness" from We Are Dark (2010)
- Dumi Right - "What They Want (Remix)" and "What They Want (Burn Rubber Remix)" from Connect the Dots (2012)
- Atari Blitzkrieg - "Death from Above" from Technicolor Crime Scenes (2013)
- Josh Blake - "Let It Breathe" from Unemployment Benefits Vol. 1 (2020)
