= National Association of Broadcasters =

United States media lobby group

- Tax ID no.: 53-0114600
- Legal status: 501(c)(6)
- Location: Washington, D.C., United States
- President: Curtis LeGeyt
- Revenue: ▲$92,404,239 (2020)
- Website: www.nab.org

The National Association of Broadcasters (NAB) is a trade association and lobby group representing the interests of commercial and non-commercial over-the-air radio and television broadcasters in the United States. The NAB represents more than 8,300 terrestrial radio and television stations as well as broadcast networks.

As of 2022, the president and CEO of the NAB is Curtis LeGeyt.

== Founding ==
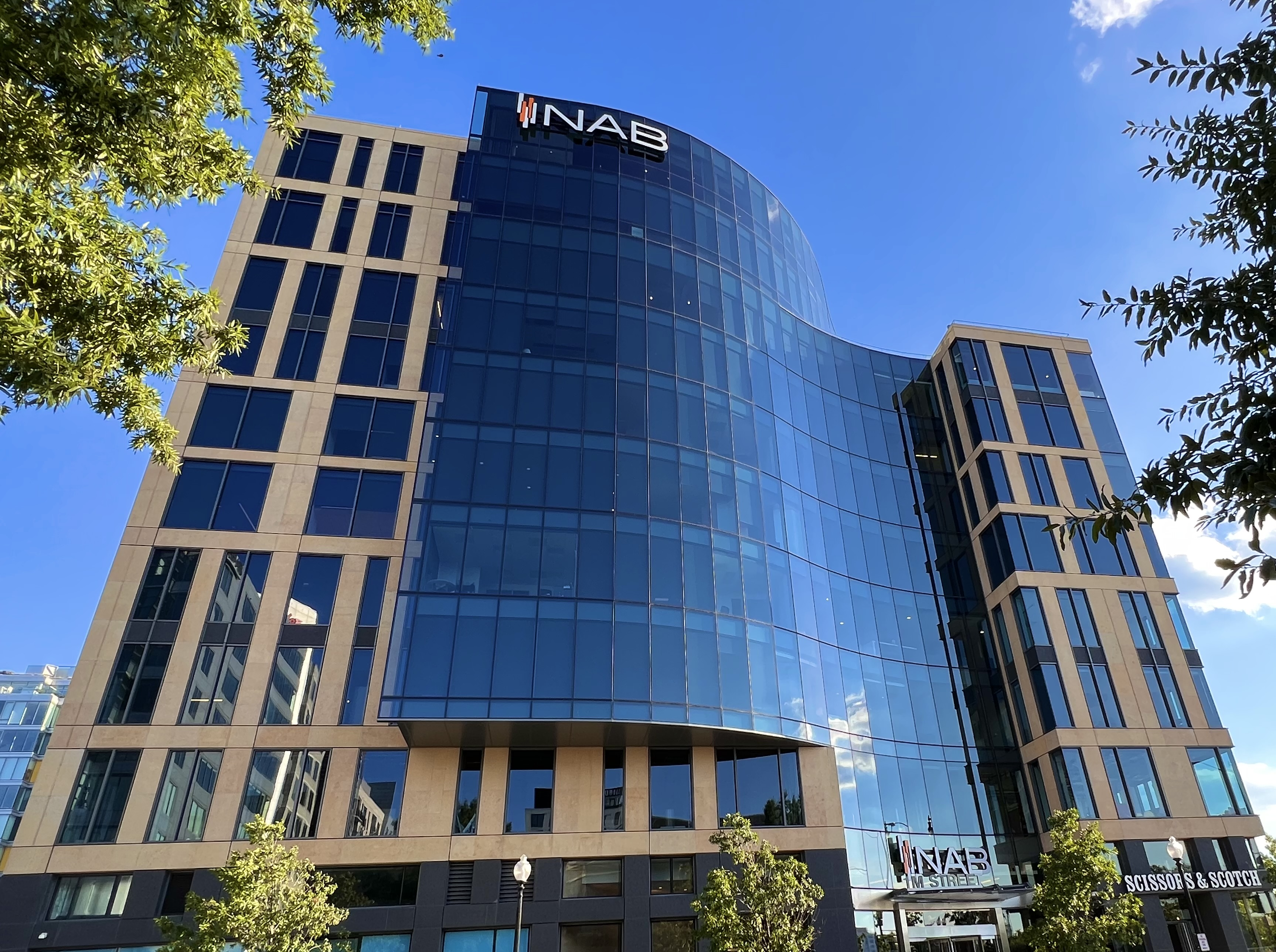
NAB headquarters in Washington, D.C.

The NAB was founded as the National Association of Radio Broadcasters (NARB) in April 1923 at the Drake Hotel in Chicago. The association's founder and first president was Eugene F. McDonald Jr., who also launched the Zenith corporation. In 1951 it changed its name to the National Association of Radio and Television Broadcasters (NARTB) to include the television industry. In 1958 it adopted its current name, "National Association of Broadcasters".

== Commercial radio ==
The NAB worked to establish a commercial radio system in the United States. The system was set up in August 1928 with the establishment of General Order 40—a radio reallocation scheme by the Federal Radio Commission which awarded the choicest frequencies and broadcast times to the then-emerging commercial radio industry. In the wake of General Order 40, a loose coalition of educators, nonprofit broadcasters, labor unions, and religious groups coalesced to oppose the NAB and their allies through the 1920s and 1930s, and to develop a public, nonprofit, license-funded radio system without commercials (similar to what happened with the BBC). The coalition claimed that the commercial industry would only promote profitable programming, thereby reducing the quality and future potential of radio broadcasting.

Not having the political connections, resources, or publicity of the NAB and the commercial radio industry, the non-profit coalition eventually lost the fight with the passage of the Communications Act of 1934.

The National Independent Broadcasters were formed in 1939 as part of the NAB, to represent stations that were not associated with any network, but the group split off in 1941.

== Satellite radio ==
Many satellite radio enthusiasts have criticized the NAB for lobbying against legislation approvals for those services. The NAB protested the FCC's approval of both satellite radio services in the United States—XM and Sirius—and furthermore criticized the 2008 merger of the two companies, calling the merged company a "potential monopoly".

== Digital transition ==
In 2005, the NAB, together with the Association for Maximum Service Television Stations, Inc. (MSTV), commenced development of a prototype high quality, low cost digital-to-analog converter box for terrestrial digital television reception. The result of this project was a specification for the converter box, which was then adopted by the National Telecommunications and Information Administration as a technical requirement for eligible converter boxes for the Administration's Digital-to-Analog Converter Box Coupon Program.

== White space ==
The NAB has lobbied against the use of white spaces, unused broadcast spectrum lying between broadcast channels, for wireless broadband internet and other digital use. The NAB has claimed that use of white space will interfere with existing broadcast spectrum, even though tests by the Federal Communications Commission at levels far stronger than that being advocated for in policy circles have not supported such claims. Indeed, the FCC has recommended the use of white spaces for broadband and other digital use. In 2011 the NAB funded an advertising campaign titled "The Future of TV", advocating for the private ownership of the spectrum, framed as a threat to free television.

== Free TV campaign ==
In mid-2014, an NAB advertising campaign against a Congressional threat appeared, advocating viewers to defeat a cable-TV lobby.

== Gatherings ==
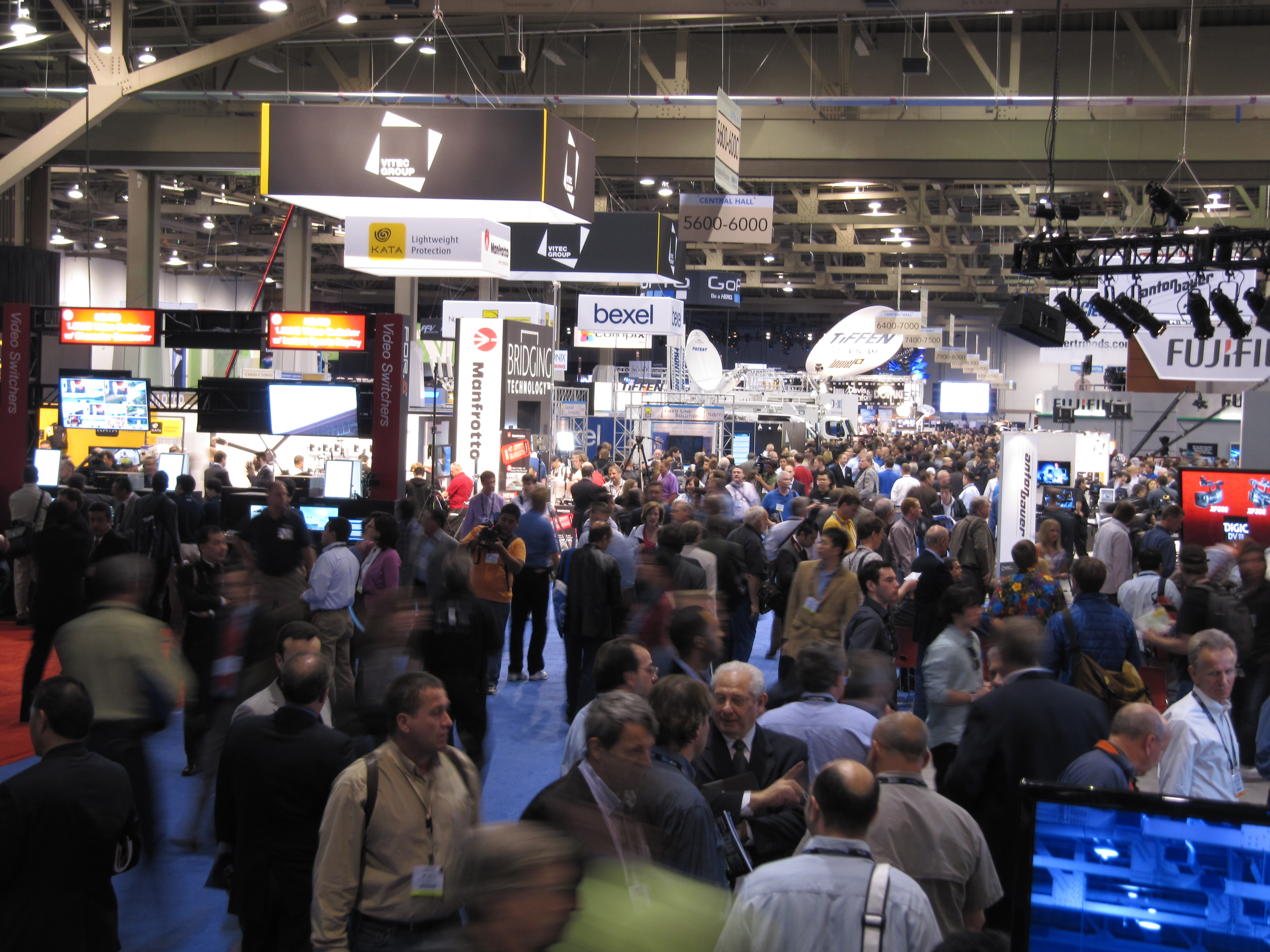
NAB Convention Floor, Las Vegas, 2010

NAB's annual spring convention is the NAB Show. It typically draws over 100,000 industry professionals. NAB also manages the NAB Radio Show which is held each autumn and draws over 3,000 radio professionals. At the 2010 and 2011 NAB shows, popular technology included stereoscopic video and editing software—a demand inspired by James Cameron's Avatar; point-of-view cameras, and DSLR cameras boasting shallow Depth of Field. Other strides in nonlinear editing technology included archival film restoration, digital audio mixing improvements, motion stabilization of hand-held footage and rotoscoping with one click.

The annual NAB Show returned to Las Vegas April 23–27, 2022, after a two-year absence due to the COVID-19 pandemic. Preliminary attendance figures indicated the show attracted more than 50,000 visitors from 155 countries.

== Censorship ==
After the outbreak of World War II in Europe in 1939, the National Association of Broadcasters forced the cancellation of Golden Hour, the radio show of Charles Coughlin.

In 1952, the NAB created the Code of Practices for Television Broadcasters, which banned profanity, the negative portrayal of family life, irreverence for God and religion, illicit sex, drunkenness and biochemical addiction, presentation of cruelty, detailed techniques of crime, the use of horror for its own sake, and the negative portrayal of law enforcement officials, among others. It was enforced by a committee appointed by President of the NAB.

After the courts struck down the Code as unconstitutional in 1983, the NAB board of directors issued a brief "Statement of Principles of Radio and Television Broadcasters" that encourages broadcasters to "exercise responsible and careful judgment" in the selection of material relating to violence, drug abuse, and sex.

On March 1, 2022, the NAB called "on broadcasters to cease carrying any state-sponsored programming with ties to the Russian government" in response to the Russian invasion of Ukraine the week prior.

In May 2024, Film actor Robert De Niro was scheduled to accept a leadership award from the National Association of Broadcasters, but the group rescinded the award after De Niro spoke out against Donald Trump outside the Trump's criminal trial in New York where he was convicted of 34 felonies.

== Hall of Fame inductees ==
Year	Television	Radio
2000	Saturday Night Live	Tom Joyner
2001	Ted Koppel	"Cousin Brucie" Bruce Morrow
2002	Rowan and Martin's Laugh-In	Dick Orkin
2003	Walt Disney anthology television series	Scott Shannon
2004	Roger King	Mormon Tabernacle Choir "Music and the Spoken Word"
2005	The Tonight Show	Jack Buck
2006	Regis Philbin	Dick Purtan
2007	Meet the Press	Rick Dees
2008	Bob Barker	Larry Lujack

== NAB awards ==
The NAB presents several annual awards:

- NAB Marconi Radio Awards, to the country's top radio stations and personalities
- NAB National Radio Award, to an outstanding individual leader in the radio industry
- NAB Crystal Radio Awards, to radio stations achieving excellence in community service
- NAB Engineering Achievement Awards, to an individual for their outstanding accomplishments in the broadcast industry
- NAB Distinguished Service Award, for broadcasters who have made a significant and lasting contribution to American broadcasting.

== Publications ==
- Bruce A. Linton. Self-Regulation in Broadcasting. Washington, D.C.: National Association of Broadcasters, 1967.
- Broadcast Self-regulation, 2nd edn. Washington, D.C.: NAB Code Authority, 1977.
- The Television Code, 22nd edn. Washington, D.C.: NAB Code Authority, 1981.
- Jean Benz, Jane E. Mago, & Jerianne Timmerman, eds. Legal Guide to Broadcast Law and Regulation, 6th edn. Washington, D.C.: National Association of Broadcasters, 2015.

== Similar organizations ==
Organizations similar to the NAB exist in individual U.S. states, including Georgia Association of Broadcasters (GAB) in Georgia, and the Illinois Broadcasters Association (IBA), in Illinois. In Canada, the Canadian Association of Broadcasters (CAB) has a similar role.

== See also ==
- Code of Practices for Television Broadcasters—includes the NAB's Television Code and Seal of Good Practice and enforced from 1952 to 1983.
