= DuckTales (1987 TV series) =

American animated television series

- Also known as: Disney's DuckTales
- Genre: Adventure; Comedy
- Based on: Uncle Scrooge by Carl Barks
- Developed by: Jymn Magon; Tedd Anasti; Patsy Cameron
- Voices of: Alan Young; Russi Taylor; Chuck McCann; Terry McGovern; Frank Welker; Hal Smith; Joan Gerber; Hamilton Camp; June Foray; Peter Cullen; Brian Cummings; Tony Anselmo
- Theme music composer: Mark Mueller
- Opening theme: "DuckTales" by Jeff Pescetto
- Ending theme: "DuckTales" (Instrumental)
- Composers: Ron Jones; Tom Chase; Steve Rucker (additional music, season 1); Various
- Country of origin: United States
- Original language: English
- No. of seasons: 4
- No. of episodes: 100 + 1 film (list of episodes)

Production
- Producers: Jymn Magon (seasons 1–2); Bob Hathcock (seasons 2–4); Alan Zaslove (season 4)
- Running time: 22 minutes
- Production company: Walt Disney Television Animation

Original release
- Network: The Disney Channel
- Release: January 16 – April 10, 1987
- Network: Syndication
- Release: September 18, 1987 – November 28, 1990
- Network: NBC
- Release: March 26 – March 26, 1989

Related
- DuckTales the Movie: Treasure of the Lost Lamp (1990); Darkwing Duck (1991–92); DuckTales (2017–21)

DuckTales is an American animated television series produced by Walt Disney Television Animation. The broadcast began in syndication on September 18, 1987, spanning 100 episodes across 4 seasons, with the final episode airing on November 28, 1990.

Based on Uncle Scrooge and other Duck universe comic books created by Carl Barks, the show follows Scrooge McDuck, his three grandnephews Huey, Dewey, and Louie, and close friends of the group. Most episodes involve various adventures, most of which either involve seeking out treasure or thwarting the efforts of villains seeking to steal Scrooge's fortune or his Number One Dime.

DuckTales has inspired video games, merchandise, and comic books, along with an animated theatrical spin-off film entitled DuckTales the Movie: Treasure of the Lost Lamp, that was released to theaters across the United States on August 3, 1990. It is the first Disney cartoon to be produced for weekday syndication, with its success paving the way for future Disney cartoons, such as Chip 'n Dale: Rescue Rangers and TaleSpin, creating the syndication block The Disney Afternoon. The show's popular theme song was written by Mark Mueller. Launchpad McQuack, a side character, later returns to appear in another Disney animated series, becoming a main character in Darkwing Duck.

In February 2015, Disney XD announced the revival of the show, with the intention of rebooting the series. The rebooted series premiered on August 12, 2017, and concluded on March 15, 2021.

== Premise ==
When Donald Duck decides to join the US Navy, he enlists his uncle Scrooge McDuck to look after his nephews, Huey, Dewey, and Louie. Although he is reluctant to do so due to their hyperactivity, along with his continual pursuit of increasing his wealth and maintaining harsh business ethics, he takes them into his manor. Eventually, he warms up to them upon them proving their skills and brings them on several adventures. Scrooge McDuck is well known for his characteristic Scottish accent, spats, and top hat. We later learn in the series his family comes from Castle McDuck, a large but mysterious castle. He came to America when he was young by creating shoe-shining machines, learning how to "work smarter not harder". In addition to them, the show features frequent appearances by Gyro Gearloose, an established comic book character, as well as guest appearances by Donald in the first season – this was either a full appearance, or in a cameo scene when Scrooge and his nephews read letters he sends to them, and a few minor appearances by Scrooge's old flame, Glittering Goldie, whose character was adapted from the comic books. The show introduced new characters to the Duck universe; while some were minor including the nanny Mrs. Beakley, whom Scrooge hires to babysit the nephews; Mrs. Beakley's granddaughter Webby; Scrooge's pilot Launchpad McQuack; Doofus Drake, an admirer of Launchpad and a close friend of the nephews; and the McDuck Manor butler, Duckworth. The second season later introduced three new additional characters as part of the show's stories: "caveduck" Bubba Duck and his pet triceratops Tootsie; and Fenton Crackshell, Scrooge's personal accountant who secretly works as a superhero named Gizmoduck.

The show's primary villains consist of those from the comics: Flintheart Glomgold, who seeks to replace Scrooge as the "richest duck in the world"; the Beagle Boys, who seek to rob Scrooge of his fortune and often target his money bin; and Magica De Spell, who seeks to steal his Number One Dime. A few changes were made to these villains – unlike the comics, Flintheart is of Scottish descent and wears a couple of pieces of Scottish attire, including a kilt; Magica, who is Italian in the comics, has an Eastern European accent, always saying "darling" (which shocks Scrooge in an episode when Magica changes into the form of Mrs. Beakly). She has a brother named Poe, who was transformed into a raven; the Beagle Boys have individual personalities and are headed by their mother, Ma Beagle, who sometimes springs them from jail to conduct schemes with her, but always avoids being caught by the police. The animated series also featured a list of minor villains, most of whom sought to either claim Scrooge's wealth or beat him to treasure.

Most of the stories used in the show revolve around one of three common themes – the first focuses on the group's efforts to thwart attempts by various villains to steal Scrooge's fortune or his Number One Dime; the second focuses on a race for treasure; the third focused on specific characters within the show. Although some stories are original or based on Barks' comic book series, others are pastiches on classical stories or legends, including characters based on either fictional or historical persons. DuckTales is well noted for its many references to popular culture, including Shakespeare, Jack the Ripper, Greek mythology, Ancient Egypt, James Bond, Indiana Jones, Frankenstein's monster, Dracula, Dinosaurs, Sherlock Holmes and others. After its first season, the show moved away from globe-trotting stories, with adventures focused mainly within Duckburg the city in which it is set.

== Cast ==
- Alan Young as Scrooge McDuck
- Russi Taylor as Huey, Dewey, and Louie Duck and Webby Vanderquack
- Chuck McCann as Duckworth the Butler, Burger Beagle, and Bouncer Beagle
- Terry McGovern as Launchpad McQuack (entire series) and Babyface Beagle (season 1)
- Frank Welker as Bigtime Beagle (entire series), Baggy Beagle (entire series), Poe (season 1), and Bubba (seasons 2–4)
- Hal Smith as Gyro Gearloose and Flintheart Glomgold
- Joan Gerber as Mrs. Bentina Beakley, Glittering Goldie and Additional voices
- Hamilton Camp as Fenton Crackshell/Gizmoduck (seasons 2–4). Additional voices in season 1
- June Foray as Ma Beagle and Magica De Spell
- Peter Cullen as Bankjob Beagle and Admiral Grimitz (season 1)
- Brian Cummings as Doofus Drake and Bugle Beagle (season 1). Additional voices in season 3
- Tony Anselmo as Donald Duck (season 1)

The show also featured a range of additional voice actors who voiced several minor characters, most frequently including the following:

- Susan Blu
- Corey Burton
- Jim Cummings
- Haunani Minn
- Keone Young
- Miriam Flynn
- Kathleen Freeman
- Linda Gary
- Kenneth Mars
- Gregg Berger
- Richard Libertini
- Tress MacNeille
- Howard Morris
- Alan Oppenheimer
- Rob Paulsen
- Will Ryan

== History ==
=== Production ===
Walt Disney Television Animation began production on DuckTales in 1986, intending to have it ready for a premiere in 1987, and its episodes airing within a 4–6 p.m. placement, at a time when more children would be watching television, rather than within a morning timeslot. Seeking to create a cartoon with high quality animation, in comparison with other 1980s cartoons which had much lower budgets, the animation was handled by Wang Film Productions (some 1987 and 1989–1990 episodes only), Cuckoo's Nest Studio, Tokyo Movie Shinsha (season 1 only), and Burbank Films (1 episode only) having previously been used on two other Disney cartoons in 1985 – The Wuzzles and Disney's Adventures of the Gummi Bears – both of which had demonstrated better quality cartoons on TV than in previous years. Although the Japanese provided them with more available artists for the cartoon, this also increased production costs, due to the currency exchange rates between the yen and the dollar, though Disney intended to invest heavily in its DuckTales's production, with plans to recuperate its money by having it syndicated via its syndication unit, Buena Vista Television, with a 2.5/3.5 syndicator/station ad split. While this was a concept that worked well with live-action TV reruns, it had only ever been used with inexpensive cartoon series in the past that either recycled theatrical shorts from decades past or only featured limited, low-budget animation, and thus had never been attempted with a high quality animated series, with the heavy investment considered a risky move.

=== Broadcast ===
The cartoon premiered worldwide between 18 and 20 September 1987 (the time and date varying between markets), with a television movie special entitled The Treasure of the Golden Suns, which was later split up into a five-part serial in future reruns. The first season, aired between 1987 and 1988, consisted of 65 episodes, the "magic number" requirement needed for a show to have weekday syndication (five days a week for thirteen weeks). Disney then commissioned three more seasons – the second season (aired between 1988 and 1989) consisted of two television specials entitled "Time Is Money" and "Super DuckTales", with future reruns splitting them into two five-part serials; the third season (aired between 1989 and 1990) consisted of 18 episodes, with it forming an hour-long syndicated block alongside Chip 'n Dale: Rescue Rangers; and the fourth season (aired during late 1990) consisted of seven episodes (including three unaired episodes meant for the previous season), which was used to form a two-hour-long syndicated block called The Disney Afternoon, consisting of DuckTales and three other half-hour cartoons.

The cartoon continued running within The Disney Afternoon until 1992. Following its departure from the Disney Afternoon, DuckTales reruns remained in syndication until 1995. On April 19, 1997, reruns began airing on ABC's "American Broadcasting Company" Saturday Morning block, up until August 30, 1997. Two days later, on September 1, 1997, Ducktales began reairing again in a new syndication run. Reruns continued on the Disney Channel from October 1995 to 2000, where it was at first part of a new two-hour programming block called "Block Party" that aired on weekday late afternoons, with it returning to syndication between 1997 and 1999. Reruns were later shown on Toon Disney between 1999 and late 2004.

=== Legacy ===
The show proved an immense success for Disney, who decided to commission other cartoons with a similar level of quality, which included Chip 'n Dale: Rescue Rangers, Darkwing Duck, and TaleSpin. In addition, DuckTales also spawned its own feature-length movie, entitled DuckTales the Movie: Treasure of the Lost Lamp, which was released to theaters on August 3, 1990, along with a franchise of merchandising, including toys, comic books and video games, a spin-off series, and eventually a revival in 2017, that rebooted the series. In 1990, the same year the original show ended, Russi Taylor-the voice of regular DuckTales characters Huey, Dewey, Louie, and Webby- obtained more voiceover work outside of Disney when she began providing the voices of some recurring characters on The Simpsons.

== Episodes ==
Season	Episodes	Originally released	
Season	Episodes	First released	Last released
1	65	September 18, 1987	January 1, 1988
2	10	November 24, 1988	March 26, 1989
3	18	September 18, 1989	February 11, 1990
Film		August 3, 1990	
4	7	September 10, 1990	November 28, 1990

== Home media ==
=== VHS releases ===
10 VHS cassettes, containing two episodes each, were released in the United States.

VHS title	Episode(s)	Release date
"Fearless Fortune Hunter"	'Earth Quack' 'Master of the Djinni'	May 31, 1988
"Daredevil Ducks"	'The Money Vanishes' 'Home Sweet Homer'	May 31, 1988
"High-Flying Hero"	'Hero for Hire' 'Launchpad's Civil War'	May 31, 1988
"Masked Marauders"	'Send in the Clones' 'Time Teasers'	October 4, 1988
"Lost World Wanderers"	'Dinosaur Ducks' 'The Curse of Castle McDuck'	May 9, 1989
"Duck to the Future"	'Duck to the Future' 'Sir Gyro de Gearloose'	May 9, 1989
"Accidental Adventurers"	'Jungle Duck' 'Maid of the Myth'	September 28, 1989
"Seafaring Sailors"	'Sphinx for the Memories' 'All Ducks on Deck'	September 28, 1989
"Raiders of the Lost Harp"	'Raiders of the Lost Harp' 'The Pearl of Wisdom'	August 14, 1990
"Space Invaders"	'Where No Duck Has Gone Before' 'Micro Ducks from Outer Space'	August 14, 1990

Also, the episode "Ducky Horror Picture Show" was released with the Goof Troop episode "FrankenGoof" on a VHS cassette entitled Monster Bash in 1993.

==== UK, Australia and New Zealand VHS releases ====
10 VHS cassettes, each containing two or three episodes, were released in the United Kingdom, Australia and New Zealand.

VHS title	Episode(s)	Release date
"Earthquack"	'Earth Quack' 'Back to the Klondike'	September 11, 1992
"Micro Ducks from Outer Space"	'Micro Ducks from Outer Space' 'Scrooge's Pet'	September 11, 1992
"The Lost Crown of Genghis Khan"	'The Lost Crown of Genghis Khan' 'The Money Vanishes'	September 11, 1992
"1001 Arabian Ducks"	'Master of the Djinni' 'Merit-Time Adventure'	September 11, 1992
"High Sea Adventures"	'Maid of the Myth' 'Send in the Clones'	September 11, 1992
"Hotel Strangeduck"	'Hotel Strangeduck' 'Superdoo!'	September 11, 1992
"Fool of the Nile"	'Sphinx for the Memories' 'Top Duck' 'Much Ado About Scrooge'	September 10, 1993
"Little Duckaroos"	'Ducks of the West' 'Magicia's Shadow War' 'Sir Gyro De Gearloose'	September 10, 1993
"Jailhouse Duck"	'Where No Duck Has Gone Before' 'Duckman of Aquatraz' 'Home Sweet Homer'	September 10, 1993
"Runaway Robots"	'Robot Robbers' 'Sweet Duck of Youth'	September 10, 1993

=== DVD releases ===
==== North America (Region 1) ====
Walt Disney Studios Home Entertainment has released the complete series on DVD; four volumes have been released in Region 1 featuring all 100 episodes of the series in its original NTSC format. The first was released on November 8, 2005 (containing episodes 1–27), the second on November 14, 2006 (containing episodes 28–51), and the third volume on November 13, 2007 (containing episodes 52–75). The fourth and final volume was released as a Disney Movie Club exclusive on September 11, 2018 (containing episodes 76–100). The first three volumes were packaged in a box containing 3 slipcases, one for each. The 2013 re-releases of the first three volumes packages the discs into one DVD case. 99 out of 100 episodes are available for purchase on iTunes and Amazon as well (the episode "Sphinx for the Memories" is not available).

DuckTales: Destination Adventure!, a DVD compilation release of episodes from the 2017 reboot, contains two episodes from the original series as bonus features: "New Gizmo Kids on the Block" and "Ducky Mountain High". These episodes were available before their inclusion in the Volume 4 release.

The episodes are in the order that they originally aired (except for the five-part serial "Treasure of the Golden Suns", placed at the beginning of Volume 2). None of the DVD sets contain any special features.

DuckTales home video releases
Season		Episodes	Release dates
Season		Episodes	Region 1
1	1987–88	65	Volume 1: November 8, 2005; Episodes: "Send in the Clones" – "Micro Ducks from Outer Space" Volume 2: November 14, 2006; Episodes: "Don't Give Up the Ship" – "Too Much of a Gold Thing" • "Back to the Klondike" – "Take Me Out of the Ballgame" Volume 3: November 13, 2007; Episodes: "Duck to the Future" – "Till Nephews Do Us Part" 4-Pack Collection (Volumes 1-3 + Treasure of the Lost Lamp): January 20, 2019; Episodes: Entire season featured
2	1988–89	10	Volume 3: November 13, 2007; Episodes: Entire season featured 4-Pack Collection (Volumes 1-3 + Treasure of the Lost Lamp): January 20, 2019; Episodes: Entire season featured
3	1989	18	Volume 4: September 11, 2018 (Disney Movie Club exclusive); Episodes: Entire season featured
4	1990	7	DuckTales (2017): Volume 2: Destination: Adventure: June 5, 2018; Episodes: "Ducky Mountain High" • "New Gizmo-Kids on the Block" Volume 4: September 11, 2018 (Disney Movie Club exclusive); Episodes: Entire season featured

==== International (Region 2) ====
In the United Kingdom and Europe, Disney released one Region 2 volume in 2007, titled DuckTales First Collection. Despite the set being similar to the North American version, the DVD contained only 20 episodes, while having 5 language tracks: English, French, German, Spanish and Italian. Other regional versions were distributed to other countries, but only going up to episode #20. On November 12, 2012, the UK received two further releases of Collection 2 and Collection 3, being a Region version of the 2nd and 3rd volumes from North America. Unlike the first release, these 3-disc sets include a Disney's FastPlay mode, and only four language tracks: English, Dutch, German and French, but subtitles have not been added. The packaging is adjusted regionally (artwork, language, age certification stamps), but all sets appear to contain identical content.

Episodes 26–32 are missing from the European PAL DVDs ("The Curse of Castle McDuck", "Launchpad's Civil War", "Sweet Duck of Youth", "Earth Quack", "Home Sweet Homer", "Bermuda Triangle Tangle", "Micro Ducks from Outer Space"). In the US NTSC release, these were included in the first collection (27 episodes). There are currently no plans to release the rest of the series, or the seven episodes missing between the first two sets.

DVD title	Ep #	Release date	Language
Ducktales – 1st Collection	20	February 12, 2007	English, French, German, Spanish and Italian
Ducktales – 2nd Collection	24	November 12, 2012	English, Dutch, German and French
Ducktales – 3rd Collection	24	November 12, 2012	English, Dutch, German and French

==== Hindi language (Region 2, 4, 5) ====
In India, where DuckTales was dubbed in Hindi for TV broadcast on Doordarshan and syndication on Star Plus, 60 out of the first 70 episodes from Seasons 1 and 2 were released by Sony DADC India under license from Disney India, on 20 DVD volumes and video CDs in PAL format. These discs support Regions 2, 4 and 5. However, due to the limited number of copies, they quickly went out of stock. Each DVD contains 3 episodes encoded at a bit rate of 8000 kbit/s. Episodes 8, 10, 11, 22, 23, 24, 36, 55, 61 and 70 to 100 are missing from the released set and are yet to be released in Hindi on DVD.

DVD volume	Episode number	Episodes
Vol. 1	42, 37, 7	Ducks of the West | Catch as Cash Can: A Whale of a Bad Time | Sphinx for the Memories
Vol. 2	38, 43, 44	Catch as Cash Can: Aqua Ducks | Time Teasers | Back Out in the Outback
Vol. 3	39, 45, 49	Catch as Cash Can: Working for Scales | Raiders of the Lost Harp | Luck o' the Ducks
Vol. 4	41, 46, 47	The Golden Fleecing | The Right Duck | Scroogerello
Vol. 5	48, 53, 52	Double-O-Duck | Jungle Duck | Duck To The Future
Vol. 6	50, 62, 54	Duckworth's Revolt | Spies in Their Eyes | Launchpad's First Crash
Vol. 7	57, 56, 58	The Uncrashable Hindentanic | The Duck in the Iron Mask | The Status Seekers
Vol. 8	59, 60, 63	Nothing To Fear | Dr. Jekyll & Mr. McDuck | All Ducks on Deck
Vol. 9	64, 65, 66	Ducky Horror Picture Show | Till Nephews Do Us Part | Time Is Money: Marking Time
Vol. 10	67, 68, 69	Time Is Money: The Duck Who Would Be King | Time Is Money: Bubba Trubba | Time Is Money: Ducks on the Lam
Vol. 11	33, 29, 28	Back to the Klondike | Earth Quack | Sweet Duck Of Youth
Vol. 12	32, 35, 18	Micro Ducks from Outer Space | Scrooge's Pet | Dinosaur Ducks
Vol. 13	16, 14, 25	The Money Vanishes | Lost Crown Of Genghis Khan | Pearl of Wisdom
Vol. 14	12, 51, 21	Master of the Djinni | Magica's Magic Mirror and Take Me Out of the Ballgame | Maid of the Myth
Vol. 15	19, 9, 17	Hero for Hire | Armstrong | Sir Gyro de Gearloose
Vol. 16	40, 31, 34	Merit-Time Adventure | Bermuda Triangle Tangle | Horse Scents
Vol. 17	26, 6, 20	The Curse of Castle McDuck | Send in the Clones | Superdoo!
Vol. 18	13, 27, 1	Hotel Strangeduck | Launchpad's Civil War | Treasure Of The Golden Suns: Don't Give Up The Ship
Vol. 19	2, 3, 15	Treasure of the Golden Suns: Wronguay In Ronguay | Treasure of the Golden Suns: Three Ducks Of The Condor | Duckman of Aquatraz
Vol. 20	30, 4, 5	Home Sweet Homer | Treasure Of The Golden Suns: Cold Duck | Treasure Of The Golden Suns: Too Much Of A Gold Thing

=== Video on demand ===
Season One of DuckTales was released on Amazon Video in 2013 and was free for Amazon Prime members but as of February 28, 2014, DuckTales Season 1 is no longer accessible through Amazon Video or Amazon Prime accounts.

As of December 11, 2015, some episodes from Season 1 have been made available on Netflix in Denmark, Finland, Norway, and Sweden. In Denmark, at least, only 20 episodes from season 1 are available on Netflix. The episodes available do follow the correct airdate order but some episodes are simply missing. For instance, the episodes on Netflix do not include a lot of Season 1 episodes, even though they have indeed been dubbed into Danish. Amongst the episodes missing are the Five-Part Miniseries, "Treasure of the Golden Sun", "Duckman of Aquatraz", and "Top Duck".

The entire series is currently available for purchase on Amazon Instant Video in Germany, with the episodes split into eight different seasons.

iTunes and Amazon Instant Video in the United States currently offer the entire series (except the episode "Sphinx for the Memories") for purchase in SD format, split into six volumes at $9.99 per volume.

The series has been available to stream on Disney+ since its launch on November 12, 2019, however some episodes are out of order and the episodes "Sphinx for the Memories" and "Launchpad's Civil War" are missing.

== Theme song ==
"DuckTales Theme"
The last line of the first verse and the chorus of the DuckTales theme song, written by Mark Mueller and sung by Jeff Pescetto, as taken from the full-length studio version. The song has been well-received for its "earworm" qualities.

The series theme song was written by Mark Mueller, an ASCAP award-winning pop music songwriter who later wrote the theme song to Chip 'n Dale Rescue Rangers; Mueller was paid a little over $1,250 to write the tune. An article in Vanity Fair details Mueller's writing of the song and is titled "History's Catchiest Single Minute of Music."

Time magazine named the song one of the "Top 10 Cartoon Theme Songs."

The DuckTales Theme was sung by Jeff Pescetto. There are four different versions of the theme song. The original version, serving as the show's opening theme, contained one verse, chorus, bridge, and then a chorus. A shorter version of the opening theme was used in The Disney Afternoon lineup with the line, "Everyday they're out there making Duck Tales, woo-ooh", taken out. The original version also appeared both at the start of the end credits for Treasure of the Lost Lamp and as an instrumental version towards the end of them.

A full-length version of the theme song was released on the Disney Afternoon soundtrack, the third volume (which was released in a set with the other two volumes) in The Music of Disney: a Legacy in Song along with the full TaleSpin theme and in the November 2013 release of the Disney Classics collection. Also, it is heard in the end credits of DuckTales: Remastered and is also released on its official soundtrack.

The full version contains a second verse, and it includes a guitar solo, which is performed with a wah-wah pedal to make it sound like duck-like noises. It also has a fadeout ending, unlike the other versions. There is also a rare extended version that was used in the read-along cassettes in 1987. It has a sequence order of verse-chorus-bridge-chorus-instrumental break-chorus.

According to an interview conducted with Jeff Pescetto in 2009, he was originally approached by Mark Mueller to cut a demo version of the theme song for Disney's approval. Although they were impressed with Pescetto's demo, Disney had decided at first to hire pop group The Jets to perform the theme song for broadcast. However, after recording a version with the group, Disney felt that the theme song needed a different vocal style, and instead commissioned Pescetto to perform the theme. After performing on DuckTales, Pescetto would later be asked to sing the vocal themes for Chip 'n Dale Rescue Rangers (composed by Mueller and produced by Alf Clausen), Darkwing Duck (composed by Steve Nelson and Thom Sharp and produced by Steve Tyrell), and for The Disney Afternoon itself. The Jets, meanwhile, later performed a full-length version of the Rescue Rangers theme song in a music video aired on The Disney Channel in 1989.

== Music ==
Episode musical scores and background cues were principally written by Ron Jones, who composed and conducted an extensive library of cues to be reused throughout the series beginning with his score for the episode "Armstrong". In contrast to how other composers were creating a "patronizing" and "cute" score for the show, Jones says he composed the music with regard to the audience and their intelligence. "I would not play the score like a kid's show at all. If (the characters) went on an adventure I would play it serious like Raiders of the Lost Ark." Jones' score for DuckTales has received critical acclaim from fans of the series.

Other musicians who worked on the series included Thomas Chase and Steve Rucker, who were credited (as Thomas Chase Jones and Stephen Rucker, respectively) for scoring the episode "Dinosaur Ducks" under the notation "Additional Music".

On January 27, 2026, Intrada Records released a two-CD set featuring selections from Ron Jones's score. This marks the first time that DuckTales has seen an official soundtrack release apart from its theme music.

== Reception ==
=== Critical reception ===
Maximilian Leunig of Collider wrote, "This classic series brought along characters that hadn't been in much media apart from comic books, notably written by Carl Barks and Don Rosa. Among these were famous villains like Magica De Spell, the Beagle Boys, and Flintheart Glomgold, to allies like Gyro Gearloose and Glittering Goldie. Of course, the show also created beloved partners like Launchpad McQuack, Gizmoduck, and Webby, who all brought fun and adventure to this Disney classic." Emily Ashby of Common Sense Media rated the show a 4 out of 5 stars, stating, "DuckTales was a huge hit with fans during its four-year run in the '80s and continues to entertain today with quality stories, wild adventures, and classic Disney characters such as Scrooge McDuck and the dynamic trio of Huey, Dewey, and Louie. Because the stories often are set in far-flung places such as Greece, Antarctica, and the Klondike, kids are introduced to basic concepts of geography and diverse world cultures."

Jeremy Hayes of BuzzFeed ranked DuckTales 2nd in their "Best Cartoons From The '80s" list, saying, "Arguably the greatest Disney cartoon show ever, the animation and voice acting really stand out (from what I've seen of this show). Often considered one of the most underrated cartoons ever, the show ran for four seasons after debuting in September of 1987." In January 2009, IGN listed DuckTales as the 18th best show in the Top 100 Best Animated TV Shows, writing, "This was Disney's first syndicated animated TV series and it paved the way for other hugely successful shows like TaleSpin and Chip n' Dale Rescue Rangers. It even created two spin-offs, Darkwing Duck and Quack Pack. Disney made the smart move of taking classic characters like Scrooge McDuck and Baloo from The Jungle Book and giving them a late '80s reboot."

==== Theme song ====
The theme song, written by Mark Mueller, has been widely regarded as one of the most memorable for a television program, with Dan Fletcher of Time magazine noting its lasting impact despite being just a children's song: "Some of the lyrics might not make sense to those older than the age of 10 — we're not sure how life in Duckburg is like a hurricane, or exactly what a 'duck blur' is — but the DuckTales song is still awesome." An article from Vanity Fair noted that the song has a tendency to stick in someone's head, a phenomenon known as an earworm. TVLine lists the theme song among the best animated series themes of all time.

=== Accolades ===
Year	Award	Category	Results	Refs
1988	Daytime Emmy Awards	Outstanding Animated Program	Nominated	
1988	Kids' Choice Awards	Favorite Cartoon	Nominated	
1989	Daytime Emmy Awards	Outstanding Animated Program	Nominated	
1989	Primetime Emmy Awards	Outstanding Animated Programming (for Programming One Hour or More) (episode: "Super DuckTales")	Nominated	
1990	Daytime Emmy Awards	Outstanding Film Sound Editing	Won	
2019	Online Film & Television Association Hall of Fame	Television Program	Won	

== Theatrical film ==
DuckTales the Movie: Treasure of the Lost Lamp was released nationwide in the United States on August 3, 1990, by Walt Disney Pictures and Disney MovieToons, Disney TV Animation division and Disney France. The film follows Scrooge McDuck and his nephews as they try to defeat the evil warlock Merlock from taking over the legendary magic lamp.

The film received a mixed to positive reception by critics and audiences, but was considered a financial disappointment by Disney and several planned sequels were abandoned as a result.

== Reboot ==
In February 2015, Disney XD announced a reboot of the original DuckTales TV series. It premiered on August 11, 2017 and ran for three seasons.

In May 2015, Terry McGovern (the original voice of Launchpad McQuack) stated on Facebook that the entire voice cast would be replaced, stating he felt "heartsick" at the news.

== Merchandise ==
=== Video and computer games ===
A DuckTales video game was developed by Capcom and released for the Nintendo Entertainment System and Game Boy in 1989. A sequel to the game, DuckTales 2, was released for NES and Game Boy in 1993. A Disney's DuckTales hand-held LCD game from Tiger Electronics was also released in 1990. A DuckTales mobile game was developed by Artefact Games and published by Disney Mobile and released for Mobile Phones on 2011 in Moscow.

A different platform game, DuckTales: The Quest for Gold, was released by Incredible Technologies for computers in 1990. DuckTales: Remastered, an HD remake of Capcom's original game, developed by WayForward Technologies, was released by Disney Interactive for PlayStation Network, Nintendo eShop and Steam on August 13, 2013. It was also released on September 11, 2013, for Xbox Live Arcade. A retail copy for PlayStation 3 was released on August 20, 2013, with a code to download the game and a DuckTales collector pin.

Various DuckTales items appear in the Toy Box of the Disney Infinity franchise. In 1.0, the Money Bin item and Scrooge and Beagle Boy townspeople appear in addition to the "Scrooge's Lucky Dime" power disc. In 2.0, Scrooge's pile of money and a Scrooge portrait are interior items in addition to the iOS-exclusive "Scrooge's Top Hat" power disc. In 3.0, a Launchpad McQuack townsperson was added.

Launchpad was a selectable character for the mobile game titled Disney Snow Sports in 2007.

An app was released by Disney in the late summer/early fall of 2013 called DuckTales: Scrooge's Loot, where the player tries to get Scrooge back his money that was stolen by Flintheart Glomgold, Magica de Spell, and the Beagle Boys.

Scrooge McDuck, Launchpad McQuack, Webby Vanderquack, Magica De Spell, and Gizmoduck appeared in Disney Emoji Blitz.

Scrooge McDuck, Huey, Dewey, Louie, and Webby appear as playable characters as part of a DuckTales collection in the video game Disney Magic Kingdoms, along with The Money Bin and The Golden Condor as attractions.

In 2019, the original characters of the series Gizmoduck and Launchpad McQuack were added to Disney Heroes: Battle Mode as playable characters.

=== Books ===
DuckTales releasing on the Picture Books from the part of Disney Gold and was Published by Kodansha.

=== Comic books and trade paperbacks ===
==== DuckTales ====
DuckTales had two series of comic books. The first series was published by Gladstone Publishing and ran for 13 issues from 1988 to 1990, and the second series was published by Disney Comics and ran for 18 issues from 1990 to 1991. Disney also published a children's magazine based on the show, which also featured comic stories, one of which was written by Don Rosa. Subsequent comic stories were also printed in the magazine Disney Adventures from 1990 to 1996.

On August 29, 2007, Gemstone released a trade paperback of Scrooge's Quest and on October 7, 2008, it was followed by The Gold Odyssey; together they collect the majority of the Disney Comics run.

Ducktales: Scrooge's Quest
Ducktales Volume 2 #1–7
Ducktales: The Gold Odyssey
Ducktales Volume 2 #9–15

Walt Disney Treasures
Trade Title	Issue Reprinted
Disney Comics: 75 Years of Innovation (2006)	Ducktales Volume 1 #4
Uncle Scrooge: A Little Something Special (2008)	Ducktales Volume 1 #7

==== Carl Barks' Greatest DuckTales Stories ====
On May 24 and July 19, 2006, Gemstone published a two-volume trade paperback, Carl Barks' Greatest DuckTales Stories. The trades contain reprints of stories written by Carl Barks which were specifically adapted into television episodes of DuckTales.

Both volumes start with an introduction and compare the original comic story with its DuckTales episode counterpart. Volume 1 also includes a two-page article delving into details on adapting the show from the comic series.

Volume 1
Issue number	Story
Four Color #456	Back to the Klondike
Uncle Scrooge #13	Land Beneath the Ground (The episode was titled "Earthquack")
Uncle Scrooge #65	Micro Ducks from Outer Space
Uncle Scrooge #9	Lemming with the Locket (The episode was titled "Scrooge's Pet")
Uncle Scrooge #14	The Lost Crown of Genghis Khan
Uncle Scrooge #29	The Hound of the Whiskervilles (The episode was titled "The Curse of Castle McDuck")
Volume 2
Issue number	Story
Uncle Scrooge #58	The Giant Robot Robbers (The episode was titled "Robot Robbers")
Uncle Scrooge #12	The Golden Fleecing
Uncle Scrooge #3	The Horseradish Story (The episode was titled "Down and Out in Duckburg")
Uncle Scrooge #41	The Status Seeker
Uncle Scrooge #38	The Unsafe Safe (The episode was titled "The Unbreakable Bin")
Uncle Scrooge #6	Tralla La (The episode was titled "The Land of Tra-La-La")

==== BOOM! Studios revival ====
On February 17, 2011, BOOM! Studios announced that a new DuckTales comic series would begin May 2011 under its BOOM! Kids / Kaboom! imprint. The series was written by Warren Spector (author of the Epic Mickey videogame) with art by Leonel Castellani and Jose Massaroli. It lasted for 6 issues, with the final two crossing over with Darkwing Duck. The BOOM! Studios comic will be reprinted in IDW Publishing's Disney's Afternoon Giant in October 2018.

DuckTales: Rightful Owners
DuckTales #1–4
Darkwing Duck/DuckTales: Dangerous Currency
DuckTales #5–6 and Darkwing Duck #17–18

Before its updated DuckTales comic book, BOOM! Kids (later called Kaboom!) featured internationally produced DuckTales comic book stories never before seen in the US in issues 392–399 of the Uncle Scrooge comic book. These issues, published 2010–2011, were collected into two trade paperback volumes.

Uncle Scrooge in DuckTales: Like a Hurricane
Uncle Scrooge #392–395
Uncle Scrooge in DuckTales: Messes Become Successes
Uncle Scrooge #396–399

== International release ==
The success of DuckTales led to the translation of the show into many languages. Featured together with Chip 'n Dale Rescue Rangers in a Sunday morning program titled Walt Disney Presents, the show premiered in the former Soviet Union in 1991, the first American cartoon shown in the region after the Cold War. One year later, Darkwing Duck was also added to this lineup. However, the show's theme song (written by Mark Mueller and originally sung by Jeff Pescetto) remained in English for several episodes. The first Russian version of the song was replaced midway through the series with an alternate rendition that contained completely different lyrics.

The series screened in New Zealand weekday afternoons on TVNZ. When TV3 started airing in November 1989 they took over the rights to Disney properties previously held by TVNZ, and as a result Ducktales was later repeated on TV3.

The series aired in India on Doordarshan, dubbed in Hindi. The title track for the original series was sung in Hindi by Amit Kumar. The features were dubbed and the episodes have voice cast of Chetan Shasital, Javed Jaffery, Rakshanda Khan and others. In many countries, the theme song was performed by well-known singers (like in Finland, where it was sung by Pave Maijanen).

In Spanish speaking countries of Latin America, the series was called Pato Aventuras (Duck Adventures). Scrooge McDuck is called "Rico McPato" and the nephews were translated as Hugo, Paco, and Luis, keeping the names of the translated vintage cartoons and comic books. In Spain, while the Latin American dub was used for the first broadcast, a high-quality local dub was produced afterward, keeping the local "Gilito/Juanito/Jaimito/Jorgito" names for the characters. In Brazil, the series was called "Duck Tales: os Caçadores de Aventuras" (Duck Tales: the Adventure Hunters).

In Italy, the series was called Avventure di paperi.

In France, the series was called La bande à Picsou (McDuck's gang). The French name of Scrooge McDuck is Balthazar Picsou. Scrooge's last name Picsou comes from a French expression Pique-Sou emphasizing Scrooge's stingy behavior. Huey, Dewey, and Louie are called Fifi, Riri and Loulou.

In Hungary, the term "DuckTales generation" (Kacsamesék generáció) refers to the people who were born in the early to mid-1980s, because the death of József Antall, the first democratically elected Prime Minister of Hungary, was announced during a DuckTales episode in 1993. This was the generation's first encounter with politics.

In Romania, the series was called Povești cu Mac-Mac (Stories with Mac-Mac). Only the episodes 1–65 were dubbed and aired. Scrooge McDuck was dubbed by a well-known actor, Gheorghe Dinică, until his death (only 5 episodes remained after his death). After Gheorghe Dinică's death, Valentin Uritescu dubbed Scrooge (episodes 50, 57, 60, 64, 65). Also, Angela Filipescu provided the voices of Huey, Dewey, and Louie, Tamara Buciuceanu-Botez provides the voice of Ms. Beakley, Mihaela Mitrache was Webbigail along with the great master Cornel Vulpe as Duckworth. The series was broadcast on Prima TV and first aired on TVR1 in 1994 and the dubbing studio who provide the Romanian version is Ager Film. The intro song was performed by a winner from Mamaia Festival, Alin Cibian.

in Iran, this series was broadcast on IRIB Pooya & Nahal from 2018 to 2019 then the 2017 reboot was broadcast on IRIB Pooya & Nahal in 2019 after The DuckTales 1987 series was broadcast in Iran.

In the Philippines, the series was broadcast on GMA Network from 1988 to 1993.
