= NAB Radio Show =

The NAB Radio Show is an annual trade show produced by the National Association of Broadcasters. It takes place in September.

== Show highlights ==
=== 2008 ===
The 2008 NAB Radio Show took place in Austin, TX from September 17–19. NAB President and CEO David Rehr delivered the state of the industry address, which was followed by a keynote address from New York Times Personal Technology Columnist David Pogue. Other keynote speakers included FCC Commissioner Jonathan Adelstein and FCC Chairman Kevin Martin.
