= Television Code =

U.S. television censorship rules (1952–1983)

Seal of Good Practice

Seal of Good Practice as it appeared in 1958

The Code of Practices for Television Broadcasters, also known as the Television Code, was a set of ethical standards adopted by the National Association of Broadcasters (NAB) of the United States for television programming from 1952 to 1983. The code was created to self-regulate the industry in hopes of avoiding a proposed government Advisory Board and satisfying parental concerns over violence and other matters. Prior to the Television Code, the 1935 NAB Code of Ethics for radio was applied to television but fewer than half of television stations subscribed to it; when the Television Code was first issued, two-thirds of stations became subscribers.

== Content ==
The code was first issued on December 6, 1951, and amended multiple times, especially in the wake of the 1950s quiz show scandals, Congressional hearings into violence (1952, 1954), and concern over the possible blurring of fact and fiction in early docudrama.

The code prohibited the use of profanity, the negative portrayal of family life, irreverence for God and religion, illicit sex, drunkenness and biochemical addiction, presentation of cruelty, detailed techniques of crime, the use of horror for its own sake, and the negative portrayal of law enforcement officials, among others. The code regulated how performers should dress and move to be within the "bounds of decency". Further, news reporting was to be "factual, fair and without bias" and commentary and analysis should be "clearly defined as such". Broadcasters were to make time available for religious broadcasting and were discouraged from charging religious bodies for access. Most importantly, it limited the commercial minutes per hour.

In 1973, responding to concerns raised by Action for Children's Television, the NAB revised the code to limit commercial time in children's programming to twelve minutes per hour. Additionally, the hosts of children's television programs were prohibited from appearing in commercials aimed at children. This became Section XIV "Time Standards for Non-Program Material".

== Enforcement ==
The Television Code rules were interpreted, monitored, and enforced by the code authority director, who was appointed by the President of the NAB. The Code Authority interpreted the code by providing advice, publishing guidelines and amendments to clarify code provisions, and issuing rulings on specific programs or commercials, although most cases were resolved through negotiation rather than rulings. The main concern of code staff was commercials, not program content. The Code Authority had three offices in New York, Hollywood, and Washington D.C. and published a monthly newsletter, Code News.

The Television Code provided for suspension and expulsion of subscribers as determined by the NAB Television Code Review Board whose members were subscribers to the code and appointed by the NAB president. The board checked compliance through a system of biannual monitoring backed up by complaint letters coming mostly from competing stations. Appeals of the review board's decisions could be taken to the NAB Television board of directors. Compliance with the code was indicated by the "Seal of Good Practice", displayed during closing credits on most United States television programs, and on some US TV station sign-on and sign-offs from 1952 to circa 1983.

== Elimination ==
In 1976, the code's program standards were suspended after a Los Angeles federal judge ruled that the Family Viewing Hour violated the First Amendment. In 1979, the Carter Justice Department challenged the code's Section XIV time standards limiting advertising on children's programming, alleging that they "represented an unlawful effort to restrict supply of commercial availabilities and hence drive up prices for these spots." They then brought an antitrust action against the NAB. After a summary judgment was handed down against the NAB in 1982 partially striking down Section XIV, the NAB and the Reagan Justice Department entered into a consent decree abolishing the time standards and the industry-wide limitations on the number and length of commercials. Under further threats of legal action by the Justice Department on the grounds the code violated the First Amendment and Fairness Doctrine, the NAB decided to eliminate the remainder of the Television Code as well as the Radio Code in 1983.

== Legacy ==
The code paved the way for the development of the Broadcast Standards and Practices (BS&P) departments of the terrestrial broadcast networks (NBC, CBS, ABC) and most cable networks. After the Television Code's demise and with the burden of self-regulation now falling to networks, the BS&P offices were forced to produce their own written codes which integrated some of the code's concepts, recommendations, and rules.

In October 1990, the NAB board of directors issued a brief "Statement of Principles of Radio and Television Broadcasters" that encourages broadcasters to "exercise responsible and careful judgment in the selection of material for broadcast.”

A scholarly discussion titled "Self-Regulation and the Media" by Angela J. Campbell (1999) examines media self-regulation and concludes that "Applying these five factors to digital television public interest responsibilities and privacy on the Internet, it concludes that self-regulation is not likely to be successful in these contexts."

== See also ==
- Comics Code Authority
- Hays Code
