= Steve Clark (animator) =

American animator and director

Steve Clark is a cartoon animator and director. His first credit was The Dick Tracy Show.
