= Dirt E. Dutch =

American hip hop musician

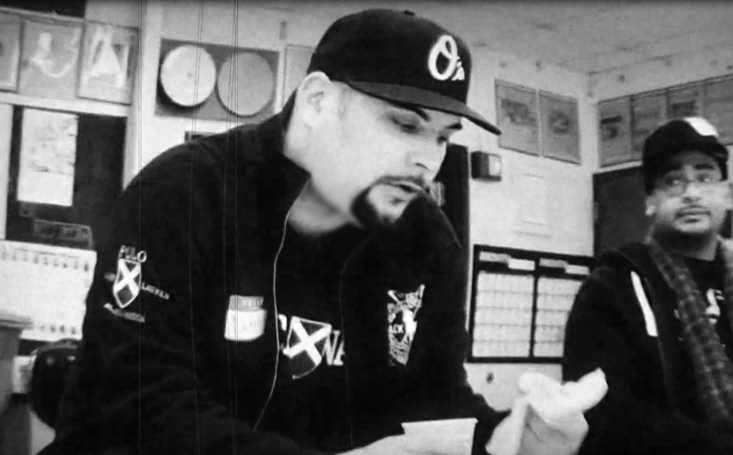
- Dirt E. Dutch on set of video shoot (2010)

Background information
- Born: Eric Bassriel
- Origin: Danbury, Connecticut
- Genre: Hip hop
- Occupations: Record producer, music director, broadcast personality
- Instruments: Sampler, synthesizer, drum machine
- Years active: 2003–present
- Labels: Random Beats, Vibe Music Collective, Little Ax, Domination Recordings

Eric Bassriel, better known as Dirt E. Dutch, is an American hip hop artist from Danbury, Connecticut. He is a host and producer for IndieFeed, one of the first podcast networks on iTunes. As a music producer, he released his first LP with New York rapper Breez Evahflowin in 2008 entitled Troublemakers, which reached as #2 on the CMJ hip hop music charts. In addition to releasing three albums with Breez Evahflowin, he has released two of full-length albums on his own, Hit The Dutchman (2010), and Bars Magica (2011). He has also contributed to a number of releases by others, including Mega Ran, Homeboy Sandman, Cavalier, Vast Aire, Emskee of the Good People, PremRock and Willie Green, and Infinito 2017. Dirt E. Dutch was a major contributor to the Audiowear Project by Elasticbrand, a series of jewelry inspired by musical instruments used to make a hip hop album. He was mastering engineer on the project and produced two songs for the album, which among other museums worldwide, was a feature display at the New York Museum of Art and Design. He is a contributing producer on the late 2021 album Live 95 by Mega Ran, which charted as high as #6 under "Current R&B/Hip-Hop Albums" and "Top New Artist Albums" on the on Billboard Charts.

As a host, producer and director for IndieFeed, his hip hop show achieved over 25 million Nielsen Media Research verified downloads, and more than 750 five-star ratings and reviews in the iTunes Store. His show maintained a steady ranking in the daily top audio podcasts list in the iTunes podcast directory. In 2010, Mashable named IndieFeed one of "7 Essential Podcasts You Should Add To Your Playlist". In 2008, IndieFeed received a "Best of iTunes" award. In 2007, IndieFeed was the in-store music used in Guitar Center retail outlets across America. In 2006, IndieFeed was selected as one of eight "Best Online Picks" by Business Week magazine. Up to November 2010, IndieFeed Networks has achieved over 100 million Nielsen Media Research verified downloads.

== Credits ==
- February 15, 2008 Troublemakers LP, Breez Evahflowin and Dirt E. Dutch (producer, lyricist, engineer)
- October 28, 2008 Remixes, Releases Robots! LP, Breez Evahflowin and Dirt E. Dutch (producer, lyricist, engineer)
- May 6, 2008 Journey Towards the Sun LP, Rising Sun Quest (contributing producer, engineer)
- January 21, 2009 Hardly Seen Rarely Heard LP, Emskee of the Good People (lyricist)
- March 31, 2009 The Unearthed Past: A Collection of Underground Hip Hop Vol. 1 Breez Evahflowin (engineer)
- April 7, 2009 Untitled Is Hard Enough EP, The Protege of Phenetiks (engineer)
- November 3, 2009 The Sharing Is Caring EP, Deto 22 and Sketch tha Cataclysm (engineer)
- November 19, 2009 Hydrostatic Equilibrium EP, Rising Sun Quest (engineer)
- December 15, 2009 Apples and Sunshine LP, Workforce (producer, lyricist, engineer)
- January 5, 2010 First Words: Earn Everything LP, Pruven (contributing producer)
- April 6, 2010 Disrupting Nature's Balance LP, Expertiz (contributing producer, engineer)
- April 26, 2010 Internationally Known LP, Nomadic Wax (contributing producer)
- July 20, 2010 Dear Whoever/Duro maxi-single, Roc Doogie (producer, engineer)
- July 28, 2010 As He Goes In Mixtape Breez Evahflowin (contributing producer, lyricist)
- September 21, 2010 Sound Of My Life digi-12, Breez Evahflowin (producer, engineer)
- October 12, 2010 As He Goes On LP, Breez Evahflowin (producer, engineer, lyricist)
- December 14, 2010 Ageless digi-12, Breez Evahflowin (producer, engineer, lyricist)
- January 11, 2011 Hit the Dutchman LP, Dirt E. Dutch (producer, engineer, lyricist)
- June 7, 2011 Without Permission EP, Infinito 2017 (producer, engineer)
- August 3, 2011 Audiowear LP, Elasticbrand (contributing producer, engineer)
- September 1, 2011 First Come First Served EP Vol. 1, JK1 the Supernova (engineer)
- September 13, 2011 Bars Magica LP, Dirt E. Dutch (producer, engineer, lyricist)
- September 27, 2011 Indie Rappers Do It For Gas Money 2 LP, Sketch Tha Cataclysm (contributing producer, engineer)
- December 13, 2011 Exact Science LP, Expertiz (engineer)
- March 12, 2012 PremRock and Willie Green: Reassembled LP, PremRock and Willie Green (contributing producer)
- March 30, 2012 Roc Paper Scissors LP, Roc Doogie (contributing producer, engineer)
- October 30, 2012 The Eargasm LP, Corina Corina (contributing producer)
- October 30, 2012 Blood Written In Ink LP, Art Form Rejects (engineer)
- March 18, 2014 The Free Way LP, Corina Corina (contributing producer)
- June 3, 2014 In No Uncertain Terms LP, CenTinels (engineer)
- June 23, 2017 Bring Out Your Dead EP, Breez Evahflowin and Deep of 2 Hungry Bros (executive producer, engineer, lyricist)
- Feb 13, 2018 On Love Single, Breez Evahflowin (lyricist)
- October 27, 2019 777 Vol 3 LP, Vast Aire, Pruven (contributing producer)
- November 12, 2019 Mostly Ill but Sometimes Sick EP, Atari Blitzkrieg and Dirt E. Dutch (producer, engineer)
- November 30, 2019 Christmas with Dutchman Single, Dirt E. Dutch (lyricist, producer, engineer)
- July 5, 2020 Private Stock Double LP (Vinyl), Cavalier (contributing producer)
- October 27, 2020 Ghouls 'N Ghosts 4 LP, Mega Ran, Richie Branson, Kadesh Flow (contributing producer)
- October 30, 2020 You Look SUS Single, Mega Ran, GameChops (producer)
- November 13, 2020 The Unconditional LP, Dirt E. Dutch (producer)
- October 16, 2021 Seconds LP, Breez Evahflowin and Dirt E. Dutch (producer, lyricist, engineer)
- October 21, 2021 Live 95 LP, Mega Ran (contributing producer)
- March 10, 2024 Do It Right Single, Homeboy Sandman (producer)
- January 2, 2025 It Must Be Single, Mega Ran & Richie Branson (producer)
- July 2, 2025 House O Blues Single, Dirt E. Dutch, Sadat X (lyricist, engineer)
- October 28, 2025 Kool Single, Dirt E. Dutch (lyricist, engineer)
- February 28, 2026 Toca La Grama Single, Dirt E. Dutch, Homeboy Sandman (lyricist, engineer)
- April 03, 2026 Freeksho Single, Dirt E. Dutch, A Stolen Nova (lyricist, producer, engineer)
- May 04, 2026 Vader's Promenade Single, Dirt E. Dutch (lyricist, engineer)
- June 02, 2026 Temples Single, Dirt E. Dutch, A Stolen Nova (lyricist, engineer)
- July 03, 2026 American Dream (HOB Remix) Single, Dirt E. Dutch, Sadat X (lyricist, engineer)
- August 19, 2026 Like That Single, Warren Britt, LT Headtrip (producer, engineer)

== Appearances ==
=== Songs ===
- "Chains" - Breez Evahflowin and Dirt E. Dutch ft. Phenetiks
- "Repo Men" - Breez Evahflowin and Dirt E. Dutch
- "Ridiculous Choices" - Emskee ft. Troublemakers
- "Barely Livin"' - Workforce
- "Sketchforce" - Workforce ft. Sketch tha cataclysm
- "Ageless" - Breez Evahflowin ft. Dirt E. Dutch
- "War Torn" - Breez Evahflowin ft. Roc Doogie, Dirt E. Dutch, Core Rhythm, Pauley Ethnic
- "Together" - Dirt E. Dutch ft. Hawl Digg, Breez Evahflowin
- "Stimulated" - Breez Evahflowin ft. Dirt E. Dutch, DJ Static
- "On Love" - Breez Evahflowin ft. Dirt E. Dutch
- "Christmas with Dutchman" - Dirt E. Dutch
- "Back to Work" - Breez Evahflowin and Dirt E. Dutch
- "Resolute" - Breez Evahflowin and Dirt E. Dutch
- "Seconds" - Breez Evahflowin and Dirt E. Dutch
- "Rumble" - Breez Evahflowin and Dirt E. Dutch
- "On Love Redux" - Breez Evahflowin and Dirt E. Dutch
- "Still Holding" - Breez Evahflowin and Dirt E. Dutch
- "Calling it Quits" - Breez Evahflowin and Dirt E. Dutch
- "Never Forget" - Breez Evahflowin and Dirt E. Dutch
- "House O Blues" - Dirt E. Dutch ft. Sadat X
- "Kool" - Dirt E. Dutch
- "Toca La Grama" - Dirt E. Dutch ft. Homeboy Sandman
- "Freeksho" - Dirt E. Dutch ft. A Stolen Nova
- "Vader's Promenade" - Dirt E. Dutch
- "Temples" - A Stolen Nova ft. Dirt E. Dutch
- "American Dream (HOB Remix)" - Dirt E. Dutch ft. Sadat X

=== Videos ===
- Don't Be Afraid - Breez Evahflowin and Dirt E. Dutch
- Careful - Breez Evahflowin and Dirt E. Dutch
- Nothing - The Protege of Phenetiks
- Walk With The Beat - Rising Sun Quest
- No Pressure - The Protege of Phenetiks
- I'll Rhyme Now - Rising Sun Quest
