= Write to Death =

Extended play by Illogic

Write to Death is a series of EPs from American rapper Illogic. Write to Death 1 was released in August 2003 and Write to Death 2 was released in February 2006.

== Write to Death 1 ==
Write to Death 1

EP by Illogic
- Released: August 22, 2003
- Genres: Alternative hip hop Underground hip hop
- Length: 11:25
- Label: Weightless Recordings
- Producer: Blueprint

Illogic chronology
Got Lyrics? (2001)	Write to Death 1 (2003)	Celestial Clockwork (2004)

#	Title
1	"I Need A Pen"
2	"Write For What?"
3	"1992"
4	"Angelic Bombs"
5	"Distance From The Sun"
6	"Severed Fingers"
7	"I Am Not Strange"
8	"Possible 666"
9	"Centered"
10	"War (ft. Da Vu)"

== Write to Death 2 ==
Write to Death 2

EP by Illogic
- Released: 2005
- Genres: Alternative hip hop Underground hip hop
- Length: 1:11
- Label: Weightless Recordings
- Producer: Blueprint

Illogic chronology
Celestial Clockwork (2004)	Write to Death 2 (2005)	One Bar Left (2008)

Professional ratings
Review scores
Source	Rating
Rap Reviews	6/10

#	Title
1	"They Wonder Why I'm Insane" (prod. by Eyamme)
2	"Stay Sleep" (prod. by Drum and Knowledge)
3	"Time Is Coming" (prod. by Walter Rocktight)
4	"An Ocean" (prod. by Blockhead)
5	"I Can Only Give You Love" (prod. by Eyamme)
6	"Yellow" (prod. by Ill Poetic)
7	"Get Up" (prod. by Earmint)
8	"Capsized" (prod. by Overflo)
9	"Liquid Meets Land" (prod. by DrunkLo)
10	"I've Been Here Before" (prod. by Eyamme)
11	"Quit" (prod. by Tru Skills)
12	"The Missing Pieces" (prod. by Periphery)
