= 4th Pyramid =

- Born: Adam Farag
- Origin: Toronto, Ontario, Canada
- Occupations: Rapper, songwriter, producer, DJ
- Labels: Definitive Jux, Universal Music Group, Scion A/V
- Website: 4thpyramid.com

Adam Farag, professionally known as 4th Pyramid, is a hip hop recording artist, producer, songwriter and DJ from Toronto, Ontario of Egyptian descent. He is currently the official DJ for Toronto rapper and Juno-award winner Jazz Cartier.

== Career ==
=== Beginnings ===
4th Pyramid entered the hip hop scene with the release of his self-produced debut album, The Light is But a Shade of the Darkness', an instrumental full-length. Chuck D of Public Enemy handpicked 4th Pyramid's 'Wallabee Strut' as one of the best 100 MP3s of 2000. He was signed to rap label Definitive Jux, owned by El-P (Run the Jewels), and appeared on the album Definitive Jux Presents III. During this time, he also collaborated with label mates including Cannibal Ox and Camu Tao.

=== Rap ===
4th Pyramid released his debut solo rap album The Pyramid Scheme in 2012 after signing a deal with Universal Music Canada. The album included the single "It's So Hot" featuring Greg Nice of Nice and Smooth in 2010. The track was featured in the film 21 and Over and also appeared on the film's soundtrack. The album also included collaborations with Saukrates, Marco Polo & more. In 2013, he released the EP The Sky Belongs To The Stars which included the single "Friday Nights" produced by Grandtheft. He has toured with Wu-Tang Clan, ASAP Rocky, De La Soul, Elzhi, The Pharcyde and others.

=== Production ===
4th Pyramid has produced and engineered tracks for the Black Eyed Peas, members of Wu-Tang Clan, Pete Rock and others.

=== DJ ===
4th Pyramid formed the DJ group, Sheen Bros with Philadelphia DJ, Cosmo Baker and they released several mixtapes together and an EP through the Scion/AV label. 4th Pyramid continues to DJ internationally and is currently the official DJ for Capitol Records recording artist, Jazz Cartier. The two have toured Europe, North America and Canada including a tour with Post Malone.

== Discography ==
=== Albums ===
Title	Label Details	Year
The Light is But a Shade of the Darkness	4th Pyramid Productions	2004
T.Dot to NY: Worldwide	4th Pyramid Productions	2006
The Pyramid Scheme	Silk Ivory/Universal Music	2012
The Sky Belongs to the Stars	Silk Ivory/Universal Music	2013

=== Singles ===
Title	Details	Date
Aquatic b/w War With Orcs	4th Pyramid	2003
Fantazmic	Featuring Akrobatik, C Rayz Walz	2005
P-Y-R-A-M-I-D	45 King Featuring Wale, Pase Rock	2008
It's So Hot	Featuring Greg Nice, Cosmo Baker	2010

=== Production and appearances ===
Title	Artist / Album / Year	Role	Peak chart positions	
Title	Artist / Album / Year	Role	US R&B/Hip-Hop	Top Independent Albums
"Lipton"	U-God / Dopium / 2009	Producer	93	—
"They Don't Want Music" featuring James Brown (Pete Rock Remix)	Black Eyed Peas / Renegotiations: The Remixes / 2006	Engineer	—	—
"Aquatic"	Definitive Jux Presents 3 / 2004	Rapper	—	22
"The Lineup" featuring MF Doom, Breezly Brewin, Vast Aire, Wordsworth, J-Treds	C-Rayz Walz / Ravipops / 2003	Producer	—	—
"—" denotes a title that did not chart, or was not released in that territory.
