= The Weightroom =

Studio album by Blueprint
- Released: April 8, 2003
- Genre: Hip hop
- Length: 54:59
- Label: Weightless Recordings
- Producer: Blueprint

Blueprint chronology
The Weightroom (2003)	Chamber Music (2004)

Professional ratings
Review scores
Source	Rating
HipHopDX	(7/10)
MVRemix	(7.0/10)
Rap Reviews	(8/10)

The Weightroom is a studio album by American hip hop musician Blueprint. It was released on Weightless Recordings in 2003.

== Track listing ==
No.	Title	Length
1.	"Intro"	0:42
2.	"The Proper Education" (featuring Greenhouse Effect)	4:38
3.	"Time Management"	4:04
4.	"Paradise" (featuring Iskabibbles)	2:37
5.	"Prison Workout" (featuring CJ the Cynic)	2:43
6.	"Lucky" (featuring Illogic)	2:43
7.	"Rags to Rugged" (featuring Badaddy Shabaz)	3:53
8.	"I.C.U." (featuring Cannibal Ox)	4:14
9.	"Five Dollar Boy....Million Dollar Man" (featuring Bru Lei)	3:15
10.	"That's What You Get" (featuring The Minor League)	4:53
11.	"Slave Songs" (featuring Drown)	3:07
12.	"Obsolete" (featuring The Orphanage)	3:59
13.	"Before Freedom (Fight the Power)"	4:30
14.	"Outro"	3:23
