= Look Mom... No Hands =

Studio album by Vast Aire
- Released: April 27, 2004
- Genre: Hip-hop
- Length: 71:57
- Label: Chocolate Industries
- Producer: Jest One; Camu Tao; T One; Nasa; Jake One; Blueprint; Cryptic One; MF Doom; Ayatollah; Madlib; RJD2; Da Beatminerz; Vast Aire

Vast Aire chronology
Look Mom... No Hands (2004)	The Best Damn Rap Show (2005)

Singles from Look Mom... No Hands
- 1. "Elixir" Released: 2004; 2. "Look Mom... No Hands" Released: 2004; 3. "Pegasus" Released: 2004

Look Mom... No Hands is the first solo studio album by American hip-hop musician Vast Aire, one half of the duo Cannibal Ox. It was released on Chocolate Industries on April 27, 2004. It features contributions from MF Doom, RJD2, Madlib, Aesop Rock, and Sadat X. It peaked at number 47 on the Billboard Independent Albums chart.

== Critical reception ==
Professional ratings
Review scores
Source	Rating
AllMusic	3.5/5 stars
The A.V. Club	favorable
CMJ New Music Monthly	favorable
Exclaim!	mixed
Pitchfork	6.3/10
PopMatters	favorable
Stylus Magazine	D+

John Bush of AllMusic gave the album 3.5 stars out of 5, stating, "Vast's chillingly detached raps and delivery were a large part of Cannibal Ox's success, and there's much more in the same vein here." Nathan Rabin of The A.V. Club described it as a "riveting combination of old school B-boy attitude and post-apocalyptic menace". Christopher R. Weingarten of CMJ New Music Monthly commented that "Vast's flow, while leisurely, still utilizes the most impossibly matter-of-fact delivery in the underground, which he uses for maximum effect."

Meanwhile, David Drake of Stylus Magazine gave the album a grade of D+, saying, "this album lacks the plaintive street poetry of The Cold Vein, as well as that album's focus and consistent production aesthetic." Rollie Pemberton of Pitchfork gave the album a 6.3 out of 10, calling it "an awkward, inconsistent amalgam of wasted talent and musical apathy."

== Track listing ==
No.	Title	Producer(s)	Length
1.	"Intro: His Majesty's Laughter"	Jest One	2:10
2.	"KRS-Lightly" (featuring S.A. Smash)	Camu Tao	4:03
3.	"Pegasus"	T One	3:19
4.	"Candid Cam / Live Wetlands 1996"	Nasa	5:02
5.	"Viewtiful Flow"	Jake One	4:59
6.	"Zenith" (featuring Blueprint)	Blueprint	4:33
7.	"Why'sdaskyblue?"	Cryptic One	4:33
8.	"Da Supafriendz" (featuring MF Doom)	MF Doom	3:00
9.	"Poverty Lane 16128 / Karaoke"	T One	4:44
10.	"Elixir" (featuring Sadat X and Sinclair)	Ayatollah	4:03
11.	"Look Mom... No Hands / A.S.C.F.D."	Madlib	6:22
12.	"9 Lashes (When Michael Smacks Lucifer)"	RJD2	3:53
13.	"Posse Slash" (featuring Karniege, Breez Evahflowin', Poison Pen, and Aesop Rock)	Da Beatminerz	3:41
14.	"Could You Be?"	Madlib	3:57
15.	"Outro: 12 Noon"	Blueprint	4:22
16.	"Life's Ill Pt. II (The Empire Striketh)" (featuring Breezly Brewin and Vordul Mega)	Madlib	5:08
17.	"My First Sony (Pegasus Remix)"	Vast Aire	4:08
Total length:			71:57

== Personnel ==
Credits adapted from liner notes.

- Vast Aire – vocals, production (17), photography
- Jest One – production (1), recording (1)
- Bo Boddie – mixing (1–7, 9–12, 14–17)
- S.A. Smash – vocals (2)
- DJ Cip One – turntables (2, 3, 5, 6, 10, 12, 13, 17)
- Camu Tao – production (2)
- Nasa – recording (2), production (4)
- T One – production (3, 9)
- Nonezio – recording (3–5, 8–12, 14, 16, 17)
- Karniege – vocals (4, 13), graffiti art
- Nathaniel Roberts – vocals (5, 14), recording (11)
- Jake One – production (5)
- Blueprint – vocals (6), production (6, 15), recording (6, 15)
- Metro – vocals (7)
- Cryptic One – production (7), recording (7)
- MF Doom – vocals (8), production (8), mixing (8)
- Sadat X – vocals (10)
- Sinclair – vocals (10), keyboards (14)
- Ayatollah – production (10), turntables (10)
- Madlib – production (11, 14, 16)
- RJD2 – production (12)
- Breez Evahflowin' – vocals (13)
- Poison Pen – vocals (13)
- Aesop Rock – vocals (13)
- Da Beatminerz – production (13)
- Evil D – recording (13), mixing (13)
- Mr. Walt – recording (13), mixing (13)
- Butta L – engineering assistance (13)
- Simone Harrison – vocals (14)
- Breezly Brewin – vocals (16)
- Vordul Mega – vocals (16)
- Chris Gehringer – mastering
- Brent Rollins – art direction, design
- Jon Breiner – cover illustration
- Luke Barber Smith – photography
- Sumkid – photography
- Taku – photography
- Kenshin Ichikawa – Vast Aire logo

== Charts ==
Chart	Peak position
US Independent Albums (Billboard)	47
