= Def Jux Presents =

Compilation album by various artists
- Released: March 20, 2001
- Genre: Hip hop
- Length: 32:44
- Label: Definitive Jux
- Producer: El-P; RJD2; Aesop Rock; Mr. Len

Definitive Jux chronology
Def Jux Presents (2001)	Farewell Fondle 'Em (2001)

Singles from Def Jux Presents
- 1. "DPA (As Seen on TV)" / "Iron Galaxy" Released: 2000

Def Jux Presents is a 2001 compilation album released by American hip hop record label Definitive Jux.

"DPA (As Seen on TV)" peaked at number 36 on the Billboard Hot Rap Songs chart.

== Critical reception ==
Professional ratings
Review scores
Source	Rating
AllMusic	4/5 stars
Muzik	4/5

Victor W. Valdivia of AllMusic called Def Jux Presents "a way to introduce newcomers to the formidable talent at the label" and "a collection of great underground hip-hop".

In 2015, Fact placed the album at number 37 on its "100 Best Indie Hip-Hop Records of All Time" list.

== Track listing ==
No.	Title	Artist(s)	Length
1.	"DPA (As Seen on TV)"	Company Flow	6:52
2.	"Simian D AKA Feeling Ignorant"	Company Flow featuring Ill Bill	6:15
3.	"Iron Galaxy"	Cannibal Ox	5:11
4.	"Silver Fox"	RJD2	3:32
5.	"Straight Off the D.I.C."	Cannibal Ox	4:20
6.	"Kill 'Em All"	Aesop Rock	3:00
7.	"Simple"	Company Flow	3:34

== Personnel ==
Credits adapted from liner notes.

- El-P – vocals (1, 2, 7), production (1, 2, 3, 5, 7)
- Mr. Len – turntables (1, 2, 3, 5, 7), production (7)
- Ill Bill – vocals (2)
- Vordul Mega – vocals (3, 5)
- Vast Aire – vocals (3, 5)
- RJD2 – production (4)
- Aesop Rock – vocals (6), production (6)
