= Bestiary (Hail Mary Mallon album) =

Studio album by Hail Mary Mallon
- Released: November 11, 2014
- Recorded: 2013–2014
- Genre: Hip hop
- Length: 42:08
- Label: Rhymesayers Entertainment
- Producer: Aesop Rock; Rob Sonic

Hail Mary Mallon chronology
Are You Gonna Eat That? (2011)	Bestiary (2014)

Aesop Rock chronology
Hokey Fright (2013)	Bestiary (2014)	The Impossible Kid (2016)

Rob Sonic chronology
Alice in Thunderdome (2014)	Bestiary (2014)	Defriender (2018)

Professional ratings
Review scores
Source	Rating
AllMusic	4/5 stars
RapReviews	9/10
Spectrum Culture	3.75/5
Tom Hull	B+

Bestiary is the second and final studio album by American hip hop group Hail Mary Mallon. It was released on November 10, 2014, via Rhymesayers Entertainment. Production was handled by members Aesop Rock and Rob Sonic. The album debuted at number 96 on the Billboard 200, number 12 on the Top R&B/Hip-Hop Albums, number 7 on both the Top Rap Albums and Independent Albums, and number 5 on the Vinyl Albums charts in the United States.

== Track listing ==
All tracks are written by Ian Bavitz and Rob Smith.

No.	Title	Producer(s)	Length
1.	"Jonathan"	Aesop Rock	3:25
2.	"Krill"	Aesop Rock	3:10
3.	"Used Cars"	Aesop Rock	3:21
4.	"Dollywood"	Aesop Rock	2:58
5.	"The Soup"	Aesop Rock	3:41
6.	"4 A.M."	Aesop Rock	2:37
7.	"Hang Ten"	Aesop Rock	4:04
8.	"Whales"	Aesop Rock	1:55
9.	"Merlin"	Aesop Rock	1:01
10.	"Picture Day"	Aesop Rock	1:16
11.	"Kiln"	Rob Sonic	3:32
12.	"King Cone"	Aesop Rock	3:45
13.	"Octoberfest"	Rob Sonic	3:31
14.	"The Red List"	Rob Sonic	3:52
Total length:			42:08

Deluxe edition bonus tracks
No.	Title	Length
15.	"Used Cars" (Edison Remix)	3:39
16.	"The Red List" (Blockhead Remix)	3:17
17.	"Horse Flakes"	2:39

== Personnel ==
- Ian "Aesop Rock" Bavitz – vocals, producer (tracks: 1–10, 12), executive producer
- Robert "Rob Sonic" Smith – vocals, producer (tracks: 11, 13, 14), executive producer
- DJ Big Wiz – scratches
- Joey Raia – mixing
- Joe LaPorta – mastering
- Brent Sayers – executive producer
- Sean "Slug" Daley – executive producer
- Justin "Coro" Kaufman – design

== Charts ==
Chart (2014)	Peak position
US Billboard 200	96
US Top R&B/Hip-Hop Albums (Billboard)	12
US Top Rap Albums (Billboard)	7
US Independent Albums (Billboard)	7
US Vinyl Albums (Billboard)	5
