= Blade of the Ronin =

Studio album by Cannibal Ox
- Released: March 3, 2015
- Genre: Hip-hop
- Length: 1:02:11
- Label: I.G.C.; iHipHop
- Producer: Bill Cosmiq; Black Milk

Cannibal Ox chronology
The Cold Vein (2001)	Blade of the Ronin (2015)	Aireplane (2025)

Blade of the Ronin is the second studio album by American hip-hop duo Cannibal Ox. It was released on March 3, 2015, through IGC Records and iHipHop Distribution on March 3, 2015. Production was handled by Bill Cosmiq, except for one track produced by Black Milk. It features guest appearances from The Quantum, Artifacts, Double A.B., Elohem S.T.A.R., Elzhi, Irealz, Kenyattah Black, MF Doom, Space, Swave Sevah and U-God. The album debuted at number 45 on both the Top R&B/Hip-Hop Albums and the Independent Albums charts in the United States.

== Critical reception ==
Professional ratings
Aggregate scores
Source	Rating
AnyDecentMusic?	7.1/10
Metacritic	71/100
Review scores
Source	Rating
AllMusic	3.5/5 stars
Consequence of Sound	B−
Exclaim!	8/10
HipHopDX	3.5/5
Pitchfork	6.7/10
PopMatters	6/10
Record Collector	3/5 stars
Spin	8/10
The Guardian	3/5 stars
Tiny Mix Tapes	4/5 marks

Blade of the Ronin was met with universal acclaim from music critics. At Metacritic, which assigns a normalized rating out of 100 to reviews from mainstream publications, the album received an average score of 71 based on sixteen reviews. The aggregator AnyDecentMusic? has the critical consensus of the album at a 7.1 out of 10, based on ten reviews.

Kyle Mullin of Exclaim! called the album "an early contender for 2015's top rap album". Dan Weiss of Spin found the album "isn't quite that esoteric or ambitious, just an adept, hour-long reminder of how 14 years ago these guys turned your average boom bap into elaborate fantasies of iron galaxies and screamed phoenixes". Tiny Mix Tapes writer stated: "there's a purity to Blade of the Ronin, which provides a welcome alternative to the macho self-aggrandizement that constitutes most contemporary rap music".

AllMusic's David Jeffries saw the album "comes shockingly close to the sound and the excitement of their 2001 effort The Cold Vein, and offers the same kind of combination of street knowledge and sweet punch lines, all delivered over rickety yet compelling beats". Homer Johnsen of HipHopDX called it "a dense collection of music", resuming: "fans of lyricism will appreciate the wordplay, as well as the contributions from artists like Elzhi and MF Doom, among many others".

Kristofer Lenz of Consequence concluded: "while Blade of the Ronin doesn't double down on the trail-blazing vision of its predecessor, it is a more than capable sequel to a genre classic". Winston Cook-Wilson of Pitchfork wrote: "even those who decided years ago that this album was going to be great will be hard-pressed to find a great rap record here, only a sporadically enjoyable one".

In mixed reviews, Colin Fitzgerald of PopMatters called the album "a modest, dignified return for one of underground hip-hop fans' long lost favorites. It won't be a memorable record, but for fans who have waited this long for something new, it provides". Paul Bowler of Record Collector claimed: "while Vast Aire and Vordul Mega rarely hit the heights of their former lyrical ingenuity, their stream-of-consciousness rapping style remains one of the most potent forces in hip-hop". Paul MacInnes of The Guardian wrote: "while the sound has lost its edge, the MCs--Vast Aire in particular--still possess great verbal imagination".

Spin ranked the album at number 31 on their 'The 50 Best Hip-Hop Albums of 2015' list.

== Track listing ==
No.	Title	Writer(s)	Producer(s)	Length
1.	"Cipher Unknown" (Intro)	Theodore Arrington II; Shamar Gardner	Bill Cosmiq	1:59
2.	"Opposite of Desolate" (featuring Double A.B)	Arrington II; Gardner; Dylan Tucker; Berles Désiré	Bill Cosmiq	3:33
3.	"Psalm 82"	Arrington II; Gardner	Bill Cosmiq	3:24
4.	"The Power Cosmiq" (featuring Kenyattah Black)	Arrington II; Gardner; Benny Wise; Désiré	Bill Cosmiq	4:54
5.	"Blade: The Art of OX" (featuring Artifacts and U-God)	Arrington II; Gardner; Rahem Ross Brown; William E. Williams; Lamont Hawkins	Black Milk	4:35
6.	"Pressure of Survival" (Skit)	Arrington II; Gardner	Bill Cosmiq	0:23
7.	"Carnivorous" (featuring Elzhi and Bill Cosmiq)	Arrington II; Gardner; Jason Powers; Désiré	Bill Cosmiq	4:32
8.	"Thunder in July" (featuring Space, Swave Sevah and Elohem Star)	Arrington II; Gardner; D. Helms; Tion Sutton; Kyle Walker; Désiré	Bill Cosmiq	4:34
9.	"Water"	Arrington II; Gardner; Désiré	Bill Cosmiq	4:00
10.	"The Horizon" (Interlude)	Arrington II; Gardner	Bill Cosmiq	1:43
11.	"Harlem Knights"	Arrington II; Gardner; Désiré	Bill Cosmiq	3:37
12.	"Sabertooth" (featuring Irealz and Bill Cosmiq)	Arrington II; Gardner; El Ireality; Désiré	Bill Cosmiq	4:50
13.	"Iron Rose" (featuring MF Doom)	Arrington II; Gardner; Daniel Dumile; Désiré	Bill Cosmiq	4:03
14.	"Solar System (Cosmos)" (Skit)	Arrington II; Gardner	Bill Cosmiq	0:47
15.	"The Fire Rises"	Arrington II; Gardner; Désiré	Bill Cosmiq	3:17
16.	"Gotham (Ox City)"	Arrington II; Gardner	Bill Cosmiq	4:35
17.	"Unison" (Skit)	Arrington II; Gardner	Bill Cosmiq	0:24
18.	"Vision" (featuring The Quantum)	Arrington II; Gardner; Gregory Maher; Désiré	Bill Cosmiq	3:43
19.	"Salvation"	Arrington II; Gardner; Désiré	Bill Cosmiq	3:18
Total length:				1:02:11

Digital deluxe edition bonus tracks
No.	Title	Length
20.	"Silver Hawks" (featuring Kenyattah Black)	5:01
21.	"Moksha"	2:16
22.	"The Eternal Path"	3:10
23.	"Iron Rose (Skylab 3 Remix)" (featuring MF Doom)	4:16

== Personnel ==
- Theodore "Vast Aire" Arrington II – vocals, arranger, executive producer, art direction, A&R
- Shamar "Vordul Mega" Gardner – vocals, art direction
- Dylan "Double A.B" Tucker – vocals (track 2)
- Benny "Kenyattah Black" Wise – vocals (track 4)
- Rahem Ross "Tame One" Brown – vocals (track 5)
- William E. "El Da Sensei" Williams – vocals (track 5)
- Lamont "U-God" Hawkins – vocals (track 5)
- Jason "Elzhi" Powers – vocals (track 7)
- Berles "Bill Cosmiq" Désiré – vocals (tracks: 7, 12, 18), producer (tracks: 1–4, 6–19), arranger, executive producer
- D. "Space" Helms – vocals (track 8)
- Tion "Swave Sevah" Sutton – vocals (track 8)
- Kyle "Elohem S.T.A.R." Walker – vocals (track 8)
- El "Irealz" Ireality – vocals (track 12)
- Daniel "MF Doom" Dumile – vocals (track 13)
- Gregory "Salvador" Maher – vocals (track 18), additional art layout
- DJ Cip One – scratches
- Curtis "Black Milk" Cross – producer (track 5)
- Brad "Syntax" Theophila – mixing
- Matty Trump – mastering
- Chuck Wilson – executive producer
- Djob Nkondo Jonathan – artwork
- Eric Bayruns – A&R
- Jeremy Gerson – A&R

== Charts ==
Chart (2015)	Peak position
US Top R&B/Hip-Hop Albums (Billboard)	45
US Independent Albums (Billboard)	45
US Heatseekers Albums (Billboard)	12
