= The Revolution of Yung Havoks =

Studio album by Vordul Mega
- Released: November 2, 2004
- Genre: Hip-hop
- Length: 45:27
- Label: Nature Sounds
- Producer: Opto; Ruddy Rock; Soul Purpose; Belief; Dev 1; Blockhead; Omega One

Vordul Mega chronology
The Revolution of Yung Havoks (2004)	Megagraphitti (2008)

Singles from The Revolution of Yung Havoks
- 1. "Spitamatic" / "Neva Again" Released: 2004; 2. "Believe" / "Stay Up" Released: 2005

The Revolution of Yung Havoks is the first solo studio album by American rapper Vordul Mega, one half of Cannibal Ox. It was released on Nature Sounds in 2004.

== Critical reception ==
Professional ratings
Review scores
Source	Rating
Pitchfork	7.0/10
RapReviews.com	6.5
Spin	B+
Vibe	favorable

Brian Howe of Pitchfork gave the album a 7.0 out of 10, stating that "The Revolution of Yung Havoks is a hip-hop record for diehard hip-hop heads, but it fails to illuminate and render as viscerally as the 90s NYCentric micro-drama rap it emulates." He added, "for those of us without firsthand experience in holding down corners and running blocks, Vordul's debut lacks the narrative excitement and vivid, idiosyncratic detail necessary for our imaginations to fill in the blanks and render it anything more than a passing pleasure." Pedro Hernandez of RapReviews.com gave the album a 6.5 out of 10, writing, "Production is handled by mostly unknown producers, including 6 tracks by a cat named Belief, but the results are solid at worst and in some instances stellar." He added, "Vordul Mega isn't a bad MC by any stretch of the imagination, but he does little to pull away from the pack of rappers flooding today's market."

== Track listing ==
No.	Title	Producer(s)	Length
1.	"Neva Again"	Opto	3:01
2.	"Spitamatic" (featuring C-Rayz Walz)	Ruddy Rock	3:40
3.	"Holla Ill"	Soul Purpose	3:45
4.	"Hell Yeah"	Belief	3:49
5.	"Hard Times"	Dev 1	3:20
6.	"Blade"	Belief	3:18
7.	"Stay Up"	Belief	4:08
8.	"In the Hood" (featuring Karniege)	Dev 1	3:35
9.	"Pray"	Belief	3:37
10.	"Believe" (featuring Jean Grae)	Belief	3:14
11.	"Struggles"	Blockhead	3:06
12.	"Handle That" (featuring Vast Aire)	Omega One	3:46
13.	"Megallah"	Belief	3:09
Total length:			45:27
