= Respect the Architect =

Studio album by Blueprint
- Released: April 22, 2014
- Genre: Hip hop
- Length: 29:55
- Label: Weightless Recordings
- Producer: Blueprint, Imakemadbeats

Blueprint chronology
Deleted Scenes (2012)	Respect the Architect (2014)	King No Crown (2015)

Professional ratings
Review scores
Source	Rating
Exclaim!	(8/10)
HipHopDX	4/5 stars
Rap Reviews	(9/10)

Respect the Architect is a studio album by American hip hop musician Blueprint. It was released on Weighless Recordings in 2014.

It was chosen by Columbus Alive as one of their Top 10 Local Albums of 2014.

== Track listing ==
No.	Title	Producer(s)	Length
1.	"Good Vibe"	Blueprint	2:27
2.	"Oh Word?"	Blueprint	2:27
3.	"True Vision"	Blueprint	3:53
4.	"Overdosin'"	Blueprint	2:49
5.	"Once Again" (featuring Count Bass D and Midas Beast)	Blueprint	4:09
6.	"Respect the Architect"	Blueprint	3:24
7.	"Bulletproof Resume" (featuring Illogic)	Blueprint	3:29
8.	"Perspective"	Imakemadbeats	3:28
9.	"Silver Lining"	Blueprint	3:34
10.	"The Climb"	Blueprint	3:34
