= Ghetto Blaster (Push Button Objects album) =

Studio album by Push Button Objects
- Released: April 22, 2003
- Genre: Hip-hop; electronic
- Length: 47:22
- Label: Chocolate Industries
- Producer: Push Button Objects

Push Button Objects chronology
Dirty Dozen (2000)	Ghetto Blaster (2003)

Singles from Ghetto Blaster
- 1. "360 Degrees" Released: 2000; 2. "Fly" Released: 2002

Ghetto Blaster is a studio album by American hip-hop producer Push Button Objects. It was released on Chocolate Industries in 2003. It is the follow-up to Dirty Dozen.

== Critical reception ==
Professional ratings
Review scores
Source	Rating
AllMusic	4/5 stars
Pitchfork	7.2/10
Stylus Magazine	C+
XLR8R	favorable

Mark Pytlik of AllMusic gave the album 4 stars out of 5, calling it "an admirable reinvention that should indoctrinate [Edgar] Farinas into the new school of bleeding-edge underground hip-hop producers." Rollie Pemberton of Pitchfork gave the album a 7.2 out of 10, saying: "Surrounded by the highly polished sample fests of RJD2 and the ridiculously technical chop-a-thons of Prefuse 73, Push Button Objects is lost in the fold, regardless of his clear production prowess." Todd Hutlock of Stylus Magazine gave the album a grade of C+, writing: "Mostly, I found myself wishing that Farinas would just make separate rap and instrumental albums next time out."

It was ranked at number 19 on the CMJ "Hip-Hop 2003" chart.

== Track listing ==
No.	Title	Length
1.	"Hustlin"	2:41
2.	"360 Degrees" (featuring Del the Funky Homosapien, Mr. Lif, and DJ Craze)	3:39
3.	"Fly" (featuring Akrobatik, Maintain, and Vast Aire)	4:43
4.	"Interlude"	3:41
5.	"3 Doctors" (featuring Filkoe176, Illustrate, and ProVerbz)	4:35
6.	"Breakers Delight"	4:58
7.	"Air" (featuring Doseone)	5:59
8.	"Sleep"	4:16
9.	"Shut Down" (featuring Aesop Rock)	4:41
10.	"Interlude"	1:11
11.	"Washington Ave"	6:58
Total length:		47:22
