= Year of the Beast =

Studio album by C-Rayz Walz
- Released: May 17, 2005
- Genre: Hip-hop
- Length: 53:25
- Label: Definitive Jux
- Producer: R'Thentic; Catch-22; E-Cleazy; Aesop Rock; Pawl; Shakim Allah; Trilanga; Belief; El-P; Khiladi; Emile; Myk Defy; C-Rayz Walz; 4th Pyramid

C-Rayz Walz chronology
| We Live: The Black Samurai (2004) | Year of the Beast (2005) | 1975: The Return of the Beast (2006) |

Professional ratings
Review scores
| Source | Rating |
|---|---|
| AllMusic | 3/5 stars |
| Alternative Press | 3/5 |
| Pitchfork | 4.2/10 |
| PopMatters | 5/10 stars |
| Spin | B |

Year of the Beast is a studio album by American rapper C-Rayz Walz. It was released on Definitive Jux in 2005. The CD version of the album was initially released in a limited edition with a bonus DVD.

== Critical reception ==
Tom Breihan of Pitchfork gave the album a 4.2 out of 10, saying: "There's no sweep or vision, and so Walz's worst flaws are left exposed: his tendency to lose the beat, his obnoxious habit of multi-tracking his own voice, the lack of force or immediacy in his jumpy, splenetic delivery." Mike Schiller of PopMatters gave the album 5 stars out of 10, saying: "Even if you think what you're hearing is pretty decent, there's very little chance you remember much of it once you flip it off."

== Track listing ==
| No. | Title | Producer(s) | Length |
|---|---|---|---|
| 1. | "R'Thentic" | R'Thentic | 3:14 |
| 2. | "First Words Worse" (featuring EL-P) | Catch22; E-Cleazy | 3:21 |
| 3. | "Knowledge" | Aesop Rock | 3:26 |
| 4. | "Walk Through" (featuring Rob Sonic) | Pawl | 4:32 |
| 5. | "The Rhyme Intervention" (featuring 4th Pyramid) | Shakim Allah; Trilanga | 2:17 |
| 6. | "Street Reppin'" (featuring Vordul Mega) | Belief | 4:02 |
| 7. | "Paradise" | EL-P | 4:41 |
| 8. | "Music Take Ovah" (featuring Pudge) | Belief | 3:24 |
| 9. | "Pink" (featuring Jean Grae) | Belief | 4:24 |
| 10. | "Care Free" (featuring Jeanie) | Khiladi | 4:25 |
| 11. | "Say Werd" | Emile | 3:10 |
| 12. | "Blackout" (featuring The Angel & the Preacher) | Myk Defy | 3:46 |
| 13. | "Black Soap" (featuring M-1) | | 3:42 |
| 14. | "Mark of the Beast" (featuring Buddha Belly and Honest John) | C-Rayz Walz | 1:43 |
| 15. | "Officially Lost" | 4th Pyramid | 3:17 |
