= Monster Maker (album) =

Studio album by Sharkey & C-Rayz Walz
- Released: July 31, 2007
- Genre: Hip-hop
- Length: 40:05
- Label: Babygrande
- Producer: Sharkey

Professional ratings
Review scores
Source	Rating
AllHipHop	8/10 stars
Entertainment Weekly	B+
HipHopDX	3.5/5 stars
IGN	9.7/10
JIVE Magazine	4/5
PopMatters	5/10 stars
RapReviews.com	8/10

Monster Maker is a collaborative studio album by producer Sharkey and Bronx-based underground rapper C-Rayz Walz. It was released on July 31, 2007, through Babygrande Records, an independent label based in New York City. All production on the album was handled by Sharkey.

== Title ==
Sharkey describes the title of the album as the breaking point in day-to-day life. He says:

I feel like the world is the monster maker and I feel like everyone, no matter how good of a family you've been raised by, or how good of a person you are, is capable of being that person that is sitting in the middle of bumper to bumper traffic for an hour one day and on the verge of going out and blasting people. Everyone has that seed in them where they're capable of doing something monster-ish.

== Track listing ==
No.	Title	Length
1.	"Birth of Ratto di Laboratorio"	0:38
2.	"This Ol' Twisted World"	3:26
3.	"My Way"	3:18
4.	"Pain to the Picture"	3:41
5.	"Jumping Off at the Jump Off"	3:36
6.	"Electric Avenue"	3:41
7.	"Might She Shoot"	3:49
8.	"We Speak Animal"	3:03
9.	"Forgotten"	3:25
10.	"Loss of Niche" (featuring Zooks)	3:53
11.	"That Moment Before Crazy" (featuring Vast Aire)	4:20
12.	"Slim Chances"	3:17
