= One Bar Left =

EP by Illogic
- Released: November 23, 2008
- Genres: Alternative hip hop Underground hip hop
- Length: 0:01
- Label: Weightless Recordings
- Producer: Ill Poetic

Illogic chronology
Celestial Clockwork (2004)	One Bar Left (2008)	Diabolical Fun (2009)

One Bar Left is the EP from American rapper Illogic. It was released free in 2008. The EP was entirely produced by Ill Poetic.

== Track list ==
No.	Title	Length
1.	"Intro"	2:28
2.	"One Bar Left"	3:15
3.	"Change"	2:19
4.	"Half-Man Half-Vicious (feat. Ill Poetic)"	2:52
5.	"Soundtrack Theme"	4:12
6.	"Cold November Day"	4:44
