= OX 2010: A Street Odyssey =

Studio album by Vast Aire
- Released: May 31, 2011
- Genre: Hip-hop
- Length: 59:06
- Label: Fat Beats Records; Man Bites Dog Records
- Producer: Vast Aire; Kount Fif; Harry Fraud; Thanos; Arewhy; Surock; P.O.V.; Melodious Monk; Ayatollah; Brother Hood 603

Vast Aire chronology
Dueces Wild (2008)	OX 2010: A Street Odyssey (2011)

OX 2010: A Street Odyssey is the third solo studio album by American rapper Vast Aire, one half of the duo Cannibal Ox. It was released on Fat Beats Records and Man Bites Dog Records in 2011.

== Critical reception ==
Professional ratings
Aggregate scores
Source	Rating
Metacritic	61/100
Review scores
Source	Rating
AllMusic	4/5 stars
Exclaim!	favorable
HipHopDX	3.0/5
The Phoenix	3.5/4 stars
Pitchfork	4.6/10
Spin	mixed

At Metacritic, which assigns a weighted average score out of 100 to reviews from mainstream critics, the album received an average score of 61, based on 9 reviews, indicating "generally favorable reviews".

Gregory Heaney of AllMusic gave the album 4 stars out of 5, stating: "The first thing that's clear is that time has been kind to the rapper, whose flow is still as sharp as ever, though perhaps a shade less enigmatic." Thomas Quinlan of Exclaim! commented that "OX hits a few lows, but it has a lot more highlights and is the closest Vast Aire has come to revisiting The Cold Vein since the break-up of Cannibal Ox." Chris Faraone of The Phoenix wrote: "Although it's an imperfect effort in some regards, the somewhat conceptual OX 2010: A Street Odyssey testifies to Vast's highly developed steez, and does so with complements from MCs who effortlessly jibe with his arcane rhyme selections."

== Track listing ==
No.	Title	Producer(s)	Length
1.	"Intro: Ox 9000"	Kount Fif; Vast Aire	2:28
2.	"Nomad"	Kount Fif	3:12
3.	"Almighty Jose" (featuring Karniege)	Kount Fif	4:27
4.	"The Man of Steel"	Kount Fif	3:18
5.	"I Don't Care" (featuring Cappadonna)	Kount Fif	3:51
6.	"2090 (So Grimmy)" (featuring Double A.B.)	Harry Fraud	3:58
7.	"Phenom"	Harry Fraud	3:32
8.	"Horoscope"	Thanos	4:35
9.	"The Cannon of Samus" (featuring Kenyattah Black)	Arewhy	3:33
10.	"Dark Matter (Kali)" (featuring Space)	Thanos	4:06
11.	"Merry Go Round (Cirque du Freak)"	Surock	4:48
12.	"Thor's Hammer" (featuring Raekwon and Vordul Mega)	P.O.V.	3:38
13.	"Spy vs Spy"	Melodious Monk	3:36
14.	"The Verdict" (featuring Guilty Simpson)	Ayatollah	2:59
15.	"Battle of the Planets" (featuring Genesis)	Brother Hood 603	7:05
Total length:			59:06

== Personnel ==
Credits adapted from liner notes.

- Vast Aire – vocals, production (1)
- Kount Fif – production (1–5), mixing, mastering
- Karniege – vocals (3)
- Cappadonna – vocals (5)
- Double A.B. – vocals (6)
- Harry Fraud – production (6, 7)
- Thanos – production (8, 10)
- Kenyattah Black – vocals (9)
- Arewhy – production (9)
- Space – vocals (10)
- Surock – production (11)
- Raekwon – vocals (12)
- Vordul Mega – vocals (12)
- P.O.V. – production (12)
- Melodious Monk – production (13)
- Guilty Simpson – vocals (14)
- Ayatollah – production (14)
- Genesis – vocals (15)
- Brother Hood 603 – production (15)
- RML – art direction
- Orign – artwork
- Lazy Eye Graphics – layout
