= Telicatessen =

Studio album by Rob Sonic
- Released: September 7, 2004
- Genre: Hip hop
- Length: 46:21
- Label: Definitive Jux
- Producer: Rob Sonic

Rob Sonic chronology
Telicatessen (2004)	Sabotage Gigante (2007)

Singles from Telicatessen
- 1. "Death Vendor / Dylsexia" Released: June 18, 2004; 2. "Shoplift" Released: October 22, 2004

Professional ratings
Aggregate scores
Source	Rating
Metacritic	74/100
Review scores
Source	Rating
Alternative Press	6/10 stars
BBC Collective	4/5 stars
City Pages	favorable
Insomniac	favorable
NME	7/10 stars
RapReviews.com	8/10 stars
URB	4/5 stars

Telicatessen is the debut solo album by American hip hop artist and former Sonic Sum member Rob Sonic, released by the Definitive Jux label on September 7, 2004. An instrumental version of the album was released the following year, also by Definitive Jux. The album's title is a portmanteau word combining the terms "television" and "delicatessen".

== Music ==
All production, lyrics and vocals were by Rob Sonic, with the exception of the verses on "Sniper Picnic" by fellow New York MC Creature and Alaska and Windnbreeze from Definitive Jux labelmates Hangar 18 and backing vocals by M. Sayyid of the group Antipop Consortium. Scratches were performed by Fred Ones from Sonic's former group the Sonic Sum, and by DJ Big Wiz.

== Reception ==
At Metacritic, which assigns a weighted average score out of 100 to reviews from mainstream critics, Telicatessen received an average score of 74% based on 4 reviews, indicating "generally favorable reviews". Sonic's production was generally praised: a BBC review described the album's sound as "propulsive, hallucinogenic and inspiring," and RapReviews.com described it as "sonically adventurous" without verging into self-indulgence. His lyrics were widely regarded as highly abstract, which critics found to be both a strength ("two-second moments of total clarity bunched together and pouring out") and a weakness ("an endless stream of fleeting ideas").

== Use in other media ==
The track "Sniper Picnic" was featured on the soundtrack to the Activision game Tony Hawk's American Wasteland.

== Track listing ==
No.	Title	Writer(s)	Length
1.	"Strange Hammer"	R. Smith	4:06
2.	"Death Vendor"	R. Smith	3:07
3.	"New Car Smell"	R. Smith	2:27
4.	"Former Future"	R. Smith	2:05
5.	"Super Ball"	R. Smith	4:00
6.	"Sniper Picnic" (featuring Creature and Hangar 18)	R. Smith/S. Booker/T. Baker/I. McMullin	3:40
7.	"Telicatessen"	R. Smith	3:19
8.	"Behemoth"	R. Smith	3:28
9.	"Shoplift"	R. Smith	3:38
10.	"Dylsexia"	R. Smith	3:48
11.	"Riot Ender"	R. Smith	3:59
12.	"Location Is Everything"	R. Smith	3:55
13.	"Macomb's Dam Bridge"	R. Smith	4:48

== Equipment ==
The following equipment was used in the making of Telicatessen:

- ARP Odyssey
- ARP Little Brother
- Minimoog
- Yamaha SK-20
- Roland Juno-106
- Fender Rhodes Piano Bass
- Korg MS-2000
- Akai MPC 2000 XL
- Technics SL-1200s

== Credits ==
- Vocals, production: Rob Sonic
- Scratching: DJ Big Wiz, Fred Ones
- Additional vocals: Creature, Hangar 18, M. Sayyid
- Executive producer: El-P, Amaechi Uzoigwe
- Mastering: Ken Heitmueller
- Mixing: Fred Ones, Rob Sonic
- Engineering: Fred Ones, Rob Sonic, Ruff-N-Rugged
- Art Direction: Dan Ezra Lang
- Design: Dan Ezra Lang, Rob Sonic
- Illustrations: Dan Ezra Lang
