= Are You Gonna Eat That? =

Studio album by Hail Mary Mallon
- Released: June 7, 2011
- Recorded: 2010–2011
- Genre: Hip hop
- Length: 41:24
- Label: Rhymesayers
- Producer: Aesop Rock; Rob Sonic

Hail Mary Mallon chronology
| Are You Gonna Eat That? (2011) | Bestiary (2014) |

Professional ratings
Aggregate scores
| Source | Rating |
|---|---|
| Metacritic | (76/100) |
Review scores
| Source | Rating |
| HipHopDX | 3.5/5 stars |
| Okayplayer | (88/100) |
| Pitchfork | (6.7/10) |
| Spin | (positive) |
| Under the Radar | (mixed) |

Are You Gonna Eat That? is the debut full-length album by the American hip hop group Hail Mary Mallon, consisting of rapper/producers Aesop Rock and Rob Sonic, and disc jockey DJ Big Wiz.

== Release ==
It was released digitally on May 3, 2011, and was subsequently released on CD and double vinyl on June 7, 2011, by Rhymesayers. The album's first single was the song "Smock". It has sold over 1,197 copies in its first week and 3,648 digitally according to SoundScan through independent hip hop label Rhymesayers Entertainment.

== Track listing ==
All tracks are written by Hail Mary Mallon.

| No. | Title | Length |
|---|---|---|
| 1. | "Church Pants" | 4:20 |
| 2. | "Garfield" | 4:30 |
| 3. | "Grubstake" | 2:09 |
| 4. | "Meter Feeder" | 3:36 |
| 5. | "Smock" | 3:40 |
| 6. | "The Poconos" | 3:52 |
| 7. | "Breakdance Beach" | 2:20 |
| 8. | "Table Talk" | 3:20 |
| 9. | "Mailbox Baseball" | 3:21 |
| 10. | "Holy Driver" | 3:18 |
| 11. | "Knievel" | 3:51 |
| 12. | "Plagues and Bacon" | 3:31 |
| Total length: | | 41:24 |

== Charts ==
| Chart (2011) | Peak position |
|---|---|
| US Heatseekers Albums (Billboard) | 27 |
| US Top R&B/Hip-Hop Albums (Billboard) | 68 |

== Personnel ==
Credits adapted from the album's liner notes.

- Aesop Rock – production (1–5, 7, 9, 11)
- Rob Sonic – production (6, 8, 10, 12)
- DJ Big Wiz – scratching
- Allyson Baker – guitar
- Bruce Templeton – mastering
- Joey Raia – mixing
