= The Best Damn Rap Show =

Studio album by Vast Aire and Mighty Mi
- Released: April 5, 2005
- Genre: Hip-hop
- Length: 40:52
- Label: Eastern Conference Records
- Producer: Mighty Mi

Vast Aire chronology
Look Mom... No Hands (2004)	The Best Damn Rap Show (2005)	Dueces Wild (2008)

Mighty Mi chronology
The Best Damn Rap Show (2005)	Me Versus the Gods (2006)

The Best Damn Rap Show is a collaborative studio album by Vast Aire and Mighty Mi. It was released on Eastern Conference Records in 2005.

== Critical reception ==
Professional ratings
Review scores
Source	Rating
AllMusic	3/5 stars
The A.V. Club	favorable
Exclaim!	favorable
Exclaim!	favorable
Exclaim!	mixed
The Independent	favorable
PopMatters	5/10 stars
RapReviews.com	7.5/10

Andy Kellman of AllMusic gave the album 3 stars out of 5, commenting that "Mighty Mi's beats are a good match for Vast, packing all the necessary grit and disorienting ambiance, but the album lacks The Cold Vein's dark edge." Nathan Rabin of The A.V. Club stated, "Mi is the sonic auteur behind Rap Show's grimy B-movie atmospherics, but Aire brings the verbal pyrotechnics."

IGN included it on the "Top 26 Albums of 2005" list.

== Track listing ==
No.	Title	Length
1.	"The Best Damn Rap Show"	2:08
2.	"What Goes Up"	3:51
3.	"Taboo"	3:52
4.	"The Workover"	4:09
5.	"Friendly Fire"	3:28
6.	"Fighter Pilots" (featuring Tame One)	3:57
7.	"Buck 50 Express"	4:26
8.	"Black Sunday"	3:12
9.	"Vintage"	4:01
10.	"Aire Maestro"	1:49
11.	"Buttafly Knife"	4:54
12.	"Off the Board"	1:05
Total length:		40:52

== Personnel ==
Credits adapted from liner notes.

- Vast Aire – vocals
- Mighty Mi – production, turntables, recording
- DJ Cip One – turntables (2)
- Tame One – vocals (6)
- Joey Raia – mixing
- Michael Perez-Cisneros – mastering
- B. Smith – design, illustration
- Trevor Traynor – photography
