= We Live: The Black Samurai =

EP by C-Rayz Walz
- Released: September 7, 2004
- Genre: Hip-hop
- Length: 38:09
- Label: Definitive Jux
- Producer: Khiladi; Belief; Trudeau; DJ Static; Dub-L; Cave Precise

C-Rayz Walz chronology
Ravipops (The Substance) (2003)	We Live: The Black Samurai (2004)	Year of the Beast (2005)

Professional ratings
Review scores
Source	Rating
AllHipHop	3.5/5
AllMusic	3.5/5 stars
Prefix	6.0/10

We Live: The Black Samurai is an EP by American rapper C-Rayz Walz. It was released on Definitive Jux in 2004.

== Critical reception ==
David Jeffries of AllMusic gave the EP 3.5 stars out of 5, saying: "Putting 'EP' on the cover keeps the collection from being over-judged, but hopefully won't keep it from being overlooked." Shawn Lawrence James of AllHipHop called it "a delicious appetizer for those craving food for thought in between his full length LPs." Nick Stillman of Prefix gave the EP a 6.0 out of 10, saying, "We Live shows no evidence of any great progression or downfall from a rapper who, at the very least, is consistently decent."

== Track listing ==
No.	Title	Producer(s)	Length
1.	"Opening Ceremony"	Khiladi	0:20
2.	"We Live (Belief Remix)"	Belief	4:17
3.	"Trudeau"	Trudeau	4:52
4.	"Showgun"	DJ Static	3:55
5.	"Crayzeebeat"	Khiladi	0:14
6.	"Crayzeerock" (featuring Lyrikill Da Observer)	Dub-L	4:58
7.	"Single Mothers"	Cave Precise	4:37
8.	"Amore"	Cave Precise	4:33
9.	"Metal Petals"	Khiladi	0:24
10.	"Rain Forever"	Dub-L	4:58
11.	"3 Card Molly"	Belief	4:41
12.	"Closing Ritual"	Khiladi	0:20
