= Ravipops (The Substance) =

Studio album by C-Rayz Walz
- Released: July 29, 2003
- Genre: Hip-hop
- Length: 69:51
- Label: Definitive Jux
- Producer: Malik Allah; Belief; R'Thentic; DJ Lord Ron; DJ Sean One; 4th Pyramid; DJ Etch a Sketch; Jo Chris; Ste-Lo; Wally What; Plain Pat; Black Panther

C-Rayz Walz chronology
Limelight (The Outroduction) (2003)	Ravipops (The Substance) (2003)	We Live: The Black Samurai (2004)

Professional ratings
Review scores
Source	Rating
AllMusic	3/5 stars
Exclaim!	mixed
Pitchfork	6.8/10
Prefix	8.0/10
RapReviews.com	9/10

Ravipops (The Substance) is a studio album by American rapper C-Rayz Walz. It was released on Definitive Jux in 2003.

== Critical reception ==
David Jeffries of AllMusic gave the album 3 stars out of 5, saying: "There's a new producer for practically every track, but the album flows well enough, keeping things more traditional than expected for a Definitive Jux release, and the freestyling ranges from biting to abstract." Meanwhile, Rollie Pemberton of Pitchfork gave the album a 6.8 out of 10, saying, "regardless of his anti-platinum rhyme campaign, Ravipops still seems to come off like a well-written commercial hustler album without the production values."

== Track listing ==
No.	Title	Producer(s)	Length
1.	"Floe"	Malik Allah	2:58
2.	"The Essence"	Belief	4:12
3.	"Guns and Butter" (featuring Natural K.A.W.S.)	R'Thentic	3:51
4.	"Protect My Family" (featuring Killa Kal)	DJ Lord Ron	4:20
5.	"Thug Melody"	Belief	4:16
6.	"'86"	DJ Sean One	3:57
7.	"The Lineup" (featuring Wordsworth, J-Treds, Thirstin Howl III, Vast Aire, Breezly Brewin, and MF Doom)	4th Pyramid	4:25
8.	"Buck 80"	DJ Etch a Sketch	4:21
9.	"Battle Me"	Jo Chris	4:34
10.	"Elephant Guns"	Belief	4:46
11.	"We Live"	Ste-Lo	4:30
12.	"Yeah" (featuring Natural K.A.W.S.)	Malik Allah	3:48
13.	"Seal Killa" (featuring 4th Pyramid and Malcolm Bix)	Wally What	3:58
14.	"Dead Buffalos"	Plain Pat	4:08
15.	"Camouflage"	Black Panther	4:30
16.	"3 Card Molly"	Belief	4:17
17.	"Revelations 15:2 Fuhks" (featuring Moses)		3:00
