= Megagraphitti =

Studio album by Vordul Mega
- Released: August 19, 2008
- Genre: Hip-hop
- Length: 54:54
- Label: Backwoodz Studioz
- Producer: Zach One; Opto; Bond; DJ Marmaduke; Bronze Nazareth; Lex Boogie; Sid Roams; Lostsun; Ravage; El-P; Essex Dogs

Vordul Mega chronology
The Revolution of Yung Havoks (2004)	Megagraphitti (2008)

Megagraphitti is the second solo studio album by American rapper Vordul Mega, one half of Cannibal Ox. It was released on Backwoodz Studioz in 2008.

== Critical reception ==
Professional ratings
Review scores
Source	Rating
PopMatters	6/10 stars
RapReviews.com	7/10
Washington City Paper	favorable

Andrew Martin of PopMatters commented that Vordul Mega "has developed an ever-changing flow and his lyrics remain solid and consistent." Ben Westhoff of Washington City Paper wrote, "Megagraphitti proves that Mega has hit on an idea that's as good now as it was in 2001: Call it end-of-the-world movie-score rap."

== Track listing ==
No.	Title	Producer(s)	Length
1.	"Stay Conscious"	Zach One	4:28
2.	"AK-47" (featuring Vast Aire)	Opto	5:12
3.	"Opium Scripts" (featuring Billy Woods)	Bond	2:54
4.	"Hattori Hanzo"	DJ Marmaduke	3:06
5.	"Air Battery" (featuring Tommy Gunn and Billy Woods)	Bond	2:56
6.	"Trigganomics"	Bronze Nazareth	3:55
7.	"Broken Halo" (featuring Invizzibl Men)	Lex Boogie	4:32
8.	"Light"	Bond	1:16
9.	"In the Mirror" (featuring Vast Aire and Karniege)	Sid Roams	3:48
10.	"Beautiful"	Lostsun	4:36
11.	"Learn"	Ravage	2:35
12.	"Peanut Butta Up"	DJ Marmaduke	3:28
13.	"Keep Livin'" (featuring Billy Woods)	El-P	4:46
14.	"Imani" (featuring Billy Woods)	Essex Dogs	3:54
15.	"Megagraphitti"	Zach One	3:28
Total length:			54:54
