= Rob Sonic =

American rapper

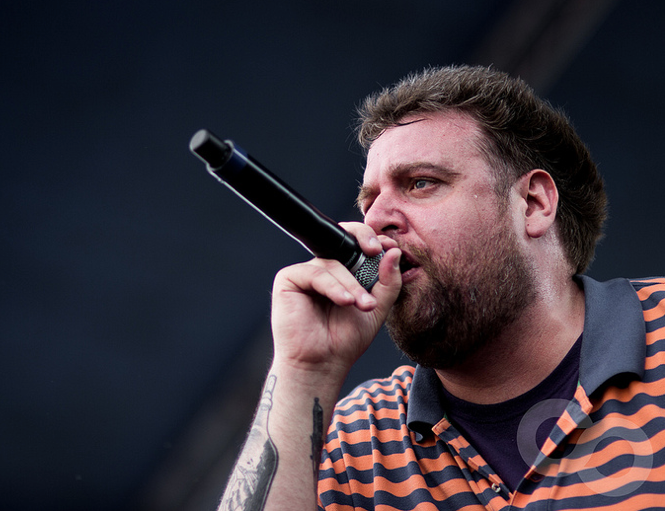
- Rob Sonic performing in 2012

Background information
- Also known as: Rob Smith, Rob Sonic, Bananas Foster, Bobby Freedom
- Born: Robert Charles Gardner Smith; Washington, D.C., U.S.
- Origin: The Bronx, New York, U.S.
- Genre: Hip-hop
- Occupations: Rapper; record producer
- Instruments: Vocals; sampler; synthesizer; guitar; bass guitar
- Years active: 1998–present
- Labels: Definitive Jux; OK-47; Skypimps Music
- Formerly of: Sonic Sum; Hail Mary Mallon
- Website: skypimps.bandcamp.com

Robert Smith, better known by his stage name Rob Sonic, is an American rapper and record producer from the Bronx, New York. He has been a member of the groups Sonic Sum and Hail Mary Mallon. He is a founder of the record label Skypimps Music.

== Biography ==
Rob Sonic is originally from Washington, D.C. As a child, he moved to New York. He started rapping at age 12.

In 2011, Smith released the album Are You Gonna Eat That? on Rhymesayers Entertainment with Aesop Rock and DJ Big Wiz under the alias Hail Mary Mallon. The group's second album, Bestiary, was released in 2014 on the same label.

In 2004, he released his debut solo studio album, Telicatessen, on Definitive Jux. In 2007, he released Sabotage Gigante on the label. He released Alice in Thunderdome in 2014, Defriender in 2018, and Latrinalia in 2021.

== Discography ==
=== Studio albums ===
- Telicatessen (2004)
- Sabotage Gigante (2007)
- Alice in Thunderdome (2014)
- Defriender (2018)
- Latrinalia (2021)

=== Compilation albums ===
- Barf (2017)

=== Singles ===
- "Death Vendor" / "Dylsexia" (2004)
- "Shoplift" (2004)
- "Fatman and Littleboy" / "The Over Under" (2006)
- "Rock the Convoy" (2007)
- "All the Drugs (Do Nothing)" (2017)
- "Couple Skate" (2017)
- "JJ Sad" (2018)
- "Frankie (Can't Relax)" (2018)
- "Ithaca" (2018)
- "All the Drugs: Ohio Dirt Mix" (2018)
- "Bikini" (2019)
- "Boca Raton" (2020)

=== Productions ===
- Aesop Rock – "Winners Take All" from Fast Cars, Danger, Fire and Knives (2005)
- Aesop Rock – "Dark Heart News" from None Shall Pass (2007)

=== Guest appearances ===
- The Infesticons – "Chase Theme" from Gun Hill Road (2000)
- El-P – "Truancy" from Fantastic Damage (2002)
- Funkstörung – "Mr. Important" from Disconnected (2004)
- Hangar 18 – "One Night at the Bar" (2004)
- C-Rayz Walz – "Walk Through" from Year of the Beast (2005)
- Blue Sky Black Death – "Long Division" from A Heap of Broken Images (2006)
- El-P – "Flyentology" from I'll Sleep When You're Dead (2007)
- Aesop Rock – "Dark Heart News" from None Shall Pass (2007)
- Tobacco – "Lick the Witch" from LA UTI (2010)
- Aesop Rock – "Dokken Rules" and "BMX" from Skelethon (2012)
- Illogic and Blockhead – "Nails" from Preparing for Capture (2012)
- Armand Hammer – "Post Haste" from Half Measures (2013)
- Onry Ozzborn – "Not Really" from Duo (2016)
- Aesop Rock – "Forward Compatibility Engine" from Integrated Tech Solutions (2023)
- Sal Crosby & Bons Reeb (feat. Denmark Vessey) – "Fear of" (2024)

=== Compilation appearances ===
- "F.U. for Failure Ugly" on Definitive Jux Presents II (2002)
- "Dylsexia" on Definitive Jux Presents III (2004)
- "Shoplift (El-P Remix)" on Definitive Jux Teaser 2005 (2005)
- "Brand New Vandals" on Definitive Swim (2007)
- "Domestic Animals" on Definitive Jux Presents IV (2009)
