= Hail Mary Mallon =

American hip hop group

- Origin: New York City, New York, U.S.
- Genres: Hip hop
- Years active: 2009–2018
- Label: Rhymesayers
- Past members: Aesop Rock; Rob Sonic; DJ Big Wiz

Hail Mary Mallon was an American hip-hop group consisting of Aesop Rock, Rob Sonic, and DJ Big Wiz. The group's name is a reference to Typhoid Mary. Their first release was the song "D-Up", featured on the compilation album, Definitive Jux Presents 4.

== History ==
Aesop Rock and Rob Sonic first heard of each other in the mid to late 1990s through the New York City hip hop scene. Soon after, the two would become label mates on El-P's independent hip hop label Definitive Jux, with DJ Big Wiz contributing to Aesop Rock and Rob Sonic's earlier albums.

On April 20, 2011, it was announced that Rhymesayers Entertainment would release Hail Mary Mallon's debut album Are You Gonna Eat That? A music video for the album's first single, "Smock", was also announced that same day. Are You Gonna Eat That? was released digitally on May 3, 2011, and on CD and double vinyl on June 7, 2011, by Rhymesayers.

On May 13, 2014, Aesop Rock announced via his Facebook page that Hail Mary Mallon had finished mixing a new album with an undisclosed release date.

On September 9, 2014, the first single, "Jonathan", was released on the Rhymesayers website, as well as the release date for their second album, Bestiary, which was released on November 11, 2014.

On November 11, 2018, Rob Sonic announced via his Twitter account that there would not be another Hail Mary Mallon album. The tweet has since been deleted.

== Discography ==
=== Albums ===
- Are You Gonna Eat That? (2011)
- Bestiary (2014)

=== Singles ===
- "Smock" (2011)
- "Grubstake" (2011)
- "Garfield" (2011)
- "Breakdance Beach" (2011)
- "Jonathan" (2014)
