= Diabolical Fun =

Studio album by Illogic
- Released: March 21, 2009
- Genre: Hip hop
- Length: 40:58
- Label: Weightless Recordings
- Producer: Ill Poetic

Illogic chronology
Celestial Clockwork (2004)	Diabolical Fun (2009)	A Man Who Thinks with His Own Mind (2016)

Professional ratings
Review scores
Source	Rating
Cokemachineglow	unfavorable
HipHopDX	3.5/5 stars
RapReviews.com	7.5/10

Diabolical Fun is the fourth solo studio album by American rapper Illogic. It was released in 2009. The album was entirely produced by Ill Poetic.

== Critical reception ==
Chet Betz of Cokemachineglow said: "Stellar closing track and a few highlights aside, Diabolical Fun sounds like an artist working just a little too far outside his comfort zone, trying to force his pentagonal peg into a round hole."

== Track listing ==
No.	Title	Length
1.	"What's My Name?"	2:23
2.	"Diabolical Fun"	2:22
3.	"Violent Verbiage"	2:58
4.	"What Happened"	3:51
5.	"I Know You"	3:24
6.	"Let's Go"	4:14
7.	"Crash" (featuring Ill Poetic)	3:09
8.	"Get Up or Get Down"	3:18
9.	"Time"	3:10
10.	"Right Here"	3:08
11.	"Feel the Beat"	4:58
12.	"Walk into the Sunset" (featuring Ill Poetic)	4:03
