= Adventures in Counter-Culture =

Studio album by Blueprint
- Released: April 5, 2011
- Genre: Hip-hop
- Length: 58:37
- Label: Rhymesayers
- Producer: Blueprint

Blueprint chronology
| Sign Language (2009) | Adventures in Counter-Culture (2011) | Deleted Scenes (2012) |

Adventures in Counter-Culture is a solo studio album by American rapper and record producer Blueprint. It was released on April 5, 2011 through Rhymesayers Entertainment, marking his second album for the label. In the United States, the album reached number 52 on the Top R&B/Hip-Hop Albums and number 9 on the Heatseekers Albums charts.

== Critical reception ==
Professional ratings
Aggregate scores
| Source | Rating |
|---|---|
| Metacritic | 77/100 |
Review scores
| Source | Rating |
| HipHopDX | 4/5 |
| Pitchfork | 6.6/10 |
| PopMatters | 7/10 |
| RapReviews | 6.5/10 |
| Tom Hull | B+ |

Adventures in Counter-Culture was met with universal acclaim from music critics. At Metacritic, which assigns a normalized rating out of 100 to reviews from mainstream publications, the album received an average score of 77, based on four reviews.

Jake Paine of HipHopDX resumed: "while underground hip-hop peers such as Cage and Zion I have struggled in their efforts to expand genres, one of Ohio's best widens his scope with a fiery intensity and a welcomed sound". Kiel Hauck of PopMatters wrote: "it's not to say that Adventures in Counter Culture is nothing but filler, far from it. The album ebbs and flows through its 15 tracks, each one playing part in a larger role of capturing Blueprint's purpose, which is to create a hip-hop album that goes against the grain of today's formula for success". Ian Cohen of Pitchfork concluded: "Blueprint can be so effective when he's down to earth, it's a shame he feels the need to step up on a soapbox".

== Track listing ==
| No. | Title | Length |
|---|---|---|
| 1. | "Five Years Ago" | 1:22 |
| 2. | "Go Hard or Go Home (Printnificence)" | 3:49 |
| 3. | "Automatic" | 3:14 |
| 4. | "Keep Bouncing" | 3:49 |
| 5. | "Wanna Be Like You" | 4:31 |
| 6. | "My Culture" | 4:09 |
| 7. | "Mind, Body & Soul" (featuring Angelica Lee) | 5:03 |
| 8. | "So Alive" | 3:51 |
| 9. | "Stole Our Yesterday" | 4:48 |
| 10. | "Radio-Inactive" | 4:16 |
| 11. | "Welcome Home" | 4:23 |
| 12. | "Fly Away" | 3:46 |
| 13. | "The Clouds" | 3:22 |
| 14. | "Rise & Fall" | 3:52 |
| 15. | "The Other Side" | 4:22 |
| Total length: | | 58:37 |

Deluxe Edition
| No. | Title | Length |
|---|---|---|
| 16. | "Soul Music" | 5:48 |
| 17. | "Who Do You Love" (featuring Slug and Illogic) | 4:47 |

== Charts ==
Chart performance for Adventures in Counter-Culture
| Chart (2011) | Peak position |
|---|---|
| US Top R&B/Hip-Hop Albums (Billboard) | 52 |
| US Heatseekers Albums (Billboard) | 9 |
