= Brand New Bein' =

Studio album by Sadat X
- Released: May 5, 2009
- Recorded: 2008–09
- Genre: Hip-hop
- Label: Ground Original; Cold Heat Entertainment
- Producer: DJ JS-One; Johnny Walker

Sadat X chronology
Generation X (2008)	Brand New Bein' (2009)	Wild Cowboys II (2010)

Professional ratings
Review scores
Source	Rating
AllMusic	3.5/5 stars
HipHopDX	3.5/5
RapReviews	6/10

Brand New Bein' is the fourth solo studio album by American rapper Sadat X. It was released on May 5, 2009, through Ground Original/Cold Heat Entertainment. Production was handled entirely by DJ JS-1 and Johnny Walker. It features guest appearances from Jak Danielz, Craig G, Buckshot, CL Smooth, C-Rayz Walz, KRS-One, Okwerdz, Poison Pen, Rahzel, Twan, and fellow Brand Nubian members Grand Puba and Lord Jamar.

== Track listing ==
No.	Title	Length
1.	"All for One '08"	4:00
2.	"Nuthin'" (featuring CL Smooth)	4:03
3.	"Go Slow" (featuring Jak Danielz and Twan)	4:34
4.	"Breath" (Interlude)	0:44
5.	"Blow Up Da Spot" (featuring KRS-One and Rahzel)	4:56
6.	"The Natural"	3:41
7.	"Lyrics?" (featuring Craig G)	4:07
8.	"Bullseye" (featuring Buckshot and Jak Danielz)	4:18
9.	"Goin' Back"	3:48
10.	"Brand New Bein'" (performed by Brand Nubian)	4:22
11.	"Unforgettable" (featuring Poison Pen and Jak Danielz)	3:50
12.	"Wait a While" (Interlude)	0:34
13.	"Teach the Children"	2:52
14.	"Gamer" (featuring C-Rayz Walz and Okwerdz)	3:45
15.	"Smallest Violin" (featuring Craig G and Jak Danielz)	4:45
16.	"I Can't Forget..." (Outro)	4:08
