= Push Button Objects =

American hip-hop producer

- Also known as: Guineo
- Born: Edgar Farinas; December 7, 1974 (age 51)
- Origin: Miami, Florida, United States
- Genres: Hip-hop, glitch hop
- Occupation: Producer
- Labels: Chocolate Industries, Skam Records, Schematic Records

Edgar Farinas (born December 7, 1974), better known by his stage name Push Button Objects (abbreviated PBO), is an American hip-hop producer from Miami, Florida. He is one half of Ko-Wreck Technique along with DJ Craze. Push Button Objects has released recordings for labels such as Chocolate Industries, Skam Records and Schematic Records.

== Career ==
In 1997, Push Button Objects released the self-titled debut EP, Push Button Objects, on Schematic Records.

In 2000, his first album, Dirty Dozen, was released on Chocolate Industries. It contained material from two EPs, Cash and Half Dozen, as well as previously unreleased tracks.

In 2003, Ghetto Blaster, his album featuring vocal contributions from Del tha Funkee Homosapien, Mr. Lif, Akrobatik, Aesop Rock, Vast Aire, and Doseone, was released on Chocolate Industries.

== Style and influences ==
Push Button Objects's musical style has been compared to Prefuse 73 and RJD2.

== Discography ==
=== Albums ===
- Dirty Dozen (2000)
- Ghetto Blaster (2003)

=== EPs ===
- Push Button Objects (1997)
- Cash (1997)
- Unauthorized (1998)
- Half Dozen (1999)
- A Day in a Life (1999)
- Ko-Wrecktion (1999) (with DJ Craze, as Ko-Wreck Technique)
- Ko-Wrecktion Remixes (2000) (with DJ Craze, as Ko-Wreck Technique)
- Tosstones (2000) (as Guineo)
- 360 Degrees Remixes (2001)

=== Singles ===
- "360 Degrees" (2000)
- "Fly (You Ain't)" (2002)
- "360 Degrees (Prefuse 73 Remix)" (2003)
