= Capture the Sun (Illogic and Blockhead album) =

Studio album by Illogic and Blockhead
- Released: April 16, 2013
- Genre: Hip hop
- Length: 50:58
- Label: Man Bites Dog Records
- Producer: Blockhead

Illogic and Blockhead chronology
Preparing for Capture 2 (2012)	Capture the Sun (2013)	After Capture (2013)

Capture the Sun is a collaborative studio album by American rapper Illogic and American hip hop producer Blockhead. It was released on Man Bites Dog Records on April 16, 2013.

The title derives from a quote Illogic's grandmother told him, "that all things delayed are not denied, which basically means anything you run into might not always happen when you want it to but if you continue to work for it good things will follow."

== Critical reception ==
Professional ratings
Review scores
Source	Rating
HipHopDX	4/5 stars
RapReviews.com	10/10
Spectrum Culture	3.5/5 stars
XXL	L

Chaz Kangas of Spectrum Culture wrote, "Blockhead's production is layered, textured and tailor made for Illogic's mood, and Illogic knows how to accentuate the environment Blockhead's planted him in by weaving his flow through his rhyme choices like a lantern through the deep woods."

HipHopDX included it on the "Top 25 Albums of 2013" list.

== Track listing ==
No.	Title	Length
1.	"Neva Heard"	2:10
2.	"Pillow of Dreams"	3:49
3.	"Capture the Sun" (featuring Slug)	2:29
4.	"Beautiful Sunday" (featuring Taylor Francis)	4:12
5.	"Bridges"	1:53
6.	"Live from the Horizon"	3:42
7.	"Justified" (featuring Blueprint)	2:55
8.	"Where's the Exit"	3:31
9.	"She Loves It"	2:14
10.	"Finally Free"	2:54
11.	"One Way Ticket" (featuring Zero Star)	3:57
12.	"Atlantis Depth"	2:42
13.	"Smile" (featuring Abstract Rude)	3:02
14.	"Last Breath (Family Fabric)"	3:45
15.	"Blindfold"	4:12
16.	"Lighthouse" (featuring Kristoff Krane)	3:32
Total length:		50:58
