= Dueces Wild =

Studio album by Vast Aire
- Released: June 24, 2008
- Genre: Hip-hop
- Length: 50:45
- Label: One Records; Gracie Productions
- Producer: Le Parasite; Melodius Monk; Aspect One; Walter Rocktight; Pete Rock; Oh No; DJ Priority; Falside; Thanos

Vast Aire chronology
| The Best Damn Rap Show (2005) | Dueces Wild (2008) | OX 2010: A Street Odyssey (2011) |

Dueces Wild is the second solo studio album by American rapper Vast Aire, one half of the duo Cannibal Ox. It was released on One Records and Gracie Productions in 2008.

== Critical reception ==
Professional ratings
Review scores
| Source | Rating |
|---|---|
| AllMusic | favorable |
| Exclaim! | mixed |
| Exclaim! | mixed |
| HipHopDX | 3.0/5 |
| Pitchfork | 8.0/10 |
| RapReviews.com | 8.5/10 |

Matt Rinaldi of AllMusic gave the album a favorable review, describing it as "another elevated LP for listeners who prefer their rap hard-boiled and brainy as hell." Jake Paine of HipHopDX gave the album a 3.0 out of 5, writing: "Regardless of seasoned or newcomer production personnel, Deuces Wild bears a consistency that feels as if one musical mind made it." Ben Westhoff of Pitchfork gave the album an 8.0 out of 10, commenting that "what's most impressive about the work is that it succeeds without succumbing to the trends of hipster rap, emo rap, or radio rap."

XXL placed it at number 6 on the "Top 10 Rap Albums of 2008" list.

== Track listing ==
| No. | Title | Producer(s) | Length |
|---|---|---|---|
| 1. | "You Know (You Like It)" | Le Parasite | 4:04 |
| 2. | "T.V. Land" | Melodious Monk | 2:37 |
| 3. | "Take Two" | Melodious Monk | 3:10 |
| 4. | "The Dynamic Duo" (featuring Geechi Suede) | Aspect One | 5:20 |
| 5. | "Gimme Dat Mic" (featuring Copywrite) | Walter Rocktight | 3:50 |
| 6. | "Mecca and the Ox" (featuring Vordul Mega) | Pete Rock | 3:29 |
| 7. | "Back 2 Basics" | Melodious Monk | 3:46 |
| 8. | "Lunchroom Rap (It's Nothing)" | Oh No | 3:48 |
| 9. | "When Starz Fail" (featuring Double A.B., Thanos, Swave Sevah, and Karniege) | DJ Priority | 5:11 |
| 10. | "The Crush" | Falside | 4:34 |
| 11. | "Shu (The God of Aire)" | Thanos | 3:55 |
| 12. | "Graveyard Shift" (featuring Genesis) | Melodious Monk | 3:16 |
| 13. | "The Man Without Fear" | Melodious Monk | 3:45 |
| Total length: | | | 50:45 |

== Personnel ==
Credits adapted from liner notes.

- Vast Aire – vocals
- Le Parasite – production (1)
- Melodious Monk – production (2, 3, 7, 12, 13)
- Geechi Suede – vocals (4)
- Aspect One – production (4)
- Copywrite – vocals (5)
- Walter Rocktight – production (5)
- Vordul Mega – vocals (6)
- Pete Rock – production (6)
- Oh No – production (8)
- Double A.B. – vocals (9)
- Thanos – vocals (9)
- Swave Sevah – vocals (9)
- Karniege – vocals (9)
- DJ Priority – production (9)
- Falside – production (10)
- Thanos – production (11)
- Genesis – vocals (12)
- Joel Myer – mixing
- See Russell – art direction, design
- Raoul Sinier – original art illustration
