= 1988 (Blueprint album) =

Studio album by Blueprint
- Released: March 29, 2005
- Genre: Hip-hop
- Length: 49:13
- Label: Rhymesayers
- Producer: Blueprint

Blueprint chronology
Chamber Music (2004)	1988 (2005)	Iron & Niacin (2006)

Singles from 1988
- 1. "Boombox" Released: March 8, 2005

1988 is the third studio album by American rapper and record producer Blueprint. It was released on March 29, 2005, via Rhymesayers Entertainment. Self-produced, it features cameo appearances from Aesop Rock and CJ the Cynic.

== Critical reception ==
Professional ratings
Aggregate scores
Source	Rating
Metacritic	83/100
Review scores
Source	Rating
AllHipHop	4/5 stars
AllMusic	3.5/5 stars
Cokemachineglow	77/100%
Pitchfork	6/10
PopMatters	8/10
Prefix	7/10
RapReviews	10/10
The Village Voice	A−

1988 was met with universal acclaim from music critics. At Metacritic, which assigns a normalized rating out of 100 to reviews from mainstream publications, the album received an average score of 83, based on nine reviews.

John Book of RapReviews gave the album a perfect ten-out-of-ten score, calling it "a true original not to the game, but to rap music at its best". Robert Christgau of The Village Voice wrote: "though he's the kind of rhymer who scans "another good record with bad distribution" all too swimmingly, the hip-hop don't stop". Stefan Braidwood of PopMatters has found "on 1988, Blueprint delivers a guide to a sparkplug of a year, capturing its essence whilst feeling bang up to date". Chet Betz of Cokemachineglow stated: "these songs are enjoyable and beautiful and pure hip-hop --- glittering, hard diamonds that hopefully won't get buried in the underground scene’'s mounds of coal". AllMusic's Todd Kristel noticed that the rapper "isn't really trying to break new ground on this relatively accessible collection of concise, melodic songs, but he is trying to add something to his influences instead of settling for a nostalgia trip". Rafael Martinez of Prefix wrote: "Blueprint could have cut-and-pasted his way through 1988, recycling hooks, beats and samples, but he clearly took his time and laid out his vision".

== Track listing ==
All tracks are written by Albert Shepard.

No.	Title	Length
1.	"Introduction"	0:27
2.	"Anything Is Possible"	1:29
3.	"1988"	3:04
4.	"Inner-City-Native-Son"	3:22
5.	"Tramp"	4:45
6.	"Boombox"	5:18
7.	"Trouble on My Mind"	3:39
8.	"Lo-Fi Funk" (featuring Aesop Rock)	3:31
9.	"Big Girls Need Love Too"	4:02
10.	"Fresh"	2:48
11.	"Where's Your Girlfriend At?"	2:57
12.	"Kill Me First" (featuring CJ the Cynic)	4:58
13.	"Liberated / Who You Talkin' To?"	8:53
Total length:		49:13
