= Greenhouse (group) =

American hip-hop group

- Also known as: Greenhouse Effect
- Origin: Columbus, Ohio, United States
- Genre: Hip-hop
- Years active: 1997–present
- Label: Weightless Recordings
- Members: Blueprint; Illogic
- Past members: Inkwel; Manifest

Greenhouse is an American hip-hop group from Columbus, Ohio. Originally formed as Greenhouse Effect by Blueprint, Inkwel, and Manifest, it now consists of Blueprint and Illogic.

== History ==
In 1997, Greenhouse Effect was formed by Blueprint, Inkwel, and Manifest. In 1999, the group released the debut EP, Up to Speed. The first album, Life Sentences, was released in 2003.

After Inkwel's leaving the group, Blueprint and Manifest released the album, Columbus or Bust, in 2005. In 2009, it was announced that Illogic replaced Manifest and that Greenhouse Effect changed the name to Greenhouse.

In 2009, Blueprint and Illogic released the Electric Purgatory: Part One EP, which was followed by the Electric Purgatory: Part Two EP in the next year. In 2013, Greenhouse released the album, Bend But Don't Break.

== Members ==
Current

- Blueprint - rapper, producer
- Illogic - rapper

Former

- Inkwel - rapper
- Manifest - rapper

== Discography ==
Albums

- Life Sentences (2003)
- Columbus or Bust (2005)
- Bend But Don't Break (2013)

EPs

- Up to Speed (1999)
- Greenhouse Effect vs. Radiohead (2005)
- Electric Purgatory: Part One (2009)
- Electric Purgatory: Part Two (2010)

Singles

- "Smile" (2010)
