= Sabotage Gigante =

Studio album by Rob Sonic
- Released: September 25, 2007
- Genre: Hip hop
- Length: 42:21
- Label: Definitive Jux
- Producer: Rob Sonic

Rob Sonic chronology
Telicatessen (2004)	Sabotage Gigante (2007)	Alice in Thunderdome (2014)

Singles from Sabotage Gigante
- 1. "Rock the Convoy" Released: September 4, 2007

Professional ratings
Review scores
Source	Rating
AllMusic	4/5 stars
Exclaim!	mixed
Pitchfork Media	6.9/10
PopMatters	3/10 stars
XLR8R	8/10

Sabotage Gigante is the second studio album by American hip hop artist Rob Sonic. It was released on Definitive Jux in 2007. The album featured guest appearances from Rob Sonic's Definitive Jux labelmate Aesop Rock and from Busdriver. It is also fully produced by Rob Sonic.

== Reception ==
Nate Patrin of Pitchfork Media gave the album a 6.9 out of 10, saying, "Sabotage Gigante has been said to be [Rob] Sonic's political album, at least in a more wide-ranging and universal way than Telicatessen's the-personal-is-political themes, but there are so many generalities, abstractions, reappropriated slogans, moments of quadruplespeak, and pseudo-non-sequitur asides that much of the listener's time between headphones is spent trying to untangle it all."

On October 23, 2007, "Brand New Vandals" was chosen by KEXP-FM as their Song of the Day.

== Popular culture ==
In 2010, the song Brand New Vandals was featured in the video game Skate 3.

== Track listing ==
No.	Title	Length
1.	"Teeth Eat Her"	3:57
2.	"Brand New Vandals"	3:49
3.	"The Over Under"	3:38
4.	"Mother of All Bombs"	3:58
5.	"Ready Aim Shoot"	3:22
6.	"Rock the Convoy"	3:58
7.	"Smoke If You Got'um" (featuring Aesop Rock)	4:22
8.	"Dead As Disco"	3:48
9.	"Fat Man & Little Boy"	4:47
10.	"Spy Hunter" (featuring Busdriver)	2:49
11.	"A Cold Cold War"	3:51
