= Unforeseen Shadows =

Studio album by Illogic
- Released: May 9, 2000
- Genre: Hip hop
- Length: 54:36
- Label: Weightless Recordings
- Producer: Blueprint

Illogic chronology
Unforeseen Shadows (2000)	Got Lyrics? (2001)

Professional ratings
Review scores
Source	Rating
AllMusic	4/5 stars
RapReviews.com	9.5/10
Urban Smarts	87/100

Unforeseen Shadows is the first solo studio album by American rapper Illogic. It was released in 2000.

== Critical reception ==
Dan Gizzi of AllMusic gave the album 4 stars out of 5, calling it "an impressive debut album." He said, "Illogic is impressive on the mic; he has a creative flow and good lyrics."

In 2015, Fact placed it at number 93 on the "100 Best Indie Hip-Hop Records of All Time" list.

== Track listing ==
No.	Title	Length
1.	"Introduction"	1:46
2.	"What It Takes"	3:29
3.	"Me vs. Myself" (featuring I)	4:58
4.	"Lioness" (featuring Lioness)	1:06
5.	"Blaow!!" (featuring Lioness)	4:33
6.	"Favorite Things Intro"	0:37
7.	"Favorite Things" (featuring Blueprint)	4:04
8.	"Check It Out"	4:13
9.	"Blacksmif" (featuring Blacksmif)	1:06
10.	"Illogistics"	3:48
11.	"Angel"	4:49
12.	"Dose One" (featuring Doseone)	1:55
13.	"Hate in a Puddle"	5:34
14.	"Blueprint"	1:43
15.	"Tale of a Griot"	5:56
16.	"Cinderella Complex" (featuring Blueprint)	6:06
