= Deleted Scenes (album) =

Studio album by Blueprint
- Released: October 16, 2012
- Genre: Hip hop
- Length: 54:41
- Label: Weightless Recordings
- Producer: Blueprint

Blueprint chronology
Adventures in Counter-Culture (2011)	Deleted Scenes (2012)	Respect the Architect (2014)

Professional ratings
Review scores
Source	Rating
HipHopDX	3.5/5 stars
Potholes in My Blog	3/5 stars

Deleted Scenes is a studio album by American hip hop musician Blueprint. It was released on Weightless Recordings in 2012.

== Track listing ==
No.	Title	Length
1.	"Starting Out"	1:07
2.	"Takin' It"	3:26
3.	"Get Right" (featuring Dominique Larue)	4:10
4.	"The America Dream" (featuring Adoria)	4:07
5.	"True Love" (featuring Angelica Lee)	3:53
6.	"Body Movin'"	2:05
7.	"Never Grow Old" (featuring Angelica Lee)	4:01
8.	"Bells & Whistles"	3:52
9.	"The Mask"	4:54
10.	"Bartenders" (featuring Zero Star)	3:59
11.	"Babies Got Guns"	2:38
12.	"I Wanna Go" (featuring Nina D)	3:48
13.	"Senseless"	4:09
14.	"Leave Me Alone" (featuring Terry Troutman of Zapp)	4:35
15.	"Packt Like"	3:55
