= Sonic Sum =

American hip-hop group

- Origin: The Bronx, New York City, U.S.
- Genre: Hip-hop
- Years active: 1998–2004
- Labels: Ozone Music; Tri-Eight; Definitive Jux; A Night on Canopy
- Members: Rob Sonic; Fred Ones; Eric M.O.; Preservation

Sonic Sum was an American hip-hop group based in Bronx, New York. It consisted of Rob Sonic, Fred Ones, Eric M.O., and Preservation. The group was described by CMJ New Music Monthly as "hip-hop's Radiohead".

In 1999, Sonic Sum released the first studio album, The Sanity Annex, on Ozone Music. It has received critical acclaim worldwide. XLR8R called it "one of the most criminally slept-on albums of the indie hip-hop boom". In 2002, the group released the second studio album, Films, exclusively in Japan. It was released in the US in 2004 and released on Definitive Jux in 2008.

== Discography ==
Studio albums

- The Sanity Annex (1999)
- Films (2004)

EPs

- Plaster Man (2002)
- Operazor (2003)

Singles

- "Downtown Maze" / "Skypirate" (1998)
- "Callarama Gala" / "Flatlands" (1999)
- "Himbro St." / "It's an Ashtray" (2000)
- "Rocket" / "Oscillator" (2001)
- "Films" (2003)
