= Cosmo Baker =

American music producer

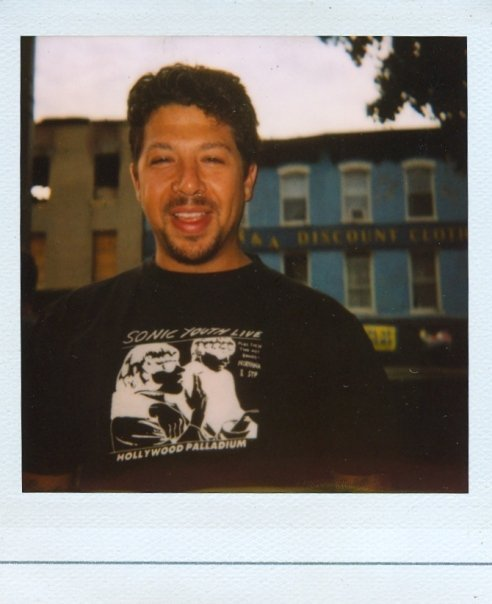

Cosmo Baker is an East Coast based American DJ, music producer, turntablist, entrepreneur, educator and activist.

At the age of 16 he was playing at many of the city's nightclubs, including Revival, Sugarcube, and Silk City, holding one of the original resident spots alongside King Britt at the Back 2 Basics party.

In 1996 Baker created The Remedy, a weekly hip-hop event based in Philadelphia. Together with his long time partner Rich Medina, The Remedy quickly became one of the epicenters of global hip-hop culture, being deemed by hip-hop impresario Bobbito Garcia to be "the dopest continuous weekly hip-hop jam in the United States". Over the course of 7+ years The Remedy hosted a lineup of diverse talent such as MF Doom, DJ Jazzy Jeff, Goldie, Coldcut, DJ AM, J Dilla & Slum Village, Madlib, Common, Black Thought, Questlove, Kurupt, Pharoahe Monch, Bahamadia, Prince Paul, Kid Koala, DJ Craze, DJ Spinna and many more. To this day Cosmo still produces events under the Remedy brand.

In 2003 Baker was one of the founders of The Rub, a Brooklyn based party and DJ collective. He left the group in 2012.

Baker has toured with Redman, Pharoahe Monch, Brand Nubian, Crooklyn Dodgers, DJ Premier, A-Trak, Roy Davis, Jr. and many others. He has toured in over 50 different countries on 5 continents.

Baker has performed with, opened for or played alongside a wide list of artists such as Jay-Z, Drake, The Roots, ASAP Rocky, Black Eyed Peas, Erykah Badu, Aloe Blacc, Janelle Monáe, Pitbull, Ty Dolla Sign, Trey Songz, Wu-Tang Clan, Run-DMC, De La Soul, Public Enemy, N.E.R.D., Sharon Jones & the Dap-Kings, Santigold, M.I.A., Dev Hynes, Thundercat, BadBadNotGood, Moses Sumney, The Chemical Brothers, Moby, LCD Soundsystem, MSTRKRFT, Justice, MGMT, Chromeo, Hercules and Love Affair, Death Cab for Cutie, Band of Horses, Blonde Redhead and many more.

As a DJ, Baker has played alongside or opened for Biz Markie D-Nice, Diplo, Z-Trip, Mark Ronson, Kevin Parker, Frankie Knuckles, Tony Humphries, Steve Aoki, Mix Master Mike, Gilles Peterson, DJ Drama, Just Blaze, DJ Scratch and many others.

As of 2022 Baker lives in Philadelphia, Pennsylvania.
