= Got Lyrics? =

Studio album by Illogic
- Released: November 20, 2001
- Genre: Hip hop
- Length: 48:20
- Label: Weightless Recordings
- Producer: Blueprint

Illogic chronology
Unforeseen Shadows (2000)	Got Lyrics? (2001)	Celestial Clockwork (2004)

Professional ratings
Review scores
Source	Rating
AllMusic	2/5 stars
RapReviews.com	7/10
UKHH.com	favorable
Urban Smarts	81/100

Got Lyrics? is the second solo studio album by American rapper Illogic. It was released in 2001.

== Critical reception ==
Brian O'Neill of AllMusic gave the album 2 stars out of 5, saying, "the production is not very innovative or invigorating." He added: "Get Illogic an innovative producer who's unafraid to take chances and the MC could make some noise, because he certainly has more than enough prowess behind the mic."

== Track listing ==
No.	Title	Length
1.	"Introduction"	1:02
2.	"Got Lyrics?"	2:51
3.	"Stop Lyin'"	3:54
4.	"The Name Game"	1:57
5.	"Pure Form"	4:30
6.	"The Countdown"	0:24
7.	"Figment of My Concentration"	4:01
8.	"Too Many Times"	3:56
9.	"Day by Day"	4:33
10.	"Screenplay"	4:55
11.	"Break Bread" (featuring Blueprint)	16:09
