= Alice in Thunderdome =

Studio album by Rob Sonic
- Released: August 26, 2014
- Genre: Hip hop
- Length: 37:12
- Label: OK-47 Records
- Producer: Rob Sonic; Aesop Rock; Edison

Rob Sonic chronology
| Sabotage Gigante (2007) | Alice in Thunderdome (2014) | Defriender (2018) |

Professional ratings
Review scores
| Source | Rating |
|---|---|
| Syffal | 9/10 |

Alice in Thunderdome is the third studio album by American hip hop artist Rob Sonic. It was released on OK-47 Records on August 26, 2014.

== Music ==
Alice in Thunderdome is the first Rob Sonic album to feature producers other than Sonic. Production contributors are Aesop Rock and Edison. Guest appearances include rappers Aesop Rock and Breeze Brewin.

== Track listing ==
| No. | Title | Producer | Length |
|---|---|---|---|
| 1. | "Jesus Christ Super Tramp" | Rob Sonic | 3:33 |
| 2. | "Alice In Thunderdome" | Rob Sonic | 3:40 |
| 3. | "GORF" | Rob Sonic | 2:51 |
| 4. | "Freezer Food" | Rob Sonic | 3:39 |
| 5. | "Kill Joy" (featuring Aesop Rock) | Edison | 2:48 |
| 6. | "Everything Bagel" | Edison | 4:02 |
| 7. | "Happyland Disco" | Aesop Rock | 3:32 |
| 8. | "Not For Nothing" (featuring Breeze Brewin) | Edison | 3:00 |
| 9. | "Student Bodies" | Rob Sonic | 3:14 |
| 10. | "Rock Paper Scissors" | Rob Sonic | 3:23 |
| 11. | "Pep Rally" | Rob Sonic | 3:30 |
| Total length: | | | 37:12 |
