= The Cold Vein =

Studio album by Cannibal Ox
- Released: May 15, 2001
- Genre: Hip-hop
- Length: 73:45
- Label: Definitive Jux, iHipHop Distribution (2013 reissue)
- Producer: El-P

Cannibal Ox chronology
The Cold Vein (2001)	Blade of the Ronin (2015)

Singles from The Cold Vein
- 1. "Vein" Released: April 2001; 2. "The F-Word" Released: September 2001

The Cold Vein is the debut studio album by American hip-hop duo Cannibal Ox. It was produced by El-P and released on his Definitive Jux label on May 15, 2001. The album has since been reissued by iHipHop Distribution.

== Release ==
The Cold Vein was the first full-length album to be released on former Company Flow member El-P's newly founded Definitive Jux record label, and its release was preceded by a significant amount of hype, particularly within the hip-hop community. In late 2000, a split double vinyl single was released by Definitive Jux, containing three new songs by Company Flow and two tracks taken from The Cold Vein: "Iron Galaxy" and "Straight Off the D.I.C.". These songs also appeared on the label compilation album Def Jux Presents, released on March 20, 2001. The first single, "Vein", was released in April 2001 with "A B-Boy's Alpha" serving as its b-side. The album was released on May 15, 2001.

An instrumental companion to the album entitled El-P Presents Cannibal Oxtrumentals was released on March 19, 2002, on Definitive Jux. AllMusic contributor Victor W. Valdivia wrote: "Mainly, the album sounds as if it were the soundtrack for an unmade film, much as the work Eno made in the 1970s, since the tracks have a distinct cinematic quality that allows them to cohere and flow beautifully."

== Critical reception ==
Professional ratings
Review scores
Source	Rating
AllMusic	4.5/5 stars
Alternative Press	8/10
The Boston Phoenix	3.5/4 stars
HipHopDX	5/5
NME	9/10
Pitchfork	8.3/10
Rolling Stone	3.5/5 stars
The Rolling Stone Album Guide	4/5 stars
Spin	7/10
Uncut	5/5 stars

The Cold Vein was well received by critics, drawing many favorable comparisons to the 36 Chambers-era Wu-Tang Clan. Many praised El-P's production work, with CMJ contributor Brian Coleman writing, "Producer El-P of Company Flow gives this Harlem-bred and Brooklyn-based vocal duo of Vast Aire and Shamar what usually sounds like a full goth orchestra perched in a dank basement, with thick synth strings, simulated outer-space found-sounds and choppy, pounding drums." AllMusic contributor Sam Samuelson wrote, "El-P (a serious candidate for producer of the year) lays out some of the most lushly intriguing sounds and beats that feel as herky-jerky as they sound gilded with silk."

The album was also noted for its profound lyrical content; many critics and fans felt Vast Aire's and Vordul Mega's lyrics painted a vivid picture of a poverty-stricken New York. Gavin Mueller of Stylus Magazine wrote about "The F-Word", a song addressing unrequited love: "Moments like these show not only the skill of Can Ox's MCs, but the potential for hip-hop lyrics to work on as many levels as the finest English poetry." Later placing the album at number 17 on its list of the top 50 albums of 2000–2005, the publication wrote:

Vast and Vordul work wonders on the mic, of course—particularly Vast, who steals most of the album's tracks with his charismatic delivery and clever wordplay. But it's the beats that give the album its unique stamp. The muted five-note motif in "Iron Galaxy"'s verses; the wandering keyboard lines and muffled vocal samples in "A B-Boy's Alpha"; the skittering percussion in "Raspberry Fields"; it all works towards making Vast and Vordul's tales of the Big Apple feel more like they're pulled from Day After Tomorrow-era New York than the present-day version.

=== Accolades ===
The Cold Vein was included on several publications' year-end and decade-end lists of best albums. Online music magazine Pitchfork placed The Cold Vein at number 152 on its list of the top 200 albums of the 2000s. Rhapsody ranked the album at number five on its list of the best hip-hop albums of the 2000s. Fact named it the best indie hip-hop record of all time. HipHopDX listed it among the 30 best underground hip-hop albums released since 2000. In 2022, Rolling Stone named it 165th on its list of the 200 greatest rap albums of all time.

== Legacy ==
The Cold Vein only broke through to the mainstream on a small level. However, its legacy has grown significantly over the years and the album is today widely considered as one of the best independent hip-hop albums of the 2000s as well as perhaps the best album released on Definitive Jux.

The song "Iron Galaxy" was featured on the soundtrack to the 2003 video game Tony Hawk's Underground.

After several years of speculation, a follow-up album, Blade of the Ronin, was released on March 3, 2015.

A poster featuring the album art appeared in the 2017 American film Lady Bird.

== Track listing ==
No.	Title	Length
1.	"Iron Galaxy"	5:56
2.	"Ox Out the Cage" (with El-P)	3:28
3.	"Atom" (with Alaska and Cryptic)	5:52
4.	"A B-Boy's Alpha"	4:27
5.	"Raspberry Fields"	4:01
6.	"Straight Off the D.I.C."	4:17
7.	"Vein"	4:27
8.	"The F-Word"	5:27
9.	"Stress Rap"	5:31
10.	"Battle for Asgard" (with L.I.F.E. Long and C-Rayz Walz)	4:26
11.	"Real Earth"	3:57
12.	"Ridiculoid" (with El-P)	4:46
13.	"Painkiller"	5:58
14.	"Pigeon"	6:07
15.	"Scream Phoenix" (unlisted on original CDs and absent from original vinyl pressings.)	5:05
Total length:		73:45

== Personnel ==
Cannibal Ox

- Vast Aire
- Vordul Mega

Additional personnel

- Alaska – performance on "Atom"
- C-Rayz Walz – performance on "Battle for Asgard"
- Cryptic – performance on "Atom"
- DJ Cip One – scratching on "Atom", "Stress Rap" and "Real Earth"
- DJ paWL – scratching on "A B-Boy's Alpha"
- El-P – mixing, production, recording, performance on "Ox Out the Cage" and "Ridiculoid"
- Jay Fluid – scratching on "Iron Galaxy"
- Tyson Jones – illustrations
- Dan Ezra Lang – art direction, design
- Emily Lazar – mastering
- L.I.F.E. Long – performance on "Battle for Asgard"
- Nasa – mixing, recording
- Phil Painson – mixing
- Matt Quinn – mixing
- Vassos – mixing, recording
