= Vordul Mega =

American rapper

Background information
- Also known as: Vordul, Vordul Megallah
- Born: Shamar Gardner; March 24, 1979 (age 47)
- Origin: Harlem, New York City, United States
- Genres: Hip-hop
- Occupation: Rapper
- Years active: 1998–present
- Label: Definitive Jux
- Formerly of: Cannibal Ox; Atoms Family

Shamar Gardner (born March 24, 1979), better known by his stage name Vordul Mega (a.k.a. Vordul Megallah), is an American rapper. He is formerly one half of the underground hip-hop duo Cannibal Ox and a member of the hip-hop group Atoms Family.

Vordul Mega, NYC, 2025

== Career ==
Vordul Mega's debut solo album, The Revolution of Yung Havoks, was released in 2004. That same year, Vordul Mega also put out a supplemental compilation LP composed of new and rare work, some of which was not included on Revolution Of Yung Havoks. This second album, titled Yung World, features guest appearances by Aesop Rock, PR Terrorist (also known as Dom Pachino), Keith Masters and billy woods. It was released exclusively through Sandbox, an online retailer based in New York City. Vordul's counterpart and fellow Cannibal Ox member Vast Aire appears with Vordul on a track titled "Handle That" from Vordul's Revolution Of Yung Havoks. Vast Aire released a solo album called Look Mom... No Hands earlier in 2004.

Vordul has also been involved in numerous side projects with record labels ranging from Think Differently Music to Backwoodz Studioz to Embedded Music. His work with Billy Woods on the 2002 album Camouflage was billed as a collaborative effort, but has since come to be viewed as Billy Woods' solo debut, despite Vordul's presence on one-third of the tracks. Camouflage's limited pressings, quirky production, and socio-political commentary right after the September 11th attacks garnered some accolades.

In 2005, Vordul again collaborated with Backwoodz Studioz as part of a ten-member ensemble of New York based MC's called The Reavers. The Reavers include artists Akir, Vordul Mega, Karniege, Billy Woods, Dom Pachino, Kong, Keith Masters, Goldenchild, Privilege, Hasan Salaam, and Spiga. The group thus incorporates members of several New York City crews and collectives, including Cannibal Ox, Monsta Island Czars, Backwoodz Studioz, Killarmy, and 5th Column. Terror Firma, The Reavers' debut album, was applauded in some circles for its creativity and gritty aesthetic, despite being poorly received by other critics. Shortly afterwards, Definitive Jux announced that it had signed Vast Aire and Vordul Mega to do a second Cannibal Ox album with El-P. Vordul appeared on Keith Masters' Bioluminescence on the tracks "Amongst The Havenots" and "Where Did Life Go Wrong", released in 2005. Vordul also appeared on C-Rayz Walz' Year of the Beast on the track "Street Reppin".

In 2008, Vordul released his second album Megagraphitti. The album was pieced together over the course of 8 years, taking breaks for side projects, and his debut solo album. In 2011, he appeared on the Backwoodz Studios' compilation The Cost of Living on the track "Antz" also featuring Junclassic and billy woods.

== Discography ==
=== Studio albums ===
- The Revolution of Yung Havoks (2004)
- Megagraphitti (2008)

=== Compilation albums ===
- Pure Sickness (2004)
- Yung World (2005)

=== Singles ===
- "Spitamatic" b/w "Neva Again" (2004)
- "Believe" (2005)

=== Guest appearances ===
- Billy Woods - "Minimalism", "Undeclared Wars" and "Dirge" from Camouflage (2003)
- Vast Aire - "Life's Ill Pt. II (The Empire Striketh)" from Look Mom... No Hands (2004)
- Billy Woods - "Mind Control", "Pit & the Pendulum" and "Last MC's" from The Chalice (2004)
- C-Rayz Walz - "Street Reppin" from Year of the Beast (2005)
- Mighty Joseph - "Blood Sport" from Empire State (2008)
- Vast Aire - "Mecca and the Ox" from Dueces Wild (2008)
- Vast Aire - "Thor's Hammer" from OX 2010: A Street Odyssey (2011)
- Billy Woods - "The Darkness" from History Will Absolve Me (2012)
