= Celestial Clockwork =

Studio album by Illogic
- Released: April 13, 2004
- Genre: Hip-hop
- Length: 61:30
- Label: Weightless Recordings
- Producer: Blueprint

Illogic chronology
Got Lyrics? (2001)	Celestial Clockwork (2004)	Diabolical Fun (2009)

Professional ratings
Review scores
Source	Rating
AllMusic	3/5 stars
Exclaim!	favorable
HipHopDX	7.5/10
PopMatters	favorable
Prefix	5.0/10
RapReviews.com	8/10
Stylus Magazine	D+

Celestial Clockwork is the third solo studio album by American rapper Illogic. It was released by Weightless Recordings on April 13, 2004. The production is entirely handled by Blueprint. It features vocal contributions from Aesop Rock, Vast Aire, Slug, and Blueprint.

== Critical reception ==
Dominic Umile of PopMatters gave the album a favorable review, saying, "Celestial Clockwork's mystifying backdrop is an example of Blueprint's ability to hold back as a producer when necessary, but is also an expansive assortment of psychedelic beats that naturally complement Illogic's sly, off-kilter approach."

Alex Henderson of AllMusic gave the album 3 stars out of 5, saying, "Illogic is one of rap's intellectuals, and the heritage that he brings to the table -- influences like De La Soul, Q-Tip, and Common -- makes for a more nuanced, lyrically complex hip-hop experience."

== Track listing ==
No.	Title	Length
1.	"Intro"	0:35
2.	"The Only Constant" (featuring Blueprint)	3:46
3.	"Birthright"	4:45
4.	"1000 Whispers"	5:02
5.	"Time Capsule" (featuring Aesop Rock and Vast Aire)	4:53
6.	"Celestial Clockwork"	3:20
7.	"Hollow Shell (Cash Clutch)"	5:27
8.	"Lesson in Love"	4:01
9.	"First Trimester"	5:54
10.	"Live to Die"	2:37
11.	"Stand" (featuring Slug)	4:16
12.	"My World"	4:03
13.	"I Wish He Would Make Me"	10:21
