= Chocolate Industries =

American record label

- Founder: Marvin "Seven" Bedard
- Genre: Hip hop, electronic
- Country of origin: United States
- Location: Chicago, Illinois

Chocolate Industries was an American record label. Founded in Miami, Florida by Marvin "Seven" Bedard and cofounder Edgar Farinas the label moved to Chicago, Illinois. The label has released studio albums by the likes of Push Button Objects, Diverse, and Vast Aire. In 1999, it was named by Miami New Times as the Best Electronica Label. In 2004, it was described by Billboard as "one of Chicago's most artful, high-profile indie imprints".

In 2002, Chocolate Industries released the Urban Renewal Program compilation album. In 2012, the label released a compilation album, entitled Personal Space: Electronic Soul 1974-1984.

== Roster ==
- Caural
- The Cool Kids
- Diverse
- East Flatbush Project
- Funkstörung
- Ghislain Poirier
- Ko-Wreck Technique
- Lady Sovereign
- Prefuse 73
- Push Button Objects
- Vast Aire
- Via Tania
- While
