= Blueprint (rapper) =

American rapper

- Also known as: Printmatic; Shepard Albertson
- Born: Albert Andrew Shepard; July 11, 1974 (age 52)
- Origin: Columbus, Ohio, U.S.
- Genres: Hip-hop
- Occupations: Rapper; record producer
- Years active: 1997–present
- Labels: Rhymesayers Entertainment; Weightless Recordings
- Website: printmatic.net

Albert Andrew Shepard (born July 11, 1974), better known by his stage name Blueprint, is an American rapper and record producer from Columbus, Ohio. He is a founder of Weightless Recordings.

Blueprint is one half of the duo Soul Position along with producer RJD2. He is also a member of the rap group Greenhouse (formerly known as Greenhouse Effect), which currently consists of himself and Illogic. The duo also run a podcast "Super Duty Tough Work" which airs on YouTube, SoundCloud, and other platforms.

== Life and career ==
Blueprint first gained underground attention as a member of the crew Greenhouse Effect. He then reached a wider audience when he appeared on the track "Final Frontier" from RJD2's debut album Deadringer in 2002. Since then, he has released two albums with RJD2 as Soul Position, as well as several solo albums on Rhymesayers Entertainment, including 1988 (2005) and Adventures in Counter-Culture (2011). In 2014, he released Respect the Architect.

Blueprint has written 4 books as of February 2021. Furthermore, Blueprint does a weekly podcast with fellow Greenhouse member Illogic titled "Super Duty Tough Work" covering topics such as hip-hop, business and art.

== Discography ==
=== Studio albums ===
- The Weightroom (2003)
- Chamber Music (2004)
- 1988 (2005)
- Iron and Niacin (2006)
- Sign Language (2009)
- Adventures in Counter-Culture (2011)
- Deleted Scenes (2012)
- Respect the Architect (2014)
- King No Crown (2015)
- Two Headed Monster (2018)

=== Compilation albums ===
- Weightless Radio: A Collection of Blueprint Instrumentals (2011)

=== EPs ===
- Vitamins & Minerals (2004)
- Blueprint vs. Funkadelic (2008)
- Blueprint Who (2010)
- Vigilante Genesis (2016)
- Falling Down (2024)

=== Singles ===
- "Boombox" (2005)
- "So Alive" (2011)

=== Guest appearances ===
- Illogic - "Favorite Things" and "Blueprint" from Unforeseen Shadows (2000)
- Sage Francis - "Orphanage Freestyle" from Sick of Waiting Tables (2001)
- Eyedea & Abilities - "Before and After" from First Born (2001)
- Illogic - "Break Bread" from Got Lyrics? (2002)
- Aesop Rock - "Alchemy" from Daylight (2002)
- RJD2 - "Final Frontier" from Deadringer (2002)
- Mars Ill - "Planes and Trains" from Backbreakanomics (2003)
- Static & Nat Ill - "Fist High" from Teamwork (2004)
- Tack Fu - "Evolution Is Outdated" from 85 Decibel Monks (2004)
- Vast Aire - "Zenith" from Look Mom... No Hands (2004)
- Illogic - "The Only Constant" from Celestial Clockwork (2004)
- Envelope - "Be Your Own Man" from Insignificant Anthems (2005)
- Mr. Lif - "Mo' Mega" from Mo' Mega (2006)
- Zero Star - "Catch Up" from Forever's Never Really That Long (2006)
- Lord 360 - "Previously Pillaged" from The Anomaly LP (The Battle Cry) (2006)
- Ill Poetic - "Common Knowledge" from The World Is Ours (2007)
- Atmosphere - "Crewed Up" from Strictly Leakage (2008)
- Envelope - "Looking In" from Shark Bolt (2008)
- Bottom Brick - "Cadillac Rap" from The Groundbreaking (2008)
- Jake One - "Scared" from White Van Music (2008)
- BK-One with Benzilla - "Blue Balls" from Rádio Do Canibal (2009)
- Felt - "Protagonists (Full Clip Remix)" (2009)
- Small Professor - "Make Moves" from Gigantic Vol. 1 (2012)
- Aesop Rock - "BMX" from Skelethon (2012)
- Abstract Rude & Musab - "Pomp and Circumstance" from The Awful Truth (2012)
- True Believers - "One Question" from The Man (2012)
- Illus - "The Gift" and "Extraordinary" from Family First (2012)
- Solillaquists of Sound - "Here I Am" from The 4th Wall: Part 2 (2013)
- Art Vandelay - "When Death Sings" from Eye 8 the Crow (2013)
- Midaz the Beast - "Seeing Is Believing" from AU: Another Universe (2013)
- RJD2 - "It All Came to Me in a Dream" from More Is Than Isn't (2013)
- Mad Dukez & Fresh Kils - "Rearview Reminder" from Gettin' Gatsby (2013)
- Illogic & Blockhead - "Justified" from Capture the Sun (2013)
- Rick Chyme - "Starving Artists" from 5iveit LP (2013)
- J. Rawls - "Best Producer on the Mic II" from The Legacy (2014)
- Doze - "How America Works" from Hell Is Hot as Hell, Boss (2014)
- Illus & ICBM - "Beautiful Thing" from Behind the Mask (2014)
- Ill State - "Blood, Sweat & Tears" from Illiterates (2014)
- Illus & DJ Johnny Juice - "Extraordinary" and "Beautiful Thing" from Kaboom (2015)
- Abstract Rude - "Kan of Whoop Ass Reprise" from Keep the Feel: A Legacy of Hip Hop Soul (2015)
- Doze - "No Gravity" from Pay Dues Forever (2015)
- Paulie Rhyme - "Dream Chasers" from Super String Theory (2015)
- Atmosphere - "This Lonely Rose" from Frida Kahlo Vs Ezra Pound (2015)
- RJD2 - "Up in the Clouds" from Dame Fortune (2016)
- More Or Les - "No Turning Back" (also featuring The Mighty Rhino) from Blow The Fuck Up But Stay Humble (2016)
- The MC Type – "Folding Chair" from Lucky Silverback (2024)
- COOLETHAN – "Pickup Lines" from You Can Never Go Back (2024)

=== Productions ===
- Aesop Rock - "Alchemy" from Daylight (2002)
- Illogic - Celestial Clockwork (2004)
- Vast Aire - "Zenith" and "Outro: 12 Noon" from Look Mom... No Hands (2004)
