= Vast Aire =

American rapper

- Born: Theodore Arrington II; February 5, 1978 (age 48); Mount Vernon, New York, U.S.
- Origin: Manhattan, New York City, U.S.
- Genres: Hip-hop
- Occupations: Rapper; producer
- Years active: 2000–present
- Labels: Chocolate Industries; Definitive Jux; Eastern Conference; Scienceninjateam; Fat Beats; Gracie Productions; Man Bites Dog; One; Tenement
- Member of: Cannibal Ox
- Formerly of: Atoms Family Scienceninjateam; The Weathermen

Theodore Arrington II (born February 5, 1978), better known by his stage name Vast Aire, is an American rapper. He is one half of the New York hip-hop duo Cannibal Ox, which consists of him and fellow rapper Vordul Mega. He is also a member of the rap group Atoms Family and Scienceninjateam. He was born in Mount Vernon, New York, then lived in Jamaica, Queens, Vast also spent time in Poughkeepsie, NY having graduated from Poughkeepsie High School, before moving to Harlem, and became acquainted with the underground rap scene, performing in many clubs while still a teenager. He was once a part of the underground hip-hop group The Weathermen and then recorded with Al Babblez and Scienceninjateam records.

== Career ==
Vast Aire's fame increased significantly as part of Cannibal Ox with Vordul Mega. Their debut album, The Cold Vein, recorded with producer El-P, was released in 2001 to critical acclaim. Since then, Vast Aire has pursued solo interests. His first solo album Look Mom... No Hands was released in April 2004. This was followed by The Best Damn Rap Show, a collaborative effort with DJ Mighty Mi from The High & Mighty in 2005. These solo projects did not break Vast Aire from his obligations at Definitive Jux with Cannibal Ox. Vast has since gone on to work with members from the Megahertz crew, and was a member of The Weathermen and Scienceninjateam alongside Copywrite, Yak Ballz, Cage, Aesop Rock, the late Camu Tao, and Tame One.

In 2025, Vast Aire toured Europe with Cannibal Ox on the Aireplane Europe Tour; during the tour, a music video for the song “Good Fuel” was filmed in London.

== Name ==
When asked about the meaning of his name, Vast Aire explained: "I guess it means mad styles. I think it means a lot of attitude. Vast Aire. I have a very wordy type of style. Vast was given to me by a friend of mine I went to school with and the Aire pretty much came from me being a junior. My name is Theodore Arrington II. I used to spell it proper. H-E-I-R. But, in the past couple of years, I switched it to A-I-R-E."

== Discography ==
=== Studio albums ===
- Look Mom... No Hands (2004)
- The Best Damn Rap Show (2005) (with DJ Mighty Mi)
- Empire State (2007) (with Karniege, as Mighty Joseph)
- Dueces Wild (2008)
- OX 2010: A Street Odyssey (2011)

=== Compilation albums ===
- Best of the Best Vol. 1 (2013)

=== EPs ===
- A Space Iliad (2013)
- The Heir Vast (2016) (with Raticus)

777 vol. 1 Vast Aire X Pruven (2018) 777 vol. 2 Vast Aire x Pruven (2018) 777 vol. 3 Vast Aire x Pruven (2019)

=== Singles ===
- "Look Mom...No Hands" b/w "Why'sdaskyblue?" (2003)
- "Elixir" b/w "Candid Cam" (2004)
- "Pegasus" b/w "Red Pill" (2004)
- "In the Zone" (2016)
- "Frankfurter" (2018)

=== Guest appearances ===
- Aesop Rock - "Attention Span" from Float (2000)
- Ace Lover - "Lucky 7" from Area Code 12" (2000)
- Techno Animal - "We Can Build You" from The Brotherhood of the Bomb (2001)
- Atoms Family - "Sinister"; "Time to Unravel" and "His Majesty's Laughter" from Euphony (2001)
- Greenhouse Effect - "Friction" from Life Sentences (2001)
- Aesop Rock - "Nickel Plated Pockets" from Daylight (2002)
- El-P - "Dr. Hell No and the Praying Mantis" from Def Jux II / Fantastic Damage (2002)
- Oddjobs - "Dry Bones Remix" from Dry Bones 12" (2002)
- The Presence - "Razor Fund" from Woke 12" (2002)
- Masai Bey - "The Beginning" from Paper Maiche 12" (2002)
- RJD2 - "Final Frontier" [Remix] from The Horror (2003)
- Diverse - "Big Game" from One A.M. (2003)
- C-Rayz Walz - "The Lineup" from Ravipops (The Substance) (2003)
- High & Mighty - "Take It Off" + "High Heat" from The Highlight Zone (2003)
- Push Button Objects - "Fly" from Ghetto Blaster (2003)
- Aesop Rock - "N.Y. Electric" from Bazooka Tooth (2003)
- Jean Grae - "Swing Blades" from The Bootleg of the Bootleg EP (2003)
- S.A. Smash - "Slide on 'Em (Escapade)" from Smashy Trashy (2003)
- Illogic - "Time Capsule" from Celestial Clockwork (2004)
- Blueprint - "Small World, Big Plans" from Chamber Music (2004)
- Vordul Mega - "Handle That" from The Revolution of Yung Havoks (2004)
- Billy Woods - "Drinks" from The Chalice (2004)
- Zion I - "Dumb Down" from Family Business (2004)
- Mr. Complex - "Calm Down" from Twisted Mister (2004)
- DutchMassive - "It Gets Worse" from Junk Planet (2004)
- Timbo King, Prodigal Sunn - "Slow Blues" from Wu-Tang Meets the Indie Culture (2005)
- Dabrye - "That's Whats Up" from Two/Three (2006)
- Oh No - "No Aire" from Exodus into Unheard Rhythms (2006)
- Wisemen - "Iconoclasts" from Wisemen Approaching (2006)
- Zimbabwe Legit - "Wake 'EM Up" from House of Stone (2007)
- Toteking - "Jugar Duro" from Un Tipo Cualquiera (2007)
- Principles of Geometry - "Napoleon" from Lazare (2007)
- Vordul Mega - "AK-47" + "In the Mirror" from Megagraphitti (2008)
- Double A.B. - "The Diesel" from The Diesel (2008)
- Mind over Matter - "Clipped Wings" from Keepin' It Breezy (2008)
- Sadistik - "Writes of Passage" from The Balancing Act (2008)
- DJ Bootsie - "Vast Hope" from Holidays in the Shade (2008)
- Atari Blitzkrieg - "The Cry from Within" from 12.31.99 (2009)
- Notes To Self - “Lifeline” [Remix] from Warning Shots EP (2009)
- Elevated Ruffians - "Nothing Can Stop Me" from The Magnificent Soul LP
- Stress 1 - "Bring It Back" from Eyerockmics Vol. 1 (2010)
- Virtuoso - "Bay of Pigs" from The Final Conflict (2011)
- Lewis Parker - "Murder One" from Dangerous Adventures (2011)
- Chasm - "Intergalactic" from This Is How We Never Die (2012)
- True Believers - "Five Point Star" (2014)
- Auxiliary Phoenix - "Night Light" from Power Cosmic (2017)

=== Compilation pop-ups ===
- "Adversity Strikes (One+One)" & "Not for Promotional Use" from The Persecution of Hip Hop (1998)
- "Resolution" & "Mommi's Relay Race" from Old Trolls New Bridge (1999)
- "Cholesterol"; "Atom All Stars"; "Rhyming for Dummies" from The Prequel (Atoms Family) (2000)
- "Tippin Domino's", "Tap Dancin for Scratch", & "Tippin Domino's (RJD2 Remix)" from The Bedford Files (2002)
- "The Beam Up" from Eastern Conference All Stars IV (2004)
- "Super Friends (Edan Remix)" from Chocolate Swim (2006)
- "Blood of Bantu" from "Midlife Crisis" Obi Khan (2018)
