= C-Rayz Walz =

American rapper (born 1975)

- Born: Waleed Shabazz; August 3, 1975 (age 51); The Bronx, New York City, New York, U.S.
- Genre: Hip-hop
- Occupation: Rapper
- Instrument: Vocals
- Years active: 1999–present
- Labels: Definitive Jux; Sun Cycle; Draft; Babygrande; Kings Link; Modular Mood Music; Worker B; Detonator

Waleed Shabazz (born August 3, 1975), better known by his stage name C-Rayz Walz, is an American rapper from the Bronx, New York. He has been a member of the collective Stronghold.

== Early life ==
Waleed Shabazz was born and raised in the Bronx, New York. His father was a drug kingpin. When he was 2 years old, his father was murdered.

He grew up listening to DJ Kool Herc, who is credited with originating hip-hop music. In this environment, he developed a love of music and began freestyling with his friends for fun. In school, he had rap battles in the lunch room with his childhood friend Prodigy.

== Career ==
In 2003, C-Rayz Walz released a studio album, Ravipops (The Substance), on Definitive Jux. In 2005, he released another studio album, Year of the Beast, on the label. In 2007, he released a collaborative studio album with Sharkey, titled Monster Maker, on Babygrande Records.

== Personal life ==
Waleed Shabazz is currently incarcerated, having accepted a plea bargain for assault and kidnapping on January 30, 2023. These charges were pled down from rape, sodomy, child endangerment, among the original 30+ charges. Shabazz will serve a 10 year sentence and is not permitted to contact his victim nor their shared son for a minimum of 15 years.

== Discography ==
=== Studio albums ===
- The Prelude (1999)
- Detonator Records Volume 1 (2001) (with Akrobatik, Breez Evahflowin, and Chan)
- Off the Radar (2003)
- Limelight (The Outroduction) (2003)
- Ravipops (The Substance) (2003)
- Year of the Beast (2005)
- 1975: Return of the Beast (2006)
- The Best of the Beast (2006)
- The Dropping (2006)
- Monster Maker (2007) (with Sharkey)
- Chorus Rhyme (2007) (with Parallel Thought)
- Freestyle vs. Written (2008) (with Kosha Dillz)
- Almighty: Original S.I.N. (2008) (with Killah Priest, M-Eighty, Son One, Bronze Nazareth, and 5-Star, as Almighty)
- Who the F%@k Are You? (2009)
- Naptown: The Broken Comb (2010)
- All Blvck Everything: The Prelude (2011)
- Year of the Beatnikz (2011)
- The Code (2012)
- The Calendar (2012)
- St. Patrick Rayz: The Leper-Con (2013)
- Almighty: The Solar Facts (2013)
- Feel Me (2014) (with Sallam Said)

=== Compilation albums ===
- Singular Plurals (2002)
- Singular Plurals Vol. 2 (2005)
- Free Rayz Walz (2008)
- Beat the System (2010)
- Where the Walz Things Are (2010)
- I Am Numba Four (2011)

=== EPs ===
- We Live: The Black Samurai (2004)

=== Singles ===
- "Pots and Pans" (2001)
- "It's a Wrap" / "Peroxide" (2002)
- "The Essence" (2003)
- "Buck 80" / "Body You" (2003)
- "We Live" / "Protect My Family" (2004)
- "R'Thentic" / "Street Reppin'" (2005)
- "Dead Flowers" (2009)
- "Linsanity" (2012)

=== Guest appearances ===
- Aesop Rock - "Bent Life" from Labor Days (2001)
- Cannibal Ox - "Battle for Asgard" from The Cold Vein (2001)
- El-P - "Blood" from Fantastic Damage (2002)
- Dutchmassive - "The Hook" from Junk Planet (2004)
- Chase Phoenix - "Say Something" from Cut to the Chase (2004)
- Dub Sonata - "New York" from On the Arm (2007)
- Gumz - "Hip Hop Music" from From Fetus to Genius (2007)
- Socalled - "You Are Never Alone" from Ghettoblaster (2007)
- LoDeck & Omega One - "Nice Kids" from "Postcards from the Third Rock" (2008)
- DJ I-Dee - "Explosion" from Solitude (2008)
- Sadat X - "Gamer" from Brand New Bein' (2009)
- Time - "Paraghnoid" from Naked Dinner (2009)
- MC Paul Barman - "The Moon" from Thought Balloon Mushroom Cloud (2009)
- Access Immortal - "I Love New York" from Birth of a Dream (2010)
- DJ Lord Ron - "Concrete Bars (Echo Park Beat Street N2 Da Future)" and "It'z Da R.C.P." from Environmental Shape Sounds of DJ Lord Ron (2010)
- Irealz - "Starz of the Godz" from The Code of Omerta (2011)
- Verse Essential - "Between the Lines" from Ingenious: Deluxe Edition (2011)
- Intention - "Blvck Pioneer" from American Psycho (2012)
- Bedlam Brethren - "Apocalypto" from Black Feather Messengers (2012)
- Falcon Burns & Melph - "The Cypher" from Back in Effect: The Word Effect Chapter II (2012)
- Apaulo Treed & Knightstalker - "Contraband" from The Last Line of Defence (2013)
- Junclassic - "My Style (Remix)" from Blvd Backdrop (2013)
- Cannibal Ox - "Street Reppin" and "That Moment Before Crazy" from Gotham (2013)
- Plot - "I Feel Dirty" from Towny Fresh (2014)
- Scholars Ent. - "When It Was Real" from Maintenance Vol. 1 (2015)
- Obi Khan - "The Circus" from Grhyme... Thee EP (2018)
- Kyo Itachi & Realio Sparkzwell - "Enemy of the State" from Akira (2018)
