= Illogic =

American rapper

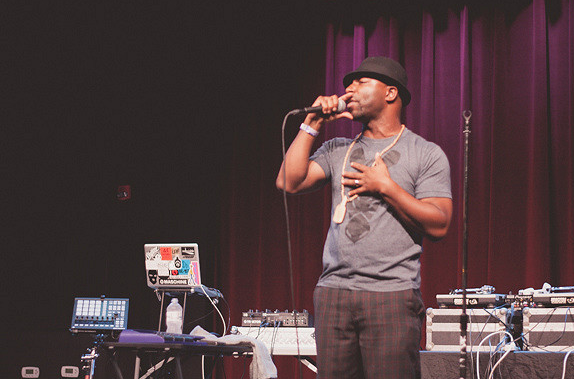
- Illogic performing live in 2010

Background information
- Born: Jawhar Glass; January 18, 1980 (age 46)
- Origin: Columbus, Ohio
- Genres: Hip-hop, alternative hip-hop
- Occupation: Rapper
- Years active: 1998–present
- Label: Weightless Recordings
- Website: iamillogic.com

Jawhar Glass (born January 18, 1980), better known by his stage name Illogic, is an American indie hip-hop artist from Columbus, Ohio. He has collaborated with many artists—particularly Blueprint, who has produced three of his albums, but also Aesop Rock, Vast Aire, Eyedea, Copywrite, Slug, and other MCs. His style has been described as having "a classically metered flow" with "deep lyrics and poetic verses."

== History ==
Illogic began his career in freestyle battles and became the Columbus champion in 1997. He released his first four albums with Weightless Recordings which established himself as a forerunner of the indie rap boom. Illogic then moved to the Dove Ink label which he ran with his friend Eyamme until his return to Weightless Recordings in 2009 for Diabolical Fun accompanied by Ill Poetic.

In 2012, he released an EP titled Preparing for Capture, which was entirely produced by Blockhead in preparation for their upcoming full-length album, Capture the Sun. Speaking on the collaboration, Illogic said, "We have worked hard to really try to find our own identity as a duo and not to try recreate what I've done with other producers and what he has done with other artists." After the success of Preparing for Capture, they proceeded to release a sequel to the EP, Preparing for Capture 2.

== Discography ==
=== Albums ===
- Unforeseen Shadows (2000)
- Got Lyrics? (2001)
- Celestial Clockwork (2004)
- Diabolical Fun (2009)
- Capture the Sun (2013) (with Blockhead)
- Bend But Don't Break (2013) (with Blueprint, as Greenhouse)
- Blank Eyes (2016)
- A Man Who Thinks With His Own Mind (2016) (with Ill2lectual)
- Lucid Logic (2017) (with Lucid Optics)
- Autopilot (2020)
- The Transition (2022)

=== Extended plays ===
- Write to Death Volume 1: My Hand Hurts (2003)
- Write to Death Volume 2: The Missing Pieces (2006)
- One Bar Left (2008)
- Preparing for Capture 1 (2012) (with Blockhead)
- Preparing for Capture 2 (2012) (with Blockhead)
- After Capture (2013) (with Blockhead)
- Something in the Water (2014) (with Ill2lectual)

=== Guest appearances ===
- Doseone - "Blur" from Hemispheres (1998)
- Clouddead - "Apt. A" from Clouddead (2000)
- Aesop Rock - "One Brick" from Labor Days (2001)
- Blueprint - "Who Do You Love?" from Adventures in Counter-Culture (2011)
- Copywrite - "Sorrow" from God Save the King (2012)
