= Cannibal Ox =

American hip-hop group

- Also known as: Can Ox
- Origin: Harlem, New York, United States
- Genres: Hip-hop, alternative hip-hop
- Years active: 1998–present
- Labels: Definitive Jux, IGC Records/iHipHop Distribution
- Members: Vast Aire
- Past members: Vordul Mega
- Website: cannibalox.com

Cannibal Ox is an American hip-hop project from Harlem, New York, United States. It consisted of Vast Aire and Vordul Mega, often accompanied by DJ Cip-One. Vordul Mega left the project in 2023.

== History ==
The members of Cannibal Ox, Vast Aire, and Vordul Mega met each other as high school students in Harlem. They began performing in the New York underground hip-hop scene in the 1990s, leading them to meet El-P and become among the first members of his record label Definitive Jux.

In 2001, Cannibal Ox released their debut studio album, The Cold Vein. It was the first full-length studio album released by Definitive Jux and was fully produced by El-P. The Cold Vein received positive reviews from critics and put the duo in the underground hip-hop spotlight, and it has been highlighted as one of underground hip-hop's best albums by outlets such as Fact and HipHopDX. However, the duo did not release any further projects until the 2005 live album Return of the Ox: Live at CMJ. That live album, a recording of their September 17, 2005 Rothko concert which was the midnight closing show of the 2005 CMJ Music Festival, was promoted as being the start of the group's return, and also contained a new song called "Live from the Planet of Eat", squashing two years of break-up rumors. The liner notes of Return of the Ox hinted that a Cannibal Ox LP would be released in 2006, though the duo ultimately released no music that year. The final El-P produced Cannibal Ox track was Mr. Lif's "Brothaz" remix, released on the 'Definitive Swim' compilation on February 27, 2007.

In March 2007, El-P stated that he "really doubt[ed]" that a second Cannibal Ox album would be released in the near future. Later that year, Vast Aire confirmed that he was no longer working with Definitive Jux, and that plans for a new Cannibal Ox LP had been scrapped. He cited creative and financial differences with El-P and Definitive Jux, as well as Vordul's alleged clinical depression. Though the group's members did not collaborate under the Cannibal Ox name in the late 2000s, Vast Aire made a guest appearance on Vordul's 2008 album Megagraphitti, and Vordul appeared on Vast Aire's albums Dueces Wild (2008) and OX 2010: A Street Odyssey (2010). In May 2011, El-P stated on his Facebook page that "there wont ever be a can[nibal] ox album produced by me again and thats a fact."

On April 16, 2013, Cannibal Ox released a single titled "Gotham", produced by Bill Cosmiq. The duo's next project was Blade of the Ronin, their second studio album, which was released through iHipHop Distribution on March 3, 2015. Blade of the Ronin was produced by Bill Cosmiq and Black Milk.

== Discography ==
Studio albums

- The Cold Vein (2001)
- Blade of the Ronin (2015)
- Live from the Aireport (2023)
- Aireplane (2025)

Compilations

- Gotham (Deluxe LP Edition) (2013)

Live albums

- Return of the Ox: Live at CMJ (2005)

Singles

- "Iron Galaxy / DPA (As Seen on T.V.)" (2000) (with Company Flow)
- "Vein / A B-Boy's Alpha" (2001)
- "The F Word" (2001)
- "Cosmos / Streets Be Testin' You" (2003) (with Invisible)
- "Gotham" (2013)
- "Metal Ox" (2021)
- "Raspberry Jelly" (2021) (with Double A.B.)
- "Da Supafriendz" (2022) (with MF Doom)
