= Zammuto (band) =

American indie rock band

- Origin: Readsboro, Vermont, United States
- Genres: Indie rock, electronic music
- Years active: 2011–present
- Label: Temporary Residence Limited
- Formerly of: The Books
- Members: Nick Zammuto; Sean Dixon; Nicholas Oddy; Mikey Zammuto
- Past members: Gene Back
- Website: zammutosound.com

Zammuto is the name of both a solo musical project of Nick Zammuto started in 1998, and later of an indie rock band that formed in Readsboro, Vermont, United States, in 2011.

Nick Zammuto self-released the three disc album Solutiore Of Stareau on CD-R in 1998, and the albums Willscher in 2000 on the label Apartment B, and Solutiore Of Stareau: Disc One in 2001 on the label Infraction. Nick Zammuto then joined with Paul de Jong to form the group The Books, producing several albums. After the duo The Books ended their collaboration in 2011, Nick Zammuto formed a band. In April 2012, the band Zammuto released their debut album, Zammuto, with the Brooklyn, New York-based record label, Temporary Residence Limited.

The band Zammuto has toured as a support act for Explosions in the Sky and Gotye, as well as headlining tours in the United States, Canada, and Europe with the bands AU, Snowblink, and Lymbyc Systym, among other acts.

== History ==
=== Solo works ===
Nick Zammuto self-published Solutiore Of Stareau as a three CD-R album in 1998. The third CD was later reissued in 2000 as the album Willscher on the label Apartment B Records, with positive reviews. The first CD was reissued in 2001 as the album Solutiore of Stareau: Disc One on the label Infraction Records.

=== The Books ===
Nick Zammuto had been making critically acclaimed music starting in the year 2001 as a member of the band The Books. From 2001 through 2010, The Books released four studio albums.

The albums are Thought for Food (2002), The Lemon of Pink (2003), Lost and Safe (2005), and The Way Out (2010). The first three albums were released under the Tomlab label, and the fourth album was released under Temporary Residence LTD. The Books also released 2 DVDs of videos, and an EP called Music for a French Elevator and Other Short Format Oddities by the Books during this time.

Upon the dissolution of his first band, Nick Zammuto stated in an interview on Pitchfork that "it was a scramble for me to figure out what to do next. I seriously considered just stopping music since it's such an uncertain business and hard on my family, but my wife and close friends urged me to make another record right away. It definitely had a 'do or die' kind of feeling hanging over it."

=== Idiom Wind EP ===
While working on their first album in the year 2011, Zammuto released a three-song EP composed of songs which were to appear on their forthcoming album. This record was called the Idiom Wind EP and was released by a London-based record label called Make Mine Records. It contained the songs "Idiom Wind", "F U C-3PO", and "Weird Ceiling". "F U C-3PO" was named as "best new track" by Pitchfork Media.

=== First album ===
On April 3, 2012, Zammuto released their self-titled first full-length album, under Temporary Residence LTD. The album received a wide variety of critical response, scoring an overall rating of 76 on Metacritic and a rating of 8.0 on Pitchfork Media.

=== Live show and touring ===
Immediately following the release of their first album, Zammuto toured extensively during 2012, playing more than 80 shows throughout the United States, Canada, and Europe. They began touring as an opening act for their label-mate, Explosions in the Sky. In the fall of 2012, they began a nationwide headlining tour through North America, mixed in with a few opening acts for the Australian band Gotye. They ended their intense touring in the spring of 2013 with a small North American tour with the Canadian band Snowblink.

Nick Zammuto did an interview explaining the process of preparing for their live shows. "My studio is a tractor garage that, from the outside, is just a shack but you go inside and it's state-of-the-art equipment and I love that tension. It's really funny and it's great because I have my band out from New York City and they view it as a haven. We just work with total focus and get a lot done and then we can all go back to our normal lives afterwards. It's always a beautiful moment to have them up."

=== Second album ===
In the summer of 2013, Zammuto announced they were working on a second album. In order to generate funds for the completion of their second album, the band participated in a crowd funding effort on Indiegogo, which received overwhelming support by the fans, collecting 350% of their original goal. During the fundraiser, the band released three new songs, "Sinker", "Need Some Sun", and "Corduroys" The album, Anchor, was released on September 2, 2014, under the label Temporary Residence Limited.

== Band members ==
Current

- Nick Zammuto - vocals, electric guitar, Moog synth, laptop (2011–present)
- Sean Dixon - drums, drum pad (2011–present)
- Mikey Zammuto - bass (2011–present)
- Nick Oddy - electric guitar, keyboards (2013–present)

Former

- Gene Back - electric guitar, keyboards (2011–2013)

== Discography ==
Solo works

- Solutiore Of Stareau (3 × CD-R) - 1998, self-released
- Willscher - 2000, Apartment B
- Solutiore Of Stareau: Disc One - 2001, Infraction Records

Albums

- Zammuto - 2012, Temporary Residence Limited
- Anchor - 2014, Temporary Residence Limited

EPs

- Idiom Wind - 2011, Make Mine Records
- Veryone - 2016, Temporary Residence Limited

Soundtracks

- We The Animals: An Original Motion Picture Soundtrack - 2018, Soundtrack for the 2018 film We the Animals

=== Films ===
A short documentary about the band entitled The Shape of Things to Come was directed and released by Wondermind Pictures, spotlighting the band. This documentary received wide critical acclaim, appearing in numerous film festivals around the United States.

== Tours ==
2012

- Three-show tour including MASS MoCA, New York City, and Boston shows
- United States supporting tour with Explosions in the Sky
- United States and Canada supporting tour with Gotye
- United States headlining tour with Lymbyc Systym
- West Coast headlining tour with AU
- European headlining tour

Festival appearances

- Hopscotch Music Festival
- Mission Creek Festival
- Le Guess Who Festival
- Autumn Falls Festival
- Transmusicales Festival

2013

- United States and Canada headlining tour with Snowblink
