= Vocal Studies + Uprock Narratives =

Studio album by Prefuse 73
- Released: June 11, 2001
- Genres: IDM, glitch, hip-hop
- Length: 50:42
- Label: Warp

Prefuse 73 chronology
Estrocaro (2000)	Vocal Studies + Uprock Narratives (2001)	The '92 vs. '02 Collection (2002)

Vocal Studies + Uprock Narratives is a 2001 studio album by Guillermo Scott Herren, the first released under the name Prefuse 73. The album was released on June 11, 2001, on Warp. The music was created by Herren alone, with some tracks featuring guest vocals from MCs Mikah 9, MF Doom and Aesop Rock as well as vocalist Sam Prekop from The Sea and Cake. Inspired by Miami bass and early 90s hip-hop, Herren had been recording music with his Music Production Center (MPC) for Schematic Records, a label known primarily for intelligent dance music (IDM). After working with various local hip-hop artists making what he described as "very boring rap beats", Herren was inspired to take his music in a more left-field direction.

Vocal Studies + Uprock Narratives's music is primarily instrumental and features unintelligible cut-up vocals. Originally inspired to sample the hip-hop artists he was signed to work with in the studio, the album consists of samples by more popular hip-hop artists including Nas, Ol' Dirty Bastard and Erykah Badu. Despite being described as electronic music, IDM and glitch and not the kind of music a hip-hop audience is used to hearing, Herren felt that his music was closer to hip-hop.

The album's release after a tour that included a performance at All Tomorrow's Parties in the United Kingdom as well as opening for the group Tortoise in the United States. The album did not chart in either the United Kingdom or United States, but received positive reviews from various sources including AllMusic, Spin and Uncut. It was later named as one of the best albums of the year by Rolling Stone and The Globe and Mail and one of the best albums of the first half the 2000s by Pitchfork.

== Background and production ==
In the mid- to late 1990s, Guillermo Scott Herren returned to Decatur, Georgia, from New York and worked at a recording studio. Unsatisfied working with the studio's clients, who he felt made "pre-historic trap music", Herren was encouraged to take his music in a more left-field direction, as he was "bored with people barking orders at me to make them these really boring rap beats." In return for Herren handling the studio's hip-hop clients, the studio owner bought him a Music Production Center (MPC) which Herren would use to create his Prefuse 73 material.

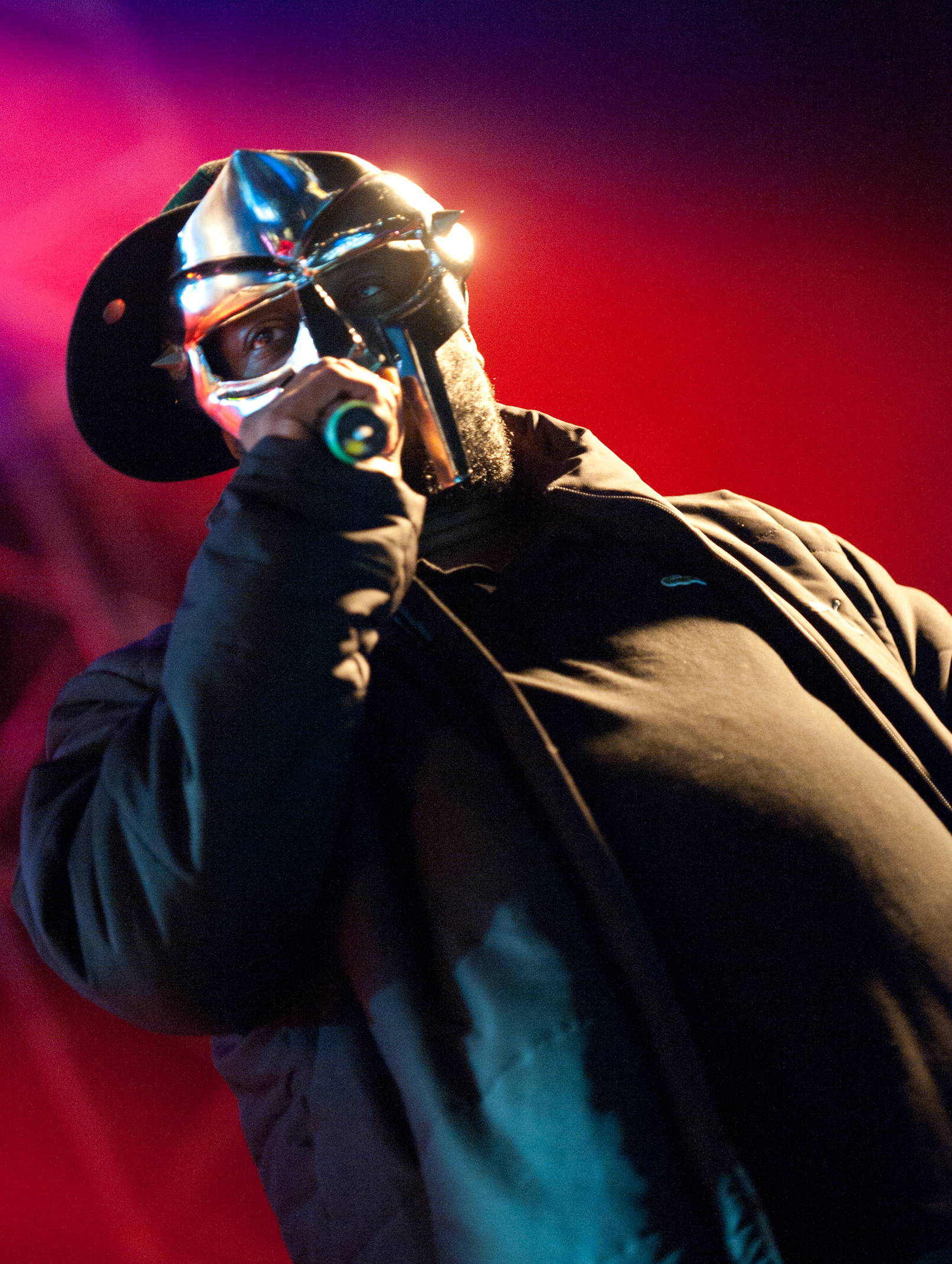
Hip hop artist MF Doom (pictured) is featured on the album.

While working at the studio, Herren met Joshua Kay and Romulo del Castillo, two Miami-based producers who had founded Schematic Records, a label known for IDM. Herren recorded and composed music on his MPC and manipulated it to fit Schematic's aesthetic. While working at the recording studio, Herren felt that the hip-hop musicians coming in had very trite lyrics, and felt he could use them for his own Prefuse 73 material. For Vocal Studies + Uprock Narratives, Herren sampled more famous hip-hop records by artists including Nas, Ol' Dirty Bastard and Erykah Badu. Herren stated that he used some of his favorite MCs instead of the musicians he worked with, as he felt these artists were "saying totally relevant stuff, but I guess it was just my excitement to make it happen. But a vocal doesn't have to say anything. Why not challenge people's imagination and let it say whatever they want it to?" For Vocal Studies + Uprock Narratives, Herren created the music using two turntables plugged into his MPC. To create the glitch sounds through the MPC, Herren switched between different sample sources by instantaneously silencing groups of audio channels at the same time.

In 1999, Herren signed to the British label Warp under two aliases, Prefuse 73 and Savath & Savalas, after Warp staff had heard a previous record of Herren's which had sparked their interest in his work. Herren was familiar with the label through artists Aphex Twin and Boards of Canada, but chose to sign to Warp as he was a fan of the group Broadcast who had released an EP through the label. Vocal Studies + Uprock Narratives features rapping from Mikah 9, Aesop Rock and MF Doom, and vocals from Sam Prekop of the indie rock band the Sea and Cake. The vocalists did not work directly with Herren, but sent him audio tapes of their own vocal recordings. Herren later commented on having Prekop sing on the album, noting that having an indie rock artist on the album was his way of trying to get his sound out to a new audience.

== Music ==
Herren described the album as an attempt to bridge hip hop instrumentals with vocal-orientated hip-hop tracks, saying that the chopped and edited raps were "another layer of music" and that he was "into creating a whole new mangled language [...] it's a form of communication without communicating, a new flow when you feel like you're listening to a standard hip hop track but there's something in it that's not right." The cut-up vocals were also described by Herren as a tribute to Miami bass music and the group Mantronix. Herren said: "Old school dirty south and booty shake shit, just the way stuff was edited back then, all the bass music and edit records... that's what inspired me. I wanted to make edit records, but bring all the shit that happened afterwards into it, hip hop from the early 90s through the present day." The song "Nuno" features chopped-up vocals with only the phrase "fuck words of wisdom" intelligible; the title is a reference to the Portuguese musician Nuno Canavarro, whose 1988 album Plux Quba also features manipulated vocals including randomly-reassembled tapes of children singing. Herren used a sample from Canavarro's song "Wask" for "Nuno".

The Sydney Morning Herald stated that "journalists obsessed with labels" had described the music in a range of genres "from 'glitch' to 'click-hop'." Music journalists made other comparisons of the music in context of both electronic and hip-hop, with Exclaim! describing this sound as "not exactly what the hip hop world is used to hearing." Fact expanded on the description of the two genres, stating that "the sonic cut-ups that characterize Vocal Studies have often been linked to the IDM scene, but they can just as well be understood within the context of scratching and turntablism, where snatching small elements of records and re-contextualizing them was key." Herren has only described his style as hip-hop, saying that he does not listen to electronic music and that "some people have a hard time accepting what I do."

During promotion of his next album One Word Extinguisher, Herren stated that Vocal Studies + Uprock Narratives did not have a particular theme as he was primarily focusing on and developing an editing style. In contrast, his follow-up One Word Extinguisher was about his relationship with a woman and the vast spectrum of emotions felt during a break-up.

== Release and promotion ==
Prior to the release of Vocal Studies + Uprock Narratives, Herren performed at the All Tomorrow's Parties festival at Camber Sands in April 2001. The festival was curated by the band Tortoise, with whom Herren toured as the opening act in May 2001. Vocal Studies + Uprock Narratives was released on June 11, 2001, through Warp on vinyl, compact disc and download. It was Warp's second release by an American musician, following Richard Devine's Lipswitch which had been released in the previous January. The album did not chart in the United States or United Kingdom. Herren was not happy on how the album was promoted, saying: "I couldn't understand why they were treating me like I was 10. They were ignoring all the cultural references that were to be found throughout that first record." He felt the album "would have been easier to package if I'd been from the Bronx. Instead I was from Miami, and lived in Decatur."

== Critical reception ==
Professional ratings
Review scores
Source	Rating
AllMusic	4.5/5 stars
Muzik	4/5
NME	7/10
Pitchfork	8.7/10
Spin	8/10
Stylus Magazine	B

John Bush of AllMusic described the album as "one of the most enjoyable works of experimental techno heard in several years, a combination of tough, underground hip hop and the fractured neo-electro of Warp favorites Autechre and Plaid." Noel Dix of Exclaim! described the album as "a truly remarkable and creative record", praising its unpredictability. Tedd Kessler of the NME called the album "teeth-clattering but exhilarating", writing that "behind every wall of hip hop noise ... there lurks a heart-bursting tune and that's what makes it alluring." Pitchfork wrote that Herren had "painted a portrait of the peculiar state of our urbanity." Reviewing the album alongside two other Warp releases (Plaid's Double Figure and Squarepusher's Go Plastic), Uncut described Vocal Studies as "the pick of this crop" and concluded that it "genuinely seems like a next step for a genre in perpetual need of reinvention."

The BBC gave the album a mixed review, stating that "taken as a whole the album is pretty relentless" and the album was "best taken in small doses". PopMatters gave the album a negative review, writing that "the new sounds Herren creates are innovative and entertaining; he simply overdoes it."

== Legacy and influence ==
Vocal Studies + Uprock Narratives was named as one of the best albums of 2001 by several publications, including Pitchfork, Ottawa Citizen and Rolling Stone. The Globe and Mail named it the seventh best album of the year, with Carl Wilson writing that "of all the electronica-glich-IDM this year, [the album] is the only one I go back to as if it were the Rolling Stones." In 2005, Pitchfork ranked the album the 84th best of 2000–2004. Herren was overwhelmed with the positive reception the album received, exclaiming that "Most of it was so positive, but I'd also get a really strong reaction from people- some that want to kill me, 'cause they're under the impression that I'm trying to kill hip hop or something, and I'm like 'uh see ya, whatever man.'"

According to Pitchfork, the album was important for Warp, which had been seeking credibility after relocating their offices to New York City. Herren began acting as A&R member for the label, which had a reputation only for IDM, by introducing it to artists including Anti-Pop Consortium, Battles, and Flying Lotus. In 2011, after releasing The Only She Chapters, his eighth album for the label, Warp ended their relationship with Herren. The master recordings of his material stayed with the label.

Vocal Studies + Uprock Narratives was an influential album for contemporary musicians Amon Tobin and Nick Sanborn of Sylvan Esso. Tobin stated that his single "Verbal", from his acclaimed 2002 album Out from Out Where, was influenced by Prefuse 73. Sanborn spoke on the influence of Vocal Studies + Uprock Narratives, referring to it as one of the records that "gave me a doorway into hip hop. I know it's weird, but he was my entry point into instrumental hip hop, starting a domino effect that led me to Dilla, Madlib and the rest."

== Track listing ==
All tracks written by Scott Herren

No.	Title	Length
1.	"Radio Attack"	5:15
2.	"Nuno"	2:59
3.	"Life Death" (featuring Mikah 9)	3:23
4.	"Smile in Your Face"	2:28
5.	"Point to B"	4:01
6.	"Five Minutes Away"	3:15
7.	"Living Life" (featuring Rec Center)	2:43
8.	"Eve of Dextruction"	3:22
9.	"Last Night" (featuring Sam Prekop)	3:40
10.	"Cliché Intro"	1:48
11.	"Back in Time"	2:10
12.	"Hot Winter's Day"	2:12
13.	"Black List" (featuring Aesop Rock and MF Doom)	3:50
14.	"Untitled"	1:23
15.	"Afternoon Love In"	4:01
16.	"7th Message"	3:52

== Personnel ==
Credits adapted from Vocal Studies + Uprock Narratives liner notes.

- Scott Herren – performer, writer
- Estrada / Mofungo – design

== See also ==
- 2001 in music
