= Zammuto =

Zammuto may refer to:

- Zammuto (band), an American indie rock band
  - Zammuto (album)
