= The Flaming Lips with Prefuse 73 =

EP by the Flaming Lips and Prefuse 73
- Released: May 23, 2011
- Recorded: Earlier 2011
- Genres: Experimental rock, psychedelic rock
- Length: 18:03
- Labels: Warner Bros., Lovely Sorts of Death
- Producers: The Flaming Lips, Dave Fridmann, Prefuse 73

Flaming Lips EP chronology
| Gummy Song Skull (2011) | The Flaming Lips with Prefuse 73 (2011) | Gummy Song Fetus (2011) |

Prefuse 73 chronology
| The Only She Chapters (2011) | The Flaming Lips with Prefuse 73 (2011) | Rivington Não Rio (2015) |

The Flaming Lips with Prefuse 73 is a four-track collaboration EP between the Flaming Lips and Guillermo Scott Herren (a.k.a. Prefuse 73). The EP was limited to between 1000 and 2000 copies, pressed on randomly colored 12" vinyls so that no two look alike.

The Flaming Lips with Prefuse 73 was self-produced, self-released, and only sold at select record stores. Some copies were hand assembled and autographed by vocalist Wayne Coyne. The song "Supermoon Made Me Want to Pee" was later released on the album The Flaming Lips and Heady Fwends.

== Track listing ==
All tracks are written by Derek Brown, Kliph Scurlock, Michael Ivins, Prefuse 73, Steven Drozd, and Wayne Coyne.

Side A
| No. | Title | Length |
|---|---|---|
| 1. | "Supermoon Made Me Want To Pee" | 3:22 |
| 2. | "Heavy Star Movin'" | 5:53 |
| 3. | "Be Like That That That" | 4:34 |

Side B
| No. | Title | Length |
|---|---|---|
| 1. | "Guillermo's Bolero" | 4:14 |
