= Sacrifices (album) =

Studio album by Prefuse 73
- Released: May 25, 2018
- Length: 52:47
- Label: Lex

Prefuse 73 chronology
Every Color of Darkness (2015)	Sacrifices (2018)

Sacrifices is a 2018 studio album by Guillermo Scott Herren as under his alias of Prefuse 73. It was released on May 25, 2018.

== Style ==
Daniel Sylvester of Exclaim! found the sound of the album to be similar to Herren's earlier music, noting a return to "sparse hip-hop beats that defined his celebrated 2001 debut, Vocal Studies + Uprock Narratives.

== Release ==
Sacrifices was released on May 25, 2018 through Lex Records digitally, and received a physical release on June 15.

== Reception ==
Sylvester awarded the album a 7 out of 10 in Exclaim!, noting that "much of Sacrifices, including several of the album's under-one-minute tracks, borrow too much from Herren's early work, there simply so much to love about the simplicity of Herren's new material." and that it was "simply refreshing to hear Herren sound uncomplicated, uniform and so focused." Mehan Jayasuriya of Pitchfork gave the album a 5.9 out of ten, noting that the songs on Sacrifices "feel slight, with songs that too often fade into the background".

== Track listing ==
1. "New Salad Intro"
2. "Late to the Party"
3. "Her Desire is to be Left Alone"
4. "Transmission Nines"
5. "Without Anyone"
6. "The New Year"
7. "Gravure"
8. "Washington Heights Lovers"
9. "Basinkitarian"
10. "Silver & Gold"
11. "The World is Bigger"
12. "In the Blood"
13. "Transmission of Eights"
14. "Azares"
15. "Dripping With Excuses"
16. "False Charges"
17. "We Lost our Beat Tape in Mecca"
