= Lady Parts =

Lady Parts may refer to:

- Lady Parts, an American web series hosted by Sarah Hyland
- Lady Parts (album), a 2016 studio album by Fudge

== See also ==
- Leading Lady Parts, short comedy film
- We Are Lady Parts, British TV sitcom
