= The Books =

American-Dutch experimental-music duo

- Origin: New York City, U.S.
- Genres: Folktronica; indie electronic; post-rock; sound collage
- Years active: 2000–2012
- Labels: Tomlab, Temporary Residence Limited
- Members: Nick Zammuto; Paul de Jong

The Books were an American-Dutch duo, formed in New York City in 1999, consisting of guitarist and vocalist Nick Zammuto and cellist Paul de Jong. Their music typically incorporated samples of obscure sounds and speech. They released three critically acclaimed albums on the German label Tomlab, and released their fourth studio album, The Way Out, on Temporary Residence Limited.

== History ==
=== 1999–2002: Thoughts and Thought for Food ===
Zammuto and de Jong first met in New York City in 1999 as they shared the same apartment building. De Jong invited Zammuto to dinner at his apartment, where he played him some of his collection of audio and video samples, including a Shooby Taylor record. Zammuto said of their meeting that "we both kind of knew at that moment that we listened (to music) in interesting ways and had similar approaches to music". Soon after, they began playing what they considered pop music, in comparison to their own works, under the name the Books.

In 2000, the Books started work on their debut album, Thought for Food. Zammuto and de Jong moved often during this time, recording in New York, Los Angeles, Boston, and finally in the basement of a hostel in North Carolina where Zammuto worked for a while after hiking the Appalachian Trail. Thought for Food was released on October 22, 2002. Praised by critics for its distinctive sound, it featured extensive sampling from obscure sources coupled with mostly acoustic instrumentation.

=== 2002–2003: The Lemon of Pink ===
Shortly after the release of Thought for Food, the band relocated to North Adams, Massachusetts, near where Zammuto had graduated from Williams College in 1999, studying chemistry and visual arts. Zammuto and de Jong began the recording of The Lemon of Pink around this time. Anne Doerner, a guest vocalist on the album, said the process was much more arduous than the recording of Thought for Food, with Zammuto working on the album for five straight months.

The Lemon of Pink was released to critical acclaim on October 7, 2003. It is similar in style to Thought for Food, but oriented more around vocals performed mostly by Anne Doerner.

=== 2003–2006: Lost and Safe, Music for a French Elevator, Prefuse 73 Reads the Books ===
In 2004, the French Ministry of Culture asked the Books to compose music for a new elevator in their building. The Books released a Mini CD of this work in 2006, under the name Music for a French Elevator and Other Short Format Oddities by the Books.

On April 5, 2005, the Books released their third studio album, Lost and Safe. Zammuto has a greater vocal presence in this album, and the album was criticized for this change of sound. Aside from this, Lost and Safe was well received by critics. Throughout early 2005, the Books collaborated with the electronica artist Prefuse 73. The Books appear on his album Surrounded by Silence ("Pagina Dos"), and the EP Prefuse 73 Reads the Books E.P. collects remixes of material sourced from the Books' albums. The film "The Bridge" (a scientology drama) was released in 2006 and included "Enjoy Your Worries, You May Never Have Them Again" with permission of the band.

Before starting a three-month tour of North America in April 2006, the Books had played only one concert, in October 2003 at a festival in Chicago, Illinois. Zammuto wasn't always enthusiastic about performing The Books music live, stating in a 2012 interview with Seattle alternative station KEXP-FM that "...The Books started to feel like a glorified karaoke, because we would play in sync along with these electronic rhythms." Zammuto expressed apprehensiveness towards touring, but says it is necessary to make a living, given his belief that people downloading the Books' music via file-sharing has put him under financial strain.

=== 2006–2012: Hiatus, The Way Out and break-up ===
Following the release of Music for a French Elevator, the band took a break from recording to tend to their new families, tour in support of their albums, and pursue some of their own projects, which included Zammuto scoring a feature documentary about the Biosphere 2.

In 2007, the Books released Play All, a DVD of thirteen music videos and three previously unreleased tracks. The Play All videos are composed of found footage transformed into a collage that matches their music. The Books often screened these videos during their live performances.

The Books toured heavily between 2005 and 2007, including two tours in Europe and two Canadian shows. In early 2009 the Books covered the Nick Drake song "Cello Song" in collaboration with José González for the Red Hot Organization's Dark Was the Night fund-raising album.

The Books began working on The Way Out in late 2008. Zammuto spoke of the album's New Age themes in an interview in April 2009, saying they took samples from self-help and hypnotherapy cassettes. When asked to describe the album, Zammuto said "You're getting verrry sleepy." On April 5, 2010, the duo announced that The Way Out would be released through Temporary Residence Limited in July. On April 27 Pitchfork began streaming the track "Beautiful People", which Zammuto described as "a three part Christian harmony mixed with a sort of euro-disco-trash beat, an orchestra's worth of sampled brass and lyrics about the twelfth root of two (my favorite irrational number), trigonometry and tangrams". The album was released on July 20.

The Books played the ATP New York 2010 music festival in Monticello, New York, in September 2010 and then toured North America with The Black Heart Procession. The band had been chosen by Portishead and ATP to perform at the ATP I'll Be Your Mirror festival that they planned to curate in July 2011 at London's Alexandra Palace.

In January 2012, Nick Zammuto announced in an interview via Pitchfork that the Books were splitting up to focus on other projects.

On April 3, 2012, Nick Zammuto released Zammuto, under the moniker Zammuto. In 2014 he released another album, called Anchor.

Paul de Jong released two solo albums, IF and You Fucken Sucker, in 2015 and 2018 respectively.

== Musical style ==
The Books are commonly cited by critics to be of a genre of their own. Zammuto has described it as collage music. Paul de Jong described it as "the new folk music...[w]e make our own instruments, use our own libraries of sound bites while trying to create something universally human." Although they have said that their influences include Nirvana, David Bowie, Roxy Music as well as new wave and classical music, these do not show prominently in their music, though Zammuto was directly influenced by electronic musicians Boards of Canada and Aphex Twin. The Books' music usually consists of acoustic instrumentation of folk melodies usually played on guitar, cello, banjo and more, combined with a diverse range of samples obtained from cassettes found in thrift stores, which are digitally processed and edited. They also rarely use a drum kit in recordings and performances, instead favouring everyday objects like children's toys and filing cabinets, which were sampled and looped. Some observers contend that their music is aleatoric, but Zammuto has disagreed, saying the music is very tightly controlled.

== Discography ==
=== Studio albums ===
- Thought for Food (2002)
- The Lemon of Pink (2003)
- Lost and Safe (2005)
- The Way Out (2010)

=== Compilations ===
- A Dot in Time. (2012)

=== EP ===
- Music for a French Elevator and Other Short Format Oddities by the Books (2006)

=== DVDs ===
- Playall (2007)
- Freedom from Expression (2012)
