= Plux Quba =

Plux Quba: Música Para 70 Serpentes

Studio album by Nuno Canavarro
- Released: 1988
- Genres: Electroacoustic; soundscapes; ambient; glitch
- Length: 38:20
- Label: Ama Romanta
- Producer: Nuno Canavarro

Nuno Canavarro chronology
Plux Quba: Música Para 70 Serpentes (1988)	Mr. Wollogallu (1991)

Plux Quba: Música Para 70 Serpentes (Music for 70 Serpents), frequently shortened to Plux Quba, is the sole studio album by Portuguese musician Nuno Canavarro. Originally released on the private press label Ama Romanta in 1988, it was expanded and reissued in 1998.

Plux Quba consists of pieces based around sparse, electronically processed tones and heavily treated spoken word samples. It was released to very little initial reception, and would not see distribution outside of Portugal until it was reissued in 1998 by the record label Moikai. Following the re-release, it gradually gained a following for its innovative sound, and has been considered a precursor to the development of the IDM and glitch music styles. Musicians such as Jim O'Rourke, Mouse on Mars, Prefuse 73, and Oval have cited the album as an influence on their work.

== Background ==
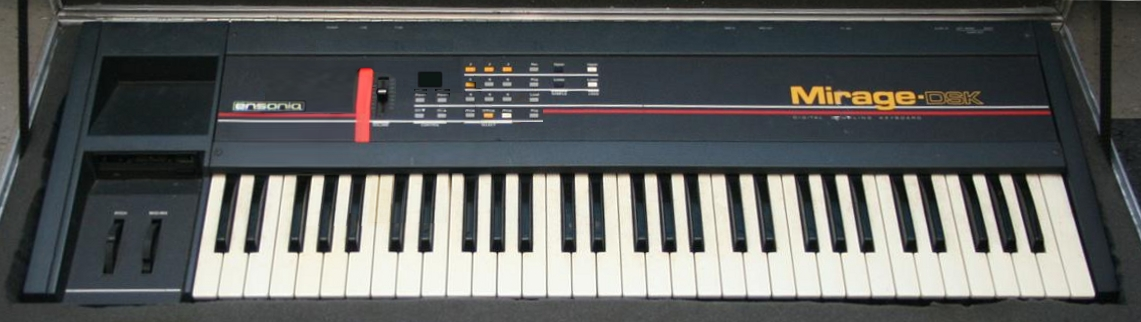
Canavarro used a Ensoniq Mirage sampling keyboard to compose Plux Quba.

Nuno Canavarro was raised in Lisbon, Portugal where he played keyboards in several local bands as a teenager. He composed the music for Plux Quba after studying composition at Institute of Sonology in the Netherlands for two years. Speaking about his time there, Canavarro noted that "There existed an incredible movement in terms of concerts, exhibitions, electro-acoustic music. I did not have the calmness, the concentration to do anything there. When I arrived, I wanted to work quickly."

Upon returning to Lisbon, Canavarro recorded the album in his home studio, with the aid of a Fostex 8-track tape recorder and an Ensoniq Mirage, a then state-of-the-art 8-bit digital sampling keyboard that he filled with pre-recorded, highly modified samples of television programs, radio voices, ethnic music tapes, and a melodica. Canavarro remarked on how the equipment affected the recording process: "With an eight-track recorder, and that system that lets a person turn anything into an instrument, I started to create a structure from it. Record yourself on a track, and then, later, start to add other things. You can, for example, record one track, and then another six or seven around it, and then finally erase the first one, these kinds of tricks. Or you could put stuff in reverse and record at different speeds. At the time, that was it."

Around this period, Canavarro previewed Plux Quba at a concert held at Instituto Franco-Português. This caught the attention of musician João Peste, who offered to release the album through his private press record label Ama Remanta. The vinyl master was cut directly from Canavarro's original tape, with no post-production work, although three songs had to be left off due to lack of cutting space. 500 copies of Plux Quba were pressed onto vinyl, though Canavarro was unsure how many actually sold, and that costs of production or the signature of a contract "did not exist". Canavarro contributed liner notes to the album, instructing listeners to play the record through speakers which are separated from each as far as possible at a low volume, starting from the track "Wask" onwards. The album's "enigmatic" title was chosen to "make it even weirder".

Despite Plux Quba being received positively by the local Lisbon music scene, its small circulation meant that it quickly fell into obscurity. Canavarro would go on to record one further album, a collaboration with Carlos Maria Trindade entitled Mr. Wollogallu, in 1991, before pursuing a career composing film soundtracks.

=== Rediscovery ===
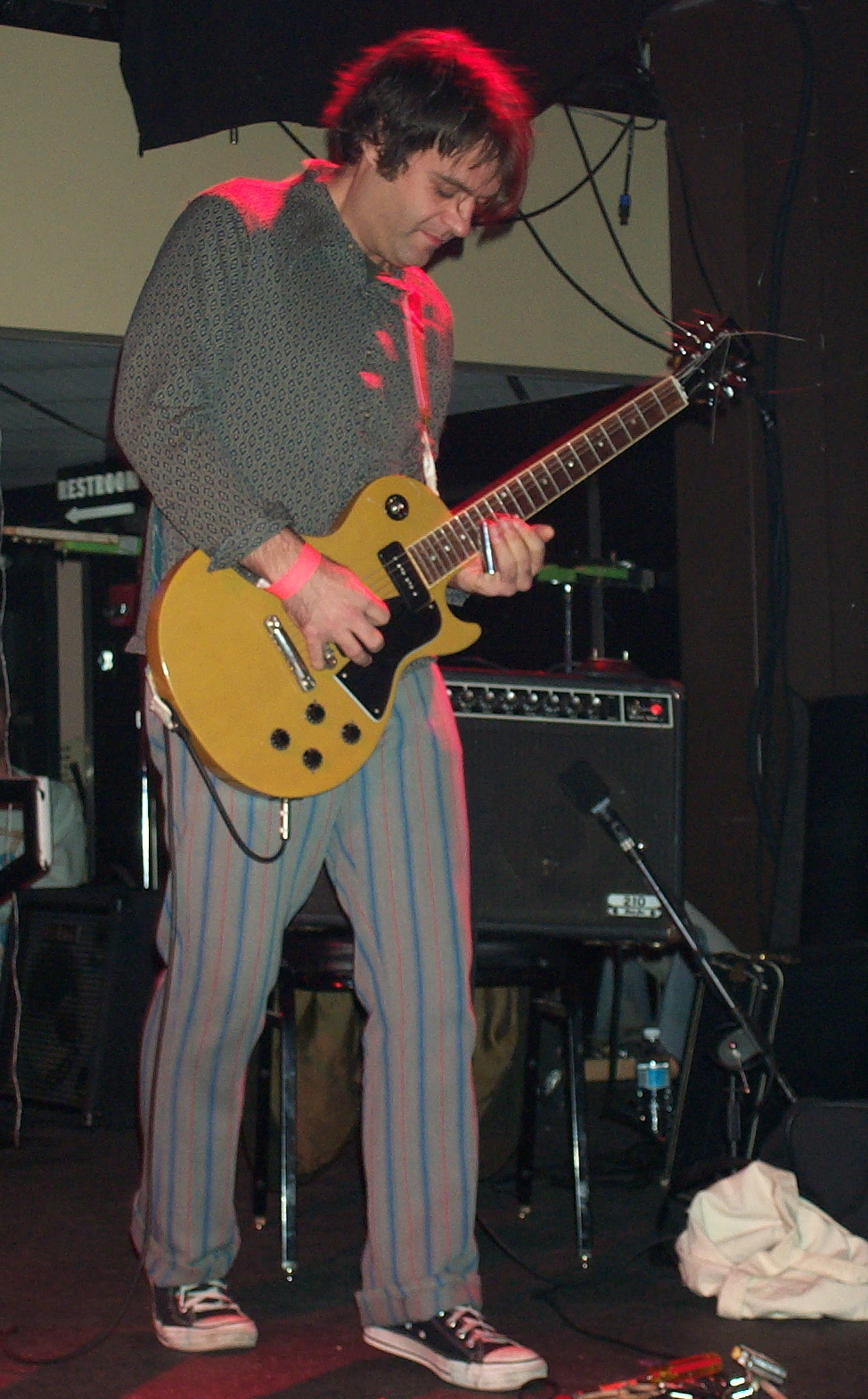
Jim O'Rourke, pictured here in 2003, brought the album to a wider audience after reissuing it through his Moikai label.

In 1991, Plux Quba was introduced by Christoph Heemann to several musicians, including Jim O'Rourke and Jan St. Werner of Mouse on Mars, during an informal listening party in Cologne, Germany. O'Rourke in particular grew to become a fan of the album, and a few years later met up with Rafael Toral, a musician and mutual friend of Canavarro, to track down the album's master tapes. O'Rourke eventually contacted Canavarro, and learned that he made the album whilst largely unaware of the developments happening elsewhere in electronic music, such as the ambient work of Brian Eno. With Canavarro's permission, Plux Quba was digitally remastered by Toral and released through O'Rourke's Moikai label in 1998, reinstating the three tracks that were left off the original pressing. The album would later be reissued again in 2015 through Drag City.

== Critical reception and legacy ==
The reissue of Plux Quba helped to bring the album a much wider audience outside of Portugal, and was met with an enthusiastic response from critics. In 2018, Andy Beta of Pitchfork placed Plux Quba at 181 on the site's Top 200 Best Albums of The 1980s article, stating that:

Thirty years on, Portuguese composer Nuno Canavarro's lone solo work remains as enigmatic and inscrutable as the day it was first released. Plux Quba was discovered by wily experimenters like Jim O'Rourke, Mouse on Mars, and Oval in the '90s; from there, it became an influence on early ’00s clicks-and-cuts aesthetes, adventurous producers like Jan Jelinek and Fennesz, and present-day shapeshifters like Oneohtrix Point Never and Yves Tumor. As such a heady list of admirers suggests, Canavarro's music eludes easy classification. Made up of chiming electronics, processed cries and whispers, electroacoustic études, smeared noise, and scrambled lullabies, Plux Quba skips and glitches between one sound world and the next. At first, it can feel jarring and cracked, yet such shards slowly assemble into an exquisite whole. Plux Quba plays like some long-lost memory, conjuring evocative emotions before fragmenting and falling back out of reach again.

In 2001, fellow Pitchfork columnist Mark Richardson referenced the album in his article "Fuck Words of Wisdom", citing it as an example of how speech is deconstructed in music, saying that "Plux Quba is filled with haunting manipulated vocals, where words are stripped of specific meaning but not emotional content." Richardson compared the album to Robert Ashley's Automatic Writing which he cited as a possible influence. Musician Sam Prekop of the Sea and Cake praised the album, declaring to be "the high-water mark, in my opinion, of electronic music. It's a really delicate, beautiful, and really weird record." In 2001, producer Prefuse 73 recorded the track "Nuno", which predominantly samples "Wask", for his album Vocal Studies + Uprock Narratives.

Reflecting on Plux Quba years after its release, Canavarro described it as a "totally isolated" work and that he could "hardly believe" how he managed to make it, though remarked that "on the other hand, the very limitation of my technical means, in this case, I think worked in my favor, because it led to my creativity. I got to use its own defects, at the level of the software of the sampler. It was a very unstable apparatus, there were some beastly things that, when forcing it to work hard, responded somewhat unpredictably. It was beastly for the kind of music I wanted to do."

== Track listing ==
All compositions by Nuno Canavarro.

No.	Title	Length
1.	"Untitled"	1:30
2.	"Alsee"	0:52
3.	"O Fundo Escuro de Alsee"	1:58
4.	"Untitled"	1:25
5.	"Untitled"	4:21
6.	"Untitled"	1:18
7.	"Untitled"	2:09
8.	"Wask"	5:38
9.	"Untitled"	2:45
10.	"Wolfie"	2:14
11.	"Crimine"	4:34
12.	"Bruma"	1:44
13.	"Untitled"	1:01
14.	"Cave"	4:17
15.	"Untitled"	2:43
