= Security Screenings =

EP by Prefuse 73
- Released: February 6, 2006
- Genre: Electronic
- Length: 41:25
- Label: Warp
- Producer: Prefuse 73

Prefuse 73 chronology
Prefuse 73 Reads the Books E.P. (2005)	Security Screenings (2006)	Preparations (2007)

Professional ratings
Aggregate scores
Source	Rating
Metacritic	68/100
Review scores
Source	Rating
AllMusic	3.5/5 stars
Pitchfork	6.9/10
PopMatters	6/10 stars

Security Screenings is an EP by Prefuse 73. It was released on Warp Records in 2006.

Although Security Screenings is actually as long as a proper LP, it is described as being an EP by the artist. It is not considered to be a follow-up to the 2005 album, Surrounded by Silence.

The original cover art displayed the artist's name as "Prefuse LXIII", which means "Prefuse 63". This was corrected in later printings.

== Track listing ==
No.	Title	Length
1.	"The Letter: 'P'"	1:17
2.	"With Dirt and Two Texts: Afternoon Version"	3:26
3.	"Illiterate Interlude"	0:28
4.	"Keeping Up with Your Quota"	3:16
5.	"No Special Bed"	0:31
6.	"Weight Watching"	2:34
7.	"When the Grip Lets You Go"	2:55
8.	"Another One Long Gone"	2:08
9.	"Always It's Gonna Be Like That"	1:07
10.	"Creating Cyclical Headaches" (featuring Four Tet)	3:27
11.	"Awakening to a....."	0:59
12.	"With Dirt and Two Texts: Later Version with Love"	3:08
13.	"No Origin"	3:41
14.	"One Star and Three Stripes"	1:42
15.	"Mud in Your Mouth"	2:43
16.	"Breathe"	0:49
17.	"Matrimonioids ..... (For Elvin + Susana Estela)"	3:45
18.	"We Leave You in a Cloud of Thick Smoke and Sleep Outro / Alternate Hidden Outro" (featuring Babatunde Adebimpe and Chuck Peterson)	3:28

== Charts ==
Chart	Peak position
US Top Dance/Electronic Albums (Billboard)	21
