= Preparations (album) =

Studio album by Prefuse 73
- Released: October 23, 2007
- Genre: Electronic
- Length: 46:20
- Label: Warp
- Producer: Prefuse 73

Prefuse 73 chronology
Security Screenings (2006)	Preparations (2007)	Everything She Touched Turned Ampexian (2009)

Professional ratings
Aggregate scores
Source	Rating
Metacritic	64/100
Review scores
Source	Rating
AllMusic	3.5/5 stars
Billboard	favorable
Drowned in Sound	8/10
MusicOMH	favorable
Pitchfork	5.3/10 (Preparations); 7.1/10 (Interregnums)
PopMatters	6/10 stars
Spin	favorable
Stylus Magazine	B+
Tiny Mix Tapes	4/5 marks

Preparations is a studio album by Prefuse 73. It was released on Warp Records in 2007.

Unlike the 2006 EP Security Screenings, Preparations is considered the proper follow-up to the 2005 album Surrounded by Silence.

The album includes a 15-track bonus disc entitled Interregnums, which features "unheard explorations into orchestral soundtrack music", including compositions played by live musicians.

== Track listing ==
Preparations
No.	Title	Length
1.	"From the East Intro"	0:31
2.	"Beaten Thursdays"	3:43
3.	"Aborted Hugs"	1:29
4.	"The Class of 73 Bells" (featuring School of Seven Bells)	4:58
5.	"Girlfriend Boyfriend"	3:22
6.	"Smoking Red" (featuring John Stanier)	2:55
7.	"Prog Version Slowly Crushed"	3:32
8.	"Noreaster Cheer"	2:30
9.	"Let It Ring"	3:08
10.	"17 Seconds Interlude" (featuring Tobias Lilja)	1:01
11.	"I Knew You Were Gonna Go"	4:01
12.	"Pomade Suite Version One"	5:46
13.	"Spaced + Dissonant"	4:14
14.	"Preparation Outro Version"	5:02
15.	"Recycled Suite" (Japanese edition bonus track)	5:07

Interregnums
No.	Title	Length
1.	"For Her Non-Place"	5:30
2.	"Preparation One"	0:45
3.	"Thorough Light"	3:45
4.	"Spacious and Dissonant Part 2"	6:50
5.	"Pitu"	5:18
6.	"Preparation Two"	0:49
7.	"Over Ensembles"	4:28
8.	"The Last"	4:40
9.	"Sunbeamstress"	2:09
10.	"Humidity Interlude"	1:35
11.	"The Ground We Lift"	3:23
12.	"Preparation Three"	0:56
13.	"Let It Ring Ensembles"	4:21
14.	"Out We Will Go"	2:15
15.	"Prepared as It Was"	4:57
