= Soundvision: In Stereo =

Studio album by Lawless Element
- Released: September 20, 2005
- Genre: Hip hop
- Length: 39:12
- Label: Babygrande Records
- Producer: Magnif; J Dilla; Young RJ; Madlib

Professional ratings
Review scores
Source	Rating
Allmusic	link
URB	link

Soundvision: In Stereo is the debut album from Detroit hip hop duo Lawless Element, released September 20, 2005 on Babygrande Records. The album is produced by group member Magnif, with additional instrumentals and production supplied by J Dilla & Young RJ and Madlib. Guest appearances come from Dilla, Melanie Rutherford, Phat Kat, Big Tone and Diverse. The duo's earlier singles, "The Shining" and "High" are both featured here, as well as the single "Rules Pt. 2" and remixed versions of their past tracks "Represent" and "...Something".

== Track listing ==
#	Title	Producer(s)	Performer (s)
1	"Soundvision"	Magnif	Magnif, Griot
2	"Crew"	Magnif	Magnif, P. Dot, Selfsays, Griot
3	"The Shining"	J Dilla, Young RJ	Magnif, Griot
4	"One Night"	Magnif	Griot, Melanie Rutherford, Magnif
5	"Rules Pt. 2"	Magnif	Magnif, Griot
6	"Represent/Motown"	Magnif	Magnif, Griot, Big Tone, Phat Kat
7	"Love"	Magnif	Magnif, Griot, J Dilla
8	"Words From Dilla"	Magnif	J Dilla
9	"High"	Madlib	Magnif, Griot
10	"...Something (Remix)"	Magnif	Griot, Diverse, Magnif
11	"Move"	Magnif	Magnif, Melanie Rutherford, Griot
12	"Higher"	Magnif	Magnif, Griot
