= Lawless Element =

American hip hop group

- Origin: Detroit, Michigan
- Genres: Hip hop
- Years active: 2003–2006
- Label: Babygrande Records
- Members: Magnif; Griot

Lawless Element is an underground hip hop duo from Detroit, Michigan. The duo is composed of cousins Griot (West African for "Storyteller", born Alfred Austin) as emcee and Magnif (born Kavi Tapsico) as DJ, producer and emcee. The duo of Magnif and Griot became engulfed in hip hop culture at the ages of 6 and 9, and spent their teenage years honing their skills on the production boards and on the microphone. At the ages of 16 and 19, the duo released their first single, titled "Mic Check", in 2003 on Running Man Records. The next year, the duo hooked up with fellow Detroit native, producer J Dilla, to release the single "The Shining". In early 2005, LE worked with Dilla's Jaylib partner Madlib on the single "High", which landed them a deal with popular independent rap label Babygrande Records. Their debut album, Soundvision: In Stereo, was released in September 2005 to generally positive reviews. Soundvision featured production from Magnif, J Dilla and Madlib and guest appearances from Dilla, Melanie Rutherford, Phat Kat, Big Tone, P.Dot, SelfSays and Diverse. "Rules Pt. 2" was the album's lead single, and also became the duo's first music video. URB magazine gave the album 4 out of 5 stars and stated that it was "Heavily influenced by the golden age of De La Soul, Pete Rock and DJ Premier" and that it featured "12 top-shelf tracks" The album also earned the duo Featured Artist status on the Okayplayer website. Magnif has continued production work for a number of other underground acts, and released a mixtape titled SupaBeatMaker in late 2005. The duo has announced plans for their second album, tentatively titled Evil, scheduled for released in 2008 on Babygrande Records. Magnif is also planning the release of a full-length production and solo album.

== Discography ==
=== Albums ===
Album information
Soundvision: In Stereo
- Released: September 20, 2005
- Label: Babygrande Records
- Singles: "The Shining", "High", "Rules Pt. 2"/"Love"

=== Singles ===
Single information
"Mic Check"
- Released: 2003
- Label: Running Man Records
- B-side: "Wordplay"
"The Shining"
- Released: April 6, 2004
- Label: Raw Material Records
- B-side: "Represent"
"High"
- Released: February 23, 2005
- Label: Raw Material Records
- B-side: "...Something"
"Rules Pt. 2"
- Released: September 16, 2005
- Label: RMR/Babygrande Records
- B-side: "Love"
