= Rivington Não Rio =

Studio album by Prefuse 73
- Released: May 12, 2015
- Length: 43:37
- Label: Temporary Residence Limited
- Producer: Guillermo Scott Herren

Prefuse 73 chronology
Forsyth Garden (2015)	Rivington Não Rio (2015)	Every Color of Darkness (2015)

Rivington Não Rio is a studio album by American producer Guillermo Scott Herren under his alias of Prefuse 73, released by Temporary Residence Limited in 2015. Rivington Não Rio was Herren's first album since 2011's The Only She Chapters, after which he was told by his label that they would not be accepting more material from him. After the release, he spent his time away from music and then later collaborating with other artists and attempting to start a new label called Yellow Year.

After four years since his past album, Herren signed to Temporary Residence Limited and released two EPs along with Rivington Não Rio in 2015. The album received generally favorable reviews.

== Background and production ==
In 2011, after releasing The Only She Chapters, Herron's eighth album for Warp, the label informed Herren that it would not accept any more material from him. This led to the rights to the master recordings of his material to be kept with the label. Herren was not sure why he was dropped by Warp and felt unsure about what direction to take next. Herren worked with Teebs (real name Mtendere Mandowa) creating a group called Sons of the Morning. In 2013, he launched a label called Yellow Year, which would release an album titled Speak Soon a collaboration between Herren and many contemporary and older musicians including Mandowa and Chung as well as the reclusive Swiss musician Dimitri Grimm, a.k.a. Dimlite. Herren embarked on a month-long American tour in January 2014 under the Yellow Year banner, but the album was not released due to creative and operational differences. The remainder of 2014 was spent looking for a label to release his new material. Under the recommendation of musicians Nigel Godrich and Kieran Hebden, Herron signed to Temporary Residence Limited.

Including the album, Herron released two EPs through the label in 2015. The music on the EPs was written in a six-month period following the album being handed in at the label.

== Release ==
Rivington Não Rio was released on May 12, 2015 on the Temporary Residence Limited label. The album was part of a group of releases, including the Forsyth Garden EP on April 28, 2015 and the Every Color of Darkness EP on July 14, 2015.

== Reception ==
Professional ratings
Aggregate scores
Source	Rating
Metacritic	(76/100)
Review scores
Source	Rating
AllMusic	4/5 stars
Consequence of Sound	B+
Exclaim!	(8/10)
Pitchfork	(7.8/10)
PopMatters	6/10 stars
The Skinny	3/5 stars

At Metacritic, which assigns a normalised rating out of 100 to reviews from mainstream critics, the album has received an average score of 76, based on 6 reviews indicating "generally favorable reviews".

== Track listing ==
No.	Title	Length
1.	"Señora 95 (Intro)"	1:00
2.	"Applauded Assumptions"	5:21
3.	"Quiet One" (featuring Rob Crow)	4:09
4.	"Through a Lit and Darkened Path, Pts. 1 & 2"	6:48
5.	"Inside"	4:21
6.	"Infrared" (featuring Sam Dew)	3:27
7.	"Jacinto Lyric Range"	3:20
8.	"140 Jabs Interlude" (featuring Milo and Busdriver)	2:27
9.	"See More Than Just Stars" (featuring Helado Negro)	4:28
10.	"Mojav Mating Call"	5:00
11.	"Open Nerve Farewells"	3:16
