= One A.M. (album) =

Studio album by Diverse
- Released: November 4, 2003
- Genre: Hip-hop
- Length: 41:31
- Label: Chocolate Industries
- Producer: RJD2; Madlib; Prefuse 73; K. Kruz; Overflo; Jeff Parker; Ted Sirota; DJ Lok

Diverse chronology
Move EP (2001)	One A.M. (2003)

Singles from One A.M.
- 1. "Certified" Released: 2002; 2. "Explosive" Released: 2003; 3. "Jus Biz" Released: 2004; 4. "Big Game" Released: 2004

One A.M. is the first studio album by American rapper Diverse. It was released on Chocolate Industries in 2003. The album features production by RJD2, Prefuse 73, Madlib and Jeff Parker. Guest appearances include Vast Aire, Lyrics Born and Jean Grae.

== Critical reception ==
Professional ratings
Review scores
Source	Rating
AllMusic	4/5 stars
Dusted Magazine	favorable
Exclaim!	favorable
Pitchfork	8.0/10
Prefix	8.0/10
Stylus Magazine	A−

Steve Huey of AllMusic gave the album 4 stars out of 5, calling it "[a] thoroughly excellent debut." He added, "Diverse's greatest strength as a rapper is his flow, as he spins a dense web of painstakingly constructed language over the beats as though he were spreading soft butter on toast."

Gabe Gloden of Stylus Magazine gave the album a grade of A−, stating: "There's not one dud to be found on One A.M., and at a lean 42 minutes, Diverse deserves at least that much of your time." Noel Dix of Exclaim! said: "Along with Vast Aire of Cannibal Ox and the mighty Jean Grae, there is simply far too much talent on this effort to go unnoticed."

== Track listing ==
No.	Title	Producer(s)	Length
1.	"Certified"	RJD2	3:48
2.	"Uprock"	RJD2	3:33
3.	"Big Game" (featuring Vast Aire)	RJD2	3:58
4.	"Ain't Right"	Madlib	4:01
5.	"Jus Biz"	Prefuse 73	4:34
6.	"Blindman"	K. Kruz	3:09
7.	"Explosive" (featuring Lyrics Born)	RJD2	3:30
8.	"Under the Hammer / Interlude" (featuring Jean Grae)	RJD2; Prefuse 73	4:04
9.	"747 (Flyin)"	Overflo	2:32
10.	"Interlude (Amberglis)"	Prefuse 73	0:40
11.	"Leaving"	Prefuse 73	3:46
12.	"In Accordance"	Jeff Parker; Ted Sirota; DJ Lok	3:56
Total length:			41:31

Japanese edition bonus track
No.	Title	Producer(s)	Length
13.	"Build"	K. Kruz	4:11
Total length:			45:42

Australian edition bonus track
No.	Title	Producer(s)	Length
13.	"Wylin Out (RJD2 Remix)" (featuring Mos Def)	RJD2	4:25
Total length:			47:56

== Personnel ==
Credits adapted from liner notes.

- Diverse – vocals, lyrics, mixing (12), arrangement (12)
- RJD2 – production (1–3, 7, 8), turntables (1, 2, 7), mixing (1, 2, 7, 8)
- Vast Aire – vocals (3), lyrics (3)
- DJ Precyse – turntables (3)
- Madlib – production (4)
- Prefuse 73 – production (5, 8, 10, 11), instrumentation (5, 11), backing vocals (5), mixing (5, 10, 11)
- K. Kruz – production (6)
- Lyrics Born – vocals (7), lyrics (7)
- Jean Grae – vocals (8), lyrics (8)
- Overflo – production (9), mixing (9)
- Jeff Parker – guitar (12), production (12)
- Ted Sirota – drums (12), production (12)
- R. Mazurek – horns (12)
- DJ Lok – additional production (12), recording (12)
- T. Foggi – recording, mixing (3, 4, 6, 12), arrangement (12)
- Mark Fellows – mastering
- Struggle Inc. – design
- B+ – photography
