= Extinguished: Outtakes =

EP by Prefuse 73
- Released: August 25, 2003
- Genres: Hip-hop, electronica
- Length: 37:23
- Label: Warp
- Producer: Prefuse 73

Prefuse 73 chronology
One Word Extinguisher (2003)	Extinguished: Outtakes (2003)	Surrounded by Silence (2005)

Professional ratings
Review scores
Source	Rating
AllMusic	4/5 stars
Pitchfork	8.2/10
Stylus Magazine	B
XLR8R	favorable

Extinguished: Outtakes is an EP by Prefuse 73. It was released on Warp in 2003. It peaked at number 14 on Billboard Top Dance/Electronic Albums chart.

== Critical reception ==
Ian Mathers of Stylus Magazine gave Extinguished: Outtakes a grade of B, saying, "Although the tracks are uniformly of high quality, there's not a lot of purchase for the listener into the constantly-shifting soundscape, which means that at its best Herren creates true ambient music; easy to ignore, but vastly rewarding if your attention is fully focused."

== Track listing ==
No.	Title	Length
1.	"Suite for the Ways Things Change"	4:44
2.	"Tel Aviv's Gravel Toothbrush"	1:14
3.	"Pase Rock's Preestyle"	0:44
4.	"I Got No Time for Rearviews"	1:27
5.	"Dubs That Don't Match"	2:16
6.	"Between Man and Woman"	1:34
7.	"Martinique Was My Girl"	0:59
8.	"Culturaluhorgasm"	0:16
9.	"Whisper in My Ear to Tell Me You Hate Me"	0:45
10.	"One for the Crime Scene, a Bullet for Your Time"	1:16
11.	"Vikings Invade the Mediterranean but Don't Leave"	1:26
12.	"Diarrhea Takes Over Your Life"	1:29
13.	"I Can't Get My Eyes Off"	0:44
14.	"For Some but Not for Me"	1:28
15.	"Sao Paulo Arkansas"	1:23
16.	"Coming into Something Better"	0:30
17.	"Humor Judgements"	0:21
18.	"Wronge Posture"	0:49
19.	"3 Sounds from 94"	1:05
20.	"Robot Snares Got No Cadence or Balance"	3:17
21.	"Key Intro 99"	1:42
22.	"Drum Machine, Cello, Headwrap"	6:03
23.	"If They Died and They Were Yours"	1:51

== Charts ==
Chart	Peak position
US Top Dance/Electronic Albums (Billboard)	14
