= The Way Out (The Books album) =

Studio album by the Books
- Released: July 20, 2010
- Genre: Folktronica; post-rock; sound collage; musique concrète
- Length: 50:12
- Label: Temporary Residence
- Producer: The Books; Drew Brown

The Books chronology
Music for a French Elevator and Other Short Format Oddities by the Books (2006)	The Way Out (2010)	A Dot in Time (2012)

Professional ratings
Aggregate scores
Source	Rating
AnyDecentMusic?	7.5/10
Metacritic	81/100
Review scores
Source	Rating
AllMusic	4/5 stars
The A.V. Club	A
Consequence	4/5 stars
The Independent	4/5 stars
Los Angeles Times	3/4 stars
Mojo	3/5 stars
Pitchfork	7.7/10
Spin	7/10
Urb	4/5 stars
XLR8R	9/10

The Way Out is the fourth and final studio album by American musical duo the Books. It was released on July 20, 2010, by Temporary Residence Limited, and was the duo's first album to be issued by the label.

The Way Out received mostly positive reviews from critics. The album's cover is a take on that of early 1970s editions of The Way, an illustrated version of The Living Bible.

== Composition ==
The Way Out has been called a sound collage. Resident Advisor said that similarly to the duo's earlier album Lost and Safe (2005), The Way Out "consists of bright collages, some of which have pop or folk-style vocals." Paste Magazine called it the duo's "most dazzling work to date" in which they "[strike] an ideal balance between found-sound collage and original vocalizations", with a greater emphasis on soundbytes.

NME included it in their list of the "Most Underrated Albums of 2010"; writer Chris Parkin called it "[a] pathologically precise album from NYC's spoddiest duo, who've leavened their clever-clever musique concrete with rib-tickling funnies in a seamless fusion of polyrhythms, sampled hypnotherapy tapes and perfectly skewiff melodies."

== Track listing ==
All tracks are written by The Books (Paul de Jong and Nick Zammuto).

No.	Title	Length
1.	"Group Autogenics I"	3:44
2.	"IDKT"	1:42
3.	"I Didn't Know That"	3:38
4.	"A Cold Freezin' Night"	3:22
5.	"Beautiful People"	2:53
6.	"I Am Who I Am"	3:02
7.	"Chain of Missing Links"	4:31
8.	"All You Need Is a Wall"	3:45
9.	"Thirty Incoming"	4:57
10.	"A Wonderful Phrase by Gandhi"	0:22
11.	"We Bought the Flood"	5:04
12.	"The Story of Hip Hop"	4:30
13.	"Free Translator"	3:50
14.	"Group Autogenics II"	4:52
Total length:		50:12

== Personnel ==
Credits are adapted from the album's liner notes.

The Books

- Paul de Jong – mastering, mixing, production, recording
- Nick Zammuto – mastering, mixing, production, recording

Additional personnel

- Drew Brown – additional production and engineering
- Brendon Downey – mastering, mixing

== Charts ==
Chart (2010)	Peak position
US Billboard 200	165
US Heatseekers Albums (Billboard)	5
US Independent Albums (Billboard)	22
