= Prefuse 73 Reads the Books E.P. =

EP by Prefuse 73 and the Books
- Released: July 11, 2005
- Genres: Electronica, instrumental hip-hop
- Length: 22:51
- Label: Warp
- Producers: Prefuse 73, The Books

Prefuse 73 chronology
Surrounded by Silence (2005)	Prefuse 73 Reads the Books E.P. (2005)	Security Screenings (2006)

Professional ratings
Aggregate scores
Source	Rating
Metacritic	71/100
Review scores
Source	Rating
AllMusic	3/5 stars
Exclaim!	favorable
Pitchfork	7.5/10
PopMatters	5/10 stars
Stylus Magazine	B

Prefuse 73 Reads the Books E.P. is a collaborative EP by Prefuse 73 and the Books. It was released on Warp in 2005. "Pagina Ocho" features a vocal contribution from Claudia Maria Deheza. Prefuse 73's third studio album, Surrounded by Silence, includes "Pagina Dos" from the EP, as well as many other collaborations with artists other than The Books. The EP peaked at number 23 on the Billboard Top Dance/Electronic Albums chart.

== Critical reception ==
At Metacritic, which assigns a weighted average score out of 100 to reviews from mainstream critics, the EP received an average score of 71% based on 8 reviews, indicating "generally favorable reviews".

Noel Dix of Exclaim! said, "If you dig the sensitive side of Prefuse's work, which is usually some of his most genius attempts, then this EP is essential."

== Track listing ==
No.	Title	Length
1.	"Pagina Uno. Introduccion"	0:09
2.	"Pagina Dos"	2:30
3.	"Pagina Tres"	2:35
4.	"Pagina Cuatro"	0:56
5.	"Pagina Cinco"	5:20
6.	"Pagina Seis"	5:00
7.	"Pagina Siete"	2:31
8.	"Pagina Ocho" (featuring Claudia Maria Deheza)	3:50

== Charts ==
Chart	Peak position
US Top Dance/Electronic Albums (Billboard)	23
