= The '92 vs. '02 Collection =

EP by Prefuse 73
- Released: June 24, 2002
- Genre: Instrumental hip-hop
- Label: Warp
- Producer: Scott Herren

Prefuse 73 chronology
Vocal Studies + Uprock Narratives (2001)	The '92 vs. '02 Collection (2002)	One Word Extinguisher (2003)

The '92 vs. '02 Collection is a 2002 EP by Guillermo Scott Herren released under the alias of Prefuse 73. It was released by Warp in 2002.

== Style ==
Unlike his previous album Vocal Studies + Uprock Narratives, Herren styles was described by Exclaim! as "opting for more electronic-based noises, rather than chopped up hip-hop beats" while AllMusic called it a "calmer and more collected approach to instrumental hip hop".

== Release ==
The '92 vs. '02 Collection was released in by Warp on June 24, 2002. The album was released on compact disc, vinyl and as an internet download.

== Reception ==
Professional ratings
Review scores
Source	Rating
AllMusic	3/5 stars
Pitchfork	(7.7/10)

Pitchfork gave the EP a 7.7 out of 10 rating, noting that the album was not a retread of his previous LP Vocal Studies + Uprock Narratives and not a sudden change of style either. The review highlighted the tracks "Desks.Pencils.Bottles" and "When Irony Wears Thin" while finding the final two tracks as "slightly less ear-catching." PopMatters praised the album specifically citing the track "Love You Bring" as "essential", only finding an issue with the releases brevity. Exclaim! echoed PopMatters statement of "Love You Bring" as a highlight. AllMusic referred to the release as a "pretty darn good one", but also found the album too short.

== Track listing ==
Track listing from album liner notes.

No.	Title	Length
1.	"Desks.Pencils.Bottles"	3:21
2.	"When Irony Wears Thin"	3:19
3.	"It Never Entered"	4:25
4.	"Love You Bring"	5:09

== Personnel ==
Credits adapted from The '92 vs. '02 Collection liner notes.

- Scott Herren – producer
- Tent – design
- Douglas Savage – photography
