= Everything She Touched Turned Ampexian =

Studio album by Prefuse 73
- Released: April 14, 2009
- Genre: Electronic
- Length: 48:26
- Label: Warp
- Producer: Prefuse 73

Prefuse 73 chronology
Preparations (2007)	Everything She Touched Turned Ampexian (2009)	The Forest of Oversensitivity (2009)

Professional ratings
Aggregate scores
Source	Rating
Metacritic	67/100
Review scores
Source	Rating
AllMusic	3.5/5 stars
Drowned in Sound	7/10
Pitchfork	6.5/10
PopMatters	7/10 stars
Resident Advisor	2.5/5

Everything She Touched Turned Ampexian is a studio album by Prefuse 73. It was released on Warp Records on April 14, 2009.

== Track listing ==
No.	Title	Length
1.	"Periodic Measurements of Infrequent Smiles"	0:51
2.	"Hairy Faces (Stress)"	0:36
3.	"Parachute Parador"	1:04
4.	"NoNo"	0:14
5.	"Punish"	1:19
6.	"Half Up Front"	0:37
7.	"Sexual Fantasy Scale"	0:45
8.	"DEC. Machine Funk All ERA's"	3:48
9.	"Get Em High"	0:48
10.	"Ampexian Tribe of a Lesser Time"	1:01
11.	"When Is a Good Time?"	0:47
12.	"Fountains of Spring"	1:25
13.	"Whipcream Eyepatch"	1:12
14.	"Regalo"	3:41
15.	"Rubber Stems"	0:40
16.	"Oh Is It"	0:38
17.	"Four Reels Collide"	2:48
18.	"Fringertip Trajectories"	0:41
19.	"Violent Bathroom Exchange"	1:36
20.	"Natures Uplifting Revenge"	1:59
21.	"Yuletide"	1:29
22.	"Simple Loop Choir"	3:19
23.	"No Lights Still Rock" (featuring Dimlite)	3:36
24.	"Gaslamp Killer Feedback Text"	0:53
25.	"Digan Lo"	4:16
26.	"Preperation's Kids Choir"	2:41
27.	"Pitch Pipe"	1:20
28.	"Periodic Measurements of Infrequent Frowns"	0:36
29.	"Formal Dedications"	4:03

== Charts ==
Chart	Peak position
US Top Dance/Electronic Albums (Billboard)	15
