= Thought for Food =

Studio album by the Books
- Released: June 3, 2002
- Genre: Folktronica; post-rock; sound collage
- Length: 38:31
- Label: Tomlab

The Books chronology
Thought for Food (2002)	The Lemon of Pink (2003)

Alternative cover
- 2011 reissue

Thought for Food is the debut studio album by American musical duo the Books. It was released on June 3, 2002 by Tomlab. The album exhibits the duo's characteristic sampling from a variety of mundane and instrumental sources.

== Critical reception ==
Professional ratings
Review scores
Source	Rating
AllMusic	4.5/5 stars
Pitchfork	9.0/10
Stylus Magazine	9.1/10
Tiny Mix Tapes	4.5/5
Tom Hull – on the Web	B+

Pitchfork ranked Thought for Food as the fourth best album of 2002, and as the 125th best album of the 2000s. In 2015, Spin ranked Thought for Food at number 285 on its list of "The 300 Best Albums of the Past 30 Years".

== Track listing ==
All music is composed by The Books (Paul de Jong and Nick Zammuto).

No.	Title	Length
1.	"Enjoy Your Worries, You May Never Have Them Again"	4:05
2.	"Read, Eat, Sleep"	3:46
3.	"All Bad Ends All"	2:42
4.	"Contempt"	3:20
5.	"All Our Base Are Belong to Them"	4:18
6.	"Thankyoubranch"	5:05
7.	"Motherless Bastard"	4:11
8.	"Mikey Bass"	2:52
9.	"Excess Straussess"	2:06
10.	"Getting the Done Job"	3:49
11.	"A Dead Fish Gains the Power of Observation"	1:07
12.	"Deafkids"	1:10
Total length:		38:31

== Personnel ==
Credits are adapted from the liner notes of the 2002 and 2011 issues of the album.

The Books

- Paul de Jong – music, mastering, mixing
- Nick Zammuto – music, mastering, mixing

Additional personnel

- Anne Doerner – fiddle and harmony vocals on "Getting the Done Job"
- Frieda Luczak – cover design
- Mikey Zammuto – bass on "Mikey Bass"
