= One Word Extinguisher =

Studio album by Prefuse 73
- Released: May 6, 2003
- Genres: IDM; electronica; glitch; hip-hop
- Length: 60:03
- Label: Warp
- Producer: Prefuse 73

Prefuse 73 chronology
| The '92 vs. '02 Collection (2002) | One Word Extinguisher (2003) | Extinguished: Outtakes (2003) |

One Word Extinguisher is the second studio album by American electronic music producer Prefuse 73. It was released on Warp on May 6, 2003. It peaked at number 41 on the Billboard Independent Albums chart.

One Word Extinguisher is described as a "breakup album," and represents musical styles spanning multiple genres.

== Critical reception and legacy ==
Professional ratings
Aggregate scores
| Source | Rating |
|---|---|
| Metacritic | 86/100 |
Review scores
| Source | Rating |
| AllMusic | 4.5/5 stars |
| Alternative Press | 3/5 |
| The Independent | 4/5 stars |
| Mojo | 4/5 stars |
| Pitchfork | 9.1/10 |
| Q | 4/5 stars |
| Spin | B+ |
| Stylus Magazine | A− |
| Tiny Mix Tapes | 5/5 |
| Uncut | 4/5 stars |

At Metacritic, which assigns a weighted average score out of 100 to reviews from mainstream critics, One Word Extinguisher received an average score of 86 out of 100 based on 21 reviews, indicating "universal acclaim".

John Bush of AllMusic called the album "a set of electronica that's nearly as challenging as Autechre's relentlessly academic beat manipulation but just as funky and instantly gratifying as a Fatboy Slim flag-waver." David Morris of PopMatters described it as "meticulously constructed and flawlessly engineered music". Uncut praised the album as a "marvel of hip hop knowledge and glitch science".

In 2017, Pitchfork placed One Word Extinguisher at number 15 on its list of "The 50 Best IDM Albums of All Time". Staff writer Seth Colter Walls wrote: "One Word Extinguisher’s furious pace, and its range of genre references, keeps it from ever becoming boring. This heedless churning of ideas also works as a sonic analogue for a mind in crisis."

== Track listing ==
| No. | Title | Length |
|---|---|---|
| 1. | "The Wrong Side of Reflection (Intro)" | 0:34 |
| 2. | "The End of Biters – International" | 1:17 |
| 3. | "Plastic" (featuring Diverse) | 2:44 |
| 4. | "Uprock and Invigorate" (co-produced by Dabrye) | 3:46 |
| 5. | "The Color of Tempo" | 2:34 |
| 6. | "Dave's Bonus Beats" | 2:10 |
| 7. | "Detchibe" | 4:08 |
| 8. | "Altoid Addiction (Interlude)" | 1:01 |
| 9. | "Busy Signal (Make You Go Bombing Mix)" (co-produced by Daedelus) | 2:41 |
| 10. | "One Word Extinguisher" | 4:04 |
| 11. | "90% of My Mind Is with You" | 3:15 |
| 12. | "Huevos with Jeff and Rani" (featuring Mr. Lif) | 1:22 |
| 13. | "Female Demands" | 2:29 |
| 14. | "Why I Love You" (featuring Jenny Vasquez) | 2:55 |
| 15. | "Southerners (Interlude)" | 0:23 |
| 16. | "Perverted Undertone" | 3:18 |
| 17. | "Invigorate (Interlude)" (co-produced by Dabrye) | 1:25 |
| 18. | "Choking You" | 4:01 |
| 19. | "Storm Returns" (co-produced by Tommy Guerrero) | 5:15 |
| 20. | "Trains on Top of the Game (Interlude)" | 1:54 |
| 21. | "Styles That Fade Away with a Collonade Reprise" | 4:26 |
| 22. | "Esta" (bonus track) | 1:22 |
| 23. | "Pentagram" (bonus track) | 2:59 |

== Charts ==
| Chart (2003) | Peak position |
|---|---|
| US Independent Albums (Billboard) | 41 |
