= Music for a French Elevator and Other Short Format Oddities by the Books =

Compilation album by the Books
- Released: 2006
- Recorded: 2004
- Genres: Collage music, Electronic, Folk
- Length: 15:08; 1:19:00 (online version)
- Label: Self-released

The Books chronology
Lost and Safe (2005)	Music for a French Elevator and Other Short Format Oddities by the Books (2006)	The Way Out (2010)

Professional ratings
Review scores
Source	Rating
Pitchfork Media	(7.2/10)

Music for a French Elevator and Other Short Format Oddities by The Books (often referred to as simply Music for a French Elevator) is a 2006 release by the Books. It is a compendium on mini CD of four pieces created for the "1%" art and sound installation in the Ministry of Culture in Paris, France in 2004. The pieces were created to be played in the elevator of the Ministry, giving the release its title. Following the initial four tracks (those designed for the elevator) are "several 'classic' spoken word tracks" taken from The Books' sample libraries.

This release was distributed on tour in 2006 and is available from The Books online store.

The tracks on this limited release are generally very short. The first four tracks (designed for the aforementioned French elevator) feature many samples of French language phrases.

In August 2013, there were 32 tracks added to the online release, including a cover of Cello Song by Nick Drake, featuring Jose Gonzales.

== Track listing ==
Original release (Music For A French Elevator And Other Short Format Oddities) track listing
No.	Title	Length
1.	"Fralité"	1:18
2.	"Egaberté"	0:53
3.	"Liternité"	1:21
4.	"It's Musiiiiic!"	0:28
5.	"The Joy of Nature"	0:47
6.	"Meditation Outtakes"	1:03
7.	"A Long Villainous Sequence"	0:35
8.	"Millions of Millions"	2:04
9.	"Of the Word God"	1:03
10.	"Ghost train Digest"	2:38
11.	"You'll Never Be Alone"	1:23
12.	"Three Day Night"	1:01
13.	"Ah..., I See"	0:20
Total length:		15:08

Online release (Music For A French Elevator And Other Oddities) track listing
No.	Title	Length
1.	"Fralité"	1:18
2.	"Egaberté"	0:53
3.	"Liternité"	1:21
4.	"It's Musiiiiic!"	0:28
5.	"The Joy of Nature"	0:47
6.	"Meditation Outtakes"	1:03
7.	"A Long Villainous Sequence"	0:35
8.	"Millions of Millions"	2:04
9.	"Of the Word God"	1:03
10.	"Ghost train Digest"	2:38
11.	"You'll Never Be Alone"	1:23
12.	"Ah..., I See"	0:20
13.	"Three Day Night"	1:01
14.	"Classy Penguin"	4:33
15.	"8 Frame"	5:46
16.	"Smack My Bishop"	0:40
17.	"Biospheric Quiet"	1:43
18.	"Happy Lawyers"	1:30
19.	"Hericlitus"	2:15
20.	"John's Arp"	1:41
21.	"Foreign Country and Western"	2:48
22.	"Dustbowl"	3:40
23.	"Biospheric Doubletime"	1:47
24.	"Drowned But Survived"	3:14
25.	"Pickup Dark"	1:41
26.	"Hermetic"	0:53
27.	"Circle of Fifths Loop"	0:37
28.	"Past Comes Welling Up"	3:02
29.	"Electro Lawyers"	1:30
30.	"Mars, OK"	2:22
31.	"Biospheric Dark"	1:11
32.	"Flythrough"	1:52
33.	"Running Down"	0:29
34.	"8 Tons of Oxygen"	1:05
35.	"10,000 Crows"	0:35
36.	"John's Epiphany"	2:48
37.	"Lawyer Lullaby"	1:57
38.	"Hokie Ranch"	1:07
39.	"2over3 Lawyers"	1:45
40.	"Glass Glass"	1:22
41.	"Biospheric Zither"	1:06
42.	"Found Frozen Corndog"	2:28
43.	"Cello Song Feat. Jose Gonzales"	3:54
44.	"Epilogue"	2:31
45.	"Pig"	0:23
Total length:		1:19:00
