= Lady Parts (album) =

Studio album by Fudge
- Released: September 9, 2016
- Genre: Hip-hop
- Length: 37:58
- Label: Lex
- Producer: Guillermo Scott Herren

Singles from Lady Parts
- 1. "In My Shoes" Released: June 29, 2016

Lady Parts is the debut studio album by Fudge, a collaborative project between American record producer Prefuse 73 and American rapper Michael Christmas. It was released on September 9, 2016, through Lex Records. It received generally favorable reviews from critics.

== Background ==
Fudge was formed by record producer Prefuse 73 and rapper Michael Christmas. Lady Parts is the duo's debut studio album. The album's recording took place at Nick Hook's studio in Brooklyn, New York, in the summer and autumn of 2015. Michael Christmas wrote the lyrics to the music Prefuse 73 brought on his hard drive. D.R.A.M. provided guest vocals on the song "All Points South". The artwork is designed by Todd James.

Prefuse 73 later released an instrumental version of the album, titled Fudge Beats, in 2019.

== Critical reception ==
Professional ratings
Aggregate scores
Source	Rating
Metacritic	74/100
Review scores
Source	Rating
AllMusic	3.5/5 stars
Clash	7/10
HipHopDX	4.0/5
Pitchfork	6.8/10

According to the review aggregator Metacritic, Lady Parts received "generally favorable reviews" based on a weighted average score of 74 out of 100 from 7 critic scores.

Sheldon Pearce of Pitchfork stated, "Even without great chemistry, they make a handful of entertaining songs that thrive on sheer amusement." He added, "Despite its faults and flaws, it mostly scans as two talented musicians just having a good time." Paul Simpson of AllMusic commented that "Everything here is exquisitely detailed and busy, but not necessarily in a hurry to get anywhere." He described Lady Parts as "a fun, slightly chaotic album that captures the creative spirit of golden age rap, updated for the damaged attention span of a generation raised on social media." Gary Suarez of The Quietus stated, "The fractured fairy tales of their full-length debut Lady Parts will assuredly satisfy both those old Prefuse 73 fans and newer listeners who enjoy a sensible amount of weirdness in their mixes."

== Track listing ==
All tracks are written by Guillermo Scott Herren and Michael Lindsey.

Lady Parts track listing
No.	Title	Length
1.	"Crash"	1:34
2.	"Young Vet"	3:27
3.	"Circuit Breaker"	1:48
4.	"In My Shoes" (featuring Alex Mali)	3:27
5.	"Kids Kill"	3:04
6.	"These Saturdays" (featuring Pervana)	3:06
7.	"All Points South" (featuring D.R.A.M.)	3:17
8.	"Popstar Shit"	2:35
9.	"Every Off Key Interlude"	1:48
10.	"Showstopper" (featuring Haasan Barclay)	2:39
11.	"I Think Imma"	2:56
12.	"Japanese Mall"	1:50
13.	"Nothing Good"	2:08
14.	"No Vibes"	1:00
15.	"I Got the Good"	3:16
Total length:		37:58

== Personnel ==
Credits adapted from liner notes.

- Guillermo Scott Herren – production
- Michael Lindsey – vocals
- Alex Mali – vocals (4)
- Pervana – vocals (6)
- D.R.A.M. – vocals (7)
- Haasan Barclay – vocals (10)
- Nick Hook – engineering
- Gabriel Schuman – engineering
- Heba Kadry – mastering
- Todd James – artwork
