= Zammuto (album) =

Studio album by Zammuto
- Released: April 3, 2012
- Recorded: May–December 2011
- Genre: Experimental, electronic
- Length: 42:38
- Label: Temporary Residence Limited

Professional ratings
Aggregate scores
Source	Rating
AnyDecentMusic?	7.5/10
Metacritic	76/100
Review scores
Source	Rating
The 405	8/10
AllMusic	3/5 stars
Beats Per Minute	75%
Magnet	4/5 stars
musicOMH	3.5/5 stars
Paste	8.1/10
Pitchfork	8/10
PopMatters	7/10 stars
Spin	8/10
Under the Radar	6/10 stars

Zammuto is an album by The Books member Nick Zammuto, released on April 3, 2012. It is his first release from Zammuto after ending The Books project in early 2012.

In March, he released "Too Late to Topologize" as a free download on his SoundCloud page. The album is also streaming in full on his website.

== Track listing ==
1. "Yay" - 3:39
2. "Groan Man, Don't Cry" - 6:01
3. "Idiom Wind" - 3:56
4. "Crabbing" - 0:37
5. "F U C-3PO" - 3:30
6. "Too Late to Topologize" - 3:38
7. "Zebra Butt" - 3:56
8. "Weird Ceiling" - 3:39
9. "Harlequin" - 5:49
10. "The Shape of Things to Come" - 4:32
11. "Full Fading" - 3:21
