= The Lemon of Pink =

Studio album by the Books
- Released: October 7, 2003
- Genre: Folktronica; post-rock; ambient; musique concrète
- Length: 37:20
- Label: Tomlab

The Books chronology
Thought for Food (2002)	The Lemon of Pink (2003)	Lost and Safe (2005)

Alternative cover
- 2011 reissue

The Lemon of Pink is the second studio album by American musical duo the Books. It was released on October 7, 2003 by Tomlab. Like much of the duo's work, the songs on The Lemon of Pink juxtapose samples with folk and string instrumentation and other melodic elements, including guest vocals by Anne Doerner.

== Critical reception ==
Professional ratings
Aggregate scores
Source	Rating
Metacritic	86/100
Review scores
Source	Rating
AllMusic	4/5 stars
Alternative Press	5/5
Pitchfork	8.4/10
Q	3/5 stars
Stylus Magazine	7.9/10
Tiny Mix Tapes	5/5
Tom Hull – on the Web	B+

The initial critical response to The Lemon of Pink was very positive. At Metacritic, which assigns a normalized rating out of 100 to reviews from professional publications, the album received an average score of 86, based on nine reviews. "It isn't often that one finds an American artist with such a mastery of collage technique and a desire to incorporate traditional folk instruments and melodies", wrote AllMusic critic Daphne Carr, who added that the Books "open up territory for relaxed electro-acoustic listening without compromising their creative process." Alternative Press hailed The Lemon of Pink as "the rare sort of album that convinces you original music still exists." Mark Richardson of Pitchfork found that several of the album's songs "are even better" than those on The Books' debut Thought for Food, "with more dynamic range and a greater sense of development." He concluded that The Lemon of Pink "may sound a bit like" Thought for Food, "but it also sounds like nobody else."

Andy Battaglia of The A.V. Club said that while "some of the exposed-seam splicing sounds sloppy and/or twee", the Books "wield a solid musical hand over melodic figures that hint at swooning grandeur without falling prey to florid temptation." The Village Voice's Robert Christgau gave the album a three-star honorable mention rating, indicating "an enjoyable effort consumers attuned to its overriding aesthetic or individual vision may well treasure", and summarized it as "ambient musique concrète out of acoustic instruments, fractured song structures, and talky voices".

At the end of 2003, Pitchfork ranked The Lemon of Pink as the year's second best album. The record was later included at number 20 on Pitchfork's list of the top 100 albums of 2000 to 2004.

=== Legacy ===
In a 20th anniversary review, Sadie Sartini Garner of Stereogum deemed Lemon one of the United States' "most comforting, confounding, and heartwarming pieces of experimental music". She called it "a staggering technical achievement" that kept its "humble, small, heartwarming, [and] charmingly handmade" feel in the years since its release.

== Track listing ==
All music is composed by The Books (Paul de Jong and Nick Zammuto).

No.	Title	Length
1.	"The Lemon of Pink" (titled "The Lemon of Pink I" on reissues)	4:40
2.	"The Lemon of Pink" (titled "The Lemon of Pink II" on reissues)	1:34
3.	"Tokyo"	3:43
4.	"Bonanza"	0:52
5.	"S Is for Evrysing"	3:32
6.	"Explanation Mark"	0:19
7.	"There Is No There"	3:36
8.	"Take Time"	3:36
9.	"Don't Even Sing About It"	4:09
10.	"The Future, Wouldn't That Be Nice?"	3:15
11.	"A True Story of a Story of True Love"	4:25
12.	"That Right Ain't Shit"	2:44
13.	"PS"	0:55
Total length:		37:20

== Personnel ==
Credits are adapted from the liner notes of the 2003 and 2011 issues of the album.

The Books

- Paul de Jong – music, mastering, mixing
- Nick Zammuto – music, mastering, mixing

Additional personnel

- Anne Doerner – vocals (uncredited)
- Frieda Luczak – cover design
