= Diverse (rapper) =

American rapper

- Born: Kenny Jenkins
- Origin: Chicago, Illinois, U.S.
- Genre: Underground hip-hop
- Occupation: Rapper
- Years active: 2001–present
- Label: Chocolate Industries
- Website: Diverse

Kenny Jenkins, better known by his stage name Diverse, is an American rapper from Chicago. He released the EP Move in 2001 and the debut album One A.M. in 2003. He has collaborated with artists including Mos Def, Prefuse 73, and RJD2.

== Career ==
Diverse got his start in the Chicago hip-hop scene while being employed at a post office.

He has worked or associated with Chicago hip-hop mainstays such as J.U.I.C.E., Modill, and Iomos Marad. His debut EP, Move, featuring the track "Time", appeared in 2001. He has professional relationships with RJD2 and Prefuse 73. He contributed to Prefuse 73's album One Word Extinguisher, rhyming on the track "Plastic". Prefuse 73 also produced the original beat for "Wylin' Out," a track that paired Diverse with the beloved New York City rapper Mos Def. The single "Wylin' Out" was well-received, with remixes by Definitive Jux's RJD2 and K-Kruz, and included on the 2002 Urban Renewal Program compilation. Both Prefuse 73 and RJD2 contributed tracks to Diverse's 2003 debut full-length, One A.M. Prefuse 73's contributions were the ambient-flavored beats for "Jus Biz", "Leaving", and the interlude "Amberglis".

Two of Diverse's songs from his One A.M. album, "Blindman", produced by K-Kruz, and "Explosive (Caural Mix)," were featured on the soundtrack of Capcom's 2006 game Final Fight: Streetwise for the PlayStation 2 and the Xbox. Also featured on the soundtrack was "Wylin' Out (RJD2 Remix)" with Mos Def. The song "Certified" was also featured in Tony Hawk's Underground 2. In the same year, Diverse was featured on the track "Gray Scale" by Montreal-area DJ Ghislain Poirier.

In 2005, Diverse teamed with a Detroit-based crew called Lawless Element, appearing on a track called "...Something."

Summer 2006 saw Diverse participate in The Storm Tour, travelling across North America with headliner Aceyalone, Ugly Duckling, Mayday! and Wrekonize. Diverse's setlist drew heavily from the still unreleased album and mixtape. In June 2006, Diverse was featured on the Chocolate Swim EP, a collaboration of Chocolate Industries and Cartoon Network's Adult Swim. On the six-track EP, Diverse appeared on a Kut Masta Kurt remix of "Wylin' Out" with Mos Def and a DJ Mitsu The Beats remix of his song "Ain't Right".

Diverse announced a second album called Round About, with reported contributions from Madlib, K-Kruz, and Prefuse 73 and also involvement from Oh No, Sa-Ra Creative Partners, Hezekiah, and the late J Dilla. As of 2013, the album had not been released.

In October 2008, Diverse released the single "Escape Earth (The Moon)" on Chocolate Industries. The track was produced by Derrick "Drop" Braxton.

== Style and influences ==
Diverse cites Mos Def, Pharaohe Monch of Organized Konfusion, and Posdnuos of De La Soul as his three main influences.

== Discography ==
=== Studio albums ===
- One A.M. (2003)

=== Mixtapes ===
- Standards (2007)

=== EPs ===
- Move (2001)

=== Singles ===
- "Certified" b/w "Build" (2002)
- "Wylin Out" (2002) with Mos Def and Prefuse 73
- "Explosive" (2003)
- "Jus Biz" (2004)
- "Big Game" (2004)
- "Escape Earth (The Moon)" (2008)

=== Guest appearances ===
- Prefuse 73 - "Plastic" from One Word Extinguisher (2003)

=== Compilation appearances ===
- "Wylin Out (Kut Masta Kurt Remix)" on Chocolate Swim (2006)
