= Nuno Canavarro =

Portuguese composer

Nuno Canavarro (born 15 November 1962) is a Portuguese composer. He studied architecture in Porto. He learned to play piano at a very young age and was in a band called the Street Kids. He also played with the Portuguese band Delfins, and with Carlos Maria Trindade (Madredeus, Heróis do Mar). He is also responsible for the 1988 experimental music recording Plux Quba. This record was a strong influence on the sound of many postmodern electronic musicians, including Mouse on Mars and Jim O'Rourke. O'Rourke re-released Plux Quba on his own Moikai label in 1999.

Nuno Canavarro has also composed music for Portuguese films including Fintar o Destino, O Gotejar da Luz (Light Drops), 14 de Fevereiro (a 1 de Abril), "O Jogo da Glória" and Janelas Verdes. Canavarro produced a DVD about his father's experience in the Portuguese war and composed original music for the DVD Elefante Dundum (2007). He also directed a 2008 movie called Casa da Montanha.

== Discography ==
- Plux Quba (1988, Ama Romanta)
- Mr. Wollogallu (split with Carlos Maria Trindade) (1990, PolyGram/União Lisboa)

== Filmography ==
- Casa da Montanha (2008, David & Golias)
- Estrada de Nada (2015, David & Golias)

== See also ==
- Nuno Canavarro at IMDb
- Nuno Canavarro on MusicBrainz
