= Prefuse 73 =

American music producer

Scott Herren
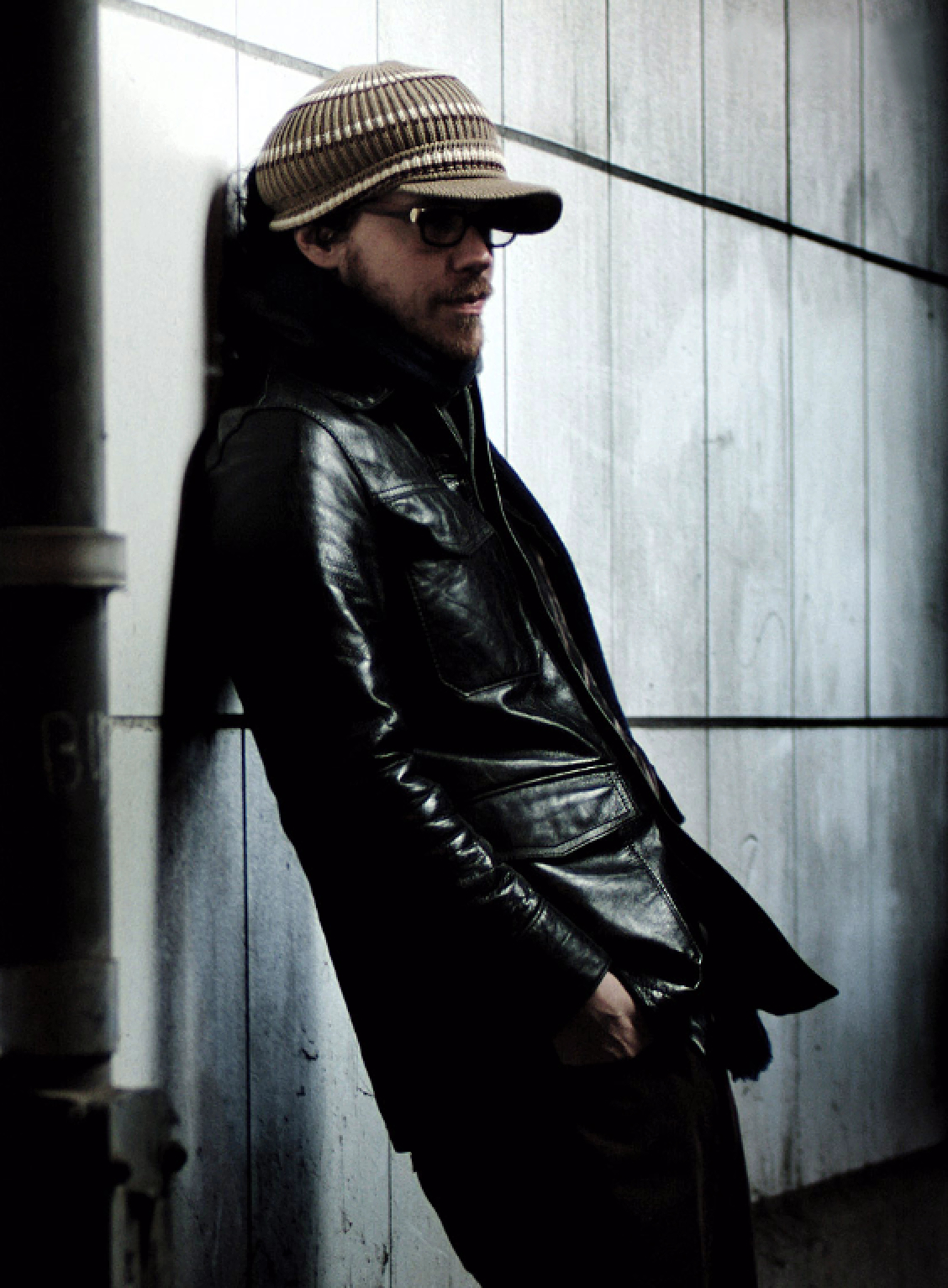
- Herren in 2005

Background information
- Also known as: Prefuse 73; Savath and Savalas; Delarosa & Asora; Piano Overlord; Ahmad Szabo
- Born: Guillermo Scott Herren; Miami, Florida, U.S.
- Origin: Atlanta, Georgia, U.S.
- Genres: Alternative hip-hop; neo-psychedelia; trip hop; electroacoustic; ambient
- Occupations: Producer; DJ
- Years active: 1997–present
- Labels: Warp; Chocolate Industries; Hefty; Money Studies; Pearineel; Schematic; Beat; Lex; Fudge; MF Doom; Aesop Rock
- Website: Official website

Guillermo Scott Herren is an American producer who has been based in Atlanta, Barcelona, and New York City. Herren releases music under the aliases Prefuse 73, Delarosa & Asora, Ahmad Szabo, and Piano Overlord, and is also part of the groups Savath y Savalas, Sons of the Morning, Fudge, Risil, and Diamond Watch Wrists.

== Biography ==
Guillermo Scott Herren was born in Miami, Florida, and grew up in Atlanta, Georgia. His father is Catalan and his mother is Irish and Cuban. At an early age his parents encouraged him to play piano and other instruments; his mother "forced" Herren to play a wide variety of instruments, even going so far as to teach him the Suzuki Method in order to "keep him out of trouble". Growing up, Herren's musical tastes branched out and he became interested in hip-hop, punk rock, and electronic music.

He began his career DJing at MJQ, a small night club in Atlanta, and then began working in commercial studios producing hip-hop tracks for Dirty South rappers. However, Herren wanted to create his own music and started collecting second-hand instruments and drum machines during this part of his career. He eventually moved to New York City to go to college; there he began recording his first major release, Sleep Method Suite, under the name of Delarosa and Asora. The album was released in 1997.

In 2000, Herren released the album Folk Songs for Trains, Trees, and Honey under the name Savath & Savalas.

Herren first released music under the name Prefuse 73 with 2001's commercially and critically successful Vocal Studies + Uprock Narratives. A year later, a 4-track EP The '92 vs. '02 Collection was released. In 2003, Herren released the album One Word Extinguisher, one of his best known Prefuse 73 albums to date. A companion album, Extinguished: Outtakes was released afterwards showing off some of the production "outtakes" and remixes that were omitted from the initial release.

2005 saw the release of Surrounded by Silence, Herren's third album as Prefuse 73. The album featured more collaborations with a variety of musicians, including rappers both underground and mainstream. Herren's next Prefuse 73 release, Security Screenings, was released in 2006; though as long as a full-length, the release was touted as an EP. On August 8, 2007, the fourth Prefuse 73 album, Preparations was announced and it was released on October 15, 2007. The album is sold with a bonus full-length disc titled Interregnums, featuring songs that were more ambient and contemplative than usual Prefuse 73 material.

Along with partners Peter Rentz, Carolina Chaves, Ben Loiz, Carlos Niño, and Paz Ochs, Herren started the Eastern Developments Music label.

In June 2008, Herren announced the formation of a new collaborative project, Risil, which includes members of Sunn O))), Hella, School of Seven Bells, Pivot, and others. On June 24, 2009, the supergroup released their debut LP, entitled Non Meters Volume 1. Herren also released a new Savath & Savalas album, entitled La Llama, earlier in March of the same year, and a new Prefuse 73 LP entitled Everything She Touched Turned Ampexian.

In 2009, under the name Diamond Watch Wrists, he and Zach Hill contributed a cover of a Pivot song to the Warp20 (Recreated) compilation. The group later released the album Ice Capped At Both Ends.

Herren released three sets under the name Prefuse 73 in 2015: two EPs (Forsyth Gardens and Every Color of Darkness) and an album, Rivington Não Rio.

== Discography ==
=== Prefuse 73 ===
Studio albums

- Vocal Studies + Uprock Narratives (2001)
- One Word Extinguisher (2003)
- Surrounded by Silence (2005)
- Preparations (2007)
- Everything She Touched Turned Ampexian (2009)
- Meditation Upon Meditations (The Japanese Diaries) (2009)
- The Only She Chapters (2011)
- Rivington Não Rio (2015)
- Sacrifices (2018)
- Fudge Beats (2019)
- The Failing Institute of the Contras (2020)
- The Failing Institute of the Sampled Source (2020)
- The Failing Institute of Drums & Other Percussion (2021)
- New Strategies for Modern Crime Vol.1 (2024)
- New Strategies for Modern Crime Vol.2 (2024)

Compilation albums

- Extinguished: Outtakes (2003)
- T5 Soul Sessions, Volume 1 (2004)
- Security Screenings (2006)
- Interregnums (2007)

EPs

- Estrocaro EP (2000)
- The '92 vs. '02 Collection (2002)
- Prefuse 73 Reads the Books E.P. (2005)
- The Class of 73 Bells (2007)
- The Forest of Oversensitivity (2009)
- The Flaming Lips with Prefuse 73 (2011)
- Forsyth Gardens (2015)
- Every Color of Darkness (2015)
- Every Off Key Beat (2019)

Singles

- "Radio Attack" b/w "Nuno" (2000)
- "Wylin Out" (2002)
- "HideYaFace" (2005)
- "Forever Chase (Scene One)" (2023)

=== Delarosa & Asora ===
Albums

- Sleep Method Suite (1997)
- Agony, Pt. 1 (2001)

EPs

- Crush the Sight-Seers (1999)
- Backsome (2001)

=== Savath and Savalas ===
Albums

- Folk Songs for Trains, Trees and Honey (2000)
- Apropa't (2004)
- Golden Pollen (2007)
- La Llama (2009)

EPs

- Immediate Action #1 (2001)
- Rolls and Waves (2002)
- Mañana (2005)

=== Piano Overlord ===
Albums

- The Singles Collection 03-05 (2005)
- Aninha Mission (2012)

EPs

- Tease EP (2004)
- Torture EP (2005)

=== Diamond Watch Wrists ===
Albums

- Ice Capped at Both Ends (2009)

=== Guillermo Scott Herren ===
Albums

- Sleeping on Saturday and Sunday Afternoons (2003)

=== Ahmad Szabo ===
Albums

- This Book Is About Words (2003)
- Luck Has a Million Meanings (2006)

=== Sons of the Morning ===
EPs

- Speak Soon, Vol. 1 (2013)

=== Fudge ===
==== Albums ====
- Lady Parts (2016)

=== Reto A Ichi ===
- The Lapse of the Exchange / Alone Moving Often (2018)

=== Productions ===
- Ko-Wreck Technique - "Behavior (Prefuse 73 Mix)" from Ko-Wrecktion Remixes (2000)
- Push Button Objects - "360 Degrees (Prefuse 73 Remix)" from 360 Degrees Remixes (2001)
- Daedelus - "Busy Signal (Prefuse 73 Remix)" from The Household EP (2003)
- Via Tania - "I Dream Again" and "Lightning & Thunder" from Under a Different Sky (2003)
- Erlend Øye - "Every Party Has a Winner and a Loser" from Unrest (2003)
- Amon Tobin - "Verbal (Prefuse 73 Dipped Escalade Mix)" from Verbal Remixes & Collaborations (2003)
- Diverse - "Jus Biz" and "Leaving" from One A.M. (2003)
- Pedro - "Fear & Resilience (Prefuse 73 Remix)" from Fear & Resilience (2004)
- Beans - "Mutescreamer (Prefuse 73 Remix)" from Now Soon Someday (2004)
- Busdriver - "Happiness('s Unit of Measure) (Prefuse 73 Remix)" from Fear of a Black Tangent (2005)
- Daedelus - "Welcome Home" from Exquisite Corpse (2005)
- Nobody - "Tori Oshi" from And Everything Else... (2005)
- TV on the Radio - "Dancing Choose (Prefuse 73 Remix)" from Dancing Choose (2009)
- Anomie Belle - "Lovers (Prefuse 73 Remix)" from Flux (2018)

=== Compilation appearances ===
- "Mizrab" on Impulsive! Revolutionary Jazz Reworked (2005)
