= Lost and Safe =

Studio album by the Books
- Released: April 5, 2005
- Studios: The Books' homes (North Adams, Massachusetts and New York, New York)
- Genres: Folktronica; post-rock
- Length: 41:59
- Label: Tomlab

The Books chronology
| The Lemon of Pink (2003) | Lost and Safe (2005) | Music for a French Elevator and Other Short Format Oddities by the Books (2006) |

Alternative cover
- 2011 reissue

Lost and Safe is the third studio album by American musical duo the Books. It was released on April 5, 2005 by Tomlab. As with the duo's prior records, Lost and Safe features extensive sampling.

== Composition ==
Lost and Safe is stylistically similar to previous Books albums, continuing the duo's rich use of samples. The samples used on Lost and Safe originate from sources as diverse as Raymond Baxter ("That's the picture. You s—you see it for yourself."), W. H. Auden ("This great society is going smash / A culture is no better than its woods", from his poem "Woods"), and a reading of Lewis Carroll's poem "Jabberwocky". "Venice" samples the bonus track of a 1966 opera record, on which an American reporter describes a Salvador Dalí "happening" in Venice. The eclecticism of the samples is partially owed to their origins in used "bargain bin" records. Throughout the album, these direct samples are juxtaposed with interpolated vocal passages performed by Books member Nick Zammuto. The Books opted to employ more linear song structures on Lost and Safe, with the intent of composing material more well suited to live performance.

== Critical reception ==
Professional ratings
Aggregate scores
| Source | Rating |
|---|---|
| Metacritic | 84/100 |
Review scores
| Source | Rating |
| AllMusic | 4.5/5 stars |
| The Boston Phoenix | 3/4 stars |
| DIY | 3.5/5 stars |
| The Observer | 3/5 stars |
| Pitchfork | 7.0/10 |
| Q | 3.5/5 stars |
| Tom Hull' | B+ |
| Uncut | 6/10 |
| URB | 4.5/5 stars |
| The Village Voice | A− |

Lost and Safe received highly positive reviews from music critics. On the review aggregation website Metacritic, the album has a rating of 84 out of 100, indicating "universal acclaim". David Serra of AllMusic wrote: "From the songwriting to the production to the performance, the whole package that the Books present with Lost and Safe works wonderfully and makes for a very rewarding listen." The Wire named Lost and Safe the best album of 2005.

== Track listing ==
All tracks are written by The Books (Paul de Jong and Nick Zammuto).

| No. | Title | Length |
|---|---|---|
| 1. | "A Little Longing Goes Away" | 3:30 |
| 2. | "Be Good to Them Always" | 4:51 |
| 3. | "Vogt dig for Kloppervok" | 3:54 |
| 4. | "Smells Like Content" | 3:41 |
| 5. | "It Never Changes to Stop" | 4:01 |
| 6. | "An Animated Description of Mr. Maps." | 4:38 |
| 7. | "Venice" | 1:42 |
| 8. | "None but Shining Hours" | 2:42 |
| 9. | "If Not Now, Whenever" | 3:35 |
| 10. | "An Owl with Knees" | 4:41 |
| 11. | "Twelve Fold Chain" | 4:44 |
| Total length: | | 41:59 |

== Personnel ==
Credits are adapted from the liner notes of the 2005 and 2011 issues of the album.

The Books

- Paul de Jong – music, mastering, mixing, recording
- Nick Zammuto – music, mastering, mixing, recording

Additional personnel

- Frieda Luczak – design
