= The Only She Chapters =

Studio album by Prefuse 73
- Released: April 25, 2011
- Label: Warp
- Producer: Guillermo S. Herren

Prefuse 73 chronology
The Forest of Oversensitivity (2009)	The Only She Chapters (2011)	The Flaming Lips with Prefuse 73 (2011)

The Only She Chapters is a 2011 studio album by Guillermo Scott Herren under his alias of Prefuse 73.

== Production ==
The Only She Chapters includes various female guest vocalists. These include Trish Keenan of Broadcast, Shara Worden of My Brightest Diamond, Zola Jesus, Nico Turner, and Angel Deradoorian of Dirty Projectors.

== Release ==
The Only She Chapters was released by Warp on April 25, 2011. After the release of The Only She Chapters, his eighth album for Warp, the label informed Herren that it would not be releasing any more of his work, ending his relationship with the label. Exclaim! stated that the release of The Only She Chapters alienated a large portion of Herren's fanbase. Herren stated that the album was him wanting to do something different and that he went through a stage in his career where he wanted to do something completely different, and that on "looking back at it, I should have just done it under a different name [laughs]. It really didn't make much sense now that I think about it, it's like 'Damn, I easily could've called this something else and let be its own thing,' because I feel like I unintentionally alienated a lot of my fans that just wanted to hear what I normally do as Prefuse. That, for me, is my biggest regret about it. It's not that I regret the music, I just should have catalogued it differently."

== Reception ==
Professional ratings
Aggregate scores
Source	Rating
Metacritic	68/100
Review scores
Source	Rating
AllMusic	3/5 stars
The A.V. Club	B
Clash	5/10
Pitchfork	6.4/10

At Metacritic, which assigns a normalised rating out of 100 to reviews from mainstream critics, the album has received an average score of 68, interpreted as "generally favourable", based on 16 reviews.

== Track listing ==
All tracks are written by Guillermo S. Herren except where otherwise noted

No.	Title	Writer(s)	Length
1.	"The Only Recollection of Where Life Stopped"
2.	"The Only Valentine's Day Failure"
3.	"The Only Contact She's Willing to Give" (featuring Faidherbe)	Guillermo S. Herren, Clémence Fichard
4.	"The Only Chamber Resolve"
5.	"The Only Hand to Hold" (featuring Shara Worden)	Herren, Shara Worden
6.	"The Only Thief to Steal Tonality"
7.	"The Only Trial of 9000 Suns" (featuring Trish Keenan)	Herren, Trish Keenan
8.	"The Only Way to Find" (featuring Nico Turner)	Herren, Turner
9.	"The Only Test to Score"
10.	"The Only Boogie Down" (featuring Niki Randa)	Herren, Nicole A. Randa
11.	"The Only Direction in Concrete" (featuring Zola Jesus)	Herren, Nika Roza Danilova
12.	"The Only Recollection of How Things Change" (featuring Faidherbe)
13.	"The Only Guitar to Die Alone" (featuring Adron)	Herren, Adrienne McCann
14.	"The Only Serenidad"
15.	"The Only Lillies and Lilacs"
16.	"The Only Lillies And Lilacs Pt. 2" (featuring Faidherbe)	Herren, Fichard
17.	"The Only Repeat"	Herren, Angel Deradoorian
18.	"The Only Recycled Intro"

== Personnel ==
Credits adapted from The Only She Chapters liner notes.

- Guillermo Scott Herren – producer
- Alejandra Deheza – vocals on track 14
- Claudia Deheza – vocals on track 14
- Benjamin Curtis – guitar on track 14
- Roberto Carlos Lange – producer on track 14
- Angel Deradoorian – vocals on track 17
- Yuko Michishita – illustration
