= Surrounded by Silence (album) =

Studio album by Prefuse 73
- Released: March 21, 2005
- Genres: Electronica, hip-hop
- Length: 60:48
- Label: Warp
- Producer: Prefuse 73

Prefuse 73 chronology
Extinguished: Outtakes (2003)	Surrounded by Silence (2005)	Prefuse 73 Reads the Books E.P. (2005)

Singles from Surrounded by Silence
- 1. "Hide Ya Face" Released: 2005

Professional ratings
Aggregate scores
Source	Rating
Metacritic	73/100
Review scores
Source	Rating
AllMusic	3.5/5 stars
Drowned in Sound	6/10
Exclaim!	favorable
Pitchfork	6.8/10
PopMatters	6/10 stars
Robert Christgau	(choice cut)
Stylus Magazine	B−
Tiny Mix Tapes	4.5/5 marks
XLR8R	favorable

Surrounded by Silence is the third studio album by Prefuse 73. It was released on Warp on March 21, 2005.

== Critical reception ==
At Metacritic, which assigns a weighted average score out of 100 to reviews from mainstream critics, Surrounded by Silence received an average score of 73% based on 21 reviews, indicating "generally favorable reviews".

John Bush of AllMusic gave the album 3.5 stars out of 5, calling it "just another underground rap record, with the usual collection of untraceable sound detritus to anchor its productions."

== Track listing ==
No.	Title	Length
1.	"I've Said All I Need to Say About Them Intro"	3:33
2.	"Hide Ya Face" (featuring Ghostface and El-P)	3:13
3.	"Bad Memory Interlude One"	0:39
4.	"Ty Versus Detchibe" (featuring Tyondai Braxton)	3:21
5.	"Expressing Views Is Obviously Illegal"	3:41
6.	"Pastel Assassins" (featuring Claudia Deheza and Alejandra Deheza)	4:26
7.	"Pagina Dos" (featuring The Books)	2:28
8.	"Silencio Interlude"	0:56
9.	"Now You're Leaving" (featuring Camu)	2:38
10.	"Gratis" (Prefuse vs. Pedro)	4:51
11.	"We Go Our Own Way" (featuring Kazu)	3:19
12.	"Mantra Two" (featuring Tyondai Braxton)	1:06
13.	"Sabbatical with Options" (featuring Aesop Rock)	2:44
14.	"It's Crowded" (featuring Claudia Deheza)	4:53
15.	"Just the Thought" (featuring Masta Killa and GZA)	3:37
16.	"La Correcion Exchange" (featuring DJ Nobody)	4:15
17.	"Hide Ya Face (Reminder Version)"	1:34
18.	"Morale Crusher" (featuring Beans)	1:13
19.	"Minutes Away Without You"	3:48
20.	"Rain Edit Interlude"	1:36
21.	"And I'm Gone" (Prefuse vs. Piano Overlord vs. Broadcast vs. Café Tacuba)	2:55

== Charts ==
Chart	Peak position
US Top Dance/Electronic Albums (Billboard)	8
US Heatseekers Albums (Billboard)	34
US Independent Albums (Billboard)	39
