= Run the Jewels discography =

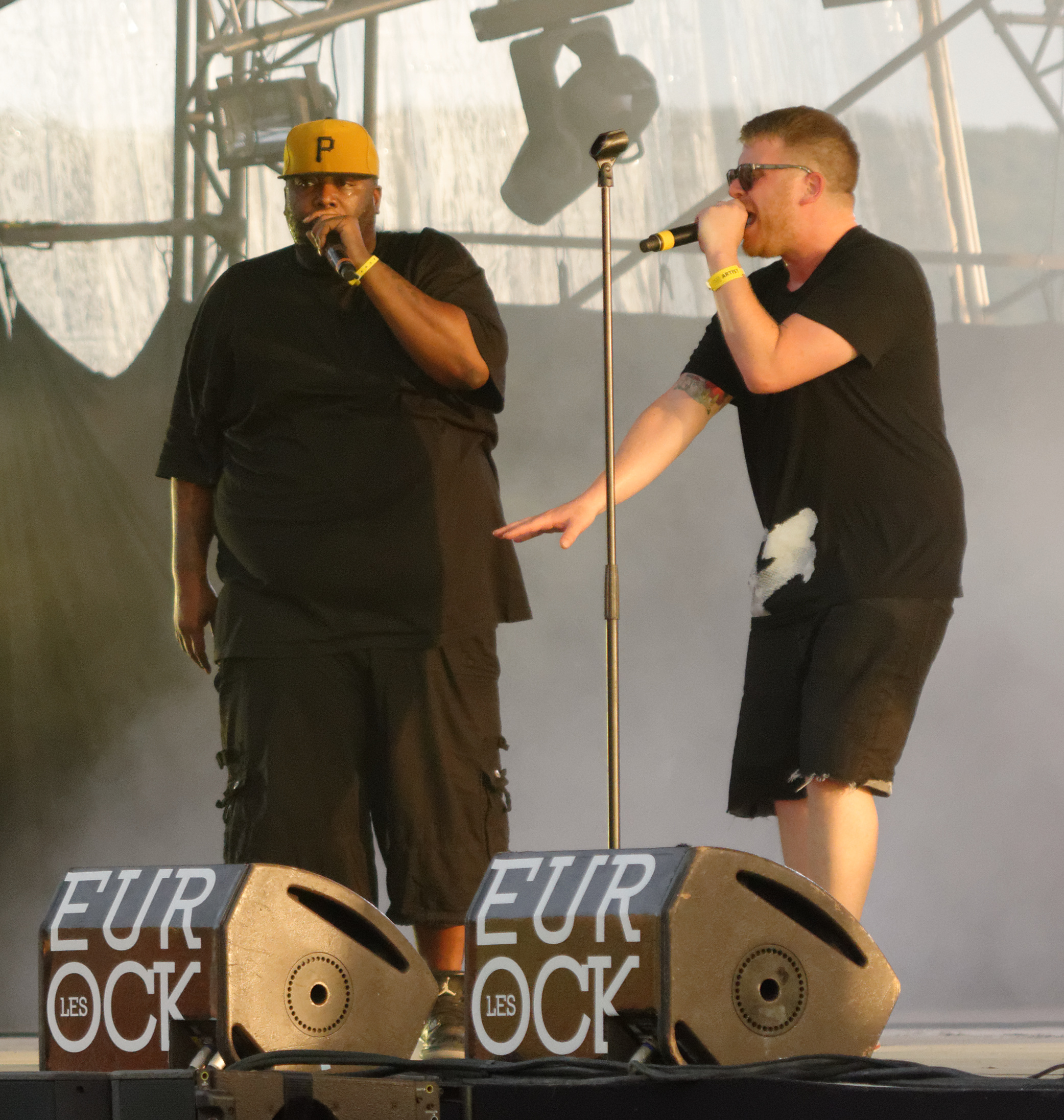
- Run the Jewels performing in 2015
- Studio albums: 4
- EPs: 2
- Remix albums: 2
- Singles: 17
- Music videos: 28

The discography of American hip hop duo Run the Jewels consists of four studio albums, two remix albums and fifteen singles.

Their debut studio album Run the Jewels charted on Billboard charts such as Top R&B/Hip-Hop Albums and Top Rap Albums while their sophomore studio album appeared on the aforementioned charts, the Billboard 200 and the Belgian Ultratop Flanders chart. Their third studio album, which is also their most successful, charted in eight countries including the United States, Australia and the United Kingdom. The album was also their first number one on the Billboard hip hop album chart and it peaked in the top 50 in Ireland and the Netherlands, the top 40 in Australia, Belgium, Canada and the United Kingdom, the top 30 in Scotland and the top 15 in the United States.

== Albums ==
=== Studio albums ===
List of albums, with selected chart positions
| Title | Album details | Peak chart positions | | | | | | | | | |
| Title | Album details | US | US R&B/HH | US Rap | AUS | BEL (FL) | CAN | IRL | NED | SCO | UK |
|---|---|---|---|---|---|---|---|---|---|---|---|
| Run the Jewels | Released: June 26, 2013; Label: Fool's Gold; Formats: CD, LP, download | — | 27 | 21 | — | — | — | — | — | — | — |
| Run the Jewels 2 | Released: October 24, 2014; Label: Mass Appeal, RED; Formats: CD, LP, download, cassette | 50 | 9 | 6 | — | 141 | — | — | — | — | 184 |
| Run the Jewels 3 | Released: December 24, 2016; Label: Run the Jewels, Inc.; Formats: CD, LP, download, cassette | 13 | 1 | 1 | 36 | 32 | 34 | 47 | 49 | 24 | 38 |
| RTJ4 | Released: June 3, 2020; Label: Jewel Runners, BMG; Formats: CD, LP, download, cassette | 10 | 7 | 7 | 21 | 18 | 8 | 8 | 52 | 26 | 9 |
"—" denotes a title that did not chart, or was not released in that territory.

=== Remix albums ===
List of remix albums, with year released
| Title | Album details |
|---|---|
| Meow the Jewels | Released: September 25, 2015; Label: Mass Appeal, RED; Formats: LP, download |
| RTJ Cu4tro | Released: November 11, 2022; Label: Jewel Runners, BMG; Formats: CD, LP, download |

== Extended plays ==
List of extended plays
| Title | EP details |
|---|---|
| Record Store Day | Released: April 18, 2015; Formats: LP |
| RTJ Stay Gold Collectors Box | Released: April 21, 2018; Formats: Box set |

== Singles ==
=== As lead artist ===
| Title | Year | Certifications | Album |
|---|---|---|---|
| "Get It" | 2013 | | Run the Jewels |
| "Banana Clipper" | 2013 | | Run the Jewels |
| "36" Chain" (Note: "36" Chain" was released as a downloadable single, as part of the Adult Swim Singles Program 2013.) | 2013 | | Run the Jewels |
| "Blockbuster Night, Pt. 1" | 2014 | | Run the Jewels 2 |
| "Oh My Darling Don't Cry" (Note: "Oh My Darling Don't Cry" was originally released as a downloadable single, as part of the Adult Swim Singles Program 2014.) | 2014 | | Run the Jewels 2 |
| "Close Your Eyes (And Count to Fuck)" (featuring Zack de la Rocha) | 2014 | RIAA: Gold | Run the Jewels 2 |
| "Rubble Kings Theme (Dynamite)" (Note: "Rubble Kings Theme (Dynamite)" was originally released as a downloadable single, as part of the 2015 Adult Swim Singles Program.) | 2015 | | Rubble Kings: The Album |
| "Talk to Me" (Note: "Talk to Me" was originally released as a downloadable single, as part of the Adult Swim Singles Program 2016.) | 2016 | | Run the Jewels 3 |
| "2100" (featuring Boots) | 2016 | | Run the Jewels 3 |
| "Legend Has It" | 2016 | RIAA: Gold | Run the Jewels 3 |
| "Mean Demeanor" | 2017 | | FIFA 18 (soundtrack) |
| "Let’s Go (The Royal We)" | 2018 | | Venom (soundtrack) |
| "Yankee and the Brave (Ep. 4)" | 2020 | | RTJ4 |
| "Ooh La La" (featuring DJ Premier and Greg Nice) | 2020 | | RTJ4 |
| "JU$T"(featuring Pharrell Williams and Zack de la Rocha) | 2020 | | RTJ4 |
| "No Save Point" | 2020 | | Cyberpunk 2077 (soundtrack) |
| "Opening Theme (from "Aqua Teen Forever: Plantasm")" | 2022 | | Aqua Teen Forever: Plantasm |

=== As featured artist ===
| Title | Year | Peak chart positions | | Album |
| Title | Year | US Alt. | NZ Heat. | Album |
|---|---|---|---|---|
| "Heart Is Full" (Remix) (Miike Snow featuring Run the Jewels) | 2016 | — | — | III |
| "Nobody Speak" (DJ Shadow featuring Run the Jewels) | 2016 | 33 | — | The Mountain Will Fall |
| "Chase Me" (Danger Mouse featuring Run the Jewels and Big Boi) | 2017 | — | — | Baby Driver (soundtrack) |
| "Put Jewels on It" (Statik Selektah featuring Run the Jewels) | 2017 | — | — | 8 |
| "Supercut" (El-P Remix) (Lorde featuring Run the Jewels) | 2018 | — | 9 | Non-album single |
| "3 Tearz" (Danny Brown featuring Run the Jewels) | 2019 | — | — | uknowhatimsayin¿ |
| "Kings & Queens" (DJ Shadow featuring Run the Jewels) | 2019 | — | — | Our Pathetic Age |
| "Forever" (Travis Barker featuring Run the Jewels) | 2020 | — | — | Non-album single |
| "Strangers" (Danger Mouse and Black Thought featuring A$AP Rocky and Run the Jewels) | 2022 | — | — | Cheat Codes |

== Guest appearances ==
List of non-single guest appearances, with other performing artists, showing year released and album name
| Title | Year | Album |
|---|---|---|
| "Don't Trip" (Flosstradamus featuring Run the Jewels and Sizzy Rocket) | 2015 | Soundclash |
| "Revolution Indifference" (Until the Ribbon Breaks featuring Run the Jewels) | 2015 | A Lesson Unlearnt |
| "Born to Shine" (Big Grams featuring Run the Jewels) | 2015 | Big Grams |
| "Delete Delete" (Boots featuring Run the Jewels and Cristin Milioti) | 2018 | #DARKDAZE |
| "Myself" (Bun B featuring Run the Jewels) | 2018 | Return of the Trill |
| "Switches on Everything" (Westside Gunn featuring Run the Jewels and Stove God Cooks) | 2022 | 10 |

== Music videos ==
=== As lead artist ===
| Year | Album | Title | Director(s) | Ref(s) |
|---|---|---|---|---|
| 2013 | Run The Jewels 1 | "36" Chain" | Timothy Saccenti | |
| 2013 | Run The Jewels 1 | "Get It" | | |
| 2013 | Run The Jewels 1 | "Banana Clipper" | | |
| 2013 | Run The Jewels 1 | "A Christmas Fucking Miracle" | Joey Garfield | |
| 2014 | Run The Jewels 1 | "Run the Jewels" | RUFFMERCY | |
| 2014 | Run The Jewels 2 | "Blockbuster Night Part 1" | Trevor Kane | |
| 2014 | Run The Jewels 2 | "Oh My Darling Don't Cry" | Timothy Saccenti | |
| 2015 | Run The Jewels 2 | "Lie, Cheat, Steal" | RUFFMERCY | |
| 2015 | Run The Jewels 2 | "Close Your Eyes (And Count to Fuck)" | A.G. ROJAS | |
| 2015 | Run The Jewels 2 | "Early" | Bug & Sluzzy | |
| 2015 | Run The Jewels 2 | "Angel Duster" | Ryosuke Tanzawa | |
| 2015 | Meow The Jewels | "Oh My Darling (Don't Meow)" (Just Blaze remix) | Ryosuke Tanzawa | |
| 2015 | Rubble Kings : The Album | "Rubble Kings Theme (Dynamite)" | Shan Nicholson | |
| 2016 | Meow the Jewels | "Meowpurrdy" (El-P remix) | Cyriak | |
| 2016 | Run The Jewels 3 | "Crown" | Peter Martin | |
| 2017 | Run The Jewels 3 | "Love Again (Akinyele Back)" | Ninian Doff | |
| 2017 | Run The Jewels 3 | "Legend Has It" | Brian Beletic | |
| 2017 | Run The Jewels 3 | "Down" | Ryo Tanzawa | |
| 2017 | Run The Jewels 3 | "Don't Get Captured" | Chris Hopewell | |
| 2017 | Run The Jewels 3 | "Call Ticketron" | Brad & Brian Palmer | |
| 2018 | Run The Jewels 3 | "Oh Mama" | Juan Meza-León | |
| 2020 | Run The Jewels 4 | "Ooh La La" | Brian & Vanessa Beletic | |
| 2020 | Run The Jewels 4 | "JU$T" | Winston Hacking | |
| 2020 | Run The Jewels 4 | "Out of Sight" | Ninian Doff | |
| 2020 | Run The Jewels 4 | "Yankee and the Brave (ep. 4)" | Sean Solomon | |
| 2020 | Cyberpunk 2077 | "No Save Point" | Mike Diva | |
| 2020 | Run The Jewels 4 | "Walking in the Snow" | Chris Hopewell | |
| 2021 | Run The Jewels 4 | "Never Look Back" | John Hillcoat | |

=== As featured artist ===
| Title | Year | Performer(s) | Director(s) | Ref(s) |
|---|---|---|---|---|
| "Revolution Indifference" | 2014 | Until the Ribbon Breaks | Peter Lawrie Winfield & Storme Whitby Grubb | |
| "Born to Shine / Run for Your Life" | 2016 | Big Grams | Awesome Inc. | |
| "Nobody Speak" | 2016 | DJ Shadow | Sam Pilling | |
| "Chase Me (featuring Big Boi)" | 2017 | Danger Mouse | Andrew Donoho | |
| "3 Tearz" | 2020 | Danny Brown | Colin Read | |
| "Strangers" | 2022 | Black Thought & Danger Mouse, A$AP Rocky | Uncanny | |
