= A Lesson Unlearnt =

Studio album by Until the Ribbon Breaks
- Released: January 20, 2015
- Genre: Alternative rock
- Length: 39:08
- Label: Kobalt Label Services
- Producers: Andy Thomas; James Gordon; Pete Lawrie Winfield; Rollo Armstrong

Until the Ribbon Breaks chronology
A Lesson Unlearnt (2015)	Until the Ribbon Breaks (2018)

A Lesson Unlearnt is the debut studio album by British rock band Until the Ribbon Breaks. It was released on January 20, 2015 via Kobalt Label Services. Produced by Andy Thomas, James Gordon, Pete Lawrie Winfield and Rollo Armstrong, it features guest appearances from Homeboy Sandman and Run the Jewels.

== Critical reception ==
Professional ratings
Aggregate scores
Source	Rating
Metacritic	69/100
Review scores
Source	Rating
Clash	8/10
Exclaim!	8/10
Flood Magazine	4/10
Spectrum Culture	3.75/5 stars
The Line of Best Fit	8/10
Uncut	6/10

A Lesson Unlearnt was met with generally favorable reviews from music critics. At Metacritic, which assigns a normalized rating out of 100 to reviews from mainstream publications, the album received an average score of 69 based on five reviews.

Lauren Bridgeman of Clash praised the album, stating: "each track possesses its own surge of mind movement propelled by the depth of eclectic sonics, psyche and contemporary wording". Mackenzie Herd of Exclaim! wrote: "on A Lesson Unlearnt, the insights on love are articulated both from the position of the one being sought and the one seeking affection, offering an entry point for anyone who can identify with love's effects". George Meixner of The Line of Best Fit concluded: "the variety of genres synthesised to generate this finished record show that they have absorbed life's lessons and reconstituted them to suit a unique outlook. The effect is a strangely familiar, yet singularly arranged thread of consciousness".

In his mixed review for Uncut, Stephen Dalton stated: "while Winfield's pompous lyrics and over-earnest tone sometimes grate, the supple disco-funk of "Sparks" shows definite promise".

== Track listing ==
No.	Title	Writer(s)	Producer(s)	Length
1.	"The Other Ones"	Peter Lawrie Winfield	Pete Lawrie; Rollo Armstrong; James Gordon; Andy Thomas	1:09
2.	"Orca"	Winfield; James Gordon	Pete Lawrie; James Gordon	4:13
3.	"A Taste of Silver"	Winfield	Pete Lawrie; Rollo Armstrong; James Gordon (co.); Andy Thomas (co.)	3:02
4.	"Romeo"	Winfield	Pete Lawrie; Rollo Armstrong; James Gordon (co.); Andy Thomas (co.)	4:18
5.	"Perspective" (featuring Homeboy Sandman)	Winfield; Angel Del Villar	Pete Lawrie; Rollo Armstrong; James Gordon (co.); Andy Thomas (co.)	3:20
6.	"Spark"	Winfield	Pete Lawrie; Rollo Armstrong; James Gordon (co.); Andy Thomas (co.)	3:30
7.	"Revolution Indifference" (featuring Run the Jewels)	Winfield; Jaime Meline; Michael Render; Gordon	Pete Lawrie; James Gordon; Andy Thomas	3:09
8.	"Persia"	Winfield; Gordon	Pete Lawrie; James Gordon; Andy Thomas	3:33
9.	"Pressure"	Winfield	Pete Lawrie; Rollo Armstrong; James Gordon (co.); Andy Thomas (co.)	4:08
10.	"Goldfish"	Winfield	Pete Lawrie; Rollo Armstrong; James Gordon; Andy Thomas	4:20
11.	"Until the Ribbon Breaks"	Winfield	Pete Lawrie; Rollo Armstrong; James Gordon; Andy Thomas	4:26
Total length:				39:08
