= Meow the Jewels =

Remix album by Run the Jewels
- Released: September 25, 2015
- Length: 42:01
- Label: Mass Appeal; RBC
- Producer: The Alchemist; Blood Diamonds; Boots; Dan the Automator; El-P; Geoff Barrow; Just Blaze; Little Shalimar; Nick Hook; Prince Paul; Zola Jesus

Run the Jewels chronology
Run the Jewels 2 (2014)	Meow the Jewels (2015)	Run the Jewels 3 (2016)

Meow the Jewels is a remix album by American hip hop duo Run the Jewels. It was released on September 25, 2015, by Mass Appeal Records and RBC Records. The album, a remix of the duo's original album Run the Jewels 2, has all instrumentals replaced with sounds of cats.

== Release and promotion ==
Run the Jewels, as part of the original album release, offered a series of absurd "deluxe releases" for large sums of money, parodying indulgent "stretch goals" offered on crowdfunding campaigns on Kickstarter. One of the less expensive of these was the group creating a remix album using cat sounds; a group of fans launched an online campaign to raise the money to pay the group the requested $40,000 to cover costs related to production, promotion and shipping physical copies of the album. The campaign in fact raised over $60,000, which Run the Jewels announced would be donated to charity. Several other record producers announced that they would be contributing to the remixes, including Just Blaze, Prince Paul, The Alchemist, Geoff Barrow, Dan the Automator and Boots, among others.

The album was released for free on September 25, 2015 via online streaming services, while the pre-order for the limited-edition 2xLP was made available on the same day.

== Critical reception ==
Professional ratings
Aggregate scores
Source	Rating
Metacritic	74/100
Review scores
Source	Rating
AllMusic	3/5 stars
The Irish Times	3/5 stars
Pitchfork	7/10
PopMatters	7/10
RapReviews	6.5/10

Meow the Jewels was met with generally positive reviews. At Metacritic, which assigns a normalized rating out of 100 to reviews from professional publications, the album received an average score of 74, based on six reviews.

Neil Z. Yeung of AllMusic said, "Whereas the original Run the Jewels 2 was a perfect soundtrack for a night of mayhem, Meow the Jewels is the comedown after all that rabble-rousing". Randall Roberts of Los Angeles Times said, "Meow the Jewels deliver emotional depth befitting nature's most psychologically elusive creature". Adam Finley of PopMatters said, "Most of the internet's ideas end up in a wet mess on the kitchen floor, but this one, this one sticks".

Ryan Dombal of Pitchfork originally awarded the album a cat emoji, as opposed to the publication's usual rating out of 10, saying "while some tracks unwisely try to replicate the source material's dystopian energy, the best moments come when remixers go blissfully off-script". The score was later revised to a 7/10. Steve "Flash" Juon of RapReviews said, "The amount of enjoyment you take out of this is undoubtedly directly proportional to the amount of money you put into Meow the Jewels".

== Track listing ==
Meow the Jewels track listing
No.	Title	Writer(s)	Remixer(s)	Length
1.	"Meowpurrdy" (featuring Lil Bub, Maceo, Delonte and Snoop Dogg)	Jaime Meline; Michael Render	El-P	3:47
2.	"Oh My Darling Don't Meow"	Meline; Render	Just Blaze	3:47
3.	"Pawfluffer Night"	Meline; Render	Zola Jesus	2:43
4.	"Close Your Eyes and Meow to Fluff"	Meline; Render; Zack de la Rocha	Geoff Barrow	3:50
5.	"All Meow Life"	Meline; Render	Nick Hook	3:08
6.	"Lie, Cheat, Meow"	Meline; Render; Jordan Asher; Torbitt Schwartz	Prince Paul	3:17
7.	"Meowrly"	Meline; Render; Asher	Boots	3:35
8.	"Paw Due Respect"	Meline; Render	Blood Diamonds	3:11
9.	"Snug Again" (featuring Gangsta Boo)	Meline; Render	Little Shalimar	3:57
10.	"Creown"	Meline; Render	The Alchemist	2:45
11.	"Angelsnuggler"	Meline; Render	Dan the Automator	3:54
Total length:				38:34

Bonus track
No.	Title	Writer(s)	Remixer(s)	Length
12.	"Creown"	Meline; Render	3D	4:07
Total length:				42:01

== See also ==
- Cat organ
- The Singing Dogs
- Jingle Cats
