= Jean-Baptiste Weckerlin =

French composer and music publisher

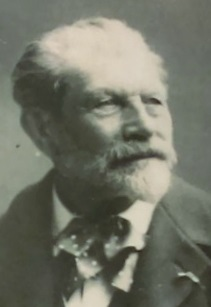
- Jean-Baptiste Weckerlin
- Born: 9 November 1821; Guebwiller, Alsace, France
- Died: 20 May 1910 (aged 88); Guebwiller, now Grand Est, France
- Education: Paris Conservatory
- Occupations: Music publisher; Composer

Théodore Jean-Baptiste Weckerlin or Wekerlin (9 November 1821 – 20 May 1910) was a French composer and music publisher from Alsace.

== Biography ==
Weckerlin was born at Guebwiller. In 1844, he began studying singing with Antoine Ponchard and composition with Fromental Halévy at the Paris Conservatory. In 1847, he published his heroic symphony Roland. In 1853, Weckerlin produced a one-act comic opera, L'Organiste dans l'embarras. In 1869, he was appointed assistant librarian to the Conservatory.

In 1863, he produced his comic opera Die dreifach Hochzeit im Bäsethal, and in 1879 Der verhäxt Herbst. These were both in Alsatian dialect. In 1877, he brought out the one-act opera Après Fontenoy. In 1876, he became Félicien David's successor as librarian at the Conservatory and published in 1885 a biographical catalogue. Later he became librarian of the Société des Compositeurs. He gained great renown as a composer of choral works. He married Marie Damoreau, the daughter of Madame Laure Cinti-Damoreau, the prima donna of Rossini's French operas.

Weckerlin is best remembered for his piano arrangements of traditional French songs, notably the bergerette, a particular kind of pastoral air, originally for voice accompanied by harpsichord, harp or guitar. His major work, Bergerettes, romances et chansons du XVIII siècle, was published in 1860.

It is recorded that he "died in Trottberg" but an obituary on his death in 1910 ran:

Death has taken Jean Baptiste Weckerlin, the "dean of French composers, who passed away at Guebweiler, Alsace, where he was born eighty-nine years ago. He was the composer of a successful opera and has written a number of songs. Weckerlin became librarian at the Conservatory of Paris in succession to Felicien David, and became interested in research work appertaining to the folk-songs of various countries. – Étude

== Works ==
Among his works are:

- Le Jugement dernier, oratorio
- L'Aurore and Paix, charité, grandeur (1866), cantatas
- Les Poèmes de la mer, for soloist, chorus and orchestra (1860)
- L'Inde (1873)
- La Fête d'Alexandre (1873)

=== Writings ===
His Histoire de l'instrumentation depuis le seizième siècle jusqu'à l'époque actuelle won the gold medal of the Académie in 1875. His Musiciana. Extraits d'ouvrages rare ou bizarre [Musiciana. Descriptions of rare or bizarre inventions] describes the cat organ and piganino.

== Selected recordings ==
- Notable recordings of Weckerlin's arrangements were made by the soprano Mady Mesplé for EMI in the 1970s.
- La Laitière de Trianon, performed by Joan Rogers and Yann Beuron; Opera Rara 245.

== Bibliography ==
- Gilman, D. C.; Peck, H. T.; Colby, F. M., eds. (1905). "Weckerlin, Jean Baptiste Théodore" . New International Encyclopedia (1st ed.). New York: Dodd, Mead.
- Sam Morgenstern & Harry Barlow: A Dictionary of Opera and Song Themes (Crown Publishers, 1950)
