= Run the World Tour =

2017 concert tour by Run the Jewels

- Tour by Run the Jewels
- Associated album: Run the Jewels 3
- Start date: January 11, 2017
- End date: November 16, 2017
- Legs: 3
- No. of shows: 44 in North America; 19 in Europe; 63 in total

Run the Jewels concert chronology
- Run the Jewels Tour (2015); Run the World Tour (2017)

The Run the World Tour was a concert tour by the American hip hop duo Run the Jewels, in support of their album Run the Jewels 3 (2016). The tour began on January 11, 2017 in Philadelphia, Pennsylvania and finished on November 16, 2017 in Glasgow, Scotland. Initial shows were announced in North America on November 1, 2016 and thereafter extended to Europe in March 2017.

== Background ==
On November 1, 2016, Run the Jewels announced on social media that they would be going on tour, additionally releasing the dates for the first leg. The tour would be initially going around the United States and Canada at 33 locations, which would begin on January 11, 2017 in Philadelphia, Pennsylvania and end on February 25, 2017 in New York City. The tour was to concur in support with the duo's then-upcoming album Run the Jewels 3, and would feature Cuz Lightyear, The Gaslamp Killer, and Spark Master Tape for the opening acts. General ticket sales for the tour began on November 4, 2016. Extended touring dates were added after the announcement and early during the tour itself.

On January 3, 2017, El-P announced Gangsta Boo and Nick Hook would be joining the tour. On January 11, 2017, the duo announced a spring European tour starting in United Kingdom and ending in Denmark for March, April, and June with tickets going up on January 20. On June 20, 2017, the duo announced additional dates for North America and Europe for October and November, with pre-sale tickets beginning on June 14, 2017. Additionally, Denzel Curry and Cuz Lightyear would be joining the North American dates while Danny Brown would join the European dates. On June 23, 2017, the duo announced extended touring dates for the United Kingdom for November.

== Critical reception ==
Both the North American and European legs of the tour have generally received positive reviews. For the Miami New Times, Angel Melendez reviewing the Miami concert voiced that "The interplay between El-P and Killer Mike is flawless. They weave in and out of each other’s verses and have even perfected a bit of choreography, bouncing and hopping in sync to the rhythm of each other’s words". David Harris of Spectrum Culture commented that although "Run the Jewels is different than most rap music because it keeps it political" keeping away from other topics and "Energy aside, it’s difficult to call the concert a success. When the booming bass and strobing lights undercut the most important thing, the music...". Mark Beaumont of The Guardian rated the duo's performance four out of five stars, expressing "Their cool-cop/goofball-cop act is perfectly, and powerfully, weighted. ... Joking aside, RTJ are the hip-hop clowns becoming politico princes."

== Set list ==
This set list is for the show on January 11, 2017 in Philadelphia, Pennsylvania. It is not representative of all concerts for the duration of the tour.

1. "Talk to Me"
2. "Legend Has It"
3. "Call Ticketron"
4. "Blockbuster Night, Part 1"
5. "Oh My Darling Don't Cry"
6. "Nobody Speak" (DJ Shadow cover)
7. "Hey Kids"
8. "Stay Gold"
9. "Don't Get Captured"
10. "Panther Like a Panther"
11. "Everybody Stay Calm"
12. "Love Again (Akinyele Back)"
13. "Lie, Cheat, Steal"
14. "Early"
15. "A Report to the Shareholders"
16. "Close Your Eyes (And Count to Fuck)"
17. "Down"

Encore

1. "Kill Your Masters"
2. "Run the Jewels"

== Shows ==
List of concerts, showing date, city, country, venue, opening act, tickets sold, number of available tickets and amount of gross revenue
Date	City	Country	Venue	Opening act	Attendance	Revenue
North America
January 11, 2017	Philadelphia	United States	Electric Factory	The Gaslamp Killer; Nick Hook; Gangsta Boo; Cuz Lightyear	—N/a	—N/a
January 13, 2017	Pittsburgh	United States	Stage AE	The Gaslamp Killer; Nick Hook; Gangsta Boo; Cuz Lightyear	2,300 / 2,300	$68,015
January 14, 2017	Cleveland	United States	House of Blues	The Gaslamp Killer; Nick Hook; Gangsta Boo; Cuz Lightyear	—N/a	—N/a
January 16, 2017	Columbus	United States	Express Live	The Gaslamp Killer; Nick Hook; Gangsta Boo; Cuz Lightyear	—N/a	—N/a
January 17, 2017	Nashville	United States	Marathon Music Works	The Gaslamp Killer; Nick Hook; Gangsta Boo; Cuz Lightyear	—N/a	—N/a
January 18, 2017	Norfolk	United States	The NorVA	The Gaslamp Killer; Nick Hook; Gangsta Boo; Cuz Lightyear	—N/a	—N/a
January 19, 2017	Washington D.C.	United States	Echostage	The Gaslamp Killer; Nick Hook; Gangsta Boo; Cuz Lightyear	—N/a	—N/a
January 20, 2017	Raleigh	United States	The Ritz	The Gaslamp Killer; Nick Hook; Gangsta Boo; Cuz Lightyear	—N/a	—N/a
January 21, 2017	Atlanta	United States	The Tabernacle	The Gaslamp Killer; Nick Hook; Gangsta Boo; Cuz Lightyear	—N/a	—N/a
January 23, 2017	Orlando	United States	The Beacham Theatre	The Gaslamp Killer; Nick Hook; Gangsta Boo; Cuz Lightyear	—N/a	—N/a
January 24, 2017	St. Petersburg	United States	Jannus Live	The Gaslamp Killer; Nick Hook; Gangsta Boo; Cuz Lightyear	2,000 / 2,000	$44,860
January 25, 2017	Miami	United States	The Fillmore	The Gaslamp Killer; Nick Hook; Gangsta Boo; Cuz Lightyear	—N/a	—N/a
January 29, 2017	Tempe	United States	Marquee Theatre	The Gaslamp Killer; Nick Hook; Gangsta Boo; Cuz Lightyear	—N/a	—N/a
January 30, 2017	San Diego	United States	The Observatory North Park	The Gaslamp Killer; Nick Hook; Gangsta Boo; Cuz Lightyear	—N/a	—N/a
February 1, 2017	Los Angeles	United States	Shrine Expo Hall	The Gaslamp Killer; Nick Hook; Gangsta Boo; Cuz Lightyear	5,000 / 5,000	$162,107
February 2, 2017	San Jose	United States	City National Civic	The Gaslamp Killer; Nick Hook; Gangsta Boo; Cuz Lightyear	—N/a	—N/a
February 3, 2017	Oakland	United States	Fox Theater	The Gaslamp Killer; Nick Hook; Gangsta Boo; Cuz Lightyear	2,828 / 2,828	$102,900
February 5, 2017	Arcata	United States	Van Duzer Theatre	The Gaslamp Killer; Nick Hook; Gangsta Boo; Cuz Lightyear	—N/a	—N/a
February 6, 2017	Portland	United States	Crystal Ballroom	The Gaslamp Killer; Nick Hook; Gangsta Boo; Cuz Lightyear	—N/a	—N/a
February 7, 2017	Seattle	United States	Showbox SoDo	The Gaslamp Killer; Nick Hook; Gangsta Boo; Cuz Lightyear	—N/a	—N/a
February 8, 2017	Vancouver	Canada	PNE Forum	The Gaslamp Killer; Nick Hook; Gangsta Boo; Cuz Lightyear	—N/a	—N/a
February 10, 2017	Salt Lake City	United States	The Complex	The Gaslamp Killer; Nick Hook; Gangsta Boo; Cuz Lightyear	—N/a	—N/a
February 11, 2017	Denver	United States	Fillmore Auditorium	The Gaslamp Killer; Nick Hook; Gangsta Boo; Cuz Lightyear	—N/a	—N/a
February 13, 2017	Kansas City	United States	The Midland	The Gaslamp Killer; Nick Hook; Gangsta Boo; Cuz Lightyear	—N/a	—N/a
February 14, 2017	St. Paul	United States	Myth	The Gaslamp Killer; Nick Hook; Gangsta Boo; Cuz Lightyear	—N/a	—N/a
February 15, 2017	Madison	United States	Orpheum Theater	The Gaslamp Killer; Nick Hook; Gangsta Boo; Cuz Lightyear	—N/a	—N/a
February 17, 2017	Chicago	United States	Aragon Ballroom	The Gaslamp Killer; Nick Hook; Gangsta Boo; Cuz Lightyear	4,793 / 4,793	$136,648
February 18, 2017	Royal Oak	United States	Royal Oak Music Theatre	The Gaslamp Killer; Nick Hook; Gangsta Boo; Cuz Lightyear	—N/a	—N/a
February 19, 2017	Toronto	Canada	Danforth Music Hall	The Gaslamp Killer; Nick Hook; Gangsta Boo; Cuz Lightyear	—N/a	—N/a
February 21, 2017	Montreal	Canada	Metropolis	The Gaslamp Killer; Nick Hook; Gangsta Boo; Cuz Lightyear	—N/a	—N/a
February 22, 2017	Portland	United States	State Theater	The Gaslamp Killer; Nick Hook; Gangsta Boo; Cuz Lightyear	—N/a	—N/a
February 24, 2017	Boston	United States	House of Blues	The Gaslamp Killer; Nick Hook; Gangsta Boo; Cuz Lightyear	—N/a	—N/a
February 25, 2017	New York	United States	Terminal 5	The Gaslamp Killer; Nick Hook; Gangsta Boo; Cuz Lightyear	11,200 / 11,200	$336,030
February 26, 2017	New York	United States	Terminal 5	The Gaslamp Killer; Nick Hook; Gangsta Boo; Cuz Lightyear	11,200 / 11,200	$336,030
February 27, 2017	New York	United States	Terminal 5	The Gaslamp Killer; Nick Hook; Gangsta Boo; Cuz Lightyear	11,200 / 11,200	$336,030
March 1, 2017	New York		Terminal 5		11,200 / 11,200	$336,030
Europe
March 29, 2017	Belfast	United Kingdom	Limelight	The Gaslamp Killer	—N/a	—N/a
March 30, 2017	Dublin	Ireland	Olympia	The Gaslamp Killer	—N/a	—N/a
March 31, 2017	Manchester	United Kingdom	Albert Hall	The Gaslamp Killer	—N/a	—N/a
April 1, 2017	London	United Kingdom	The Roundhouse	The Gaslamp Killer	—N/a	—N/a
April 3, 2017 (Note: The concert on April 3, 2017, in Mayrhofen is part of Snowbombing)	Mayrhofen	Austria	The Racket Club	—N/a	—N/a	—N/a
April 5, 2017	Amsterdam	Netherlands	Melkweg	—N/a	—N/a	—N/a
April 6, 2017	Brussels	Belgium	Ancienne Belgique	The Gaslamp Killer	—N/a	—N/a
April 7, 2017	Paris	France	Élyssée Montmarte	The Gaslamp Killer	—N/a	—N/a
June 2, 2017 (Note: The concert on June 2, 2017, in Barcelona is part of the Primavera Sound 2017)	Barcelona	Spain	Parc del Fòrum	—N/a	—N/a	—N/a
June 9, 2017 (Note: The concert on June 9, 2017, in Aarhus is part of the Northside Festival)	Aarhus	Denmark	Ådalen	—N/a	—N/a	—N/a
North America
October 6, 2017 (Note: The concerts on October 6–8 and October 13–15, 2017, in Austin is part of the Austin City Limits Fest)	Austin	United States	Zilker Park	—N/a	—N/a	—N/a
October 7, 2017	Austin	United States	Zilker Park	—N/a	—N/a	—N/a
October 8, 2017	Austin	United States	Zilker Park	—N/a	—N/a	—N/a
October 10, 2017	Knoxville	United States	Mill & Mine	Denzel Curry; Cuz Lightyear	—N/a	—N/a
October 11, 2017	Asheville	United States	The Orange Peel	Denzel Curry; Cuz Lightyear	—N/a	—N/a
October 13, 2017	New Orleans	United States	The Joy Theater	Denzel Curry; Cuz Lightyear	—N/a	—N/a
October 13, 2017	Austin	United States	Zilker Park	Denzel Curry; Cuz Lightyear	—N/a	—N/a
October 14, 2017	Austin	United States	Zilker Park	Denzel Curry; Cuz Lightyear	—N/a	—N/a
October 15, 2017	Austin	United States	Zilker Park	Denzel Curry; Cuz Lightyear	—N/a	—N/a
October 18, 2017	Oklahoma City	United States	Diamond Ballroom	Denzel Curry; Cuz Lightyear	—N/a	—N/a
October 20, 2017 (Note: The concerts on October 20–22, 2017, in Phoenix is part of the Lost Lake Fest)	Las Vegas	United States	Brooklyn Bowl	Denzel Curry; Cuz Lightyear	—N/a	—N/a
October 20, 2017	Phoenix	United States	Steele Indian School Park	—N/a	—N/a	—N/a
October 21, 2017 (Note: The concert on October 21, 2017, in Sacramento is part of the Aftershock Festival)	Phoenix	United States	Steele Indian School Park	—N/a	—N/a	—N/a
October 21, 2017	Sacramento	United States	Discovery Park	—N/a	—N/a	—N/a
October 21, 2017	Phoenix	United States	Steele Indian School Park	—N/a	—N/a	—N/a
October 22, 2017	Phoenix	United States	Steele Indian School Park	—N/a	—N/a	—N/a
Europe
October 31, 2017	Stockholm	Sweden	Annexet	Danny Brown	—N/a	—N/a
November 2, 2017	Copenhagen	Denmark	Tap1	Danny Brown	—N/a	—N/a
November 4, 2017 (Note: The concert on November 4, 2017, in Paris is part of the Pitchfork Fest)	Paris	France	Grande halle de la Villette	—N/a	—N/a	—N/a
November 6, 2017	Brussels	Belgium	AB Hall	Danny Brown	—N/a	—N/a
November 7, 2017	Amsterdam	Netherlands	AFAS Live	Danny Brown	—N/a	—N/a
November 9, 2017	Manchester	United Kingdom	Victoria Warehouse	Danny Brown	—N/a	—N/a
November 11, 2017	London	United Kingdom	O2 Brixton Academy	Danny Brown	—N/a	—N/a
November 12, 2017	London	United Kingdom	O2 Brixton Academy	Danny Brown	—N/a	—N/a
November 14, 2017	Birmingham	United Kingdom	O2 Academy Birmingham	Danny Brown	—N/a	—N/a
November 15, 2017	Leeds	United Kingdom	O2 Academy Leeds	Danny Brown	—N/a	—N/a
November 16, 2017	Glasgow	United Kingdom	O2 Academy Glasgow	Danny Brown	—N/a	—N/a
