= Run the World =

Run the World may refer to:

- Run the World (TV series), an American comedy series
- "Run the World (Girls)", a song by Beyoncé, 2011
- "Run the World", a song by Jennifer Lopez from Love?, 2011
- Run the World Tour, a 2017 concert tour by Run the Jewels
