= Run the Jewels 3 =

Studio album by Run the Jewels
- Released: December 24, 2016
- Recorded: January 2015 – September 2016
- Studios: Primary recording: RTJ; Additional recording: Cosmic Zoo; Pulse; The Sound Factory; UTTRB (Los Angeles)
- Genre: Hip-hop
- Length: 51:27
- Labels: Run the Jewels; RBC
- Producer: El-P

Run the Jewels chronology
Meow the Jewels (2015)	Run the Jewels 3 (2016)	RTJ4 (2020)

Singles from Run the Jewels 3
- 1. "Talk to Me" Released: November 4, 2016; 2. "2100" Released: November 11, 2016; 3. "Legend Has It" Released: December 2, 2016

Run the Jewels 3 is the third studio album by American hip-hop duo Run the Jewels, which consists of rappers El-P and Killer Mike. It was self-released through their Run the Jewels, Inc. imprint via RBC Records digitally on December 24, 2016, and physically on January 13, 2017. The album serves as the follow-up to their 2014 album, Run the Jewels 2. It features guest appearances from Danny Brown, Joi, Trina, Boots, Tunde Adebimpe, Zack de la Rocha, and Kamasi Washington. The album was supported by three singles: "Talk to Me", "2100", and "Legend Has It". Similar to Run the Jewels 2, it was released as a free download on their website as well as being physically released on CD and LP.

Much like its predecessors, Run the Jewels 3 received widespread acclaim from critics. It debuted at number 35 on the US Billboard 200, with 23,000 album-equivalent units in its first week, and later peaked at number 13 on the chart.

== Background ==
Run the Jewels 3 was first announced on December 14, 2014. Killer Mike announced that work on the album began in January 2015. On September 27, 2016, El-P confirmed that all of the album had been recorded.

== Artwork ==
In an interview with Spin, Run the Jewels discussed the meaning of the album's cover art:

For us, the RTJ1 hands were about "taking what's yours" – your world, your life, your attitude. The RTJ2 hands were wrapped in bandages, signifying injury and healing, which for us represented the growth in ideas and tone of that album. For RTJ3 the bandages are off, the chain is gone and the hands have been transformed into gold. For us this represents the idea that there is nothing to take that exists outside of yourself. You are the jewel.

== Promotion ==
The album's first single, "Talk to Me", was originally released on October 24, 2016, on Adult Swim's 2016 singles program. It was later released as the lead single of the album on November 4, 2016. The album's second single, "2100", was released on November 11, 2016. It features a guest appearance from American musician Boots. The album's third single, "Legend Has It", was released on December 2, 2016. Excerpts from "Legend Has It" were prominently used in the first teaser trailer for the 2018 Marvel movie Black Panther, which premiered during Game 4 of the 2017 NBA Finals and was viewed 89 million times in 24 hours.

== Critical reception ==
Professional ratings
Aggregate scores
Source	Rating
AnyDecentMusic?	8.5/10
Metacritic	88/100
Review scores
Source	Rating
AllMusic	4/5 stars
The A.V. Club	B+
Chicago Tribune	3.5/4 stars
The Guardian	4/5 stars
The Independent	4/5 stars
NME	5/5 stars
Pitchfork	8.6/10
Q	4/5 stars
Rolling Stone	4/5 stars
Vice	A−

Run the Jewels 3 was met with widespread critical acclaim. At Metacritic, which assigns a normalized rating out of 100 to reviews from mainstream publications, the album received an average score of 88, based on 34 reviews. Aggregator AnyDecentMusic? gave it 8.5 out of 10, based on their assessment of the critical consensus.

In Vice, Robert Christgau said the duo were "funnier, hookier, and kinder as well as brainier and more political" than before, while Chicago Tribune critic Greg Kot called the record "an album that megaphones its restlessness while retaining its wicked sense of fun". Dan Weiss of Consequence said, "So the blessing and the curse of Run the Jewels 3 is that it's still a Run the Jewels album, a promise that every song is good, nothing is bad, and depending on your mood you'll either bask in the lack of tempo changes, pulchritudinous song structures, and surprising hooks, or you'll seek out a more colorful record". Neil Z. Yeung of AllMusic said, "In short, RTJ3 is near perfect in its execution. They're so good at this that it seems almost unfair in its effortlessness". Clayton Purdom of The A.V. Club said, "Three albums deep, Killer Mike and El-P sound as hungry as ever, and the world is still full of Caesars with ripe throats". Paul MacInnes of The Guardian said, "The formula is probably becoming familiar, but its time is now". Roisin O'Connor of The Independent said, "Killer Mike and El-P bring typically sharp, visceral observations, chugging beats and superb guest artists onto their most successful studio effort to date". Joe Madden of NME said, "There's tonnes of fun to be had from absorbing the duo's fury, and El-P's sci-fi beats are as thrillingly big 'n' bad as ever". Sheldon Pearce of Pitchfork said, "It isn't quite as punchy as RTJ2, which was brutish in its tactics, with nonstop bangs and thrills, but RTJ3 is a triumph in its own right that somehow celebrates the success of a seemingly unlikely friendship and mourns the collapse of a nation all at once".

Keith Harris of Rolling Stone said, "Lyrically, there no lack of muscular skill-flexing. ... Run the Jewels can still detonate rhymes like a Molotov cocktail lobbed into a CVS, but now they're strategizing for the long war ahead". Joseph Mathieu of Exclaim! said, "If "bloody", "urgent", "enraged" and "heartening" were enough description to sum up El-P and Killer Mike's latest Run the Jewels album, this review could end here. But they aren't; this late 2016 LP, along with the duo's various collaborative tracks with several DJs and rappers all year, have officially placed RTJ high on the shelf of the "hard to describe" category". Steve "Flash" Juon of RapReviews said, "The irony of releasing three beautiful albums it that even a great album like RTJ3 can still wind up being ranked third in descending order. As good as it is nothing here can top "Crown", "Angel Duster" or "Early" for me. By no means is this in any way a negative. It's like saying you're going to listen to your third favorite Ice Cube or third favorite Michael Jackson album—you're still going to wind up listening to some brilliant shit over and over again no matter what". Scott Glaysher of XXL said, "In the grand scheme of rap music, Killer Mike and El-P get more and more niche with each project they release together and this new album is no different. If this dynamic duo can keep their rebellious spirit alive without beating it to death, they'll continue to thrive". Jesse Cataldo of Slant Magazine said, "The level of discourse on Run the Jewels 3 may be higher than your standard hip-hop grandstanding, and the references may be current and the beats may be more intense, but the album remains too entrenched in the grammar of the past to ever feel entirely fresh".

=== Year-end lists ===
Select year-end rankings of Run the Jewels 3
Publication	List	Rank	Ref.
Exclaim!	Exclaim!'s Top 10 Hip-Hop Albums of 2017	5	
Paste	The 50 Best Albums of 2017	4	
Pitchfork	The 50 Best Albums of 2017	29	
PopMatters	The 60 Best Albums of 2017	33	
Rough Trade	Albums of the Year	22	
The Skinny	The Skinny's Top 50 Albums of 2017	7	
Slant Magazine	The 25 Best Albums of 2017	10	

== Commercial performance ==
Run the Jewels 3 debuted at number 35 on the US Billboard 200, with 23,000 album-equivalent units in its first week. As of January 2017, the album has sold 41,000 copies.

== Track listing ==
All tracks are written by Jaime Meline and Michael Render, except where noted.

Run the Jewels 3 track listing
No.	Title	Writer(s)	Length
1.	"Down" (featuring Joi)		3:29
2.	"Talk to Me"		2:31
3.	"Legend Has It"		3:25
4.	"Call Ticketron"		3:18
5.	"Hey Kids (Bumaye)" (featuring Danny Brown)	Meline; Render; Daniel Sewell	3:11
6.	"Stay Gold"		3:27
7.	"Don't Get Captured"		3:12
8.	"Thieves! (Screamed the Ghost)" (featuring Tunde Adebimpe)	Meline; Render; Jordan Cruz^{[a]}	4:02
9.	"2100" (featuring Boots)	Meline; Render; Cruz	4:01
10.	"Panther Like a Panther (Miracle Mix)" (featuring Trina)		3:41
11.	"Everybody Stay Calm"		2:58
12.	"Oh Mama"		3:36
13.	"Thursday in the Danger Room" (featuring Kamasi Washington)		4:22
14.	"A Report to the Shareholders" / "Kill Your Masters"	Meline; Render; Zack de la Rocha	6:14
Total length:			51:27

Japanese bonus tracks
No.	Title	Length
15.	"Call Ticketron" (instrumental version)	3:18
16.	"Legend Has It" (Toyomu remix)	4:54
Total length:		59:39

Notes

- ^{^[a]} signifies an additional writer
- "Kill Your Masters" features uncredited vocals by Zack de la Rocha

== Personnel ==
Credits adapted from the album's liner notes.

Run the Jewels

- El-P – vocals, producer, engineer, art direction
- Killer Mike – vocals

Musicians

- Trackstar the DJ – scratches (2, 7)
- Michael Marie Render – additional vocals (5)
- Grace Strother – additional vocals (5)
- Gabrielle Strother – additional vocals (5)
- Matt Sweeney – additional guitar (5, 6)
- 'Lil Zoby Poundstone Schwartz – additional drum programming (7)
- Danger Mouse – piano (8)
- Tunde Adebimpe – additional vocals (8)
- Boots – additional vocals (9)
- Mike Bones – additional guitar (11)
- Kamasi Washington – horns (13)
- Nadezhda Tolokonnikova – additional vocals (14)

Technical

- Joey Raia – mixing
- Joe LaPorta – mastering
- Leon "Young Leon" Kelly – audio recording, engineer
- Little Shalimar – co-producer, engineer
- Wilder Zoby – co-producer, engineer
- Johannes Raassina – additional audio recording (1)
- Todd Monfalcone – additional audio recording (8, 13)
- Boots – co-producer (10)
- Daddy Kev – additional recording (14)

Design

- Nick Gazin – artwork
- Troy Hahn – layout design
- Virginia Poundstone – statue production oversight
- Tim Saccenti – art direction, photography, artwork
- Paige Tooker – statue creation

== Charts ==
Chart performance for Run the Jewels 3
Chart (2016–2017)	Peak position
Australian Albums (ARIA)	36
Austrian Albums (Ö3 Austria)	60
Belgian Albums (Ultratop Flanders)	32
Belgian Albums (Ultratop Wallonia)	107
Canadian Albums (Billboard)	34
Dutch Albums (Album Top 100)	49
French Albums (SNEP)	126
German Albums (Offizielle Top 100)	59
Irish Albums (Official Charts)	47
New Zealand Heatseekers Albums (RMNZ)	2
Scottish Albums (Official Charts)	24
UK Albums (Official Charts)	38
US Billboard 200	13
US Top R&B/Hip-Hop Albums (Billboard)	1

== Release history ==
Release dates and formats for Run the Jewels 3
Region	Date	Label(s)	Format(s)	Ref.
Various	December 24, 2016	Run the Jewels, Inc.; RBC	Digital download	
Various	January 13, 2017	Run the Jewels, Inc.; RBC	CD; vinyl	

== See also ==
- Run the World Tour
