= Cat organ =

Conjectural musical instrument

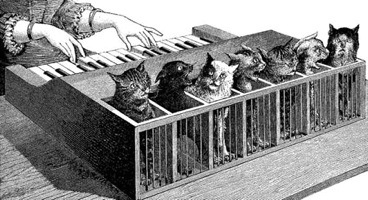
From La Nature, 1883

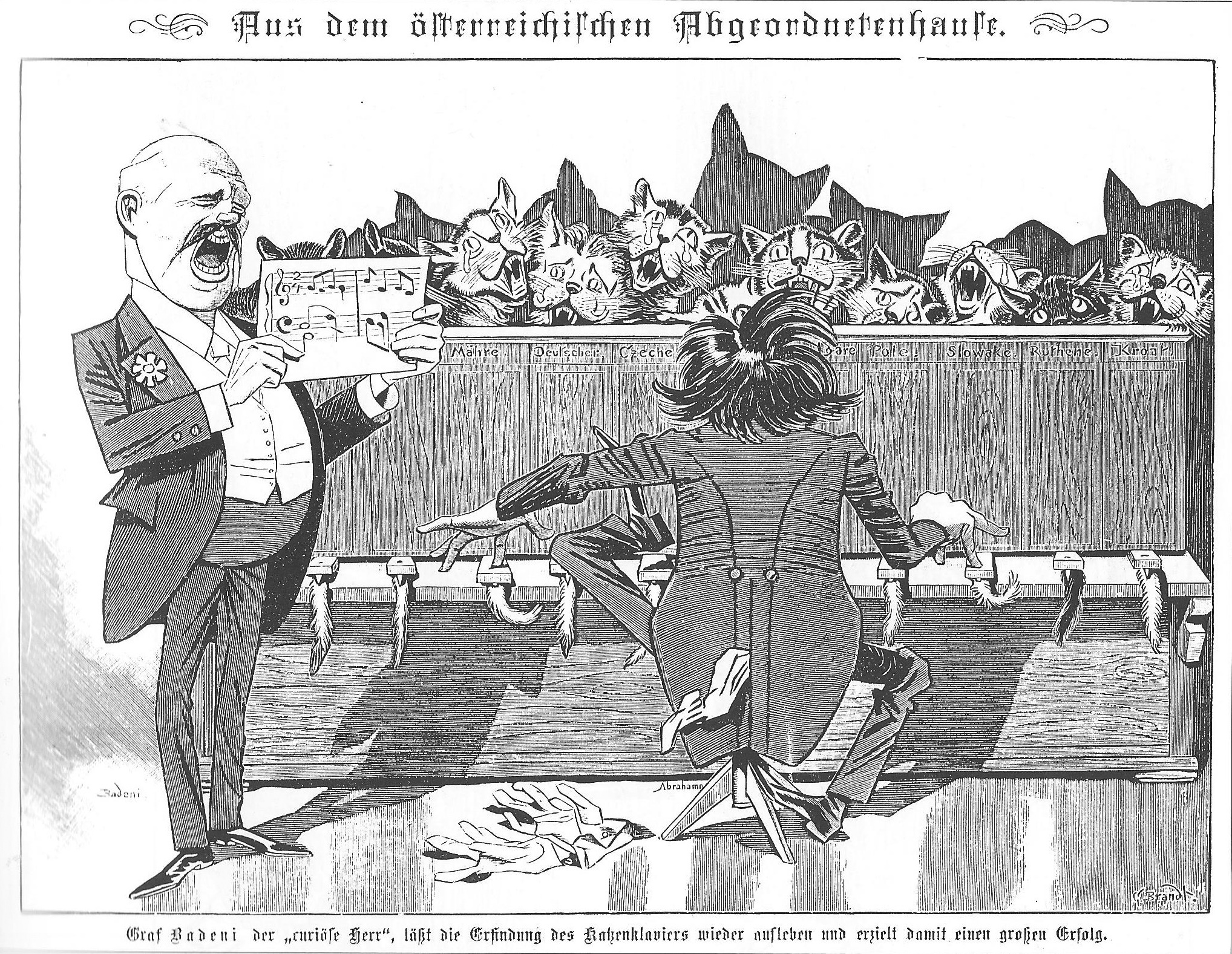
Kladderadatsch (1897) parodies Count Badeni in a caricature of him accompanied by Katzenjammermusik [cat whine music]

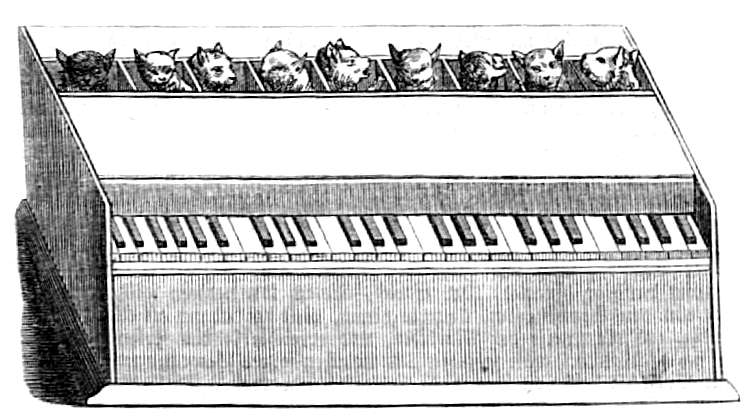
Depiction in 1858 Die Gartenlaube short, "Katzen-Orgel"

A cat organ (German: Katzenorgel; French: Orgue à chats), also called cat piano (German: Katzenklavier; French: piano à chats), is a hypothetical musical instrument which consists of a line of cats fixed in place with their tails stretched out underneath a keyboard so that they cry out when a key is pressed. The cats would be arranged according to the natural tone of their voices.

== Origins ==
There is no official record of a cat organ actually being built; rather it is described in literature as a bizarre concept.

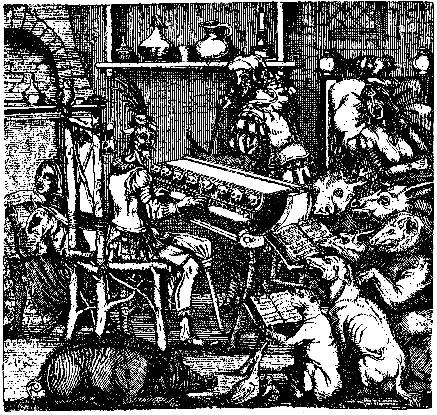
from J-B. Weckerlin, Musiciana (1877)

This supposed instrument was described by the French writer Jean-Baptiste Weckerlin in his 1877 book Musiciana, extraits d'ouvrages rares ou bizarres (Musiciana, descriptions of rare or bizarre inventions):

When the King of Spain Felipe II was in Brussels in 1549 visiting his father the Emperor Charles V, each saw the other rejoicing at the sight of a completely singular procession. At the head marched an enormous bull whose horns were burning, between which there was also a small devil. Behind the bull a young boy sewn into a bear skin rode on a horse whose ears and tail were cut off. Then came the archangel Saint Michael in bright clothing, and carrying a balance in his hand.

The most curious was on a chariot that carried the most singular music that can be imagined. It held a bear that played the organ; instead of pipes, there were sixteen cat heads each with its body confined; the tails were sticking out and were held to be played as the strings on a piano, if a key was pressed on the keyboard, the corresponding tail would be pulled hard, and it would produce each time a lamentable meow. The historian Juan Christoval Calvete, noted the cats were arranged properly to produce a succession of notes from the octave... (chromatically, I think).

This abominable orchestra arranged itself inside a theatre where monkeys, wolves, deer and other animals danced to the sounds of this infernal music.

The instrument was described by German physician Johann Christian Reil (1759–1813) for the purpose of treating patients who had lost the ability to focus their attention. Reil believed that if they were forced to see and listen to this instrument, it would inevitably capture their attention and they would be cured: "A fugue played on this instrument--when the ill person is so placed that he cannot miss the expression on their faces and the play of these animals--must bring Lot's wife herself from her fixed state into conscious awareness."

The instrument was first described by Athanasius Kircher in his 1650 work Musurgia Universalis, though the lack of an image may have left doubt in the minds of some writers. (The New York Times, for example, has carried an article claiming that he described the instrument, and another stating that he did not describe it in Musurgia Universalis.). His description appears in Book 6, Part 4, Chapter 1, under the heading "Corollaria," (emphasis added):

Constructum non ita pridem ad melancholiam magni cuiusdam Principis depellendam abinsigni ingeniosoque Histrione tale quodpiam instrumentum. Feles vivas accepit omnes differentis magnitudinis, quas cistae cuidam huic negotio dedita opera fabricatae ita inclusit ut caudae perforamina extentae, certis quibusdam cana, libus insererentur affixae, hisce subdidit palmulas subtilissimis ac uleis loco malleolorum instructas; Feles vero iuxta differentem magnitudinem tonatim ita disposuit; ut singulae palmulae singulis responderent felium caudis, instrumentumque ad relaxationem Principis praeparatum oportuno loco condidit, quod deinde pulsatum eam harmoniam redditit, qualem Felium voces reddere possunt. Nam palmulae digitis Organoe di depressae aculeis suis dum caudas pungunt cattorum hi in rabiem acti miserabili voce, nunc gravem, modò acutam intonantes, eam ex felium vocibus compositam reddiderunt harmoniam, quae et moveret homines ad risum, et vel sorices ipsos ad saltum concitare posset.

This can be paraphrased as:

This remarkably clever instrument was built not so long ago to try to dispel the melancholy of the prince. Live cats of all sizes where placed in a box built for this purpose, containing sharp points near the tails so that they struck cats of different sizes, producing different pitches when different keys where pressed. The performance of this frenzy of cat voices in harmony, sometimes in misery, sometimes in anger, caused amusement.

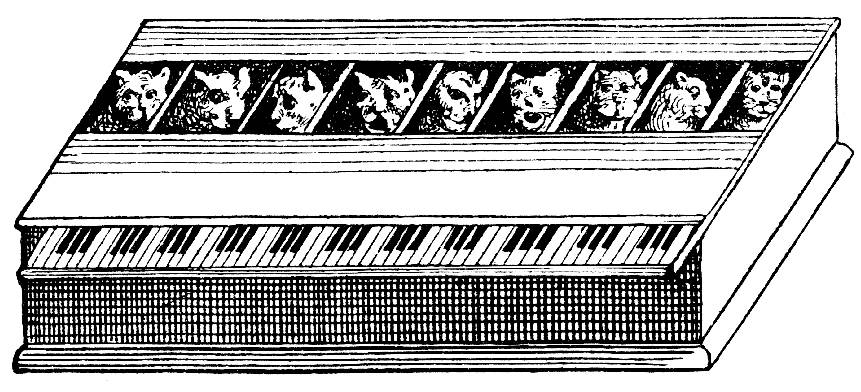
From Gaspar Schott, Magia Naturalis (1657)

The citation is noted by Kircher's student Gaspar Schott in Magia Naturalis naturae et artis, Part 2, Book 6, Pragmatia 2, titled "Felium Musicam exhibere [Cat Concert]."

== Modern citations and reconstructions ==
In Herbet Rosendorfer's short story "The Career of Florenzo Waldweibel-Hostelli" (1970), the ormizellic cat organ (with 72 tied-up cats, arranged according to voice or better meow pitch) is mentioned.

Michael Betancourt compares the sampling of cats' meows used in Jingle Cats' albums, Meowy Christmas (1993) and Here Comes Santa Claws (1994), to the cat organ, in that both require cats, but diminish each performer's importance.

Kircher notes that the instrument can be used to reduce the melancholy of princes by moving them to laughter, almost exactly the situation that occurred in 2010 when the then Prince of Wales was greatly amused by a performance of the tune "Over the Rainbow" on an instrument recreated using squeaky toy cats by Henry Dagg for a garden party held at Clarence House supporting Charles's Start initiative for sustainable living.

Terry Gilliam's 1988 film The Adventures of Baron Munchausen features a scene with a similar organ that uses human prisoners instead of cats.

Monty Python's Flying Circus, season 1 episode 2, features a man playing a mouse organ that relies on a similar scheme.

In season 1 episode 5 or the Rita Moreno episode of The Muppet Show, a character known as Marvin Suggs is introduced. He plays a Muppaphone which uses a similar concept. He comes back multiple times and is now a recurring member of the Muppet cast.

In 2009, the Australian animation studio The People's Republic of Animation, released a short titled The Cat Piano. This work tells the tale of a city of cats whose musicians are kidnapped by a human in order to make a cat piano.

== See also ==
- Piganino — a similar, fictitious instrument using pigs
- Terry Jones – Monty Python's performer on a similar fictional instrument, the mouse organ (Musical Mice sketch)
- Marvin Suggs – a character from The Muppet Show who plays a muppaphone, a collection of puppet characters with differently pitched "ows!" when hit on the head (watch YouTube).
- The Singing Dogs – a series of novelty recordings.
- Donald Barthelme – The character Mr. Peterson, in the story "A shower of gold", is visited by a tall, foreign-looking man with a huge switchblade, who announces himself as the cat-piano player.
- Fatso – better known as Keyboard Cat, a cat that played the piano
- Musashi's – Japanese musical group of cats
