= Musashi's =

- Origin: Japan
- Genre: pop music
- Years active: 2007–present
- Label: Universal Music
- Members: Musashi; Leo; Luca; Seri; Marble

The Musashi's are a musical group in Japan, consisting of five cats owned by musician/songwriter Hideo Saitō. The group is affiliated with Stardust Promotion; the contract with Stardust stated that each cat will be given one skipjack tuna approximately valued at 7000 Japanese yen (US$90.00) per song.

== Members ==
- Musashi (ムサシ) - leader; 4-year-old male Norwegian Forest Cat. Youngest but also the fattest.
- Leo (レオ) - 4-year-old male cat. Quiet crying noise.
- Luca (ルカ) - 6-year-old female cat. Quiet but high crying noise.
- Seri (セリ) - main vocal; 12-year-old female cat.
- Marble (マーブル) - 15-year-old female cat. When the owner picked her up, she was living on the street and in poor health.

== History ==
=== 2007 ===
Toward the end of 2007, Saitō posted a video of the cats on YouTube to celebrate Christmas. In the video, the cats sing to the tune of "Jingle Bells" along with instrumental backup. This video became popular with cat lovers, not only in Japan, but all over the world. The YouTube video had over 1.2 million views by the end of 2007. It was also nominated for a YouTube award in the category of "Best Video of 2007".

=== 2008 ===
In 2008, the Musashi's signed a contract with Stardust Promotion. On March 3, they released their first single covering a popular Japanese song "Hotaru no Hikari". This cover was accompanied by a new original song. The single was a digital download from music.jp. A second single titled "Ichinensei ni Nattara" was released on April 7, 2008.

=== 2015 ===
On September 24, 2015, Seri died at the age of 19. Seri had been battling kidney disease since two years prior. Their blog was opened up to make the announcement.

== Discography ==
=== Singles ===
- 2008-03-03 - Hotaru no Hikari
- 2008-04-07 - Ichinensei ni Nattara

== See also ==
- Cat organ
