= Jingle Cats =

Christmas novelty songs

Cover of the first Jingle Cats album, Meowy Christmas

Jingle Cats (1993) and its follow-up Jingle Dogs are a series of Christmas novelty song albums from producer Mike Spalla. A third series was released in 1997 titled Jingle Babies. Jingle Cats and Jingle Dogs were released as albums and videos. A 1998 video game of Jingle Cats was released in Japan.

== Releases ==
The songs are created by Spalla who mixes actual animal sounds to match tones of the songs. He started with a version of "Jingle Bells" that was released to radio stations a few years before the full album came out. In all, it took more than 1,000 meows, screeches and growls to assemble 20 melodies.

Meowy Christmas was released on CD and cassette in 1993 to wide United States media coverage within its first week. The album reached number 86 on a Billboard chart and was sold out a week before Christmas. The following year, Meowy Christmas was placed on the Billboard top 10 catalog album chart. The second album, Here Comes Santa Claws, was released in 1994 with "3,000 brand new meows and new arrangements". Here Comes Santa Claws starred Spalla's cats Sprocket, Twizzler, Binky, Cheese Puff, Clara, Cueball, Graymer, Max, and Petunia. Spalla played the accordion and the background music was from his dog, Klippy Kloppy. Its success resulted in a national tour and live television appearances. A spin-off series starring Jingle Dogs was released on September 11, 1995, titled Christmas Unleashed. On October 23, 1995, a VHS was released that features the Jingle Cats singing and dancing. Jingle Dogs received a VHS release in 1996 alongside a Jingle Cats VHS. The Jingle Cats album Rhythm and Mews was released in 2002. The Jingle Dogs CD Puppy Holidays was released in 2008. In 2009, the album First Meowel was released on iTunes as well as the official website and starred the cats Messifur, Jumper, Ally, and Christmas Tree Face with dog noises in the background. In 2008, Jingle Cats Christmas was released on DVD with songs from the Jingle Cats and the Jingle Dogs.

== Merchandise ==
A mail order catalog sold Jingle Cats t-shirts, buttons, and stickers. Hallmark Cards signed a four-year contract to sell Jingle Cats singing cards in 2008 and over 125,000 cards sold within the first three months. The song "Jingle Cats Medley" played in the film Fred Claus. A 1998 video game was released for Mac, Windows and the PlayStation in Japan titled Jingle Cats: A cat story of love and friendship: The Love Para Operation Volume (ジングルキャッツ 愛と友情のネコ物語 : ラブパラ大作戦の巻). The player is given the task of taking care of the Jingle Cats by interacting with them in various ways, having to fill up a "love-o-meter" before time runs out. Writing for The Believer, Blake Butler notes that "the object is to breed and care for cats, which begin to sing when they're done copulating". The video game was not released internationally.

== Reception ==
In 1995, Here Comes Santa Claws won a Billie Award from Billboard for point-of-purchase category. David Wharton of the Los Angeles Times said, "Yet for every person who listens to 'Jingle Cats' and hears only screeching, there are cat lovers who hear a symphony."

After following up what Billboard called "excellent" Jingle Cats and Jingle Dogs albums, Spalla produced a Jingle Babies album for which Billboard described the series as having hit a "brick wall". Ashley Naftule of Phoenix New Times reviewed Jingle Cats and said, "Don't be fooled by its kitschy name: A more accurate title for the project would be The Wretched Mewling Of The Damned." Blake Butler wrote a review of the Jingle Babies release Rockabye Christmas in The Believer saying, "I imagine these boggled carols funneled loudly into malls, sending people running from the Gap and Sharper Image back to hide inside their homes, to wrap the roof with enough colored light to keep the dark out, fearing what other kind of man might slide down the chimney."

== In popular culture ==
In the Yogscast's annual "Jingle Jam" charity livestream, the hosts traditionally watch Jingle Cats on YouTube as the first segment every 1 December. Since 2017, they have invited fans to submit their own Jingle Cats videos.

== See also ==
- Cat Organ – Conjectural musical instrument
- Meow the Jewels
- The Singing Dogs
