= Until the Ribbon Breaks =

UK musical group

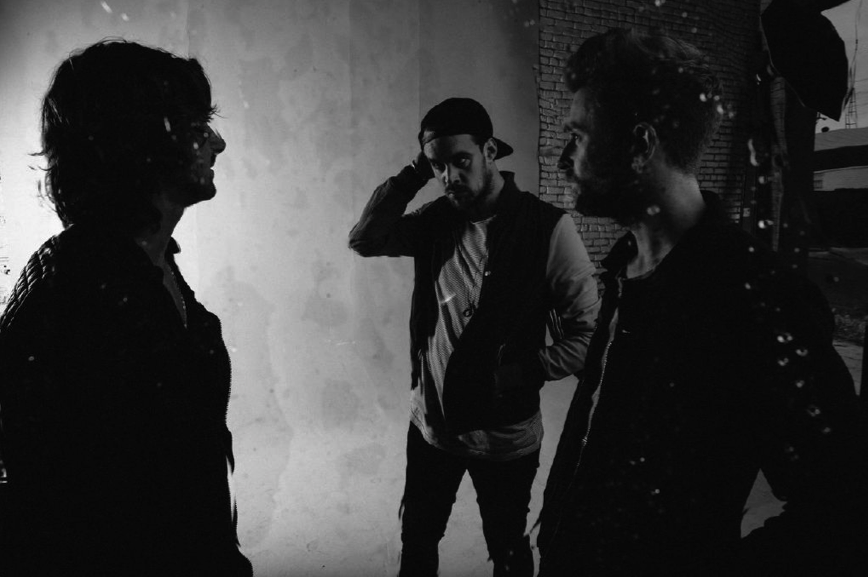

Background information
- Also known as: UTRB
- Origin: Cardiff, Wales
- Genres: Electronic, pop, rock, hip hop, alternative, avant-garde, R&B
- Years active: 2012–present
- Labels: Kobalt Label Services (KLS)
- Members: Peter Lawrie-Winfield; Elliot Wall
- Past members: James Gordon
- Website: www.untiltheribbonbreaks.com

Until the Ribbon Breaks (often abbreviated to UTRB), is a Welsh band consisting of the frontman Pete Lawrie-Winfield (lead vocals, keyboards, programming, percussion, brass, guitar) and Elliot Wall (drums, programming, backing vocals). The band was founded in Cardiff, Wales in 2012, initially as Lawrie-Winfield's solo project and "blends genres like electronic, pop, rock, and hip-hop, but it's all done with a sharp alternative edge".

== History ==
=== 2012: Founding ===
The group began as the solo project of Pete Lawrie Winfield, from Cardiff, Wales. Both his parents were musicians, and Winfield grew up to listening to artists such as Marvin Gaye, Stevie Wonder, and Elton John. Winfield went to school to study film, but found he preferred music after he started making soundtracks for his own movies. He has stated, "Until The Ribbon Breaks started as a concept I had for one record. Ribbon being film or a cassette tape as the whole thing was based around this idea of the combination of music and film. At the time I made it I didn't know how far I was going to go with it."

=== 2013: Early releases ===
Pitchfork Media stated on 20 June 2013, Until the Ribbon Breaks' early single "Pressure" "was written during a period when Winfield was sleeping on the floor of his studio with no concrete plan for his career". For the music video, Winfield combined scenes from David Lynch's 1997 thriller Lost Highway, stating; "Lost Highway seemed like the perfect match visually for the mood I was trying to convey...The film feels willfully claustrophobic and always on the verge of losing any sense of continuity."

External videos
- Phantogram – "Fall In Love" (Until The Ribbon Breaks Re-imagination) (Apr 9, 2014)

With the track "2025", released in June 2013, Pitchfork writes that Winfield "manages to paint a starkly provocative picture of emotional decay, exhaling his vocals with a painfully resigned rasp circled by lurching drum machines, deflating synths, and industrial clanging. '2025' is a beautiful dirge, a bleak track kept barely afloat by an aching, human sadness".

Winfield soon recruited James Gordon and Elliot Wall to join the band. To create their debut album, the band "buried themselves in a hidden studio space armed with just a film projector, a microphone, a drum machine, and a piano". The trio would project films without sound on the studio walls while working, with Winfield stating "I'd shut the sound off, watch the movies, and make music to them. It was everything from David Lynch to Terrence Malick".

The band finished their first tour of North America in 2013, in support of Lorde, and also finished a five-date tour across the United States with Phantogram that year. Spin named the Until The Ribbon Breaks one of the Best 5 Artist of the Month for June 2013. As of 2013, they released remixes of The Weeknd's "Wicked Games," Sam Smith's "Nirvana," and Lorde's "Royals." UTRB was featured on Run the Jewels' "Job Well Done" in 2013.

=== 2014–present: Recent projects ===
In 2014, the band released a remix of "Sights" by London Grammar, in which an accompanying music video was also released, being composed of cut-up clips from films that inspired the re-imagination. Vogue called the remix "a starker, slimmer version of the original that transforms the spirit of it into something slightly more eerie". In June 2014, the band performed at Electric Forest Festival in Michigan. The band opened for London Grammar throughout January 2015, after releasing their debut full-length album, A Lesson Unlearnt, in January 2015.

On 3 November 2015, it was announced through the band's Facebook page that member James Gordon would be leaving the band to focus on new ventures.

On 26 January 2018, the band was featured on a video by the YouTube social experiment channel 'Yes Theory' regarding past alcoholism.

On 23 February 2018, Until the Ribbon Breaks released its second studio album called Until the Ribbon Breaks.

On 21 June 2024, six years after releasing their self titled second album, they released V I S I T O R to all streaming services.

On 10 September 2025, the band released the single Cupid. This was their first project since their last studio album in 2024.

== Style ==
"Pete Lawrie Winfield's small catalog of original songs and remixes is almost uniformly marked by a palpable sense of restlessness and apocalyptic finality."
— Pitchfork Media

The band "blends genres like electronic, pop, rock, and hip-hop, but it's all done with a sharp alternative edge," and Pitchfork Media has called Until the Ribbon Breaks "avant-R&B savants". The band often writes music in front of a projector, with Winfield stating; "For me, it just allows my mind to wander further than the confines of where it normally would. Silent moving images of nature, space, a busy street, whatever it maybe, take on a new sense of gravitas when soundtracked and vice versa. The music is given meaning by the image". Winfield has also stated that, "Lyrics, to me, are the most essential part of writing music. I always start with the music, and depending on how I feel and what mood the music is conveying, that gives me an idea of what kind of thing I should be saying over it".

== Members ==
Current lineup

- Pete Lawrie-Winfield – lead vocals, keys, programming, percussion, brass and guitar (2012–present)
- Elliot Wall – drums, programming, backing vocals (2013–present)

Past members

- James Gordon – keys, percussion, programming, backing vocals, bass (2013–2015)

== Discography ==
=== Albums ===
- A Lesson Unlearnt (2015)
- Until the Ribbon Breaks (2018)
- Visitor (2024)

=== Singles ===
Selected songs by Until the Ribbon Breaks
| Year | Title | Album | Notes |
|---|---|---|---|
| 2013 | "Pressure" | Promo single | Music video |
| 2013 | "2025" | Promo single | Music video |
| 2025 | “Cupid” | – | – |

=== Remixes ===
- "King and Lionheart (Until the Ribbon Breaks Remix)" by Of Monsters and Men
- "Addicted to Love (Until the Ribbon Breaks Remix)" by Robert Palmer
- 2012: "Primadonna (Until the Ribbon Breaks Remix)" by Marina and the Diamonds
- 2012: "Wicked Games (Until the Ribbon Breaks Remix)" by The Weeknd
- 2013: "Nirvana (Until the Ribbon Breaks Remix)" by Sam Smith
- 2013: "Closer (Until the Ribbon Breaks Remix)" by Tegan and Sara
- 2014: "Sights (Until the Ribbon Breaks Remix)"" by London Grammar
- 2014: "Royals (Until the Ribbon Breaks Remix)" by Lorde
- 2014: "Fall in LOVE (Until the Ribbon Breaks Remix)" by Phantogram
- 2014: "She (Until the Ribbon Breaks Remix)" by Laura Mvula

=== Soundtrack appearances ===
- Stalker – Their cover of Blondie's "One Way or Another" appears in the TV show Stalker with a darker and fitting tune for the episode.
- Grey's Anatomy – In season 10 episode 10, their song "Romeo" plays in the dying minutes of the episode.
- The Magicians – In season 3 episode 13, their song "One Way or Another" plays in the last moments of the episode.

=== Guest appearances ===
Selected songs featuring Until the Ribbon Breaks
| Year | Single name | Primary artist(s) | Album | Release details |
|---|---|---|---|---|
| 2013 | "Job Well Done" (ft. Until the Ribbon Breaks) | Run the Jewels | Run the Jewels | Fool's Gold, June 26, 2013 |
| 2016 | "Seam by Seam" (ft. Until the Ribbon Breaks) | Homeboy Sandman | Kindness for Weakness | Stones Throw Records, May 6, 2016 |
