= RTJ4 =

Fourth studio album by Run the Jewels

Studio album by Run the Jewels
- Released: June 3, 2020
- Studios: Chicago Recording (Chicago); Electric Lady (New York City); ProductoMart (New York City); The Space Pit (New York City); Shangri-La (Malibu); Tree Sound (Atlanta)
- Genre: Hip-hop
- Length: 38:57
- Labels: Jewel Runners; BMG
- Producers: El-P; Josh Homme

Run the Jewels chronology
Run the Jewels 3 (2016)	RTJ4 (2020)	RTJ Cuatro (2022)

Singles from RTJ4
- 1. "Yankee and the Brave (Ep. 4)" Released: March 22, 2020; 2. "Ooh La La" Released: March 25, 2020; 3. "Just" Released: June 14, 2020

RTJ4 (Note: An initialism for Run the Jewels 4. Physical releases and some reviews use Run the Jewels 4, but the initialism is used by online databases, streaming services, and record charts.) is the fourth studio album by American hip-hop duo Run the Jewels. It was released digitally through their own Jewel Runners imprint via BMG Rights Management on June 3, 2020, two days earlier than scheduled, with physical editions released in September 2020. As with their previous albums, a download of the album is available for free through their website, with the option of paying for it via other digital providers. The album features guest appearances from Greg Nice, DJ Premier, 2 Chainz, Pharrell Williams, Mavis Staples, Josh Homme, and frequent collaborator Zack de la Rocha.

RTJ4 received widespread acclaim from critics and debuted at number 10 on the US Billboard 200, their first top 10 album on the chart. The album was supported by three singles: "Yankee and the Brave (Ep. 4)", "Ooh La La", and "Just".

== Background and artwork ==
The album was first announced on October 11, 2018, with the release of the non-album single "Let's Go (The Royal We)", which was featured in the 2018 superhero film Venom and debuted on Zane Lowe's Beats 1 show.

In an interview with The Verge, El-P said that for RTJ4's album cover he wanted to turn the Run the Jewels finger gun and fist logo futuristic in a way "that harkens back to some of the most basic shapes", which inspired the low poly artwork. Tim Saccenti said he also worked on design and 3D printed the artwork into a glossy sculpture. He stated that the designers took photographs of it in multiple different colored lightings to reference the color schemes of the duo's previous albums and combined the results for the final cover.

== Promotion and release ==
The album's first single, "Yankee and the Brave (Ep. 4)", was released on March 22, 2020. The album's second single, "Ooh La La" featuring Greg Nice and DJ Premier, was released on March 25, three days later. The music video for "Ooh La La" was released on April 27, 2020.

The original album release date was June 5, 2020. Due to the ongoing protests against police brutality and racism sparked by the murders of George Floyd and Ahmaud Arbery, and the killing of Breonna Taylor, the duo decided to release it two days early. The accompanying note read:

Fuck it, why wait. The world is infested with bullshit so here's something raw to listen to while you deal with it all. We hope it brings you some joy. Stay safe and hopeful out there and thank you for giving 2 friends the chance to be heard and do what they love. With sincere love and gratitude, Jaime + Mike.

In collaboration with "Ooh La La", the duo announced a cannabis strain of the same name. "Just" featuring Pharrell Williams and Zack de la Rocha, was sent to alternative radio as the third single on June 14, 2020.

== Critical reception ==
Professional ratings
Aggregate scores
Source	Rating
AnyDecentMusic?	8.8/10
Metacritic	89/100
Review scores
Source	Rating
AllMusic	4.5/5 stars
And It Don't Stop	A+
Clash	9/10
Exclaim!	9/10
Financial Times	5/5 stars
The Independent	4/5 stars
NME	5/5 stars
Pitchfork	8.3/10
Rolling Stone	4/5 stars
The Times	4/5 stars

RTJ4 was met with widespread critical acclaim. At Metacritic, which assigns a normalized rating out of 100 to reviews from professional publications, the album received an average score of 89, based on 26 reviews. Aggregator AnyDecentMusic? gave it 8.8 out of 10, based on their assessment of the critical consensus.

Will Lavin of NME praised the album, stating, "Easily Mike and El-P's best work to date, RTJ4 is protest music for a new generation; they're armed in the uprising with a torrent of spirited rallying calls". Reviewing the album for Rolling Stone, Jon Dolan stated, "RTJ4, which the band rush-released a few days ahead of schedule, is laser-focused. [...] Mike unloads on racist cops, systemic poverty, corporate media, and other eternal enemies. But the album never feels preachy, because the music bounces as much as it brays, with an elastic flow and deep history". Jack Bray of The Line of Best Fit wrote, "RTJ4 is Killer Mike & El-P's masterstroke. This is musical evolution for moral, social and political revolution, the group now creating anthems in the pursuit of tolerance, respect and unity". Channing Freeman from Sputnikmusic also enjoyed the album, saying, "As is typical on Run the Jewels albums, every feature is perfectly placed, but the inclusion of Mavis Staples and Josh Homme may be El-P's finest production moment yet. Homme's ghostly wailing and questing guitar provide a backdrop for Staples to sing an image that perfectly distills not only RTJ's oeuvre but the bloody centuries of America's history". For Pitchfork, Sheldon Pearce wrote that "RTJ4 centers protest music less explicitly than RTJ3 did, but the moments when the album is most pronouncedly in active revolt are still when it feels most essential".

Neil Z. Yeung of AllMusic gave a positive review, stating, "RTJ4 distills the anger and frustration of the people through Run the Jewels' hard-hitting, no-nonsense revolution anthems. Trim with no filler, this fourth set from the outspoken duo provides relevant history lessons that are more useful than a classroom textbook". Exclaim! critic Kyle Mullin said of El-P, "The New York rapper-producer's greatest contribution to RTJ4 is his vivid and varied sonic backdrops. His on-point production offers the lyrically superior Killer Mike both space and sonic support as he rises to new heights of artistry and activism, making El-P the kind of ally worth emulating". Mike Milenko of Clash said, "RTJ4 is a must listen. It is diverse enough to appeal to even the hardest crowds. Many genres are represented here, but lyrical hip-hop is at the forefront of all that Run the Jewels is. They stand out from the crowd, whilst invoking the people to stand up for themselves. There is not a bad song on the entire album and the production and features are second to none".

In his "Consumer Guide" column, Robert Christgau assigned the album an 'A+' grade and applauded the "vigor" of the duo's political direction and the lyrics as their "sharpest" yet, while declaring, "With trap on its opiated treadmill, the gangsta sonics that power El-P and Killer Mike's inchoate aggressiveness will feel tonic to anyone with both an appetite for music and a political pulse".

=== Year-end lists ===
Select year-end rankings of RTJ4
Publication	List	Rank	Ref.
The A.V. Club	The 20 Best Albums of 2020	3	
Billboard	The 50 Best Albums of 2020	14	
Billboard	The 20 Best Rap Albums of 2020	3	
Complex	The Best Albums of 2020	25	
Entertainment Weekly	The 15 Best Albums of 2020	3	
The Guardian	The 50 Best Albums of 2020	18	
The Independent	The 40 Best Albums of 2020	13	
NME	The 50 Best Albums of 2020	1	
Pitchfork	The 50 Best Albums of 2020	16	
Rolling Stone	The 50 Best Albums of 2020	6	
Spin	The 30 Best Albums of 2020	3	

== Commercial performance ==
RTJ4 debuted at number 10 on the US Billboard 200 with 38,000 album-equivalent units (including 30,000 pure album sales) from just two days of tracking, marking the duo's first top 10 album on the chart.

== Track listing ==
All tracks are produced by El-P, and co-produced by Little Shalimar and Wilder Zoby, except where noted.

RTJ4 track listing
No.	Title	Writer(s)	Producer(s)	Length
1.	"Yankee and the Brave (Ep. 4)"	Jaime Meline; Michael Render; Torbitt Schwartz; Wilder Schwartz		2:26
2.	"Ooh La La" (featuring Greg Nice and DJ Premier)	Meline; Render; T. Schwartz; W. Schwartz; Keith Elam^{[c]}; Christopher Martin^{[c]}; Darryl Barnes^{[c]}; Greg Mays^{[c]}		3:01
3.	"Out of Sight" (featuring 2 Chainz)	Meline; Render; Tauheed Epps; Leon Sylvers^{[d]}; T. Schwartz; W. Schwartz		3:21
4.	"Holy Calamafuck"	Meline; Render; Philip Thomas; Dave Sitek; T. Schwartz; W. Schwartz; Jordan Cruz	El-P; Sitek^{[a]}; Boots^{[a]}; Little Shalimar^{[b]}; Wilder Zoby^{[b]}	3:58
5.	"Goonies vs. E.T."	Meline; Render; T. Schwartz; W. Schwartz	El-P; Little Shalimar^{[a]}; Wilder Zoby^{[a]}; Nick Hook^{[b]}	3:03
6.	"Walking in the Snow"	Meline; Render; T. Schwartz; W. Schwartz; Lola Mitchell		3:55
7.	"Just" (featuring Pharrell Williams and Zack de la Rocha)	Meline; Render; Pharrell Williams; Zack de la Rocha; T. Schwartz; W. Schwartz		3:25
8.	"Never Look Back"	Meline; Render; T. Schwartz; W. Schwartz; Hugh Allison		2:57
9.	"The Ground Below"	Meline; Render; T. Schwartz; W. Schwartz; David Allen^{[e]}; Hugo Burnham^{[e]}; Andrew Gill^{[e]}; Jonathan King^{[e]}		2:32
10.	"Pulling the Pin" (featuring Mavis Staples and Josh Homme)	Meline; Render; Josh Homme; Cruz; T. Schwartz; W. Schwartz	El-P; Homme; Little Shalimar^{[a]}; Wilder Zoby^{[a]}; Boots^{[b]}	3:37
11.	"A Few Words for the Firing Squad (Radiation)"	Meline; Render; T. Schwartz; W. Schwartz; Matt Sweeney	El-P; Sweeney^{[a]}; Little Shalimar^{[a]}; Wilder Zoby^{[a]}	6:42
Total length:				38:57

Notes

- ^{^[a]} signifies a co-producer
- ^{^[b]} signifies an additional producer
- Track stylizations:
  - "Just" is stylized "JU$T"
  - "Goonies vs. E.T." is stylized "goonies vs. E.T."
  - All other track titles are stylized in all lowercase
- "A Few Words for the Firing Squad (Radiation)" includes the hidden track "Theme Music", listed in the album's liner notes as a separate track with identical credits.

Samples

- ^{^[c]} "Ooh La La" contains elements and a sample of "Dwyck", written by Keith Elam, Christopher Martin, Greg Mays, and Darryl Barnes, and performed by Gang Starr featuring Nice & Smooth.
- ^{^[d]} "Out of Sight" contains elements and a sample of "Misdemeanor", written by Leon Sylvers III and performed by Foster Sylvers.
- ^{^[e]} "The Ground Below" contains elements of "Ether", written by David Allen, Hugo Burnham, Andrew Gill, and Jonathan King, as performed by Gang of Four.

== Personnel ==
Credits are adapted from the album's digital booklet and Tidal.

Run the Jewels

- El-P – vocals (all tracks), additional string arrangements (11), executive producer, art direction
- Killer Mike – vocals (all tracks)

Musicians

- Trackstar the DJ – scratching (1, 3, 4, 8)
- David Ferguson – additional vocals (1)
- DJ Premier – scratches (2)
- 2 Chainz – vocals (3)
- Cutty Ranks – instruments (4)
- Z-Kicks – vocals (4)
- Theron "Uptown AP" Thomas – additional vocals (4)
- Kaushlesh "Garry" Purohit – tabla (4)
- Stuart Bogie – tenor saxophone (5)
- Cutmaster Swiff – scratches (5)
- Gangsta Boo – vocals (6)
- Pharrell Williams – vocals (7)
- Zack de la Rocha – vocals (7)
- Nicholas Ryan Gant – additional vocals (7)
- Mr. Muthafuckin' eXquire – vocals (8)
- Josh Homme – vocals, instruments (10)
- Mavis Staples – vocals (10)
- Matt Sweeney – guitar, additional vocals (11)
- ASAP Ferg – additional vocals (11)
- Jeremy Wilms – string arrangements (11)
- Dana Lyn – violin (11)
- Danton Boller – bass (11)
- Cochemea Gastelum – tenor saxophone (11)

Technical

- Joey Raia – mixing engineer
- Joe LaPorta – mastering engineer
- Nick Hook – recording engineer
- Leon Kelly – recording engineer
- Kaushlesh "Garry" Purohit – recording engineer (1, 3–11)
- Carl Bespolka – recording engineer (2–11)
- Taylor Jackson – recording engineer (3–11)
- Dylan Neustadter – recording engineer (3–11)
- Mat LeJeune – assistant recording engineer (3–11)
- Jonathan Lackey – assistant recording engineer (3–11)

Artwork

- Tim Saccenti – art direction, photography
- Smartbomb.net – layout, design
- Nick Gazin – lettering, font design

== Charts ==
Chart performance for RTJ4
Chart (2020)	Peak position
Australian Albums (ARIA)	25
Austrian Albums (Ö3 Austria)	35
Belgian Albums (Ultratop Flanders)	18
Belgian Albums (Ultratop Wallonia)	105
Canadian Albums (Billboard)	8
Dutch Albums (Album Top 100)	52
German Albums (Offizielle Top 100)	11
Irish Albums (Official Charts)	8
New Zealand Albums (RMNZ)	11
Norwegian Albums (VG-lista)	38
Scottish Albums (Official Charts)	3
Swiss Albums (Schweizer Hitparade)	24
UK Albums (Official Charts)	9
US Billboard 200	10
US Top R&B/Hip-Hop Albums (Billboard)	7

== Release history ==
Release dates and formats for RTJ4
Region	Date	Label(s)	Format(s)	Ref.
Various	June 3, 2020	Jewel Runners; BMG	Digital download; streaming	
Various	September 2020	Jewel Runners; BMG	CD	

== RTJ Cuatro ==
RTJ Cuatro

Remix album by Run the Jewels
- Released: November 11, 2022
- Genre: Latin
- Length: 43:14
- Labels: Jewel Runners; BMG

Run the Jewels chronology
RTJ4 (2020)	RTJ Cuatro (2022)

RTJ Cuatro (stylized as RTJ Cu4tro) is a remix album of RTJ4 entirely made by Latin American artists released on November 11, 2022, through Jewel Runners and BMG. It was curated and co-executive produced by Nick Hook, and supported by the promotional single "Caminando en la Nieve" (a remix of "Walking in the Snow") by him and Orestes Gomez featuring Akapellah, Apache and Pawmps.

=== Background and composition ===
In a press release, El-P said the album was more than a remix: "It’s a reimagining of RTJ4 through the lens of collaboration and a fusing of numerous musical cultures and influences". Run the Jewels also made a correlated fundraiser to help reunite families separated at the Mexico–United States border that accumulated over $116,000. According to various reviews, the album features "wildly different sounds" all under a Latin umbrella, including reggaeton, salsa-trap, dub, mariachi, and ranchera with bossa nova.

=== Critical reception ===
In a perfect-score review for The Daily Telegraph, critic Cat Woods said that "the original lyrics don't lose any painful poignancy". AllMusic gave RTJ Cuatro three and a half stars out of five, with reviewer Paul Simpson calling the project "largely successful" but "not quite as consistent as the original album". Matthew Ismael Ruiz of Pitchfork wrote how the album felt not "like a joke" but "a genuine interest in Latinx artists", awarding a score of 7.2/10.

=== Track listing ===
RTJ Cuatro track listing
No.	Title	Length
1.	"Yankee y el Valiente (Trooko's Versión)"	2:54
2.	"Ooh La La (Mexican Institute of Sound Versión)" (featuring Santa Fe Klan)	3:41
3.	"Fuera de Vista (Trooko's Versión)" (featuring Baco Exu do Blues)	4:04
4.	"Santa Calamifuck (Eva, Chucho, Yulian & Nick Hook's Versión)"	3:58
5.	"Goonies Contra E.T. (Danny Braco & Nick Hook's Versión)" (featuring El Individuo and Sarah La Morena)	3:09
6.	"Caminando en la Nieve (Orestes Gomez & Nick Hook's Versión)" (featuring Akapellah, Apache and Pawmps)	4:25
7.	"Just (Toy Selectah Versión)" (featuring Pharrell Williams and Zack de la Rocha)	4:00
8.	"Nunca Mirar Hacia Atrás (Bomba Estéreo's Versión)"	3:29
9.	"El Suelo Debajo (Son Rompe Pera's Versión)"	2:31
10.	"Tirando el Detonador (Mas Aya & Nick Hook's Versión)" (featuring Javire Arce and Lido Pimienta)	4:19
11.	"Unas Palabras para el Pelotón de Fusilamiento (Radiación) (Adrián Terrazas-González & El Producto's Versión)" (featuring Lin-Manuel Miranda)	6:40
Total length:		43:14
