= The Singing Dogs =

Musical recording project

Top row: Pussy, Pearl, Dolly Bottom row: King, Caesar

The Singing Dogs was a Danish musical recording project in the 1950s by recording engineer and ornithologist Carl Weismann and record producer Don Charles based around manipulated recordings of dogs barking.

Carl Weismann, while recording the sounds of birds for other projects, ended up with many recordings that were spoiled by dogs barking. Weismann found a new use for these spoiled takes by splicing together the pitches of dog barks into the pattern of songs. He teamed up with Don Charles, a record producer working in Copenhagen, Denmark (not to be confused with English singer and record producer Don Charles). Weismann used recordings of five dogs barking (their names were Dolly, Pearl, Pussy, Caesar, and King), spliced them on reel-to-reel tape, and arranged the pitches to the tune of the Stephen Foster song "Oh! Susanna". Charles provided the musical accompaniment. This was released by RCA Victor in 1955 as the A-side on a 7" single, with the B-side a medley of "Pat-a-Cake", "Three Blind Mice", and "Jingle Bells". The novelty record became a hit, reaching No. 22 on the US Billboard Pop Singles chart. The disc eventually sold over a million copies. In 1956, the troupe of dogs (with a fifth member, Pussy) were again recorded, yielding the single "Hot Dog Rock 'n Roll" b/w "Hot Dog Boogie". This recording is listed as being "directed" by Carl Weismann.

In 1971, RCA reissued "Jingle Bells" as a single, becoming a Christmas hit and hitting number one on the Billboard Christmas Singles chart in 1972. Since then, the track has received frequent media exposure during the Christmas and holiday season.

== See also ==
- Meow the Jewels
- Jingle Cats
