= Piganino =

Conjectural musical instrument

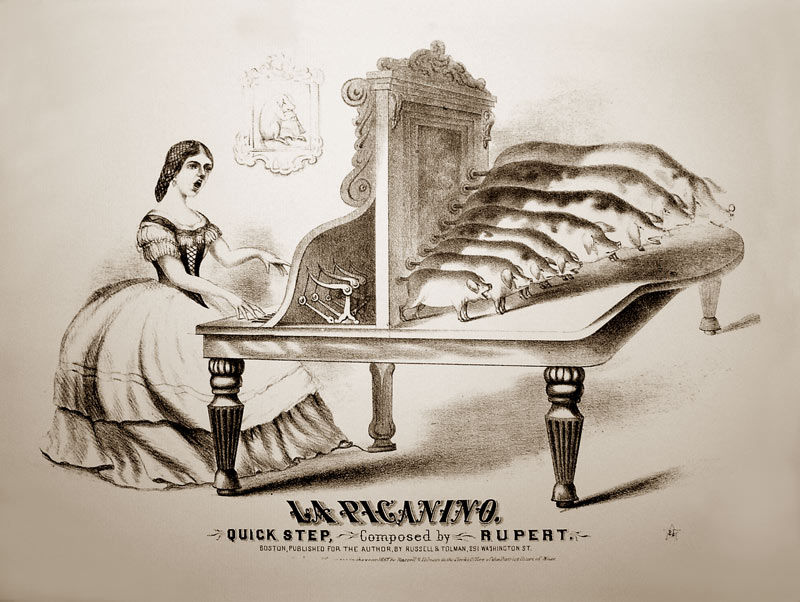
- Satirical illustration, 1867

Keyboard instrument
- Developed: 15th century

Example of a single pig 'oink'
The sound made by a pig

The Piganino is a conjectural musical instrument using a keyboard as to produce sound from pigs by poking them. Satirical use includes further terms as in German: Schweineorgel (pig organ), French: l’orgue à cochons, and "Hog Harmonium", "Swineway" (a play on "Steinway"), or "Porko Forte" (a play on "pianoforte") in English.

== Background ==
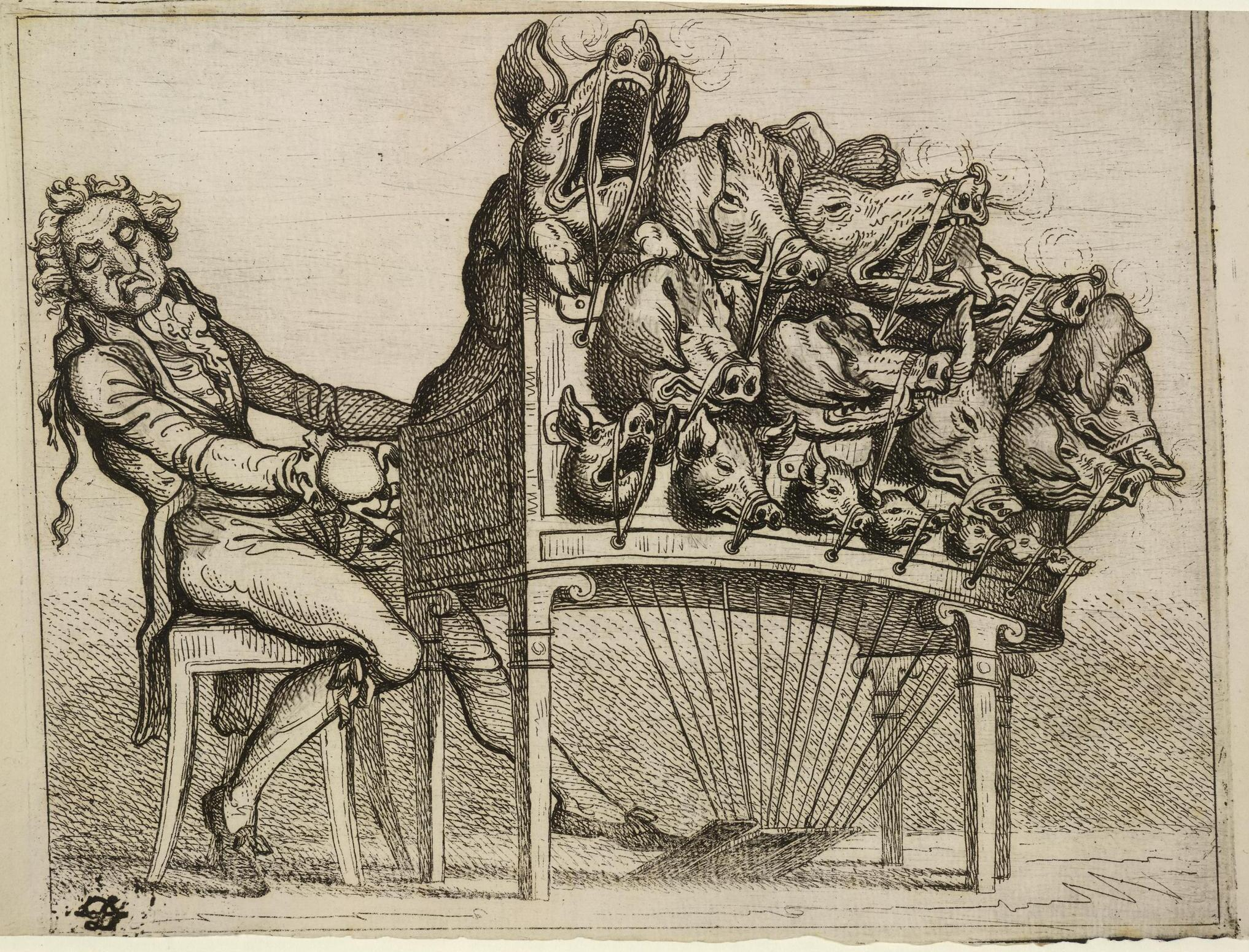
Satirical print of an instrument played by pulling the tails of pigs, c.1805

In the 15th century, Louis XI of France was said to have challenged Abbé de Baigne to develop such an instrument, believing that it was impossible to do so. The Abbé, a well known constructor, anecdotally accepted the order against payment. The instrument was a variant of an organ using a keyboard to pick the pigs, which were sorted sizewise.

That brutal monarch, Louis XI of France, is said to have constructed, with the assistance of the Abbé de Baigne, an instrument designated a "pig organ," for the production of natural sounds. The master of the royal music, having made a very large and varied assortment of swine, embracing specimens of all breeds and ages, these were carefully voiced, and placed in order, according to their several tones and semitones, and so arranged that a key-board communicated with them, severally and individually, by means of rods ending in sharp spikes. In this way a player, by touching any note, could instantly sound a corresponding note in nature, and was enabled to produce at will either natural melody or harmony! The result is said to have been striking, but not very grateful to human ears.

This may be compared to the "domestication" of sound in sampling, sequencing, and synthesis.

== Striped pigs in the US ==
The American quickstep song La Piganino mocked Italian influences on amateur music and popular culture in the 19th-century US. Beside lack of taste and vocal variety, the tendency to Italianize the names of all things chic and musical was lampooned. The cartoon anticipates the surrealistic machinery of Rube Goldberg. The 19th century played on various allegations, besides Piganino, further nicknames used for the fictitious instrument were "Hog Harmonium", "Swineway" or "Porko Forte".

Just as understatement of the ludicrous is a standard mode of caricature, so too is overstatement, as we see in this happy example. Burlesquing genteel taste, amateur vocalists, and the vogue for Italianizing the names of all things with musical associations, this cartoon also anticipates the ingenious and surrealistic machines of Rube Goldberg. We may suppose that in more than a few parlors "La Piganino" was slipped onto the music rack as a hint to the vocalist when the evening reached that point at which guests' ears began to droop.

The background was a commons-related conflict: poor farmers tended to let their pigs roam freely, feeding on what the rich did not use, whereas the rich preferred towns and property to be tidily divided. The striped pig was used to represent such untidiness in general and drinking men specifically. Piganino and related cartoons insofar referred to uppity and wannabee neighbors and their porcine conflicts with others. In parallel, the Schweinfurter Anzeiger as of 1873 had renewed interest on the French historical origin of the Schweineorgel.

== Le Libertin ==
In the film Le Libertin (2000), the philosopher Denis Diderot is depicted as a screwball eccentric, trying to have his forbidden Encyclopédie printed under the eyes of Catholic fanatics. The film is staged in the chateau of a crazy Baron, loosely based on the Baron d'Holbach. In reality, the Baron d'Holbach was a devoted atheist and important sponsor and contributor to the Encyclopédie. The film shows him as an adversary of Diderot and inventor of a large variety of funny machinery. The noise of a Piganino, one of the inventions, is being used to hide the printing of the forbidden encyclopaedia in the film.

== Further use ==
In German, Schweineorgel has also been used as a nickname for the accordion or harmonium, as those instruments were deemed rural and not appropriate for music on academic level. Athanasius Kircher's Katzenklavier uses a similar concept with cats. This sort of caricature was often used when new music styles came around or were adopted in musical realms that had not dealt with them previously. The cat organ, a similar instrument using cats, is used in stories which criticize the cruelty of royalty.

Monty Python's "Musical Mice" uses mice instead.
