= Run the Jewels (album) =

Studio album by Run the Jewels, El-P & Killer Mike
- Released: June 26, 2013
- Recorded: 2013
- Studios: Sneaky (Garrison, New York); The Space Pit (Brooklyn, New York)
- Genre: Hip-hop
- Length: 32:58
- Labels: Fool's Gold; Big Dada
- Producers: El-P; Little Shalimar; Wilder Zoby

Run the Jewels, El-P & Killer Mike chronology
Run the Jewels (2013)	Run the Jewels 2 (2014)

Singles from Run the Jewels
- 1. "36" Chain" Released: June 7, 2013

Run the Jewels is the debut studio album by American hip-hop duo Run the Jewels, which consists of Killer Mike and El-P. The album was released on June 26, 2013, through Fool's Gold Records.

== Background ==
On April 9, 2013 , Killer Mike and El-P announced they would be releasing a collaborative album under the name Run the Jewels. On May 15, 2013, El-P announced on his Twitter account that they had finished the album. On June 12, 2013, it was announced that the album would be released on June 29, 2013. On June 25, 2013, Killer Mike announced on his Twitter account that the album would be released the following day, June 26, 2013.

== Release and promotion ==
On April 29, 2013, the first song from the album, "Get It", was released. On May 31, 2013, the second song from the album, "Banana Clipper", featuring Big Boi, was released. On June 7, 2013, the third song from the album, "36" Chain", was released. On July 16, 2013, the music video was released for "36" Chain". The album was released in Europe on January 13, 2014, through Big Dada Recordings. On October 24, 2013, the music video was released for "Get It". On December 21, 2013, the music video was released for "A Christmas Fucking Miracle".

== Critical reception ==
Professional ratings
Aggregate scores
Source	Rating
AnyDecentMusic?	8.3/10
Metacritic	86/100
Review scores
Source	Rating
AllMusic	4/5 stars
Fact	4/5
The Guardian	5/5 stars
The Independent	4/5 stars
The Irish Times	4/5 stars
NME	8/10
Pitchfork	8.5/10
Q	4/5 stars
Rolling Stone	3.5/5 stars
Uncut	8/10

At Metacritic, the album received an average score of 86 out of 100, based on 25 reviews, which indicates "universal acclaim". Chris Coplan of Consequence of Sound gave the album four out of five stars, saying "Sure, Jay and Ye are probably friends, maybe even with secret, $100,000 matching bracelets that say “Besties 4 Life”. But, on record, their relationship felt mostly lopsided and uneven. Run the Jewels, on the other hand, is the very synthesis of El-P and Mike’s shared admiration and cohesive worldviews, an effort of the purest collaboration and mutual understanding. Now, let your heart fill with love and bang your damn head up and down." Maya Kalev of Fact gave the album four out of five stars, saying "Run the Jewels is savage and witty, rich in gritty truths and genuinely affecting wisdom. It may not be the best thing either artist has done, but fans of both will still find plenty to love." Philip Cosores of Paste gave the album an 8.6 out of 10, saying "It’s powerful in both delivery and in effect, without being heavy-handed or sacrificing form. Both rappers take the opportunity to show their longtime supporters that they were right all these years, that they bet on the right horses. And to those bandwagoners jumping on just now, pretty sure you are welcome, too." Neil Z. Yeung of AllMusic gave the album four out of five stars, saying "The introductory salvo from rap superduo Run the Jewels is a fine example of a union that is so perfect one might wonder how the universe existed before it. The combination of Killer Mike's menacing Hulk power and El-P's sneering quips and lively production make Run the Jewels a thrilling experience. Everything about RTJ is hyperbolic excess -- both in attitude and sound -- stomping boot prints into the concrete and hurling innocent bystanders through brick walls."

Lucy Jones of NME gave the album an eight out of ten, saying "Killer Mike’s Atlanta baritone drawl is like a rich, syrupy chocolate fudge cake compared to El-P’s hyper, sinewy flow and, along with supporting actors Big Boi and Prince Paul, the synergy here is bang on the money. It’s all laid out over old-school 808 beats that’ll make your head bounce, and booming, elephantine basslines that rollercoaster and ricochet through your intestines. A rough and rabid ride." Omar Burgess of HipHopDX gave the album four out of five stars, saying "If there’s a knock on Run The Jewels, it’s that it won’t be particularly accessible to those who have been desensitized by hours of dumbed-down radio and television programming. This is especially true during the summer months when most singles feature heavy doses of molly, Ciroc and bullshit lyrics. If anything, Killer Mike and El-P may have raised standards (and expectations) incredibly high last time around. Either way, one has to think the pair will once again find themselves on more than a few Album of the Year lists with Run The Jewels."

Nate Patrin of Pitchfork gave the album an 8.5 out of 10, saying "Yeah, it's a fun album, and it's probably the most affable thing they've done so far together. But don't take that for a weakness. They don't yank chains-- they snatch them." Patrick Taylor of RapReviews gave the album an eight out of ten, saying "El-P is already threatening to keep Run the Jewels going, so this self-titled debut is not the last you will hear of them. That's a good thing, because this album is two veteran MCs going hard and loose, feeding off one another's energy and pushing one another to step their game up. It's definitely the start to a beautiful friendship." Joe Gross of Rolling Stone gave the album three and a half stars out of five, saying, "On this release, available as a free download, the vibe is somewhere between the coherence of an album and the casual flow of a mixtape. El-P's beats are typically dense and Mike's rhymes rough-and-tumble. Big Boi of Outkast spits on "Banana Clipper" over dislocating synth stutter, and perennially underseen De La Soul producer Prince Paul shows up for the rattling "Twin Hype Back," on which Run the Jewels promise to "dance on your windpipes" and make it feel like a doctor's orders."

== Track listing ==
Side A
No.	Title	Writer(s)	Producer(s)	Length
1.	"Run the Jewels"	Jaime Meline; Michael Render	El-P; Little Shalimar^{[c]}	3:30
2.	"Banana Clipper" (featuring Big Boi)	Meline; Render; Antwan Patton	El-P	2:51
3.	"36" Chain"	Meline; Render	El-P; Little Shalimar^{[c]}	2:52
4.	"DDFH"	Meline; Render	El-P	3:05
5.	"Sea Legs"	Meline; Render	El-P	3:40

Side B
No.	Title	Writer(s)	Producer(s)	Length
6.	"Job Well Done" (featuring Until the Ribbon Breaks)	Meline; Render; Peter Lawrie-Winfield • Elliot Wall • James Gordon	El-P; Little Shalimar^{[c]}; Wilder Zoby^{[c]}	2:59
7.	"No Come Down"	Meline; Render	El-P; Little Shalimar^{[c]}	3:28
8.	"Get It"	Meline; Render	El-P	3:00
9.	"Twin Hype Back" (featuring Prince Paul as "Chest Rockwell")	Meline; Render; Paul Huston	El-P; Little Shalimar^{[c]}; Wilder Zoby^{[c]}	3:12
10.	"A Christmas Fucking Miracle"	Meline; Render	El-P; Little Shalimar^{[c]}	4:21
Total length:				32:58

European and Japanese special edition bonus tracks
No.	Title	Length
11.	"Pew Pew Pew" (featuring DJ Qbert)	3:08
12.	"Sea Legs" (Dave Sitek remix)	4:00
13.	"36" Chain" (BSBD remix)	3:54
Total length:		44:00

Note

- ^{^[c]} signifies a co-producer

== Personnel ==
Run the Jewels

- El-P – vocals, engineering
- Killer Mike – vocals

Additional contributors

- Joe LaPorta – mastering
- Ray Janos – mastering
- Joey Raia – mixing
- Nick Hook – engineering
- Little Shalimar – engineering
- Leon Kelly – engineering
- Mike Naz – mixing assistance
- Nicholas Gazin – art
- Ikey Owens – additional keyboards on "Run the Jewels"
- Smoota – horns on "Run the Jewels"
- Little Shalimar – additional guitar on "Sea Legs"
- DJ Trackstar – cuts on "Job Well Done"
- Matt Sweeney – additional guitar on "No Come Down"

== Charts ==
Chart (2013)	Peak position
US Independent Albums (Billboard)	32
US Top R&B/Hip-Hop Albums (Billboard)	27
US Top Rap Albums (Billboard)	21
US Indie Store Album Sales (Billboard)	6
