= Run the Jewels 2 =

Studio album by Run the Jewels
- Released: October 24, 2014
- Studio: ALC Laboratories; Cosmic Zoo (Los Angeles); Night Hunter; The Post; Rare Book Room; The Space Pit (Brooklyn); Sneaky (Garrison)
- Genre: Hip-hop
- Length: 38:56
- Label: Mass Appeal; RBC
- Producer: El-P

Run the Jewels chronology
| Run the Jewels (2013) | Run the Jewels 2 (2014) | Meow the Jewels (2015) |

Singles from Run the Jewels 2
- 1. "Blockbuster Night, Pt. 1" Released: September 2, 2014; 2. "Oh My Darling Don't Cry" Released: September 30, 2014; 3. "Close Your Eyes (And Count to Fuck)" Released: October 13, 2014

Run the Jewels 2 is the second studio album by American hip-hop duo Run the Jewels, which consists of Killer Mike and El-P. The album was released early for free on October 24, 2014, and the following day on iTunes. It was made available on CD and LP by Mass Appeal Records and RBC Records on October 28, 2014.

Run the Jewels 2 received widespread acclaim from critics for its darker and more layered production, Killer Mike and El-P's lyricism and chemistry and its guest contributions. Several publications also ranked it as the best album of 2014, including Pitchfork, Complex and Stereogum. The album debuted at number 50 on the US Billboard 200, selling 12,000 copies in the first week.

A parody remix album, Meow the Jewels, was released for free featuring beats created entirely from cat sounds. In addition to Meow the Jewels, a standard remix album was scheduled to be released by Fool's Gold Records in 2015 as well.

== Promotion ==
On September 2, 2014, Run the Jewels released a song titled "Blockbuster Night, Pt. 1", as the album's first single. On September 15, 2014, Run the Jewels released "Oh My Darling Don't Cry", the second offering from the album. "Oh My Darling Don't Cry" was later released on September 30, 2014, via digital distribution, as the album's second single. The album's third single, "Close Your Eyes (And Count to Fuck)" featuring Zack de la Rocha, was released on October 13, 2014.

== Critical reception ==
Professional ratings
Aggregate scores
| Source | Rating |
|---|---|
| AnyDecentMusic? | 8.4/10 |
| Metacritic | 89/100 |
Review scores
| Source | Rating |
| AllMusic | 5/5 stars |
| The A.V. Club | A− |
| The Guardian | 4/5 stars |
| The Irish Times | 4/5 stars |
| Los Angeles Times | 3.5/4 stars |
| NME | 9/10 |
| Pitchfork | 9.0/10 |
| Q | 4/5 stars |
| Rolling Stone | 4/5 stars |
| Slant Magazine | 5/5 stars |

Run the Jewels 2 was met with widespread critical acclaim. At Metacritic, which assigns a normalized rating out of 100 to reviews from mainstream publications, the album received an average score of 89, based on 35 reviews. Aggregator AnyDecentMusic? gave it 8.4 out of 10, based on their assessment of the critical consensus.

David Jeffries of AllMusic stated, "If the first album was the supernova, RTJ2 is the RTJ universe forming, proving that Mike and El-P's one-off can be a going, and ever growing, concern". Brian Josephs of The A.V. Club stated, "The sequel takes the simplistic thrills of the debut and expands the duo's natural chemistry. With Killer Mike grounded at the album's emotional core, El-P is free to indulge in his intrepid production tendencies". In The Irish Times, Jim Carroll dubbed the album "a case of upping the ante all round and then some" highlighting "both principals at the top of their game". Pat Levy of Consequence said, "An album like RTJ2 is rare. Decades from now, this album may just be revered as one of the best hip-hop records of our era, the total synchronicity of two talented artists reaching the apex of their prime".

Paul Maclnnes of The Guardian stated, "While the duo deliver hard-nosed disses at a rate of knots. Early, meanwhile, matches distorted synth with an old-school storytelling piece about pursuit and arrest by the police. It's an unrelenting style, which may sound like overkill to some, but there's no disputing its power and sophisticated composition". Kellan Miller of HipHopDX stated, "Throughout RTJ2 [El-P] holds his own rhyming alongside a superior wordsmith". James Rainis of Slant Magazine stated, "RTJ2 is the rare sequel that bests the beloved original in almost every facet". Dan Rys of XXL said, "For people looking for soulful, melodic hip-hop, this is not the album to pick up. Neither is it one for the kids who just want to repeat two words over and over again and call it a hook while jumping up and down and punching the air repeatedly. When listening to RTJ2, those feelings are translated into punches aimed at faces instead of spaces, and they always connect. The beats are grimy—typical of an El-P-produced project—and add even more grit to an album that doesn't ooze confidence so much as shoves you in the chest with it".

Randall Roberts of the Los Angeles Times stated, "Run the Jewels is the team of two indie titans, El-P and Killer Mike, who have upended convention by remaining idealistically true, artistically adventurous and creatively emboldened well into their second decade as rapper-producers. The pair's second album, released as a free download last week, proves it 11 times over". Al Horner of NME said, "Cranking the urgency and confrontation of last year's self-titled debut to neck-breaking levels of intensity, RTJ2 is an urgent, paranoid album for a violent, panicked time. It's a bleak future Run The Jewels envision for America, but as long as Mike and El-P are collaborating, at least the future of hip-hop is in safe hands". Ian Cohen of Pitchfork stated, "Sounding like nothing else and answering to nobody but its creators, Run the Jewels 2 is in a class by itself". Jon Dolan of Rolling Stone stated, "On their second album as Run the Jewels, noise-loving Brooklyn rapper-producer El-P and Atlanta's Killer Mike make the most explosive hip-hop you'll hear all year".

=== Rankings ===
Select rankings of Run the Jewels 2
| Publication | List | Rank | Ref. |
|---|---|---|---|
| The A.V. Club | The 20 Best Albums of 2014 | 2 | |
| Billboard | The 10 Best Rap Albums of 2014 | 2 | |
| Complex | The 50 Best Albums of 2014 | 1 | |
| Consequence | Top 50 Albums of 2014 | 2 | |
| Pitchfork | The 50 Best Albums of 2014 | 1 | |
| Pitchfork | The 200 Best Albums of the 2010s | 131 | |
| Rolling Stone | 40 Best Rap Albums of 2014 | 1 | |
| Rolling Stone | The 200 Greatest Hip-Hop Albums of All Time | 148 | |
| Spin | The 40 Best Hip Hop Albums of 2014 | 1 | |
| Stereogum | The 40 Best Rap Albums of 2014 | 1 | |
| Vibe | 46 Albums from 2014 That Are Actually Worth Your Money | 2 | |
| The Wire | The Top 50 Releases of the Year | 8 | |

== Commercial performance ==
Run the Jewels 2 debuted at number 50 on the US Billboard 200, with first-week sales of 12,000 copies in the United States.

== Track listing ==
Run the Jewels 2 track listing
| No. | Title | Writer(s) | Producer(s) | Length |
|---|---|---|---|---|
| 1. | "Jeopardy" | Jaime Meline; Michael Render | El-P; Little Shalimar^{[a]} | 3:21 |
| 2. | "Oh My Darling Don't Cry" | Meline; Render | El-P; Little Shalimar^{[a]}; Wilder Zoby^{[b]} | 3:24 |
| 3. | "Blockbuster Night, Pt. 1" | Meline; Render | El-P | 2:32 |
| 4. | "Close Your Eyes (And Count to Fuck)" (featuring Zack de la Rocha) | Meline; Render; Zack de la Rocha | El-P | 3:54 |
| 5. | "All My Life" | Meline; Render | El-P; Little Shalimar^{[a]} | 3:07 |
| 6. | "Lie, Cheat, Steal" | Meline; Render | El-P; Little Shalimar^{[a]}; Boots^{[b]} | 3:28 |
| 7. | "Early" (featuring Boots) | Meline; Render; Jordan Cruz | El-P; Little Shalimar^{[b]} | 3:44 |
| 8. | "All Due Respect" (featuring Travis Barker) | Meline; Render; Travis Barker | El-P; Little Shalimar^{[a]}; Wilder Zoby^{[a]} | 2:47 |
| 9. | "Love Again (Akinyele Back)" (featuring Gangsta Boo) | Meline; Render; Lola Mitchell | El-P | 3:45 |
| 10. | "Crown" (featuring Diane Coffee) | Meline; Render; Shaun Fleming | El-P; Little Shalimar | 3:45 |
| 11. | "Angel Duster" | Meline; Render | El-P; Little Shalimar^{[b]} | 5:09 |
| Total length: | | | | 38:56 |

Japanese and iTunes bonus track
| No. | Title | Writer(s) | Producer(s) | Length |
|---|---|---|---|---|
| 12. | "Blockbuster Night, Pt. 2" (featuring Despot and Wiki) | Meline; Render; Alec Reinstein; Patrick Morales | El-P | 2:39 |
| Total length: | | | | 41:35 |

Notes

- ^{^[a]} signifies a co-producer
- ^{^[b]} signifies an additional producer

== Personnel ==
Run the Jewels

- El-P – vocals
- Killer Mike – vocals

Additional musicians

- Wilder Zoby – additional organ (track 1), keyboards (11)
- Smoota – additional trombone (1)
- Trackstar the DJ – scratches (3, 4)
- Michael Winslow – robot voice (2)
- Boots – additional vocals (5)
- Matt Sweeney – additional guitar (5)
- James McNew – additional bass (7)
- Travis Barker – additional drums (8)
- Shay Bigga – additional vocals (track 9)
- Diane Coffee – additional piano, additional vocals (10)
- Isaiah "Ikey" Owens – piano (11)
- Kareem Bunton – additional vocals (11)
- Kenya Hawkins – additional vocals (11)
- Margot – strings (11)

Technical

- Joe LaPorta – mastering
- Joey Raia – mixing
- Bradley Post – engineering
- Leon Kelly – engineering
- Little Shalimar – engineering
- Nicolas Vernhes – engineering
- Nocando – engineering
- Simen Solvang – engineering

== Charts ==
=== Weekly charts ===
Chart performance for Run the Jewels 2
| Chart (2015–2017) | Peak position |
|---|---|
| Belgian Albums (Ultratop Flanders) | 141 |
| US Billboard 200 | 50 |
| US Top R&B/Hip-Hop Albums (Billboard) | 9 |

=== Year-end charts ===
2015 year-end chart performance for Run the Jewels 2
| Chart (2015) | Position |
|---|---|
| US Top R&B/Hip-Hop Albums (Billboard) | 60 |

== Release history ==
Release dates and formats for Run the Jewels 2
| Region | Date | Label(s) | Format(s) | Ref. |
|---|---|---|---|---|
| Various | October 24, 2014 | Mass Appeal; RBC | Digital download | |
| Various | October 28, 2014 | Mass Appeal; RBC | CD; LP | |
