= Close Your Eyes (And Count to Fuck) =

Single by Run the Jewels featuring Zack de la Rocha

from the album Run the Jewels 2
- Released: September 30, 2014
- Recorded: 2014
- Genre: Alternative hip-hop; hardcore hip-hop
- Length: 3:54
- Label: Mass Appeal
- Songwriters: Zack de la Rocha; Jaime Meline; Michael Render
- Producer: El-P

Run the Jewels singles chronology
"Oh My Darling Don't Cry" (2014)	"Close Your Eyes (And Count to Fuck)" (2014)	"Rubble Kings Theme (Dynamite)" (2015)

"Close Your Eyes (And Count to Fuck)" is a song by American hip-hop duo Run the Jewels, with guest vocals by Zack de la Rocha. It was released as the second single from their second studio album, Run the Jewels 2 (2014), on September 30, 2014.

== Origin ==
El-P explained de la Rocha's participation in the song as the result of a chance encounter: "when I was in L.A. working on the record I bumped in to him literally on the way to the studio. He came by and listened to what we had and a day later was recording with us."

== Music video ==
The music video (directed by AG Rojas), which Exclaim! called "fiery", portrays an extended wrestling match between an exhausted white police officer (Shea Whigham) and an equally-exhausted black civilian (LaKeith Stanfield).

Rolling Stone noted that at no point in the fight does either combatant reach for the officer's gun, while Spin stated that it was "immensely raw, nuanced, and powerful", and emphasized that, throughout the fight, "(n)either [combatant] really gains an edge over the other one, and it's unclear why, exactly, they were fighting in the first place." The Riverfront Times (which considered the song to be "incendiary") interpreted the video's concluding scene — the two men fight their way into a house, up a flight of stairs, and into a bedroom, where they collapse on the same bed — to mean that "both men will rest and awaken tomorrow to begin the battle anew".

== Reception ==
Fact described the song as "breathless" and "pneumatic", while Vibe found it to be "highly energetic". Stereogum called it "hammering (and) buzzing" and "just a ridiculous banger (...) that you obviously need to hear this minute", and compared its hook — de la Rocha's voice "chopped up" — to the work of Swiss Beatz.

The Pittsburgh Post-Gazette noted that it is "arguably [Run the Jewels]' most popular song"; similarly, The Daily Reveille declared it to be "(a)rguably the best song on (the album)", lauding de la Rocha's contributions to the song — in particular the "arresting hook at the beginning".

== Certifications ==
Region	Certification	Certified units/sales
United States (RIAA)	Gold	500,000^{‡}
^{‡} Sales+streaming figures based on certification alone.
