= Legend Has It =

Single by Run the Jewels

from the album Run the Jewels 3
- Released: December 2, 2016
- Recorded: January 2015 – September 2016
- Studio: RTJ
- Genre: Hip-hop
- Length: 3:25
- Label: Run the Jewels, Inc.
- Songwriters: Jaime Meline; Michael Render
- Producer: El-P

Run the Jewels singles chronology
"2100" (2016)	"Legend Has It" (2016)	"Mean Demeanor" (2017)

"Legend Has It" is a song by American hip-hop duo Run the Jewels. It was released as the third single from their third studio album, Run the Jewels 3 (2016), on December 2, 2016. The track samples the song “Knots” by English progressive rock band Gentle Giant.

== Music video ==
The music video, which Spin called "hallucinatory" and "politically charged", depicts Run the Jewels in a police lineup, while "tripping on acid" as police officers try to get a witness to select them; the numbers that appear on the screen throughout the video represent "the rising rates of mass incarceration [in the United States] between 1980 and 2010".

== Reception ==
Pitchfork called the song a "non-stop rapathon", and "[Run the Jewels] at its most lethal, funny, and ferocious". Rolling Stone noted its "steady Producto beat that wobbles with ambient, sci-fi effects", while DIY considered the lyrics to demonstrate Run the Jewels' characteristic "playfulness".

The song achieved RIAA gold certification in December 2019 for selling 500,000 total units in the United States.

== Licensing ==
The song was used in the trailer for the 2018 Marvel Studios film Black Panther, and, subsequently, in a Black Panther-themed Lexus commercial. As well, Run the Jewels announced a partnership with a Florida brewer to produce a "Legend Has It" pilsner.

In 2018, El-P reported that the National Football League had sought permission to play "Legend Has It" in stadiums during the Super Bowl, and that he and Killer Mike had denied this permission in response to the NFL's decision to fine players who participated in taking a knee; he also stated that the NFL had sought to pay "zero dollars" for the use of the song. The song was also used in the video game Rogue Company.

== Certifications ==
Region	Certification	Certified units/sales
United States (RIAA)	Gold	500,000^{‡}
^{‡} Sales+streaming figures based on certification alone.
