= Run the Jewels =

American hip hop superduo

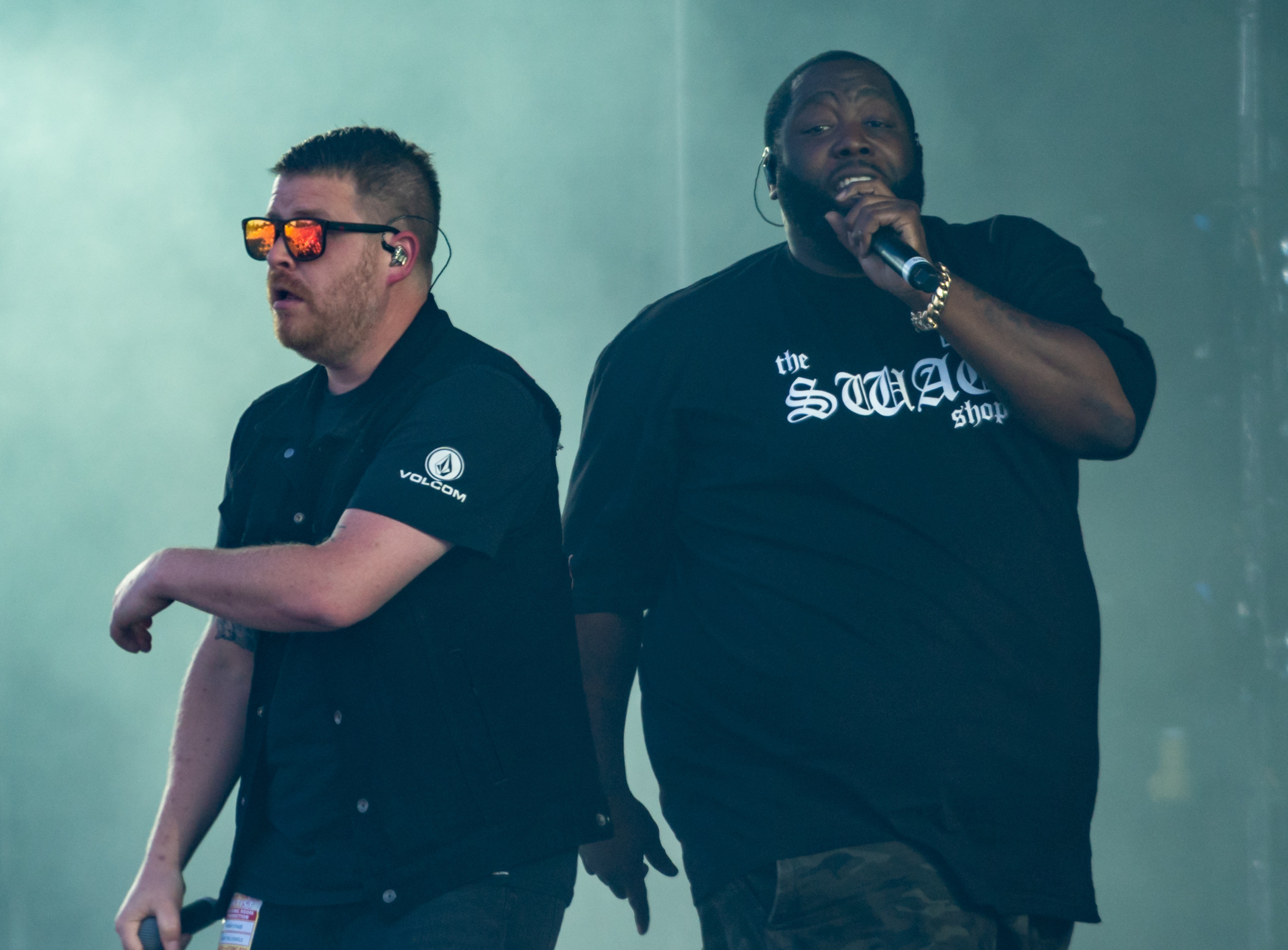
- El-P (left) and Killer Mike in 2018

Background information
- Also known as: RTJ; Yankee and the Brave
- Origin: United States
- Genre: Hip-hop
- Years active: 2013–present
- Labels: Jewel Runners; RBC; BMG; Mass Appeal; Fool's Gold; Big Dada; Definitive Jux; Seeker
- Members: El-P; Killer Mike
- Website: runthejewels.com

Run the Jewels, also known by the initials RTJ, is an American hip-hop superduo, composed of Brooklyn-based rapper and producer El-P and Atlanta-based rapper Killer Mike. The duo signed with Fool's Gold Records to release their self-titled debut album (2013), which was critically acclaimed along with their subsequent albums—Run the Jewels 2 (2014), Run the Jewels 3 (2016), and RTJ4 (2020).

== History ==
=== Formation and Run the Jewels (2011–2013) ===
El-P was active professionally in music from the early 1990s, first with Company Flow and then as a solo artist and in-demand producer for others. Killer Mike's recording debut was in 2000 with Outkast on the Stankonia album, and his solo debut appeared in 2003.

The duo were first introduced to each other by Cartoon Network executive Jason DeMarco in 2011. El-P later produced Mike's 2012 album R.A.P. Music, which was soon followed by Mike's appearance on the track "Tougher Colder Killer" from El-P's 2012 album Cancer 4 Cure. When R.A.P. Music and Cancer 4 Cure were released within weeks of each other, the two decided to tour together. The success of the tour eventually led to the decision to form Run the Jewels, with the duo taking their name from a lyric in the 1990 LL Cool J song "Cheesy Rat Blues".

On June 26, 2013, Run the Jewels released their self-titled debut album on Fool's Gold Records as a free download. They also released "36" Chain" as a free track as part of the 2013 edition of the yearly Adult Swim Singles Program.

=== Run the Jewels 2 (2014–2015) ===
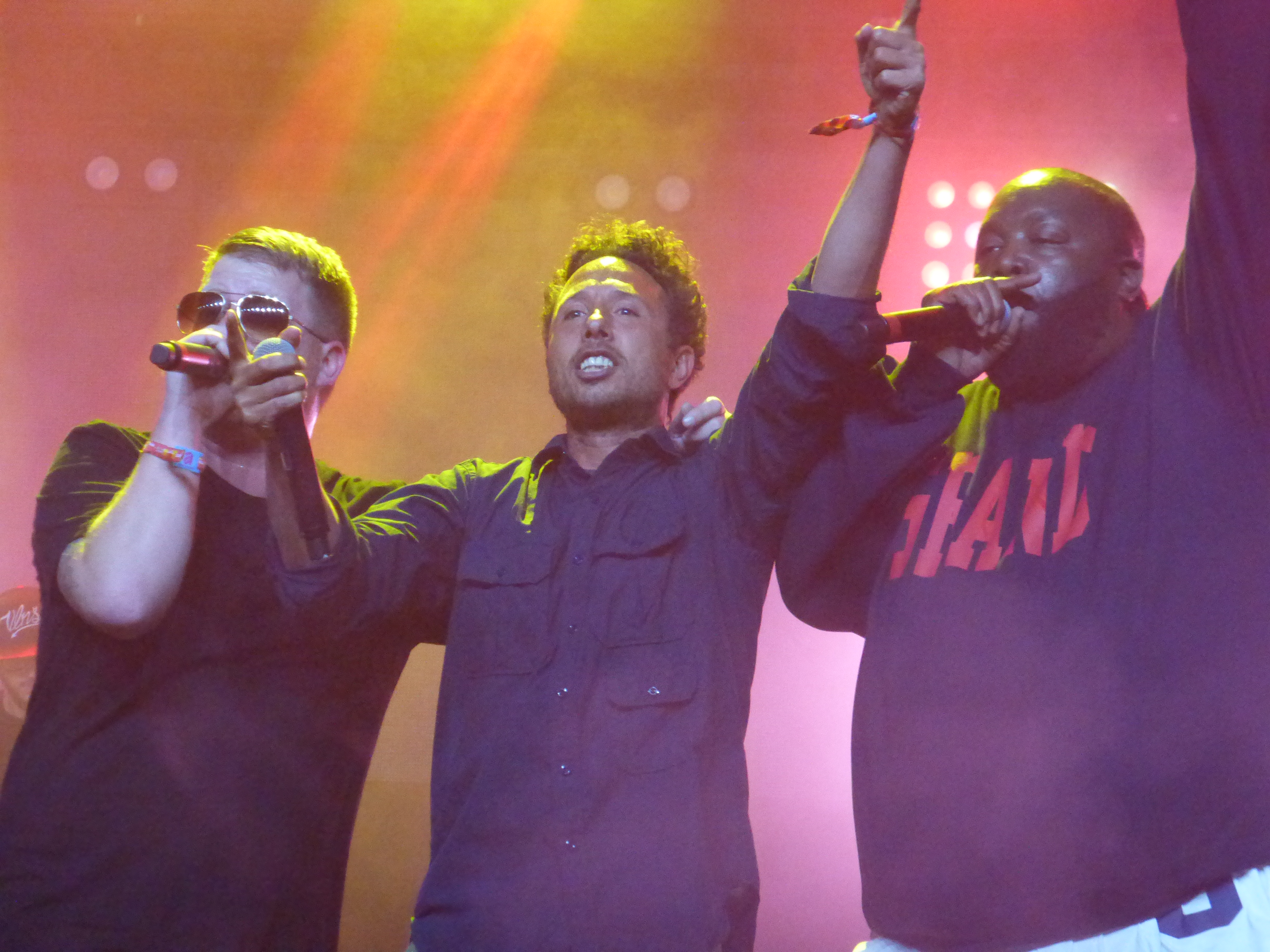
El-P (left) and Killer Mike (right) with Zack de la Rocha (center) at the 2015 Coachella Festival

Run the Jewels 2 was released through Mass Appeal Records on October 24, 2014. A light-hearted remix album composed entirely of cat sounds titled Meow the Jewels was released on September 25, 2015. It features guest production from the likes of Prince Paul, Boots, Geoff Barrow, Zola Jesus, The Alchemist, Just Blaze and others. Proceeds from the album went entirely to charity. They also announced the release of a traditional remix album of Run the Jewels 2 which was to be released via Fool's Gold Records in 2015. Like the previous year, Adult Swim released the 2014 edition of their compilation, which saw the release of the lead single from Run the Jewels 2, "Oh My Darling (Don't Cry)", while the non-album single "Rubble Kings (Dynamite on the Street)" was released in 2015.

Run the Jewels supported Jack White at Madison Square Garden on January 30, 2015. In early 2015, it was announced that the band would perform at the Coachella Valley Music and Arts Festival in April and the Bonnaroo Music and Arts Festival in June. In addition to these larger festivals, RTJ also announced performances at the Boston Calling Music Festival, the Big Guava Music Festival, the Pitchfork Music Festival, the Austin City Limits Music Festival, and the Music Midtown Festival in Atlanta, Georgia; Blink-182 drummer Travis Barker was slated to join them. Trackstar the DJ served as Run the Jewels' DJ during their RTJ2 tour.

Killer Mike revealed that the duo would begin work on Run the Jewels 3 in January 2015. Run the Jewels released an exclusive 12-inch on April 18, 2015, in conjunction with Record Store Day. The record included a new track ("Bust No Moves" feat. SL Jones) in addition to three previously released songs.

The single "Lie, Cheat, Steal", released in 2015, was later used as the theme song to the Netflix documentary series Dirty Money.

=== Run the Jewels 3 (2016–2018) ===
In 2016, Adult Swim was once again used to release "Talk to Me" from Run the Jewels 3. Run the Jewels then released the song "Love Again" featuring Gangsta Boo. "Love Again" went on to win Run the Jewels the UK Music Video Awards for "Best Urban Video" and "Best Editing in a Video".

February 6, 2016, the duo performed three songs ("Talk to Me", "Legend Has It", "A Report to the Shareholders") for NPR's Music Tiny Desk Concert.

At some point in the future they are going to try and label us a political rap group, and that we are not, we do not care what political party you belong to, we don't care who you supported, we don't care what you are doing tomorrow politically, we care that socially every one of you know: you are absolutely born free and nothing has a right to interrupt that freedom. We love you.

— Killer Mike, "Run The Jewels: NPR Music Tiny Desk Concert", YouTube (14 February 2017)

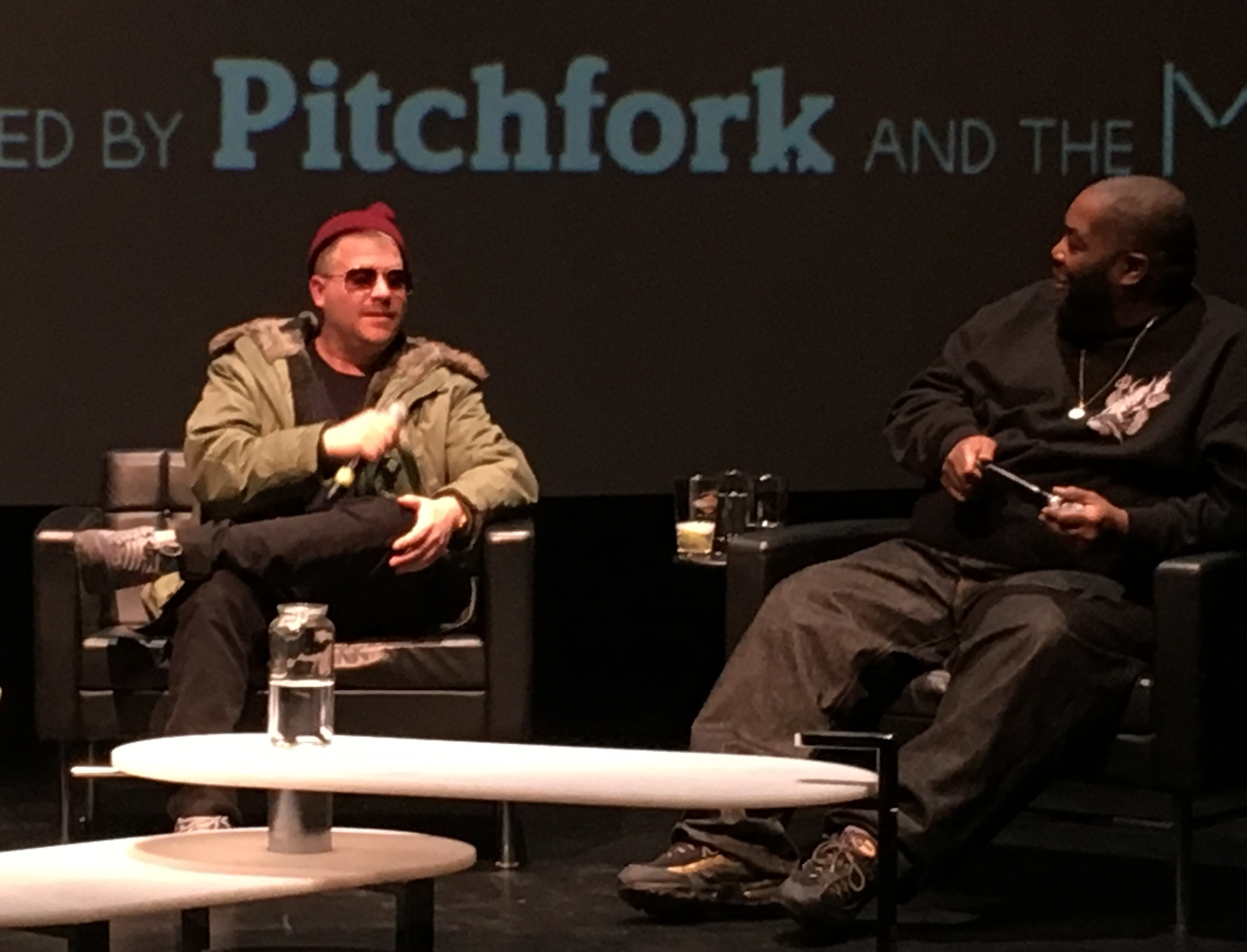
El-P and Killer Mike speaking at the Museum of Contemporary Art Chicago in 2016.

On August 24, 2016, DJ Shadow's single "Nobody Speak" featuring the duo was released, alongside a music video of brawling politicians just before the 2016 election. This song has been featured in several TV shows and movies. The song was produced by the Mass Appeal record label and DJ Shadow, which he calls the standout track on his album The Mountain Will Fall. The duo were extras in the video. The video was directed by Sam Pilling. produced by Pulse Films, and starred Igor Tsyshkevych and Ian Bailey. It was shot in NYC, London and Ukraine.

Run the Jewels 3 was digitally released on December 24, 2016, three weeks prior to its previously announced release date of January 13, 2017. Physical release of the album appeared on January 13 in the United States and January 20 elsewhere. In the same month, Adult Swim's late-night anime block Toonami promoted the album by replacing regular music with tracks from the album.

In June 2017, the track "Legend Has It" from Run the Jewels 3 was featured in the teaser trailer for Marvel's Black Panther during game four of the 2017 NBA Finals, and was viewed 89 million times in 24 hours. Multiple Run the Jewels tracks were also featured in the 2017 action film Baby Driver, which also featured a cameo by Killer Mike. In September 2017, Run the Jewels released "Mean Demeanor", a track created for the soccer video game FIFA 18.

In March 2018, Adult Swim released a Run the Jewels/Rick and Morty crossover music video for "Oh Mama". The music was a remix of "Oh Mama" from Run the Jewels 3 accompanied by sound effects from a Rick and Morty short. The effort was directed by Juan Meza-León, and was released prior to Run the Jewels headlining the 2018 Adult Swim Festival on October 7, 2018.

On December 12, 2019, the single "Legend Has It" was certified gold by the Recording Industry Association of America.

=== RTJ4 (2018–present) ===
On October 11, 2018, Run the Jewels released a new song titled "Let's Go (The Royal We)", which was featured in that year's superhero film Venom and debuted on Zane Lowe's Apple Music's Beats 1 show. It was also confirmed that their fourth album was in the works.

On March 22, 2020, Run the Jewels released "Yankee and the Brave (ep.4)" as the first single from RTJ4. Four days later, they released the second single, "Ooh LA LA" (featuring Greg Nice and DJ Premier). The album was released digitally on June 3, 2020, two days earlier than their announced released date of June 5, with a physical release in September 2020. It was their first album to be officially titled under its abbreviated name as opposed to the formatting of previous albums, which would have rendered the title Run the Jewels 4. On June 6, as they had done with the preceding album, Toonami once again promoted the album by replacing regular music in their promos with music from the album. In July, the duo announced the release of their own cannabis strain with a "sweet fruit cake [taste] with a herbal tea finish", named after their single "Ooh LA LA".

In an attempt to increase voter turnout for the 2020 elections, Run the Jewels performed RTJ4 in its entirety from a warehouse during a YouTube stream titled Holy Calamavote (a reference to their song "Holy Calamafuck") on October 18. Hosted by Eric Andre in the style of a parody telethon and sponsored by Adult Swim and Ben & Jerry's, the performance featured appearances from all of the collaborators on the album, with some appearing in person while others appeared via pre-recorded performances played on large screens in the background.

Alongside several other artists, Run the Jewels provided music for the video game Cyberpunk 2077, released in December 2020. One month before the game's release, they released a song they wrote for the game called "No Save Point", accompanied by a music video which shows them performing the song within the game's world. They were credited as Yankee and the Brave for this song. Around the same time, the video game Spider-Man: Miles Morales was released, which features an instrumental version of "The Ground Below" from RTJ4 in the background during a mission. The duo composed the opening theme for the direct-to-video Adult Swim film, Aqua Teen Forever: Plantasm, which released on November 8, 2022.

On October 21, 2022, the group announced a remix album of RTJ4 titled RTJ Cu4tro. It featured remixes from Latin artists and was released on November 11.

On February 24, 2025, it was announced that Run the Jewels would be joining Wu-Tang Clan on its farewell tour as the opening act.

On June 17, 2026, as a part of the 10th anniversary celebration of The Mountain Will Fall, Run the Jewels, alongside Denzel Curry and TiaCorine, were featured in DJ Shadow's revamped version of "Nobody Speak", "Nobody Speak Part 2".

== Tributes ==
As part of the promotion for Run the Jewels 2, the duo started a "Tag the Jewels" movement encouraging graffiti artists from around the world to tag their rendition of the duo's signature "pistol and fist" hand gesture, as featured on all of their album covers. 30 artists were invited to participate in the movement, creating large murals on six continents.

The same "pistol and fist" gesture was featured on the covers of several Marvel comic books since 2015. Marvel editor-in-chief Axel Alonso was the driving force behind the gesture's incorporation into variant covers for Deadpool #45, Howard the Duck #2, Deadpool's Secret Secret Wars #1, Black Panther #2, Cage #1 and Doctor Strange/Punisher: Magic Bullets #1 variant.

== Other media ==
A biography of the group and analysis of their cultural impact titled Kill Your Masters: Run The Jewels and the World That Made Them was published by the University of Georgia Press in 2024. It is described as "the buddy-movie-like story of how they got there" which "parallels the incredible changes the music industry has gone through over the past twenty-five years." The book was written by Dutch journalist Jaap van der Doelen and received generally favourable reviews in publications like The Wire. On the GPB podcast Narrative Edge, host Peter Biello noted how "this book is as much about Run the Jewels as it is about the other half of its subtitle" and lauded the author's skill as a writer and ability at "reminding people of the context".

In the video game Borderlands 3, one of playable character FL4K's pets will throw up the duo's "pistol and fist" gesture when interacted with. In the video game Gears of War 4, a promotional skin bundle featuring Run the Jewels as playable characters was released in early 2017. For the video game Cyberpunk 2077, a photo mode pose option is the duo's signature pistol-and-fist gesture.

== Members ==
- El-P (Jaime Stuart Meline) – vocals, production
- Killer Mike (Michael Render) – vocals

Touring members

- Gabe Moskoff (as "Trackstar the DJ") – turntables, samples, backing vocals

== Discography ==
Studio albums

- Run the Jewels (2013)
- Run the Jewels 2 (2014)
- Run the Jewels 3 (2016)
- RTJ4 (2020)

== Tours ==
Headlining

- Run the Jewels Tour (2015)
- Run the World Tour (2017)

Supporting

- Lorde – Melodrama World Tour (2018)
- Rage Against the Machine – Public Service Announcement Tour (2022)
- Wu-Tang Clan – Wu-Tang Forever: The Final Chamber (2025)

== Awards and nominations ==
=== Grammy Awards ===
The Grammy Awards is an annual awards ceremony presented by The Recording Academy. Run The Jewels has been nominated for one award.

Year	Nominee / work	Award	Result	Ref.
2018	"Chase Me" (Danger Mouse Featuring Run The Jewels & Big Boi)	Best Rap Song	Nominated	

=== Berlin Music Video Awards ===
The Berlin Music Video Awards is an international music festivals that promotes the art of music videos.

Year	Nominee / work	Award	Result
2016	meopurrdy	Most Bizarre	Won
2021	Out of Sight feat. 2 Chainz	Best Director	Nominated

=== UK Music Video Awards ===
The UK Music Video Awards is an annual celebration of creativity, technical excellence and innovation in music video and moving image for music. Run The Jewels have won two awards from six nominations.

Year	Nominee / work	Award	Result	Ref.
2014	A Christmas F*cking Miracle	Best Urban Video – Budget	Nominated	
2015	Close Your Eyes (and Count to Fuck) (feat Zack de la Rocha)	Best Urban Video-International	Nominated	
2015	Lie, Cheat, Steal	Best Urban Video – Budget	Nominated	
2015	Early	Best Lyric Video	Nominated	
2016	Love Again (with Gangsta Boo)	Best Urban Video-International	Won	
2016	Love Again (with Gangsta Boo)	Best Editing in a Video	Won	

=== NME Awards ===
The NME Awards is an annual music awards show in the United Kingdom, founded by the music magazine, NME (New Musical Express) . Run the Jewels have received three nominations (Best Album in 2015, and Best Festival Band and Best International Band in 2016) and won two awards (Best Festival Band and Best International Band in 2016).

Year	Nominee / work	Award	Result	Ref.
2016	Run the Jewels	Best International Band	Won	

=== A2IM Libera Awards ===
The A2IM Libera Awards is an annual music awards show created by the American Association of Independent Music. Run the Jewels have won five awards from eleven nominations.

Year	Nominee / work	Award	Result	Ref.
2015	Meow the Jewels / Tag the Jewels	Marketing Genius Award	Won	
2015	Run the Jewels	Hardest Working Artist of the Year	Nominated	
2015	Run the Jewels 2	Groundbreaking Album of the Year	Won	
2015	Run the Jewels 2	Album of the Year	Nominated	
2016	Run the Jewels	Best Live Act	Nominated	
2016	Meow the Jewels	Creative Packaging	Nominated	
2016	#12DaysofRTJ	Marketing Genius Award	Won	
2016	Close Your Eyes (and Count to F*ck)	Video of the Year	Won	
2017	Run the Jewels 3	Album of the Year	Nominated	
2017	Run the Jewels 3	Best Rap/Hip-Hop Album	Won	
2017	Run the Jewels	Best Live Act	Nominated	

=== MTV Video Music Awards ===
Year	Nominee / work	Award	Result	Ref.
2017	"Nobody Speak" (with DJ Shadow)	Best Cinematography	Nominated	

=== mtvU Woodie Awards ===
Year	Nominee / work	Award	Result	Ref.
2015	Run the Jewels	Woodie of the Year	Nominated	
