= Laura Marling discography =

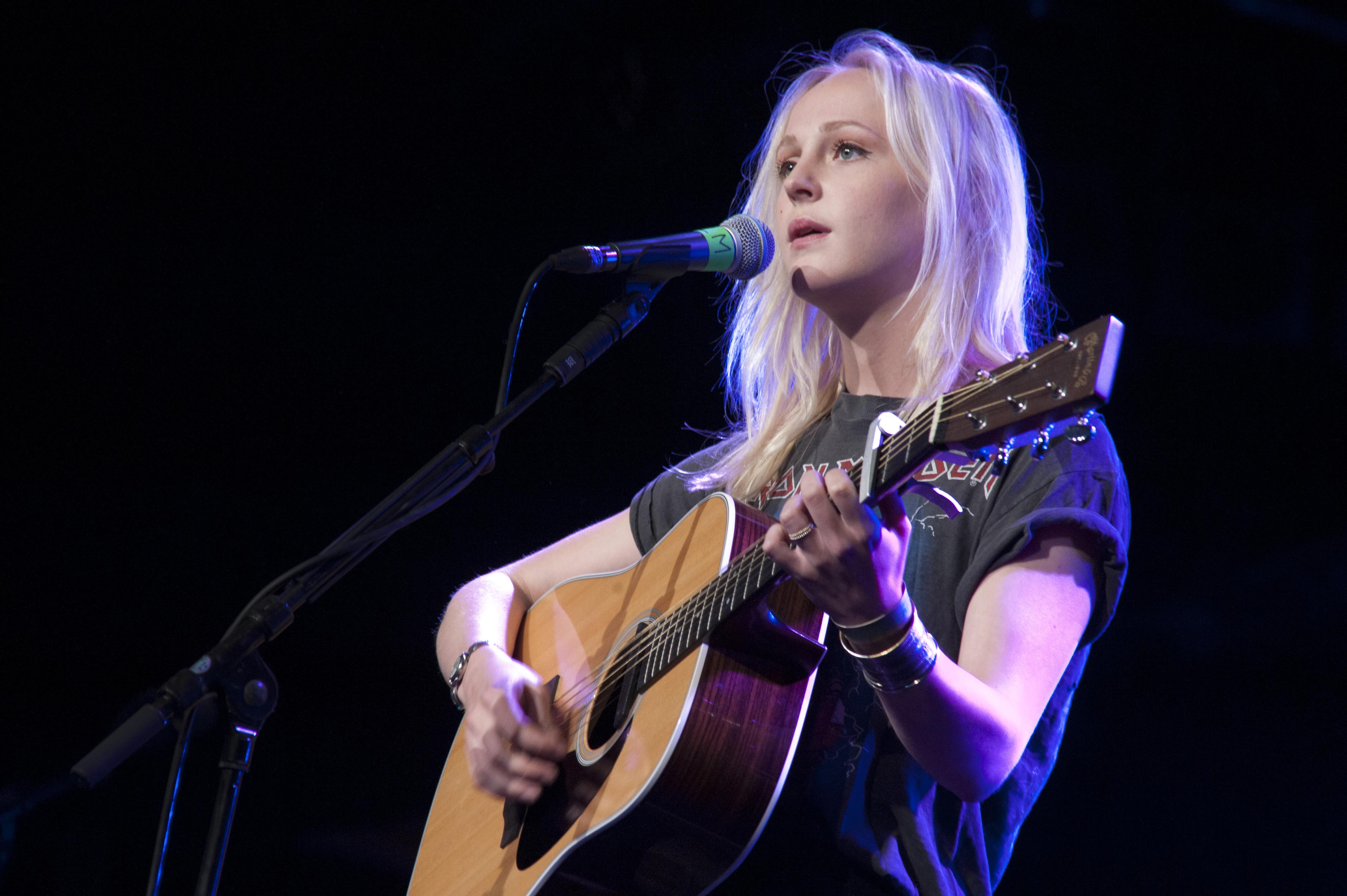
- Marling at the 2011 Cambridge Folk Festival
- Studio albums: 8
- Extended plays: 6
- Live albums: 1
- Singles: 17

The discography of Laura Marling, an English folk musician, consists of eight studio albums, one live album, six extended plays and seventeen singles. She has also featured on singles by two other artists and released an EP in collaboration with Mumford and Sons and Indian collective Dharohar Project in 2010.

== Albums ==
=== Studio albums ===
List of studio albums, with selected chart positions and certifications
Title	Album details	Peak chart positions									Sales	Certifications
Title	Album details	UK	AUS	BEL (FL)	GRC	IRL	NLD	NOR	SWI	US	Sales	Certifications
Alas, I Cannot Swim	Released: 4 February 2008 (UK); Label: Virgin; Formats: CD, LP, digital download	45	98	—	—	—	—	—	—	—		BPI: Gold
I Speak Because I Can	Released: 22 March 2010 (UK); Label: Virgin; Formats: CD, LP, digital download	4	7	59	23	13	91	—	—	—	UK: 250,315	BPI: Gold
A Creature I Don't Know	Released: 9 September 2011 (UK); Label: Virgin; Formats: CD, LP, digital download	4	12	36	—	8	72	—	92	99	UK: 100,000	BPI: Gold
Once I Was an Eagle	Released: 27 May 2013 (UK); Label: Virgin; Formats: CD, LP, digital download	3	12	18	—	3	14	37	—	49	US: 31,000	BPI: Silver
Short Movie	Released: 23 March 2015 (UK); Label: Virgin; Formats: CD, LP, digital download	7	30	40	—	12	38	—	—	148		
Semper Femina	Released: 10 March 2017 (UK); Label: More Alarming; Formats: CD, LP, digital download	5	19	21	—	9	22	—	46	—		
Song for Our Daughter	Released: 10 April 2020 (UK); Label: Chrysalis / Partisan; Formats: CD, LP, digital download	6	—	86	—	—	61	—	78	—	UK: 20,392	
Patterns in Repeat	Released: 25 October 2024 (UK); Label: Chrysalis / Partisan; Formats: CD, LP, digital download	13	—	126	—	85	—	—	—	—		

=== Live albums ===
List of live albums
Title	Album details
Live from York Minster	Released: 15 April 2012 (UK); Label: Diverse Records; Formats: LP
Live from Union Chapel	Released: 11 December 2020 (UK); Label: Chrysalis/Partisan; Formats: LP
Live at Albert Hall, Manchester	Released: 18 April 2026; Label: Chrysalis/Partisan; Formats: LP

== Extended plays ==
List of extended plays
Title	EP details	Peak chart positions
Title	EP details	UK
The London Town EP	Released: 9 April 2007 (UK); Label: WayOutWest; Formats: CD, LP	—
My Manic and I	Released: 10 August 2007 (UK); Label: Virgin; Formats: CD, LP	—
iTunes Live: London Sessions	Released: 11 March 2008 (UK); Label: Virgin; Formats: Digital download	—
Cross Your Fingers	Released: 8 June 2008 (UK); Label: Virgin; Formats: Digital download	—
Mumford & Sons, Laura Marling & Dharohar Project (with Dharohar Project and Mumford & Sons)	Released: 2 July 2010 (UK); Label: Universal; Formats: CD, LP, digital download	125
iTunes Festival: London 2010 (with Dharohar Project and Mumford & Sons)	Released: 18 July 2010 (UK); Label: Universal; Formats: Digital download	—
The Lockdown Sessions	Released: 4 December 2020 (UK); Label: Chrysalis/Partisan; Formats: Vinyl, Digital download	—

== Singles ==
=== As lead artist ===
List of singles, with selected chart positions, showing year released and album name
Title	Year	Peak chart positions		Album
Title	Year	UK	US AAA	Album
"My Manic and I"	2007	—	—	My Manic and I
"New Romantic"	2007	—	—	My Manic and I
"Ghosts"	2007	108	—	Alas, I Cannot Swim
"Cross Your Fingers"	2008	113	—	Alas, I Cannot Swim
"Night Terror"	2008	—	—	Alas, I Cannot Swim
"Goodbye England (Covered in Snow)"	2009	133	—	I Speak Because I Can
"Devil's Spoke"	2010	97	—	I Speak Because I Can
"Rambling Man"	2010	—	—	I Speak Because I Can
"Blues Run the Game"	2010	—	—	Non-album single
"Sophia"	2011	156	—	A Creature I Don't Know
"The Beast"	2013	—	—	A Creature I Don't Know
"Master Hunter"	2013	—	—	Once I Was an Eagle
"False Hope"	2015	—	—	Short Movie
"A Hard Rain's a-Gonna Fall"	2017	—	—	Non-album single
"Held Down"	2020	—	33	Song for Our Daughter
"—" denotes a recording that did not chart or was not released in that territory.

=== As featured artist ===
List of singles, showing year released and album name
Title	Year	Peak chart positions				Album
Title	Year	UK	AUT	BEL (FL)	IRL	Album
"5 Years Time" (Noah and the Whale featuring Laura Marling)	2007	7	59	72	10	Peaceful, the World Lays Me Down
"Young Love" (Mystery Jets featuring Laura Marling)	2008	34	—	—	—	Twenty One
"The Water" (Johnny Flynn featuring Laura Marling)	2010	—	—	—	—	Been Listening
"Dancing in the Dark" (Eddie Berman featuring Laura Marling)	2013	—	—	—	—	Blood & Rust
"Take This Body" (Gill Landry featuring Laura Marling)	2015	—	—	—	—	Gill Landry
"Cloak of the Night" (Ed O'Brien (as EOB) featuring Laura Marling)	2020	—	—	—	—	Earth
"Tough Love" (Flyte featuring Laura Marling)	2023	—	—	—	—	Flyte

=== Promotional singles ===
List of promotional singles, showing year released and album name
Title	Year	Album
"All My Rage"	2012	A Creature I Don't Know
"Bonny Portmore"	2014	Turn: Washington's Spies
"Bron-Yr-Aur"	2015	Mojo
