= Glastonbury Festival 2017 =

Music festival in England

- Date: 21 June 2017 – 25 June 2017
- Locations: Worthy Farm, Pilton, Somerset, England
- Previous event: Glastonbury Festival 2016
- Next event: Glastonbury Festival 2019
- Website: www.glastonburyfestivals.co.uk

The 2017 Glastonbury Festival of Contemporary Performing Arts took place between 21 and 25 June. The three headlining acts were Radiohead, Foo Fighters, and Ed Sheeran, with Barry Gibb performing in the iconic Legend's Slot.

== Tickets ==
General Admission Tickets for the festival cost £238 for the full weekend.

== Weather ==
The weather was around 30 °C on 21 June with temperatures potentially reaching 10 °C higher than usual for the festival.

== Line-up ==
Headlining the festival were Radiohead, Foo Fighters and Ed Sheeran on the Friday, Saturday and Sunday respectively. Labour Party leader Jeremy Corbyn also made an appearance on the Pyramid Stage on the Saturday.

=== Pyramid Stage ===
Pyramid Stage
Friday	Saturday	Sunday
Radiohead; 21:30 - 23:45; The xx 19:30 - 20:30; Royal Blood; 17:45 - 18:45; Kris Kristofferson^{[A]} 16:15 - 17:15; First Aid Kit; 14:45 - 15:45; Blossoms; 13:30 - 14:15; Paul Carrack; 12:15 - 13:00; Hacienda Classical - Graeme Park, Mike Pickering & Manchester Camerata Orchestra + Special Guests; 10:45 - 11:30	Foo Fighters; 21:45 - 23:45; The National; 19:45 - 20:45; Katy Perry; 18:00 - 19:00; Run the Jewels^{[C]} 16:15 - 17:15; Jeremy Corbyn; 16:00 - 16:10; Craig David; 14:45 - 15:45; Jools Holland & His Rhythm & Blues Orchestra^{[B]} 13:15 - 14:15; Vieux Farka Touré; 11:55 - 12:45; The Bootleg Beatles with The Pepperland Sinfonia; 10:45 - 11:30	Ed Sheeran; 21:45 - 23:15; Biffy Clyro; 19:30 - 20:45; Chic; 17:45 - 18:45; Barry Gibb; 16:00 - 17:15; Laura Marling; 14:15 - 15:15; Jamie Cullum; 12:45 - 13:45; Orchestra Baobab; 11:35 - 12:15; The Black Dyke Band; 10:30 - 11:30

A. Kris Kristofferson's set featured guest appearances from Johnny Depp and Margo Price.
B. Jools Holland's set featured guest appearances from Chris Difford, Louise Marshall and Ruby Turner.
C. Run the Jewels' set featured a guest appearance from DJ Shadow.

The set by Foo Fighters was notable for the televised appearance in the crowd of a naked man, to whom Dave Grohl dedicated the song "My Hero".

Actor Bradley Cooper, co-producer, director, and star of the 2018 film A Star Is Born, filmed a four-minute segment of his film with Lady Gaga on the Pyramid Stage, using part of Kris Kristofferson's set.

Pyramid Stage Set Lists
Blossoms
- 1. At Most A Kiss
- 2. Getaway
- 3. My Favourite Room
- 4. Honey
- 5. Charlemagne
First Aid Kit
- 1. Wolf
- 2. Master Pretender
- 3. Waitress Song
- 4. The Lion's Roar
- 5. You Are the Problem Here
- 6. Ghost Town
- 7. King of the World
- 8. It's a Shame
- 9. The Gambler
- 10. Stay Gold
- 11. Emmylou
- 12. My Silver Lining
Kris Kristofferson
- 1. Shipwrecked in the Eighties
- 2. Darby's Castle
- 3. Me and Bobby McGee with Margo Price
- 4. Here Comes That Rainbow Again
- 5. Best of All Possible Worlds
- 6. Help Me Make It Through the Night
- 7. Casey's Last Ride
- 8. Broken Freedom Song
- 9. Lovin' Her Was Easier (Than Anything I'll Ever Do Again)
- 10. Sing Me Back Home
- 11. Jesus Was a Capricorn
- 12. Sunday Mornin' Comin' Down with Johnny Depp
- 13. The Silver Tongued Devil and I with Johnny Depp
- 14. For the Good Times
- 15. Why Me with Margo Price
Royal Blood
- 1. Where Are You Now?
- 2. Lights Out
- 3. Come On Over
- 4. I Only Lie When I Love You
- 5. Little Monster
- 6. Hook, Line & Sinker
- 7. Hole in Your Heart
- 8. Figure It Out
- 9. Loose Change
- 10. Ten Tonne Skeleton
- 11. Out of the Black
The xx
- 1. Intro
- 2. Crystalised
- 3. Say Something Loving
- 4. Islands
- 5. Dangerous
- 6. I Dare You
- 7. Performance
- 8. Infinity
- 9. VCR
- 10. Fiction
- 11. Shelter
- 12. Loud Places
- 13. On Hold
- 14. Angels
Radiohead
- 1. Daydreaming
- 2. Lucky
- 3. Ful Stop
- 4. Airbag
- 5. 15 Step
- 6. Myxomatosis
- 7. Exit Music (For a Film)
- 8. Pyramid Song
- 9. Everything in Its Right Place
- 10. Let Down
- 11. Bloom
- 12. Weird Fishes / Arpeggi
- 13. Idioteque
- 14. You and Whose Army?
- 15. There There
- 16. Bodysnatchers
- 17. Street Spirit (Fade Out)
- 18. No Surprises
- 19. Nude
- 20. 2 + 2 = 5
- 21. Paranoid Android
- 22. Fake Plastic Trees
- 23. Lotus Flower
- 24. Creep
- 25. Karma Police
Jools Holland & His Rhythm and Blues Orchestra
- 1. Double O Boogie
- 2. Midnight Special
- 3. Just to be Home With You
- 4. Bumble Boogie
- 5. Waterloo Bridge with Louise Marshall
- 6. Plaisir d'amour
- 7. Jump For Joy
- 8. Enjoy Yourself (It's Later than You Think)
- 9. Take Me I'm Yours with Chris Difford
- 10. Cool for Cats with Chris Difford
- 11. Tuxedo Junction
- 12. Let the Good Times Roll with Ruby Turner
- 13. Rock Me with Ruby Turner
- 14. The Informer with Ruby Turner
- 15. Roll Out Of This Hole with Ruby Turner
- 16. Peace in the Valley with Ruby Turner
Craig David
- 1. Ain't Giving Up
- 2. Fill Me In
- 3. Nothing Like This
- 4. Rise & Fall
- 5. Love Yourself
- 6. 7 Days
- 7. Re-Rewind (The Crowd Say Bo Selecta)
- 8. Reload
- 9. When the Bassline Drops
- 10. No Scrubs
- 11. Who's That Girl?
- 12. Walking Away
- 13. Jump Around
- 14. One Dance
- 15. Show Me Love
- 16. One More Time
- 17. 16
Run the Jewels
- 1. Talk to Me
- 2. Legend Has It
- 3. Call Ticketron
- 4. Blockbuster Night Part 1
- 5. Oh My Darling Don't Cry
- 6. Nobody Speak with DJ Shadow
- 7. Hey Kids (Bumaye)
- 8. Panther like a Panther (I'm the Shit)
- 9. Stay Gold
- 10. Don't Get Captured
- 11. Close Your Eyes (And Count to Fuck)
- 12. Sea Legs
- 13. Lie, Cheat, Steal
- 14. Early
- 15. A Report to the Shareholders
- 16. Down
Katy Perry
- 1. Hey Hey Hey
- 2. Chained to the Rhythm
- 3. Witness
- 4. Teenage Dream
- 5. Firework
- 6. Dark Horse
- 7. E.T
- 8. Thinking of You
- 9. Save as Draft
- 10. California Gurls
- 11. I Kissed a Girl
- 12. Power
- 13. Swish Swish
- 14. Roar
The National
- 1. Sea of Love
- 2. Fake Empire
- 3. The System Only Dreams in Total Darkness
- 4. Walk It Back
- 5. Guilty Party
- 6. Day I Die
- 7. I Need My Girl
- 8. England
- 9. Bloodbuzz Ohio
- 10. Mr. November
- 11. Terrible Love
- 12. Turtleneck
Foo Fighters
- 1. Times Like These
- 2. All My Life
- 3. Learn to Fly
- 4. Something from Nothing
- 5. The Pretender
- 6. Cat Scratch Fever/Another One Bites the Dust/God Save the Queen
- 7. Cold Day In The Sun
- 8. Congregation
- 9. Walk
- 10. These Days
- 11. My Hero
- 12. Wheels
- 13. Run
- 14. This Is a Call
- 15. Arlandria
- 16. Monkey Wrench
- 17. Best of You
- 18. Skin and Bones
- 19. Under Pressure
- 20. Everlong
Jamie Cullum
- 1. The Same Things
- 2. Get Your Way
- 3. Comes Love
- 4. Don't Stop the Music
- 5. Don't You Know
- 6. Shape of You
- 7. Everybody Loves the Sunshine
- 8. Sinner Man
- 9. When I Get Famous
- 10. Mixtape
Laura Marling
- 1. Soothing
- 2. Wild Fire
- 3. The Valley
- 4. Nothing, Not Nearly
- 5. Don't Pass Me By
- 6. Sophia
- 7. Once
- 8. Salinas
- 9. Daisy
- 10. How Can I
- 11. I Speak Because I Can
- 12. Rambling Man
Barry Gibb
- 1. Jive Talkin'
- 2. You Should Be Dancing
- 3. Lonely Days
- 4. How Can You Mend a Broken Heart
- 5. To Love Somebody
- 6. Stayin' Alive
- 7. I've Gotta Get a Message to You
- 8. How Deep Is Your Love
- 9. Spicks and Specks
- 10. Guilty
- 11. Islands in the Stream
- 12. Night Fever/More Than a Woman
- 13. Nights on Broadway
- 14. Words
- 15. Tragedy
Nile Rodgers & Chic
- 1. Everybody Dance
- 2. I Want Your Love
- 3. I'm Coming Out
- 4. Upside Down
- 5. He's the Greatest Dancer
- 6. We Are Family
- 7. My Feet Keep Dancing
- 8. Get Lucky
- 9. Let's Dance
- 10. Le Freak
- 11. Good Times
Biffy Clyro
- 1. Wolves of Winter
- 2. Living Is a Problem Because Everything Dies
- 3. Sounds Like Balloons
- 4. Biblical
- 5. Howl
- 6. Who's Got a Match?
- 7. Bubbles
- 8. Re-Arrange
- 9. That Golden Rule
- 10. Black Chandelier
- 11. Medicine
- 12. Different People
- 13. Mountains
- 14. 9/15ths
- 15. Animal Style
- 16. Many of Horror
- 17. Stingin' Belle
Ed Sheeran
- 1. Castle on the Hill
- 2. Eraser
- 3. The A Team
- 4. Don't
- 5. Bloodstream
- 6. Galway Girl
- 7. Lego House
- 8. Take It Back/Superstition/Ain't No Sunshine
- 9. I'm a Mess
- 10. Photograph
- 11. Nancy Mulligan
- 12. Thinking Out Loud
- 13. Sing
- 14. Shape of You
- 15. You Need Me, I Don't Need You

=== Other Stage ===
Other Stage
Friday	Saturday	Sunday
Major Lazer; 22:30 - 23:45; Lorde; 20:45 - 21:45; George Ezra; 19:05 - 20:05; Halsey; 17:40 - 18:35; Glass Animals; 16:20 - 17:10; Circa Waves; 15:00 - 15:50; Nothing but Thieves; 13:40 - 14:30; Charli XCX; 12:25 - 13:15; The Pretenders; 11:00 - 12:00	Alt-J; 22:30 - 23:45; Stormzy; 20:30 - 21:30; Wiley; 19:15 - 20:00; Liam Gallagher; 17:45 - 18:45; Kaiser Chiefs; 16:15 - 17:15; Wild Beasts; 14:45 - 15:45; British Sea Power; 13:15 - 14:15; Whitney; 12:05 - 12:50; Gabrielle Aplin; 11:00 - 11:45	Boy Better Know; 22:15 - 23:15; Emeli Sandé; 20:35 - 21:25; Courteeners; 18:55 - 19:55; Haim; 17:35 - 18:25; Kodaline; 16:15 - 17:05; Rag'n'Bone Man; 14:55 - 15:45; Dropkick Murphys; 13:35 - 14:25; Deaf Havana; 12:15 - 13:05; Slaves; 11:00 - 11:45

=== West Holts Stage ===
West Holts Stage
Friday	Saturday	Sunday
Dizzee Rascal; 22:30 - 23:40; Anderson Paak & The Free Nationals; 20:45 - 21:45; Little Dragon; 19:15 - 20:15; Kae Tempest; 17:45 - 18:45; Pat Thomas & The Kwashibu Area Band; 16:15 - 17:15; Ata Kak; 14:45 - 15:45; Henry Wu Presents The Kamaal Williams Ensemble; 13:30 - 14:15; Hot 8 Brass Band; 12:00 - 13:00	The Jacksons; 22:15 - 23:45; Solange; 20:30 - 21:30; The Avalanches; 19:00 - 20:00; Toots & The Maytals; 17:30 - 18:30; BadBadNotGood; 16:00 - 17:00; Thundercat; 14:30 - 15:30; Afriquoi; 13:00 - 14:00; Khruangbin; 11:30 - 12:30	Justice; 22:00 - 23:15; Moderat; 20:15 - 21:15; The Cinematic Orchestra; 18:45 - 19:45; Shaggy; 17:15 - 18:15; Oumou Sangaré; 15:45 - 16:45; Yorkston/Thorne/Khan; 14:15 - 15:15; Ryley Walker; 12:45 - 13:45; House Gospel Choir; 11:30 - 12:30

=== John Peel Stage ===
John Peel Stage
Friday	Saturday	Sunday
Annie Mac; 22:30 - 23:45; Clean Bandit; 21:00 - 22:00; Future Islands; 19:30 - 20:30; Ride; 18:10 - 19:00; Declan McKenna; 16:50 - 17:40; The Lemon Twigs; 15:30 - 16:20; Dua Lipa; 14:10 - 15:00; Black Honey; 13:00 - 13:40; Rews; 12:00 - 12:40; DAM; 11:00 - 11:40	Phoenix; 22:30 - 23:45; Father John Misty; 21:00 - 22:00; DJ Shadow; 19:30 - 20:30; Tove Lo; 18:10 - 19:00; Loyle Carner; 16:50 - 17:40; Cabbage; 15:30 - 16:20; The Amazons; 14:10 - 15:00; Inheaven; 13:00 - 13:40; Maggie Rogers; 12:00 - 12:40; Josh Barry; 11:00 - 11:40	Metronomy; 22:00 - 23:15; London Grammar; 20:30 - 21:30; Goldfrapp; 19:00 - 20:00; The Killers (Secret Set); 17:30 - 18:30; Frank Carter & The Rattlesnakes; 16:00 - 17:00; King Gizzard and the Lizard Wizard; 14:30 - 15:30; Real Estate; 13:00 - 14:00; Sundara Karma; 11:50 - 12:30; October Drift; 11:00 - 11:30

== Glastonbury Festival 2018 ==
Festival founder Michael Eavis announced on 26 June 2017 that there would be no Glastonbury 2018 in order to give "the farm, the village, and the festival team the traditional year off" until Glastonbury Festival 2019. The previous "fallow year" was in 2012.
