= Animalism =

Animalism may refer to:

- Animalism (philosophy), the notion that humans are animals
- Animalism (movement), a social movement that views non-human animals as worthy of moral and ethical consideration
- Animalism (album), a 1966 album by The Animals
- Animalism (Animal Farm), an allegory for communism featured in the book Animal Farm

== See also ==
- Animal (disambiguation)
- Animality (disambiguation)
- Animalist, a network under Discovery Digital Networks based upon animal-themed video content
- Animism (disambiguation)
