= Pete Roe =

- Born: 20 July 1981 (age 45)
- Origin: London and Bristol, England
- Genres: Contemporary folk, folk rock
- Occupation: Singer-songwriter
- Instruments: Vocals, guitar, piano, harmonium
- Labels: Middle of Nowhere, Communion
- Website: peteroe.org

Pete Roe (born 20 July 1981) is an English folk singer-songwriter based in London, England. He was formerly a member of Laura Marling's band and has also toured with Mumford and Sons, Lucy Rose, Nathaniel Rateliff, Willy Mason and Ben Howard, He has been compared to Bert Jansch, and been described by NME as the missing link between John Martyn and Leonard Cohen.

== Biography ==
Pete Roe was born in London and studied mechanical engineering at the University of Bristol. In 2007, he moved to London and joined as session musician in Laura Marling's band. Between 2008 and 2010, he recorded on Marling's Mercury Music Prize nominated albums I Speak Because I Can and A Creature I Don't Know as well as being the second signing to Communion Records in the summer of 2010. The EP The Merry-Go-Round received critical acclaim: opening track "Bellina" was awarded Song of the Day status by Q magazine, and Roe named an up-and-coming star by The Guardian's influential music section. In 2012, he produced folk-rock band Hot Feet's debut EP, Wood House.

Roe's 2013 album, Our Beloved Bubble, was recorded at Watercolour Studios in the highlands of Scotland in only a few days. It was mixed by Ethan Johns, mastered at Abbey Road Studios and released by Middle of Nowhere. Our Beloved Bubble was described by Q as sounding "Like a lost 70s John Martyn classic" and Bob Harris called it "A lovely record"

Pete Roe is a tuner and restorer of harmoniums and reed organs

Between 2013 and 2015, Roe designed and developed a guitar pickup called the Submarine that lets the player apply effects to two strings of a guitar, thereby making one guitar sound like two.

== Pete Roe discography ==
- Propeller (2006)
- Animals EP (2007)
- The Merry-Go-Round (2010)
- Circles (2012)
- Our Beloved Bubble (2013)
