= Animalia (disambiguation) =

Animalia is the taxonomic kingdom comprising all animals.

Animalia may also refer to:

- Animalia (book), a 1986 children's book by Graeme Base
- Animalia (TV series), an Australian children's program based on the book
- Animalia (film), a 2023 French-Moroccan science-fiction film
- Animalia (character), a Marvel Comics mutant character

== See also ==
- Animal (disambiguation)
- Animality (disambiguation)
