= Anymal =

Anymal may refer to:

- The Anymal, a 2019 album by Suchmos
- Anymal, a robot created by Swiss company ANYbotics
- Anymal, a term coined by ethicist Lisa Kemmerer to non-human animals

== See also ==
- Animal (disambiguation)
