= Hope We Meet Again =

Hope We Meet Again may refer to:

- "Hope We Meet Again", a 2012 song by Pitbull featuring Chris Brown from Global Warming
- "Hope We Meet Again", a 2020 song by Laura Marling from Song for Our Daughter
