= Ghosts (Laura Marling song) =

Single by Laura Marling

from the album Alas, I Cannot Swim
- Released: December 2, 2007
- Recorded: 2007
- Genre: Singer/Songwriter
- Length: 3:02
- Label: Virgin Records
- Songwriter(s): Laura Marling

Laura Marling singles chronology
| "New Romantic" (2017) | "Ghosts" (2007) | "Cross Your Fingers" (2008) |

"Ghosts" is the debut single by Laura Marling. It was released on December 2, 2007 as the lead single from her debut album Alas, I Cannot Swim. The song peaked at number 108 on the UK Singles Chart. It was voted in at #43 on Triple J Hottest 100, 2008.

== Music video ==
A music video to accompany the release of "Ghosts" was first released onto YouTube on 12 March 2009 at a total length of three minutes and three seconds.

== Track listing ==
Digital download
| No. | Title | Length |
|---|---|---|
| 1. | "Ghosts" | 3:02 |

== Chart performance ==
| Chart (2007) | Peak position |
|---|---|
| UK Singles (The Official Charts Company) | 108 |

== Release history ==
| Country | Release date | Format(s) |
|---|---|---|
| United Kingdom | December 2, 2007 | Digital download |
