= Song for Our Daughter =

Studio album by Laura Marling
- Released: 10 April 2020
- Studios: Marling's home studio, London; Monnow Valley Studio, Wales; Ethan Johns' Three Crows studio
- Genre: Folk
- Length: 36:29
- Labels: Chrysalis; Partisan
- Producers: Laura Marling; Ethan Johns

Laura Marling chronology
Semper Femina (2017)	Song for Our Daughter (2020)	Patterns in Repeat (2024)

Singles from Song for Our Daughter
- 1. "Held Down" Released: 5 April 2020

Song for Our Daughter is the seventh studio album by British singer-songwriter Laura Marling. It was released on 10 April 2020. It was co-produced by Marling with longtime collaborator Ethan Johns. The album's title is figurative, with Marling writing to a fictional daughter.

Song for Our Daughter was shortlisted for the 2020 Mercury Prize and was nominated for Best Folk Album at the 63rd Annual Grammy Awards.

== Background and themes ==
Marling described the album as "stripped of everything that modernity and ownership does to it... essentially a piece of me". The songs are written to an imaginary child, with Marling stating it allowed her to offer her "all the confidences and affirmations I found so difficult to provide myself". Marling was inspired by Maya Angelou's book Letter to My Daughter (2009), which she read a few years before the album's release. Marling, however, later gave birth to a daughter in 2023.

== Writing and recording ==
The songs on the album were all written by Marling. However, the title track and "For You" feature additional songwriting by George Jephson, while "The End of the Affair" features additional songwriting by Blake Mills, who produced Marling's previous album Semper Femina (2017).

The songs were demoed in Marling's basement studio in her home in London. The album was co-produced by Marling with longtime collaborator Ethan Johns and was primarily recorded at Monnow Valley Studio. Johns previously produced Marling's albums I Speak Because I Can (2010), A Creature I Don't Know (2011) and Once I Was an Eagle (2013). The album was mixed by Ethan Johns and by Dom Monks, who previously completed engineering on I Speak Because I Can, engineering on A Creature I Don't Know, as well as recording and additional production on Once I Was an Eagle. Additional recording and mixing were done at Ethan Johns' Three Crows studio.

== Music and lyrics ==
Compared to her previous album, Song for Our Daughter features more sparse and starkly minimal arrangements to create an intimate sound. Laura Marling's vocals are accompanied mostly by acoustic guitar and light percussion, but are backed at times by piano and string arrangements. The string arrangements were arranged by Rob Moose. Marling also employs intricate harmony vocals on the album, including her layered vocal harmonies on "Held Down".

"Alexandra" was inspired by Leonard Cohen's song "Alexandra Leaving". Marling's song is about her fascination with Cohen's attitudes towards women. In an interview with Far Out Magazine, she explained, "He writes about women in such a beautiful way. It doesn't aggravate me that he lived the way he wanted to live. In fact, I think it's very brave of people to live that way." "Only the Strong" borrows a line from Robert Icke's adaptation of the Schiller play Mary Stuart, which Marling wrote the music for. The song "Hope We Meet Again" was originally written for the play's haunting finale; Varsity's Maya Yousif wrote that even when "devoid of its theatrical context, the track glimmers; the acoustic and pedal steel guitar combining to produce notes of hopefulness and loneliness to a chilling effect". "Blow by Blow" is a piano ballad written in homage to Paul McCartney. "Song for Our Daughter" was influenced by Marling's recent studies in psychoanalysis and concerns "innocence being taken away prematurely" and preparing "the next generation in a way that you weren't". "Fortune" is about a powerless woman unable to escape her circumstance, and is inspired by Marling's mother's "running away fund" that she has never used. "The End of the Affair" is about the "infinite" nature of love and the "idea of a private mourning of love" which cannot be shared. The song's title is a reference to Graham Greene's novel of the same name. "For You" is a love song inspired by McCartney, and features Marling's boyfriend playing guitar. It was recorded at home "on the fly" on her laptop and is included on the album in its original demo form.

== Release ==
The album was initially scheduled for an August 2020 release, however the date was moved forward to 10 April 2020 due to the COVID-19 pandemic. Marling herself commented on this, stating she "saw no reason to hold back on something that, at the very least, might entertain, and at its best, provide some sense of union". "Held Down" was released as a single on 5 April 2020, alongside the album's announcement. The album was released physically (on CD and both standard and marbled vinyl LP) on 10 July 2020.

== Critical reception ==
Professional ratings
Aggregate scores
Source	Rating
AnyDecentMusic?	8.6/10
Metacritic	88/100
Review scores
Source	Rating
AllMusic	4/5 stars
Clash	8/10
The Daily Telegraph	5/5 stars
The Guardian	4/5 stars
The Independent	5/5 stars
Mojo	4/5 stars
NME	5/5 stars
The Observer	4/5 stars
Pitchfork	7.6/10
Uncut	8/10

Song for Our Daughter was met with widespread critical acclaim. At Metacritic, which assigns a normalised rating out of 100 from reviews from professional critics, the album received a score of 88, based on 20 reviews. According to Metacritic, it was the 9th best-reviewed album of 2020. Aggregator AnyDecentMusic? gave it 8.6 out of 10, based on their assessment of the critical consensus.

Ella Kemp of NME called the album "a graceful ode to resilience... it's an absolute triumph". Alexis Petridis of The Guardian described it as being "alternately intimate, sneering and sad, and lavished with gorgeous melodies"; it was ultimately named album of the week. Neil McCormick of The Daily Telegraph called the album Marling's "most measured and mature work" and praised her "skillful guitar playing" and "exquisite" harmonies. In a perfect score review for Record Collector, Oregano Rathbone called the album "so uncannily, unreasonably and astutely beautiful that it meticulously sets aside every last one of your emotional checks and balances to wrap your core in a firm embrace." In her review for Mojo, Jude Rogers praised the album's production and Rob Moose's string arrangements, and wrote that Marling's "voice has never been better, each syllable a shining pool of water, clear, vivid and beautiful." Steven Edelstone of Paste called it "simultaneously Marling's most straightforward, musically simplistic record to date and her most beautiful release yet." Laura Stanley of Exclaim! wrote, "Marling remains at the top of her game." Tom Hull was somewhat less impressed, saying Marling has "never sounded more like Joni Mitchell, although my favorite Mitchell albums have a bit more spunk."

In the review for AllMusic, Timothy Monger claimed that "At just 30 years old and with seven albums to her credit, Marling's songwriting has been honed to a level of literate maturity that few artists achieve in their careers."

=== Year-end lists ===
Year-end list accolades for Song for Our Daughter
Publication	List	Rank	Ref.
Clash	Albums of the Year 2020	18	
Double J	The 50 best albums of 2020	7	
Esquire (UK)	The 50 Best Albums of 2020	50	
Gigwise	51 Best Albums of 2020	29	
The Guardian	The 50 best albums of 2020	27	
The Independent	The 40 best albums of 2020	4	
Jutarnji list	The Best Foreign Albums of 2020	19	
Mojo	The 75 Best Albums of 2020	17	
musicOMH	Top 50 Albums of 2020	21	
NME	The 50 best albums of 2020	25	
NBHAP	50 Best Albums of 2020	50	
Paste	The 25 Best Albums of 2020 (So Far)	13	
Stereogum	The 50 Best Albums of 2020	25	
Uncut	The Top 75 Albums of the Year	10	
Under the Radar	Top 100 Albums of 2020	18	

=== Awards and nominations ===
Awards and nominations for Song for Our Daughter
Organisation	Year	Award	Result	Ref.
British Phonographic Industry	2020	Mercury Prize	Nominated	
Grammy Awards	2021	Best Folk Album	Nominated	
Ivor Novello Awards	2021	Best Album	Nominated	

== Track listing ==
All tracks are written by Laura Marling, except where noted.

Song for Our Daughter track listing
No.	Title	Writer(s)	Length
1.	"Alexandra"		3:19
2.	"Held Down"		4:07
3.	"Strange Girl"		3:21
4.	"Only the Strong"		3:20
5.	"Blow by Blow"		2:55
6.	"Song for Our Daughter"	Marling; George Jephson^{[a]}	4:06
7.	"Fortune"		3:55
8.	"The End of the Affair"	Marling; Blake Mills^{[a]}	3:24
9.	"Hope We Meet Again"		4:05
10.	"For You"	Marling; George Jephson^{[a]}	3:57
Total length:			36:29

Notes

- ^{^[a]} signifies an additional songwriter

== Personnel ==
Credits adapted from the album's liner notes.

- Laura Marling – vocals, acoustic guitar, electric guitar, güiro, slide guitar, production
- Ethan Johns – drums, continuum fingerboard, resonator guitar, shaker, Moog, production, mixing
- Nick Pini – bass, bowed double bass
- Dan See – drums
- Anna Corcoran – piano
- Chris Hillman – pedal steel guitar
- Gabriela Cabezas – cello
- Dom Monks – loops, mixing
- Rob Moose – string arrangements
- Edie Phillips – recording assistant (Monnow)
- Justin Tyler Close – photography
- Vance Wellenstein – graphic design
- Theresa Adebiyi – creative direction

== Charts ==
Chart performance for Song for Our Daughter
Chart (2020)	Peak position
Belgian Albums (Ultratop Flanders)	86
Dutch Albums (Album Top 100)	61
German Albums (Offizielle Top 100)	80
Portuguese Albums (AFP)	27
Scottish Albums (Official Charts)	3
Swiss Albums (Schweizer Hitparade)	78
UK Albums (Official Charts)	6
US Top Current Album Sales (Billboard)	89

== See also ==
- List of UK Album Downloads Chart number ones of the 2020s
- List of UK Independent Albums Chart number ones of 2020
- List of UK top-ten albums in 2020
