= Cross Your Fingers =

Single by Laura Marling

from the album Alas, I Cannot Swim
- Released: June 8, 2008
- Recorded: 2008
- Genre: Folk
- Length: 2:23
- Label: Virgin Records
- Songwriter(s): Laura Marling

Laura Marling singles chronology
"Ghosts" (2007)	"Cross Your Fingers" (2008)	"Night Terror" (2008)

"Cross Your Fingers" is a single by Laura Marling. It was released on June 8, 2008, as the second single from her debut album Alas, I Cannot Swim. The song peaked at number 113 on the UK Singles Chart.

== Music video ==
A music video to accompany the release of "Cross Your Fingers" was first released onto YouTube on February 28, 2009. The video includes both "Cross Your Fingers" and "Interlude (Crawled Out of the Sea)", which the former track segues into on Alas, I Cannot Swim

== Track listing ==
Digital download
No.	Title	Length
1.	"Cross Your Fingers" (Single Version)	3:41
2.	"Blackberry Stone" (Demo)	2:40

== Chart performance ==
Chart (2008)	Peak position
UK Singles (The Official Charts Company)	113

== Release history ==
Country	Release date	Format(s)
United Kingdom	June 8, 2008	Digital download
