= Animism (disambiguation) =

Animism is the belief that all objects, places, and creatures possess a distinct spiritual essence.

Animism may also refer to:

- Animism (TV series), a 2013 Canadian animated series and a related online game
- Animism (album), a 2014 album by Tanya Tagaq

== See also ==
- Animeism, a Japanese network programming block
- Animalism (disambiguation)
