= Animality =

Animality may refer to:

- The essence of animals
- Animality studies, an academic field focused on the cultural study of animals
- Animality, a variant of the Fatality in the Mortal Kombat video games

== See also ==
- Animal (disambiguation)
- Animalia (disambiguation)
