= Devil's Spoke =

Single by Laura Marling

from the album I Speak Because I Can
- Released: March 12, 2010
- Recorded: 2009–10
- Genre: Singer/Songwriter
- Length: 2:58
- Label: Virgin Records
- Songwriter(s): Laura Marling

Laura Marling singles chronology
"Goodbye England (Covered in Snow)" (2009)	"Devil's Spoke" (2010)	"Rambling Man" (2010)

"Devil's Spoke" is a single by Laura Marling. It was released on March 12, 2010, as the second single from her second album I Speak Because I Can. The song peaked at number 97 on the UK Singles Chart.

== Music video ==
A music video accompanying the release of "Devil's Spoke" with a total length of two minutes and fifty-eight seconds was first released onto YouTube on 13 February 2010.

== Track listing ==
Digital download
No.	Title	Length
1.	"Devil's Spoke" (Radio Edit)	2:58
2.	"Devil's Spoke"	3:38
3.	"Hope In the Air" (Live from the Royal Festival Hall)	4:52

== Chart performance ==
Chart (2010)	Peak position
UK Singles (The Official Charts Company)	97

== Release history ==
Country	Release date	Format(s)
United Kingdom	March 12, 2010	Digital download
