= Goodbye England (Covered in Snow) =

Single by Laura Marling

from the album I Speak Because I Can
- Released: December 11, 2009
- Recorded: 2008
- Genre: Folk
- Length: 3:46
- Label: Virgin Records
- Songwriter(s): Laura Marling

Laura Marling singles chronology
"Night Terror" (2008)	"Goodbye England (Covered in Snow)" (2009)	"Devil's Spoke" (2010)

"Goodbye England (Covered in Snow)" is a single by Laura Marling. It was released on December 11, 2009 as the lead single from her second album I Speak Because I Can. The song peaked to number 133 on the UK Singles Chart. The song was also used in the episode of the British series Beyond Paradise (TV series), season 3, episode 1, Christmas special 2024 at the end of the episode.

== Track listing ==
Digital download
No.	Title	Length
1.	"Goodbye England (Covered in Snow)"	3:46

== Chart performance ==
Chart (2009)	Peak position
UK Singles (The Official Charts Company)	133

== Release history ==
Country	Release date	Format(s)
United Kingdom	December 11, 2009	Digital download
