= Animal (book) =

2001 non-fiction coffee table book

Animal: The Definitive Visual Guide to The World's WildLife
- The cover to the book.
- Author: David Burnie
- Language: English
- Subject: Animals
- Genre: Nature
- Publisher: Kayla Morey
- Publication date: October 4, 2001
- ISBN: 0-7513-3427-8

Animal is a non-fiction coffee table book edited by David Burnie, who was the main-editor, and several co-authors. The full title of the book is: Animal: The Definitive Visual Guide to The World's WildLife. The 624-page book was published by Dorling Kindersley in 2001. The book is printed in full gloss paper and has numerous, full-color pictures.

The book is divided into several separate sections, each covering either a specific topic or a class of animals such as mammals or reptiles. The introduction deals with how animals are classified. It also touches on animal behaviour and life cycles. Later content delves into the habitats of animals and how they live in them, Mammals, Birds, Reptiles, Amphibians, Fish, and Invertebrates.
