= Animal (Lump album) =

2021 studio album by Lump

Studio album by Lump
- Released: 30 July 2021
- Studio: Mike Lindsay's home studio (Margate, Kent)
- Genre: Art pop; folktronica; retro-electro; baroque pop; alternative dance; indie folk
- Length: 44:25
- Label: Chrysalis; Partisan
- Producer: Mike Lindsay

Lump chronology
Lump (2018)	Animal (2021)

Animal is the second studio album by British musical duo Lump, composed of singer Laura Marling and producer Mike Lindsay. It was released on 30 June 2021 by Chrysalis and Partisan.

== Background and recording ==
Lump was formed in June 2016 after singer-songwriter Laura Marling and Mike Lindsay of folktronica group Tunng met at a Neil Young concert. Both were mutual fans of each other's work and they promptly began making music together, culminating in a self-titled debut which was released in 2018 to strong critical reception. The duo "had no idea" if they would make a second Lump album, but were pleased by the project's potential for further exploration and expansion, as well as its independence from the music they were best known for. Recording began in spring 2019, with Marling coming to Lindsay's home studio in Margate, Kent every two weeks between May and November of that year. Like their debut, Lindsay served as lead composer and musical director, while Marling provided vocal melodies and lyrics.

== Composition ==
According to Ben Cohn of Beats Per Minute, the album is a "robust synthesis" of both acoustic and digital musical genres, notably baroque pop, alternative dance and indie folk. Nonetheless, Lindsay tried not to use the acoustic elements "obviously related" to his work with Tunng and Marling's solo work. The New Statesman's Ellen Peirson-Hagger considered its music to be art pop with tendencies towards electropop, while Kevin Harley of Record Collector and Alex Rigotti of Gigwise described it as retro-electro and folktronica respectively. Lindsay aimed to capture a "vintage and late '70s flavour" for the sound of the record, but avoided replicating the sound of individual influences, instead "subliminally trying to channel those things".

== Critical reception ==
Professional ratings
Aggregate scores
Source	Rating
AnyDecentMusic?	7.6/10
Metacritic	82/100
Review scores
Source	Rating
DIY	4/5 stars
The Independent	3/5 stars
The Irish Times	4/5 stars
The Line of Best Fit	9/10
NME	4/5 stars
The Skinny	5/5 stars

At Metacritic, which assigns a normalized rating out of 100 to reviews from mainstream critics, the album has an average score of 82, based on 8 critical reviews, indicating "universal acclaim".

== Track listing ==
All track are written by Laura Marling and Mike Lindsay and produced by Mike Lindsay.

Animal track listing
No.	Title	Length
1.	"Bloom at Night"	5:20
2.	"Gamma Ray"	5:27
3.	"Animal"	4:37
4.	"Climb Every Wall"	4:38
5.	"Red Snakes"	4:38
6.	"Paradise"	4:34
7.	"Hair on the Pillow"	1:41
8.	"We Cannot Resist"	4:46
9.	"Oberon"	2:09
10.	"Phantom Limb"	6:35
Total length:		44:25

== Charts ==
Chart performance for Animal
Chart (2021)	Peak position
Scottish Albums (OCC)	22
UK Albums (OCC)	65
