= Patterns in Repeat =

Studio album by Laura Marling
- Released: 25 October 2024
- Studios: Marling's home studio, London; Bert Jansch Studio, London; Smilo Sound, New York
- Length: 36:20
- Labels: Chrysalis; Partisan
- Producers: Laura Marling; Dom Monks

Laura Marling chronology
Song for Our Daughter (2020)	Patterns in Repeat (2024)	Laura Sings Raffi (2026)

Singles from Patterns in Repeat
- 1. "Patterns" Released: 10 July 2024; 2. "No One's Gonna Love You Like I Can" Released: 21 August 2024; 3. "Child of Mine" Released: 24 September 2024

Patterns in Repeat is the eighth studio album by British singer-songwriter Laura Marling, released by Chrysalis Records and Partisan Records on 25 October 2024. Marling co-produced the album with Dom Monks. It was supported by three singles: "Patterns", "No One's Gonna Love You Like I Can" and "Child of Mine".

== Background and recording ==
Patterns in Repeat was written after the birth of Laura Marling's daughter in 2023. The songs reflect on motherhood, ageing and the patterns that are passed down through family over generations. The album opens with the sound of a man and a woman talking, alongside a baby cooing.

It was recorded at Marling's home studio and at Bert Jansch Studio in London. Strings were recorded at Smilo Sound in Brooklyn, New York. Marling co-produced the album with Dom Monks.

== Release ==
On 10 July 2024, Marling released the single "Patterns", her first solo release in four years. She simultaneously announced a pair of residencies at London's Hackney Church and New York's Bowery Ballroom, which would begin shortly following the album's release. The single "No One's Gonna Love You Like I Can" was released on 21 August 2024. A third single, "Child of Mine", was released on 24 September 2024. The album was released on 25 October 2024 by Chrysalis Records and Partisan Records.

== Critical reception ==
Professional ratings
Aggregate scores
Source	Rating
AnyDecentMusic?	8.3/10
Metacritic	91/100
Review scores
Source	Rating
Clash	9/10
The Daily Telegraph	5/5 stars
DIY	5/5 stars
The Independent	5/5 stars
The Line of Best Fit	8/10
Mojo	4/5 stars
The Observer	5/5 stars
Pitchfork	8.3/10
Uncut	9/10

Patterns in Repeat was met with widespread critical acclaim. At Metacritic, which assigns a normalised rating out of 100 from reviews from professional critics, the album received a score of 91, based on 15 reviews.

Neil McCormick of The Daily Telegraph wrote, "Everything about this album suggests someone at peace, from the tone of voice to the smoothness of sound and transparency of lyrics. It strikes me as Marling's least ambitious yet most satisfying album, as if she has stopped trying to write self-consciously great songs and yet they still arrive, smaller but perfectly formed." John Amen of No Depression noted that "Some listeners will miss the simmer and boil of earlier sets" but concluded that "Even if some of these tracks unfurl like a dream you soon forget, the sequence as a whole points to Marling's versatility, how her experiences feed her art, and how she's committed to embodying her one and fleeting life".

=== Year-end lists ===
Select year-end rankings for Patterns in Repeat
Publication/critic	Accolade	Rank	Ref.
Mojo	75 Best Albums of 2024	41	
Rough Trade UK	Albums of the Year 2024	3	
Uncut	80 Best Albums of 2024	45	

== Track listing ==
All tracks are written by Laura Marling, except where noted.

Patterns in Repeat track listing
No.	Title	Writer(s)	Length
1.	"Child of Mine"		4:12
2.	"Patterns"		4:20
3.	"Your Girl"		3:30
4.	"No One's Gonna Love You Like I Can"		2:02
5.	"The Shadows"		3:30
6.	"Interlude (Time Passages)"		3:05
7.	"Caroline"		3:20
8.	"Looking Back"	Laura Marling; Charlie Marling	3:04
9.	"Lullaby"		2:47
10.	"Patterns in Repeat"	Laura Marling; George Jephson	4:54
11.	"Lullaby" (instrumental)		1:36
Total length:			36:20

== Personnel ==
Credits adapted from the album's liner notes.

- Laura Marling – lead vocals (1–5, 7–10), backing vocals (1–3, 5, 7–10), guitar (1–3, 5, 7–11), piano (1, 4), electric piano (3), Mellotron (1, 3, 6, 8), bass (2, 8), soft synths (6, 8), string machine (6), production, artwork
- Rob Moose – violin (1–3, 5, 7–11), viola (1–3, 5, 7–11), string arrangement (1–3, 5, 7–11), engineering
- Katt Newlon – cello (all tracks)
- Buck Meek – backing vocals (1)
- Maudie Marling – backing vocals (1, 9)
- Fred Wordsworth – horns (2)
- Harry Fausing Smith – violin (4, 10)
- Henry Rankin – viola, violin (4, 10)
- Dom Monks – synth bass (10), triangle (10), drum (10), cymbal (10), bouzouki (10), production, engineering, mixing
- Nick Pini – double bass (10)
- Matt Colton – mastering
- Tamsin Topolski – photography
- Rob Shuttleworth – design

== Charts ==
Chart performance for Patterns in Repeat
Chart (2024)	Peak position
Belgian Albums (Ultratop Flanders)	126
Irish Albums (IRMA)	85
Portuguese Albums (AFP)	109
Scottish Albums (Official Charts)	9
UK Albums (Official Charts)	13
UK Americana Albums (Official Charts)	1
UK Folk Albums (Official Charts)	1
UK Independent Albums (Official Charts)	3
