= Short Movie =

Studio album by Laura Marling
- Released: 23 March 2015
- Genres: Folk, folk rock, alternative rock
- Length: 50:06
- Label: Virgin
- Producers: Laura Marling, Matt Ingram, Dan Cox

Laura Marling chronology
Once I Was an Eagle (2013)	Short Movie (2015)	Semper Femina (2017)

Short Movie is the fifth studio album by British singer-songwriter Laura Marling, and was released on 23 March 2015. The album marks a change in style for Marling, being the first record in which she plays electric guitar as opposed to the acoustic instrumentation of her previous four records. On June 17, Marling released a deluxe version of the record, Short Movie (Director's Cut). The deluxe record included new tracks, as well as new artwork. Marling was nominated for the Best Female Solo Artist Award at the 2016 Brit Awards because of the record.

== Background, writing and production ==
Following the release of Once I Was an Eagle, Marling felt dissatisfied with the songs she had written for her fifth record. She described the attempt as "a boring afterthought [to Once I Was an Eagle.]" Following her tour in support of the previous record, she decided to turn away from music for six months, and instead invested her time in a number of different pursuits, exploring the spiritualist and mystical side of Los Angeles. This period was highly formative, and forms a large part of the subject matter on Short Movie. Marling later called the album, "The middle of a thought, rather than a conclusion," in a radio interview.

The album is a relative departure from Marling's previous four albums. It is her first self-produced record, Marling wanting to "demystify production." As well as this, Short Movie is the first of Marling's records not to have a six syllable title. Marling also added a layer of distorted, bowed, electric guitar, to the album, creating a low, dissonant sound, reminiscent of urban background noise. At times this is so quiet that it is unnoticeable, and at others is far more prominent, as in the opening track, ″Warrior″.

The record deals with Marling's feelings of solitariness and dislocation in Los Angeles. Marling has described Los Angeles as a city that rejects negative attitudes in people, and this is reflected in the sixth track, ″Don't Let Me Bring You Down″, in which she sings "Living here is a game I don't know how to play." Marling's activities in Joshua Tree are referenced when she sings "I've got us lost so I've turned us off in Joshua Tree," in the song ″Easy″, her implied exploration with psychedelics apparent in the line, "It was a bit too high for me/ I spent a month thinking I was a high desert tree." Marling describes another part of her American experience in the lead single, ″False Hope″, which is about her time in Manhattan when Hurricane Sandy struck. The title of the record comes from a meeting Marling had with a hippie in a bar in Mount Shasta. Often his response to what Marling said was, "It's a short fucking movie, man," this attitude influencing the lyrics on the title song.

Marling was also inspired by the work of Chilean filmmaker, Alejandro Jodorowsky. Part of his biography is the subject matter of ″Gurdjieff's Daughter″, in which he recounts a meeting with Renya D'Assia, the spiritualist's daughter. The opening track ″Warrior″, is also partly inspired by Jodorowsky's film, The Holy Mountain.

Marling recorded and co-produced the album in Urchin Studios, in London. She recorded with long-time cellist, Ruth de Turberville, the bassist, Nick Pini, and Noah and the Whale fiddler, Tom Hobden, with her co-producer Matt Ingram playing the drums. She requested that the string players perform blind, meaning that they only heard each track once and were given just the key of the track, before recording their parts.

== Promotion ==
Marling released the music video for the first single, Short Movie, on 17 December, when the album's release was announced. Prior to this, she performed at a number of Holiday shows, as a support or guest act. Marling released the album's second single, False Hope, on 21 January. The song received its first airing on Zane Lowe's programme on BBC Radio 1, and was followed by the official audio release. Two live videos of the songs, False Hope and I Feel Your Love, were uploaded to Marling's YouTube account as part of promotion for the record. The video version of I Feel Your Love is noticeably different from that of the album, with Marling playing electric guitar and the live version containing no strings.

In the run up to the album's release, Marling hired a number of artists to paint murals on billboards in various locations in London. The murals are based upon the album's abstract cover, with each muralist being given free rein to augment the artwork if they so chose.

On 1 April, Marling released a music video for the song, Gurdjieff's Daughter. The video is set in Marling's former home in Silverlake, LA. It is directed by Chris Perkel and Max Knight, with whom Marling worked on the short movie, 'Woman Driver'.

== Critical reception ==
Professional ratings
Aggregate scores
Source	Rating
AnyDecentMusic?	7.9/10
Metacritic	81/100
Review scores
Source	Rating
AllMusic	3.5/5 stars
The A.V. Club	B
The Daily Telegraph	5/5 stars
The Guardian	4/5 stars
The Independent	4/5 stars
NME	8/10
Pitchfork	7.4/10
Q	4/5 stars
Rolling Stone	3.5/5 stars
Spin	8/10

Like Marling's previous four records, Short Movie has achieved critical acclaim, despite achieving a less unanimously positive reception than Once I Was An Eagle. On review collation site Metacritic, the record has an aggregate score of 81 based upon 28 reviews, signifying "universal acclaim". Writing for The Daily Telegraph, Helen Brown said, "No doubts about this: Short Movie is a masterpiece". Similarly, Michael Hann of The Guardian, called Short Movie a "Slightly frayed masterpiece". Sarah Greene of Exclaim! praised Marling's songwriting, writing that "her bold statements and revelations seem more grounded in real life observations this time around, less in archetypes." Many reviewers have described Short Movie as a transitional record, marking her departure from a typically folk style to a more alternative or rock-oriented sound.

=== Accolades ===
Publication	Accolade	Year	Rank
NME	NME'S Albums of the Year 2015	2015	28
Slant Magazine	The 25 Best Albums of 2015	2015	23
The Guardian	The Best Albums of 2015	2015	26
The Telegraph	Best Albums of 2015	2015	-
Uncut	75 Best Albums of 2015	2015	44
Exclaim!	Exclaim!'s Top 10 Folk & Country Albums	2015	7
Q	Q’s Top 50 Albums Of 2015	2015	8
Mojo	20 Best Albums Of 2015 So Far	2015	-
Spin	The 50 Best Albums of 2015 So Far	2015	-
Brooklyn Magazine	The 20 Best Folk Albums Of 2015	2015	9
Newstalk	Tom Dunne's Albums of 2015	2015	-
Diffuser.fm	The 50 Best Albums of 2015	2015	37
Rough Trade	Albums of the year 2015	2015	96
Time Out	The 25 best albums of 2015	2015	10
FasterLouder	The 50 best albums of 2015	2015	19
Fopp	The best albums of 2015	2015	95

== Track listing ==
All tracks are written by Laura Marling.

No.	Title	Length
1.	"Warrior"	5:20
2.	"False Hope"	3:13
3.	"I Feel Your Love"	4:03
4.	"Walk Alone"	3:20
5.	"Strange"	3:18
6.	"Don't Let Me Bring You Down"	3:10
7.	"Easy"	3:44
8.	"Gurdjieff's Daughter"	4:22
9.	"Divine"	3:00
10.	"How Can I"	3:22
11.	"Howl"	5:06
12.	"Short Movie"	4:37
13.	"Worship Me"	3:36

=== Director's Cut tracks ===
No.	Title	Length
1.	"I Feel Your Love - Director's Cut"	2:54
2.	"Warrior - Director's Cut"	3:42
3.	"David"	3:00
4.	"Daisy"	3:06

== Charts ==
Chart (2015)	Peak position
Australian Albums (ARIA)	30
Belgian Albums (Ultratop Flanders)	40
Dutch Albums (Album Top 100)	38
Irish Albums (IRMA)	12
Scottish Albums (Official Charts)	9
UK Albums (Official Charts)	7
UK Album Downloads (Official Charts)	8
US Top Rock Albums (Billboard)	26
US Independent Albums (Billboard)	17
US Americana/Folk Albums (Billboard)	8
Chart (2017)	Peak position
UK Americana Albums (Official Charts)	12
