= Semper Femina =

Studio album by Laura Marling
- Released: 10 March 2017
- Recorded: 2016
- Genres: Folk, folk rock, alternative rock
- Length: 42:19
- Label: More Alarming Records
- Producer: Blake Mills

Laura Marling chronology
Short Movie (2015)	Semper Femina (2017)	Song for Our Daughter (2020)

Semper Femina is the sixth studio album by British singer-songwriter, Laura Marling, and was released on 10 March 2017, on More Alarming Records. The album was produced by Blake Mills. The album's title is taken from the song "Nouel".

== Themes ==
Described by Alexis Petridis of The Guardian as a "concept album about femininity and female relationships", the title Semper Femina, borrowed from the ancient poet Virgil, is an expression from a longer line of Latin poetry, which roughly translates to "woman is ever a fickle and changeable thing".

== Reception ==
Professional ratings
Aggregate scores
Source	Rating
AnyDecentMusic?	8.2/10
Metacritic	85/100
Review scores
Source	Rating
AllMusic	4.5/5 stars
The A.V. Club	A
The Daily Telegraph	4/5 stars
The Guardian	4/5 stars
The Independent	5/5 stars
NME	5/5 stars
The Observer	4/5 stars
Pitchfork	7.7/10
Q	4/5 stars
Rolling Stone	3.5/5 stars

Semper Femina received critical acclaim upon its release. At Metacritic, which assigns a normalised rating out of 100 to reviews from mainstream publications, the album received an average score of 85, based on 31 reviews.

The album earned Marling a Grammy Award for Best Folk Album nomination.

=== Accolades ===
In The Village Voice's Pazz & Jop, a poll regarding the best albums of the year as voted by more than 400 American music critics, Semper Femina tied with Valerie June's The Order of Time (2017) at the 89th spot, both LPs garnering 84 points.

Publication	Accolade	Rank	Ref.
The A.V. Club	The Best Albums of 2017 So Far	—N/a	
ABC News	50 Best Albums of 2017	31	
AllMusic	Best of 2017	—N/a	
Consequence of Sound	Top 50 Albums of 2017	27	
Digital Trends	50 Best Albums of 2017	46	
Drowned in Sound	Favourite Albums of 2017	9	
Earbuddy	100 Best Albums of 2017	74	
Esquire (UK Edition)	50 Best Albums of 2017	—N/a	
Exclaim!	Top 10 Folk and Country Albums of 2017	3	
Fopp	The Best in 2017	23	
The Guardian	The Best Albums of 2017	19	
Mojo	2017: The Best of the Year	25	
musicOMH	Top 50 Albums Of 2017	26	
Noisey	The 100 Best Albums of 2017	76	
NME	NME's Albums of the Year 2017	49	
No Ripcord	The Best Albums of 2017	34	
Paste	The 50 Best Albums of 2017	31	
Q	Best of the Best: 2017 in Music	42	
The Sydney Morning Herald	Top 20 Albums of 2017	—N/a	
Treble	The Top 50 Albums of 2017	45	
Uncut	Best Releases of 2017	21	
Under the Radar	Top 100 Albums of 2017	58	
The Village Voice	Pazz & Jop	89	

== Track listing ==
All tracks are written by Laura Marling, except for Soothing which was written by Laura Marling and Blake Mills.

No.	Title	Length
1.	"Soothing"	4:18
2.	"The Valley"	5:40
3.	"Wild Fire"	4:50
4.	"Don't Pass Me By"	5:10
5.	"Always This Way"	4:33
6.	"Wild Once"	4:23
7.	"Next Time"	4:00
8.	"Nouel"	4:53
9.	"Nothing, Not Nearly"	4:32

== Personnel ==
Musicians

- Laura Marling – vocals, guitar
- Matt Ingram – drums
- Nick Pini – bass
- Pete Randall – guitar
- Blake Mills – guitar
- Rob Moose – strings, arrangements
- Matt Chamberlain – additional drums
- Sebastian Steinberg – additional bass

== Charts ==
Chart (2017)	Peak position
Australian Albums (ARIA)	19
Austrian Albums (Ö3 Austria)	53
Belgian Albums (Ultratop Flanders)	21
Belgian Albums (Ultratop Wallonia)	153
Dutch Albums (Album Top 100)	22
French Albums (SNEP)	113
German Albums (Offizielle Top 100)	42
Irish Albums (IRMA)	9
New Zealand Heatseekers Albums (RMNZ)	5
Scottish Albums (Official Charts)	4
Swiss Albums (Schweizer Hitparade)	46
UK Albums (Official Charts)	5
US Top Album Sales (Billboard)	66
