= Animal (disambiguation) =

An animal is a multicellular, eukaryotic organism of the kingdom Animalia or Metazoa.

Animal, Animals, or The Animal may also refer to:

== People ==
- The Animal (nickname), a list of people nicknamed "The Animal" or "Animal"
- Animal Hamaguchi, a ring name of Japanese retired professional wrestler Heigo Hamaguchi (born 1947)
- Road Warrior Animal or Animal, ring names of American professional wrestler Joseph Michael Laurinaitis (1960–2020)

== Books and publications ==
- Animal (book), full title Animal: The Definitive Visual Guide to The World's WildLife
- Animal, 2012 novel by K'wan Foye
- Animal (journal), full title: Animal: An International Journal of Animal Bioscience
- Animals (novel), 2014, by Emma Jane Unsworth

== Film and television ==
=== Films ===
- Animal (1977 film), a French film (L'Animal) starring Jean-Paul Belmondo and Raquel Welch
- Animals (1998 film), an American film starring Tim Roth and Rod Steiger
- Animal (2001 film), an Argentine comedy by Sergio Bizzio with Carlos Roffé
- Animal (2005 film), an American direct-to-video action drama starring Ving Rhames and Terrance Howard
- Animal (2014 film), an American horror film starring Keke Palmer
- Animal, a 2016 drama/horror short film directed by Nayla Al Khaja
- Animal (2018 film), an Argentine film
- Animal (2023 Greek film), a 2023 Greek drama directed by Sofia Exarchou
- Animal (2023 Indian film), a 2023 Indian Hindi language action drama
- Animals (2003 film), a stand-up show written and performed by Ricky Gervais
- Animals (2012 film), a Spanish film
- Animals (2014 film), a British drama written by and starring David Dastmalchian
- Animals (2017 film), a German film
- Animals (2019 film), an Australian film
- Animals (2021 film), a psychological thriller
- Animals (2026 film), an American crime thriller directed by and starring Ben Affleck
- The Animal, a 2001 American comedy featuring Rob Schneider
- The Animals (film), a 2012 Filipino coming-of-age film by Gino M. Santos

=== Television ===
- Animal (TV series), an American nature documentary series
- Animals (American TV series), a 2016–2018 animated series
- Animals (South Korean TV series), a 2015 reality-variety show
- "Animals" (Brass Eye), a 1997 episode
- "Animals" (The Goodies), a 1980 episode
- "Animals" (Men Behaving Badly), a 1992 episode
- "Animals" (Off the Air), a 2011 episode
- "Animals" (The Vicar of Dibley), a 1994 episode
- "The Animals" (Orange Is the New Black), a 2016 episode
- Animal (audio drama), 2011, based on Doctor Who

=== Characters ===
- Animal (Muppet), from the television series The Muppet Show
- Animal, in the television series Takeshi's Castle
- Animal, played by Ken Hudson Campbell, on the TV sitcom Herman's Head
- Dennis "Animal" Price, on the TV series Lou Grant

== Music ==
=== Albums ===
- Animal (Animosity album), 2007
- Animal (Bar-Kays album), 1989
- Animal (Big Scary album), 2016
- Animal (Kesha album), 2010
- Animal (Lump album), 2021
- Animal (María Becerra album), 2021
- Animal (Motor Ace album), 2005
- Animal (Shining album), 2018
- Animals (Pink Floyd album), 1977
- Animals (This Town Needs Guns album), 2008
- The Animals (American album), by the Animals, 1964
- The Animals (British album), by the Animals, 1964
- Animal, 2009, by AutoKratz
- Animal, 2013, by Berlin
- Animal, 2008, by Far East Movement
- Animal, 1992, by France D'Amour
- Animal!, 2008, by Margot & the Nuclear So and So's

=== EPs ===
- Animals (EP) by Ryan Starx, 2013
- Animal, 2015, by Hidden in Plain View
- A.N.I.M.A.L, 2019, by John Newman

=== Performers ===
- The Animals, a British rock band
- A.N.I.M.A.L., an Argentine heavy metal band
- Animal (Nick Culmer), lead singer of the Anti-Nowhere League

=== Songs ===
==== "Animal" ====
- "Animal" (Álvaro Soler song), 2017
- "Animal" (Aurora song), 2019
- "Animal" (Benee song), 2024
- "Animal" (Conor Maynard song), 2013
- "Animal" (Def Leppard song), 1987
- "Animal" (Jebediah song), 1999
- "Animal" (Juvenile song), 2006
- "Animal" (Katseye song), 2026
- "Animal" (María Becerra and Cazzu song), 2022
- "Animal" (Miike Snow song), 2009
- "Animal" (Neon Trees song), 2010
- "Animal" (Pearl Jam song), 1994
- "Animal" (R.E.M. song), 2004
- "Animal" (R.I.O. song), 2011
- "Animal" (Trey Songz song), 2017
- "Animal" (Troye Sivan song), 2018
- "Animal", by Against Me! from New Wave, 2007
- "Animal", by Ani DiFranco from Educated Guess, 2004
- "Animal", by Anti-Nowhere League from We Are...The League, 1982
- "Animal", by Black Light Burns from Cruel Melody, 2007
- "Animal", by Brockhampton from TM, 2022
- "Animal", by Ellie Goulding from Bright Lights, 2010
- "Animal", by France D'Amour from Animal, 1992
- "Animal", by Karen O and the Kids from Where the Wild Things Are, 2009
- "Animal", by Kat DeLuna from 9 Lives, 2007
- "Animal", by Kesha from Animal, 2010
- "Animal", by Mabel from About Last Night..., 2022
- "Animal", by the Men from Open Your Heart, 2012
- "Animal", by Mindless Self Indulgence from If, 2008
- "Animal", by Mudmen from Overrated
- "Animal", by Nada Surf from You Know Who You Are, 2016
- "Animal", by Pvris from Evergreen, 2023
- "Animal", by Subhumans from Demolition War, 1981
- "Animal", by Sunhouse from Crazy On The Weekend
- "Animal", by The Kinks from To the Bone, 1994
- "Animal", by Toto from Past to Present 1977–1990, 1990
- "Animal (F**k Like a Beast)", by W.A.S.P., 1984

==== "Animals" ====
- "Animals" (Architects song), 2020
- "Animals" (Kevin Ayers song), 1980
- "Animals" (Maroon 5 song), 2014
- "Animals" (Martin Garrix song), 2013
- "Animals" (Muse song), 2012
- "Animals" (Nickelback song), 2005
- "Animals", by CocoRosie from The Adventures of Ghosthorse and Stillborn, 2007
- "Animals", by Coldplay as one of the B-sides for "Clocks", 2003
- "Animals", by Dead Poetic from Vices, 2006
- "Animals", by Talking Heads from Fear of Music, 1979
- "Animals", by The End from Elementary, 2007
- "Animals", by Todrick Hall featuring Matt Bloyd from Forbidden, 2018

==== "The Animal" ====
- "The Animal" (song), by Disturbed, 2010
- "The Animal", by Steve Vai from Passion and Warfare, 1990

== Other uses ==
- ANIMAL (computer worm), an early self-replicating computer program
- ANIMAL (image processing), an interactive software environment for image processing
- Operation Animals, a World War II Allied deception operation in Greece
- Animals (Israeli organization), an animal rights group based in Israel

== See also ==
- Animals, Animals, Animals, an American educational television series (1976–1981)
- Anymal (disambiguation)
