= A Creature I Don't Know =

Studio album by Laura Marling
- Released: 9 September 2011
- Genres: Folk, folk rock
- Length: 41:21
- Label: Virgin
- Producer: Ethan Johns

Laura Marling chronology
| I Speak Because I Can (2010) | A Creature I Don't Know (2011) | Once I Was an Eagle (2013) |

A Creature I Don't Know is the third studio album by British singer-songwriter Laura Marling, released on 9 September 2011. The album was announced in June 2011, along with a preview of a new song, featured in a video posted on Laura Marling's official YouTube channel. The first track from the album to receive radio airplay was "Sophia", on 25 July 2011 on BBC Radio 1. The "When The Bell Tolls" tour of America, Canada and England was announced on 25 July, and took place in September and October 2011 to support the album.

== Background ==
Marling began working on the album during the lull after her I Speak Because I Can 2010 tour. According to The Guardian it was an "electively [sic] solitary time in which she remembers a lot of sitting in cafés, newspaper crosswords and scrawling in notebooks before any songs took shape."

Marling started writing the material alone, and devised vocal arrangements before playing any of the songs for her band and producer. "It was quite an interesting way of doing it, because it allowed me to put my stamp on it before anybody else put their stamp on it", the singer said.

Marling has been often described as an avid reader, and some of the album's songs bear direct references to works of literature. "Salinas" was inspired by a book about John Steinbeck. "Sophia" (the ancient goddess of wisdom, sometimes seen as God's female complement) was written under the influence of Robertson Davies's philosophical novel The Rebel Angels. The album's other main topics are "love, rage, desire, family, devils, angels, devotion, betrayal and the roles women play".

== Critical reception ==
Professional ratings
Aggregate scores
| Source | Rating |
|---|---|
| AnyDecentMusic? | 8.0/10 |
| Metacritic | 82/100 |
Review scores
| Source | Rating |
| AllMusic | 3.5/5 stars |
| The Daily Telegraph | 5/5 stars |
| The Guardian | 4/5 stars |
| The Independent | 4/5 stars |
| Mojo | 4/5 stars |
| NME | 8/10 |
| Pitchfork | 7.6/10 |
| Q | 4/5 stars |
| Spin | 7/10 |
| Uncut | 4/5 stars |

Upon its release, A Creature I Don't Know received acclaim from music critics. At Metacritic it holds an aggregate score of 82 out of 100 points, indicating "universal acclaim" based on 26 professional reviews. Aggregating website AnyDecentMusic? reports a score of 8.0 based on 31 professional reviews.

According to the Q review (subtitled: "Nu-folk starlet shines ever brighter on third outing"), the immediate impression upon hearing the album "is that of growth". "The unconvincing estuary English is long gone, replaced by a womanly panoply of burrs, sighs and incantatory dips that certainly make sense of past Joni Mitchell comparisons but in truth don't adhere to any single accent", Keith Cameron writes. While "the album's first third settles into a woozy jazz ballad territory", still, "the true grit of Laura Marling prevails amid the easy listening, and ultimately saves her third album’s deep well of substance from being smothered by its equally potent reserve of style", he argues. "It's testimony to her abilities that one can imagine her carrying the orchestral glimmer just as readily as death’s head balladry. Either way, her star power remains undiminished", the reviewer concludes. The New Musical Express reviewer also marks changes in the singer's style: "Gone is Marling's pure and strident alto voice, the sturdy re-telling of the folk-pop handbook and any suspicion that she fitted seamlessly into the heart sore singer-songwriter tradition.". According to the review, "if I Speak Because I Can was a towering musical achievement, A Creature I Don't Know is an emotional triumph". "This real-life fairytale is made up of myriad difficult home truths but Marling's hejira, her flight to freedom, makes for absolutely compelling listening", Priya Elan concludes.

Speaking of possible influences, Joshua Love of Pitchfork mentions (apart from Joni Mitchell) Fairport Convention, Leonard Cohen, Fiona Apple, Tori Amos, and PJ Harvey. Yet, "Laura Marling's music feels timeless...Her songs feel divorced from time, lacking clues or signposts to indicate whether her stories and scenes might be set 500 years ago or yesterday... Often with Marling it's not entirely clear whether these songs are springing forth from a 21-year-old Englishwoman or some deathless, wandering spirit", writes the reviewer, regarding the album "...a brave artistic approach", calling Marling "an extremely commanding <performer>" and praising her "scarily impressive self-possession". This timeless quality of the album's music is being picked on by the Uncut reviewer, too. "Laura Marling was born in Hampshire in 1990... Yet she might just as easily have been born in Brooklyn in 1950, or Liverpool in the 1980. From the moment Marling emerged, aged 18, with her remarkably assured debut, Alas I Cannot Swim, her music seemed to float high above the specifics of time, age and place", writes Graeme Thomson.

The Mitchell comparison crops up in the BBC Music, The Scotsman, The Independent and The Daily Telegraph reviews, too. "...She wears her furrowed brow with a grace and stoic humour well in advance of her nu-folk peers; combining the sort of winking stoicism that was once the preserve of commie-sympathising, flinty-faced menfolk with the supple, jazzy tones of idol Joni Mitchell", writes Alex Denney of the BBC, referring to "The Beast" as a "rain-lashed monster of a tune" and calling another song, "Night After Night", a "classic, folksy pick that allows Marling's voice to revel in its own beauty". According to Telegraphs Helen Brown, "Like Mitchell, Marling started out as part of a 'new folk' scene... but has increasingly struck out alone into a starker, stranger and more jazz-inflected musical landscape. Like Mitchell, she stakes her claim to this territory with muscular, literate lyrics and idiosyncratic guitar tunings". The Irish Times calls the album "a splendid musical progression" while according to the Paste, A Creature I Don't Know is Marling's "best album yet— definitely her most musically and lyrically ambitious".

The album was named the album of the year in the iTunes rewind 2011.

Both Mojo and Uncut placed the album at number 11 on their lists of "Top 50 albums of 2011".

== Track listing ==
All songs were written by Laura Marling. ("Flicker and Fail" came from a song by Marling's father.)

1. "The Muse" – 3:40
2. "I Was Just a Card" – 3:30
3. "Don't Ask Me Why" – 3:58
4. "Salinas" – 4:37
5. "The Beast" – 5:44
6. "Night After Night" – 5:08
7. "My Friends" – 3:58
8. "Rest in the Bed" – 3:08
9. "Sophia" – 4:51
10. "All My Rage" – 2:47
11. "Flicker and Fail" (iTunes bonus track)

== Personnel ==
- Laura Marling – voice, guitar
- Pete Roe – harmonium, piano, guitar
- Ruth De Turberville – cello
- Graham Brown – double bass, electric bass
- Marcus Hamblett – banjo, electric guitar, tenor horn, mandolin
- Matt Ingram – drums

== Chart performance ==
| Chart (2011) | Peak position |
|---|---|
| Australian Albums Chart | 12 |
| Belgium Albums Chart (Flanders) | 36 |
| Canadian Albums Chart | 77 |
| Dutch Albums Chart | 72 |
| Irish Albums Chart | 8 |
| Swiss Albums Chart | 92 |
| UK Albums Chart | 4 |

=== Certifications ===
| Country | Certifier | Certification | Sales |
|---|---|---|---|
| United Kingdom | BPI | Gold | 100,000+ |

== Release history ==
| Region | Date | Format | Label |
|---|---|---|---|
| Australia | 9 September 2011 | Digital download | Virgin Records |
| Ireland | 9 September 2011 | Digital download | Virgin Records |
| United Kingdom | 9 September 2011 | Digital download | Virgin Records |
| New Zealand | 9 September 2011 | Digital download | Virgin Records |
