= Once I Was an Eagle =

Studio album by Laura Marling
- Released: 27 May 2013
- Recorded: 2012
- Studios: Third Crow Studio, Bath, England
- Genres: Folk, folk rock
- Length: 63:20
- Label: Virgin
- Producer: Ethan Johns

Laura Marling chronology
A Creature I Don't Know (2011)	Once I Was an Eagle (2013)	Short Movie (2015)

Singles from Once I Was An Eagle
- 1. "Master Hunter" Released: 16 April 2013

Once I Was an Eagle is the fourth studio album by British singer-songwriter Laura Marling, and was released on 27 May (US/Canada, 28 May) 2013. "Master Hunter" was the album's first official single release. It was nominated for the 2013 Mercury Prize. The record achieved unanimous critical acclaim, and has been cited as one of the best singer-songwriter records of the 21st century.

== History ==
=== Background and production ===
Marling began debuting songs from Once I Was An Eagle, as early as mid-late 2011, before the release of her third album, A Creature I Don't Know. These songs included "I Was An Eagle", "Pray For Me" and "Master Hunter". The album, according to Marling, is the "plain[est]" album she has written. She has commented that it follows a central figure, who angrily shuns naïvety and love, and over the course of the album regains a "second naïvety". The album is written in three tunings, which mark the basic changes in emotion. The first half ("Take The Night Off" to "Devil's Resting Place") has a darker, more melancholic tone, whereas the second half ("Undine" to "Saved These Words") has a more upbeat and open tone, if not jubilant. Marling has stated that there is a greater cohesion to Once I Was An Eagle, in terms of themes and the development of the music. Many critics have noted that the first half feels more like a continuous idea, intensified by the first four songs ("Take The Night Off", "I Was An Eagle", "You Know" and "Breathe") which flow together as one.

Following the conclusion of her tour for her previous album, Marling began production on her fourth album. Unlike her previous three albums, she chose not to work with a band, and instead she enlisted the help of producer Ethan Johns and cellist, Ruth de Turberville, to assist with the album's production. Marling recorded the album in 10 days at Three Crows studio in Bath, England. The guitar and vocals were recorded live in one take. The album is considerably longer than her previous efforts, with sixteen tracks, and running in at over an hour.

=== Promotion ===
The album was announced on 8 March 2013, along with a streaming of "Where Can I Go?" on Laura Marling's official SoundCloud page.

Long time collaborators, Fred & Nick, created an 18-minute film called When Brave Bird Saved, written and directed by the pair, which was a "visual introduction" to the first four songs on the album, "Take The Night Off", "I Was an Eagle", "You Know" and "Breathe". The four songs seamlessly flow into one another, much like "Don't Ask Me Why" and "Salinas" on Marling's previous album, A Creature I Don't Know. The name from the film is derived from the titles of the last four songs on the album, "When Were You Happy? (And How Long Has That Been)", "Love Be Brave", "Little Bird", and "Saved These Words".

"Master Hunter" premiered on Zane Lowe's BBC Radio 1 show on 16 April 2013. Marling performed stripped-back versions of "Master Hunter" and "Once" on Later...with Jools Holland on 26 April 2013.

To promote the album in North America, Marling embarked on a small tour leading up to the album's release. "Where Can I Go?" was sent to North American Triple-A radio on 20 May 2013.

One week prior to its official release, the album was available for streaming exclusively on The Guardian and NPR on 20 May 2013.

Marling collaborated with Secret Cinema for 18 dates on an event known as the Eagle Ball. Reception was extremely positive.

=== Critical reception ===
Professional ratings
Aggregate scores
Source	Rating
AnyDecentMusic?	8.3/10
Metacritic	86/100
Review scores
Source	Rating
AllMusic	3.5/5 stars
The A.V. Club	A−
The Daily Telegraph	5/5 stars
The Guardian	4/5 stars
The Independent	5/5 stars
NME	9/10
Pitchfork	8.1/10
Q	4/5 stars
Rolling Stone	3.5/5 stars
Spin	8/10

The album received widespread critical acclaim. According to review aggregator website Metacritic, Once I Was an Eagle received an average score of 86 out of 100, based on 36 reviews, indicating universal acclaim. Aggregating website AnyDecentMusic? assigned a rating of 8.3, based on 39 reviews.

NME gave nine out of ten, calling Marling's analysis of her relationship, "forensic", and saying, "Four albums into a remarkable career in which she's yet to put a foot wrong, Marling is still waiting for her chorus. Once I Was An Eagle sets a high bar; does anyone doubt she'll soar over it?". '

Clash Magazine called it a "beautiful achievement" that confirmed Marling can "sit side-by-side with PJ, Joni and Sandy", as one of the "greatest singer-songwriters of both her generation and generations before it." The review concluded, "Without doubt, this is one of the folk albums of the year."

The Irish Times said, "whether she is softly crooning over a plucked guitar or dabbling with organs and percussion for quietly cacophonous climaxes, Marling is never less than captivating."

Slant gave the album four and a half stars out of five, and called it, "close to a masterpiece, a heavenly composition with just enough hell to keep things from feeling too familiar."

musicOMH's Matt Langham, awarding the record four and a half stars out of five, wrote: "It is a work that cements her reputation as one of the country’s leading singer-songwriters. This, of course, is a standing that’s earned and age-blind… The songs are seemingly plucked as easily as ripe fruit from a branch, but this belies their focus; it’s likely to be as powerful and unified a passage of music as you’ll hear all year."

This Is Fake DIY awarded it nine stars out of ten, and said: "Compare her to Bob Dylan all you like, but to issue a bold statement, Marling here proves herself, not as a product, but as an equal. Further down the line, it seems likely that on the emergence of another deceptively quiet young songstress with lyrics that stab and capture minds, the words on everyone’s lips will be 'this sounds like Laura Marling' instead."

The Daily Telegraph gave it five stars out of five, Neil McCormick writing, "I can’t quite pin down this album and that is one of the most appealing things about it. Her songs are liquid and amorphous, prone to shape-shifting, rarely offering up an obvious verse and chorus symmetry, or easy interpretation. Marling is never likely to be a fixture of the pop charts. But Once I Was An Eagle is a masterpiece, and, at 23, she’s still only getting started."

The Independent also awarded it five stars, saying, "As well as her most lyrically mature work, it's also the most musically satisfying. Marling and producer Ethan Johns have opted for a sparse uniformity of guitars, hand percussion and cello."

The Guardian awarded it four out of five stars, saying, "There are a couple of moments where she still feels like the sum total of a very tasteful record collection, where she struggles to make herself heard over the echoes of Joni Mitchell and Dylan's thin wild mercury sound. More often, though, she cuts through her influences, and rings out loud and clear; when she does, it's a very diverting sound indeed." The review highlighted the intensity and relentlessness of the first six-seven songs, and said of the latter half, "the quality of the songs remains almost unerringly high".

"I’m really proud of that album," Marling told Drowned in Sound in April 2015. "It might be the album I’ll be most proud of forever."

Fellow musicians paid tribute to the album. "Angry, sad, beautiful," observed Primal Scream's Bobby Gillespie. "The first five songs are like one song, though she changes the melody. I know nothing about her life but it sounds like she's had her heart broken. You don't write songs that intense for the sake of it; it comes from somewhere deep." "Once I Was an Eagle is really getting to the root of something," said Elbow's Guy Garvey. "Every time I hear Laura live, the level of authenticity in her voice is palpable." "It's her first masterpiece," enthused Paul Weller. "It's very intense. I love the really dark, thick sound Ethan Jones gets on the record."

"The best thing I've heard this year has got to be Laura Marling at the Royal Albert Hall…" said Jimmy Page. "There was something of a communion going on there, because everyone in the audience was just mesmerised by her. She did this real lengthy number that just built. You can tell that she must like Roy Harper. It was so emotional. She's a really great storyteller and she is a great guitar player. Really incredible."

Of the album itself, Page said: "I suppose you'd have to describe what she does as folk rock, but there's more to it than that. She has a storyteller's voice, plus an incredible range and technique. She also plays beautiful guitar."

=== Accolades ===
Publication	Rank	List
American Songwriter	20	American Songwriter's Top 50 Albums of 2013
The Guardian	17	The best albums of 2013
Mojo	22	MOJO's Top 50 Albums of 2013
musicOMH	80	musicOMH's Top 100 Albums of 2013
The New York Times	2	Top Ten Year-End List
NME	9	NME's 50 Best Albums of 2013
No Ripcord	7	Top 50 Albums of 2013
NPR	33	Poll Results: Listeners Pick Their Favorite Albums of 2013
PopMatters	32	The 75 Best Albums of 2013
Pretty Much Amazing	14	PMA's 40 Best Albums of 2013
Q	18	Q's 50 Albums of the Year
Rolling Stone	20	50 Best Albums of 2013
Slant	20	The 25 Best Albums of 2013
Spin	33	Spin's 50 Best Albums of 2013
Uncut	5	Uncut's Top 50 Albums of 2013
Under the Radar	16	Under the Radar's Top 125 Albums of 2013
Uncut	–	Uncut's 50 best singer-songwriter albums
Overall
Average	21.75	16 lists

== Track listing ==
All tracks are written by Laura Marling, except for "Interlude" by Ethan Johns

No.	Title	Length
1.	"Take the Night Off"	4:12
2.	"I Was an Eagle"	4:21
3.	"You Know"	2:30
4.	"Breathe"	5:00
5.	"Master Hunter"	3:16
6.	"Little Love Caster"	5:52
7.	"Devil's Resting Place"	3:14
8.	"Interlude"	2:16
9.	"Undine"	3:12
10.	"Where Can I Go?"	3:40
11.	"Once"	3:38
12.	"Pray for Me"	5:05
13.	"When Were You Happy? (And How Long Has That Been)"	3:53
14.	"Love Be Brave"	3:04
15.	"Little Bird"	5:40
16.	"Saved These Words"	4:27

== Personnel ==
- Laura Marling – voice, guitar
- Ruth de Turberville – cello
- Ethan Johns – drums, production
- Rex Horan – bass

== Chart performance ==
=== Weekly charts ===
Chart (2013)	Peak position
Australian Albums (ARIA)	12
Belgian Albums (Ultratop Flanders)	18
Belgian Albums (Ultratop Wallonia)	194
Dutch Albums (Album Top 100)	14
Norwegian Albums (VG-lista)	37
Swedish Albums (Sverigetopplistan)	46
UK Albums (Official Charts)	3
US Billboard 200	49
US Americana/Folk Albums (Billboard)	4
US Independent Albums (Billboard)	7
US Top Rock Albums (Billboard)	15
US Indie Store Album Sales (Billboard)	7

=== Year-end charts ===
Chart (2013)	Position
UK Albums (OCC)	180
US Folk Albums (Billboard)	49

As of March 2015 it has sold 31,000 copies in United States.
