= I Speak Because I Can =

Studio album by Laura Marling
- Released: 22 March 2010
- Recorded: 2009
- Genre: Folk
- Length: 36:58
- Label: Virgin
- Producer: Ethan Johns

Laura Marling chronology
| Alas, I Cannot Swim (2008) | I Speak Because I Can (2010) | A Creature I Don't Know (2011) |

I Speak Because I Can is the second studio album by British singer-songwriter Laura Marling, released on 22 March 2010.

Produced by Ethan Johns, the album deals with "responsibility, particularly the responsibility of womanhood." The album was preceded by the singles "Goodbye England (Covered in Snow)", released on iTunes in December 2009 and "Devil's Spoke" on 15 March 2010. The next single released was "Rambling Man", on 10 May 2010. The track "What He Wrote" was inspired by letters from a wife to her husband in the Second World War. On 28 March 2010, I Speak Because I Can entered the official UK Charts at #4. and has been certified Silver for sales of 60,000 in the UK. Back-up vocals are provided throughout the album by Marcus Mumford, the lead singer and guitarist of London-based folk band Mumford & Sons. These are especially prevalent on the tracks "Hope in the Air" and "I Speak Because I Can".

Early radio promos of the album contained four tracks that did not make the final commercial release. Two of these tracks, "Mama, How Far I've Come" and "Nature of Dust" were made available as a b-side to the single "Rambling Man" and an iTunes bonus track, respectively; the other two tracks, "Rebecca" and "Is A Hope" have still not seen a commercial release to date.

On the strength of the album, Marling won the Brit Award for British Female Solo Artist.

== Background and themes ==
The themes are described by Marling as being centred on the roles of women and men in society. The album is written in the first person, but is rarely autobiographical. The song, Devil's Spoke is reported by Marling as being inspired by the Odyssey, while the final track, I Speak Because I Can, is informed by Margaret Atwood's novella, The Penelopiad, a counterpoint to Homer's epic. The song, Goodbye England (Covered In Snow), according to Marling, is about a walk she and her family took to a church during winter.

== Critical reception ==
Professional ratings
Aggregate scores
| Source | Rating |
|---|---|
| AnyDecentMusic? | 8.0/10 |
| Metacritic | 81/100 |
Review scores
| Source | Rating |
| AllMusic | 4/5 stars |
| The A.V. Club | B+ |
| The Daily Telegraph | 5/5 stars |
| The Guardian | 5/5 stars |
| The Independent | 4/5 stars |
| Mojo | 4/5 stars |
| NME | 8/10 |
| Pitchfork | 8.1/10 |
| Q | 4/5 stars |
| Spin | 7/10 |

I Speak Because I Can was received with acclaim from music critics, most noting the maturity and depth of the album, as well as Marling's rich vocals. The music aggregation site, Metacritic, reported an average of 81, signifying universal acclaim. The record was listed in many end of year lists by publications, including being placed at number 8 on The Guardian's Albums of 2010. Marling won the best British solo artist at the Brit awards in 2011 for I Speak Because I Can. In 2013, NME listed the album at 263 in their list of the 500 greatest albums of all time.

== Track listing ==
All tracks by Laura Marling.

1. "Devil's Spoke" – 3:40
2. "Made by Maid" – 2:51
3. "Rambling Man" – 3:16
4. "Blackberry Stone" – 3:28
5. "Alpha Shallows" – 3:42
6. "Goodbye England (Covered in Snow)" – 3:45
7. "Hope in the Air" – 4:32
8. "What He Wrote" – 4:07
9. "Darkness Descends" – 3:40
10. "I Speak Because I Can" – 3:59
11. "Nature of Dust" – 1:29 (iTunes bonus track)

== Personnel ==
- Laura Marling – voice, guitar
- Marcus Mumford – drums
- Winston Marshall – banjo
- Ted Dwane – double bass
- Tom Hobden – fiddle
- Ruth De Turberville – cello
- Pete Roe – keyboards

== Charts and certifications ==
=== Weekly charts ===
| Chart (2010) | Peak position |
|---|---|
| Australian Albums Chart | 7 |
| Belgium Albums Chart (Flanders) | 59 |
| Dutch Albums Chart | 91 |
| Greek Albums Chart | 23 |
| Irish Albums Chart | 13 |
| UK Albums Chart | 4 |
| US Folk Albums | 7 |
| US Top Heatseekers | 17 |

=== Year-end charts ===
| Chart (2010) | Position |
|---|---|
| UK Albums Chart | 114 |

=== Certifications ===
| Region | Certification | Certified units/sales |
|---|---|---|
| United Kingdom (BPI) | Gold | 250,315 |
