= Alas, I Cannot Swim =

Alas I Cannot Swim

Studio album by Laura Marling
- Released: 4 February 2008
- Recorded: 2007
- Genre: Folk-pop
- Length: 38:22
- Label: Virgin
- Producer: Charlie Fink

Laura Marling chronology
Alas I Cannot Swim (2008)	I Speak Because I Can (2010)

Alas, I Cannot Swim is the debut studio album by British singer-songwriter Laura Marling. The album was nominated for the 2008 Mercury Music Prize.

== Background ==
The album was produced by the lead vocalist of her previous band, Noah and the Whale, Charlie Fink, and was initially released on 4 February 2008, three days after her 18th birthday, then conventionally released a week later.

Marling had released several smaller singles and EPs before releasing her debut album. She told Neil McCormick of The Daily Telegraph: "I did my first EP just to get rid of songs I didn't like. They were just so awful. I don't think I really found out what I was doing until about six months after I signed a deal."

== Recording ==
"Ghosts"
The use of understated percussion is evident on "Ghosts", as well as introducing string arrangements that Marling "had absolutely nothing to do with".

The album was recorded in Eastcote Studios, a small independent studio in the west of London regarded as "honest and organic" by Marling.

== Promotion and release ==
The album was first released on 4 February 2008 in a "songbox" format, which comprised the CD album, a redeemable code for free concert tickets, and a "memento" for every song on the album.

== Reception ==
=== Critical ===
Professional ratings
Review scores
Source	Rating
AllMusic	3.5/5 stars
Drowned in Sound	7/10 stars
The Guardian	4/5 stars
The Independent	5/5 stars
NME	7/10 stars
Pitchfork Media	(6.8/10)
Q	(2008)
The Times	4/5 stars
Uncut	3/5 stars

Media response to Alas, I Cannot Swim was favourable; aggregating website Metacritic reports a normalised rating of 73% based on 7 critical reviews. The Guardian's Caroline Sullivan called the album "unnervingly grown-up" and wrote: "Simplicity is the key: playing acoustic guitar and singing in a gentle verge-of-womanhood voice, she keeps things homespun and rootsy." Kev Kharas of Drowned in Sound noted "Marling's skill at making one word bleed with more meaning than half a dozen or so vainglorious chorus lines", while Allmusic's Stewart Mason commented on the "old-school '70s singer/songwriter vibe" of the album, focusing in particular on her "alluringly husky voice and graceful acoustic guitar".

Due to the timing of the album coinciding with Feist's commercially successful third studio album The Reminder, Mason said that "there's every chance that [she] will get lost in the shuffle as the unexpected commercial success [...] leads major labels to unleash hordes of similarly talented female singer/songwriters". Comparisons between Marling and Canadian songwriter Joni Mitchell were cited by many, including Andrew Murfett of The Age, Matt Connors of The Courier-Mail and Cameron Adams of The Herald Sun.

In addition, "Ghosts" appeared in Australian radio station Triple J's Hottest 100 of 2008 at #43, and "Crawled Out of the Sea" was used in the final episode of the third series of Skins. In October 2011, NME placed "My Manic and I" at number 146 on its list "150 Best Tracks of the Past 15 Years".

=== Commercial ===
Alas, I Cannot Swim entered the UK Albums Chart at number 45. It was certified gold in the United Kingdom, selling over 100,000 copies.

== Track listing ==
All songs written and composed by Laura Marling.

No.	Title	Length
1.	"Ghosts"	3:01
2.	"Old Stone"	2:59
3.	"Tap at My Window"	2:48
4.	"Failure"	3:21
5.	"You're No God"	2:28
6.	"Cross Your Fingers"	2:24
7.	"(Interlude) Crawled Out of the Sea"	1:16
8.	"My Manic and I"	3:56
9.	"Night Terror"	3:09
10.	"The Captain and the Hourglass"	3:10
11.	"Shine"	2:39
12.	"Your Only Doll (Dora)"	7:19

- "Alas I Cannot Swim" is included at the end of "Your Only Doll (Dora)" as a hidden track

== Personnel ==
- Laura Marling – voice, guitar
- Marcus Mumford – drums, percussion, accordion
- Tom "Fiddle" Hobden – string arrangement
- Pete Roe – banjo, keyboards
- Ted Dwane – double bass
- Joe Ichinose – fiddle
- Guy Davie – mastering
- Guy Katsav – recording, mixing
- Charlie Fink – production

== Charts ==
Chart performance for Alas, I Cannot Swim
Chart (2008)	Peak position
Australian Albums (ARIA)	98
UK Albums (OCC)	45
