= Laura Marling =

British folk singer-songwriter (born 1990)

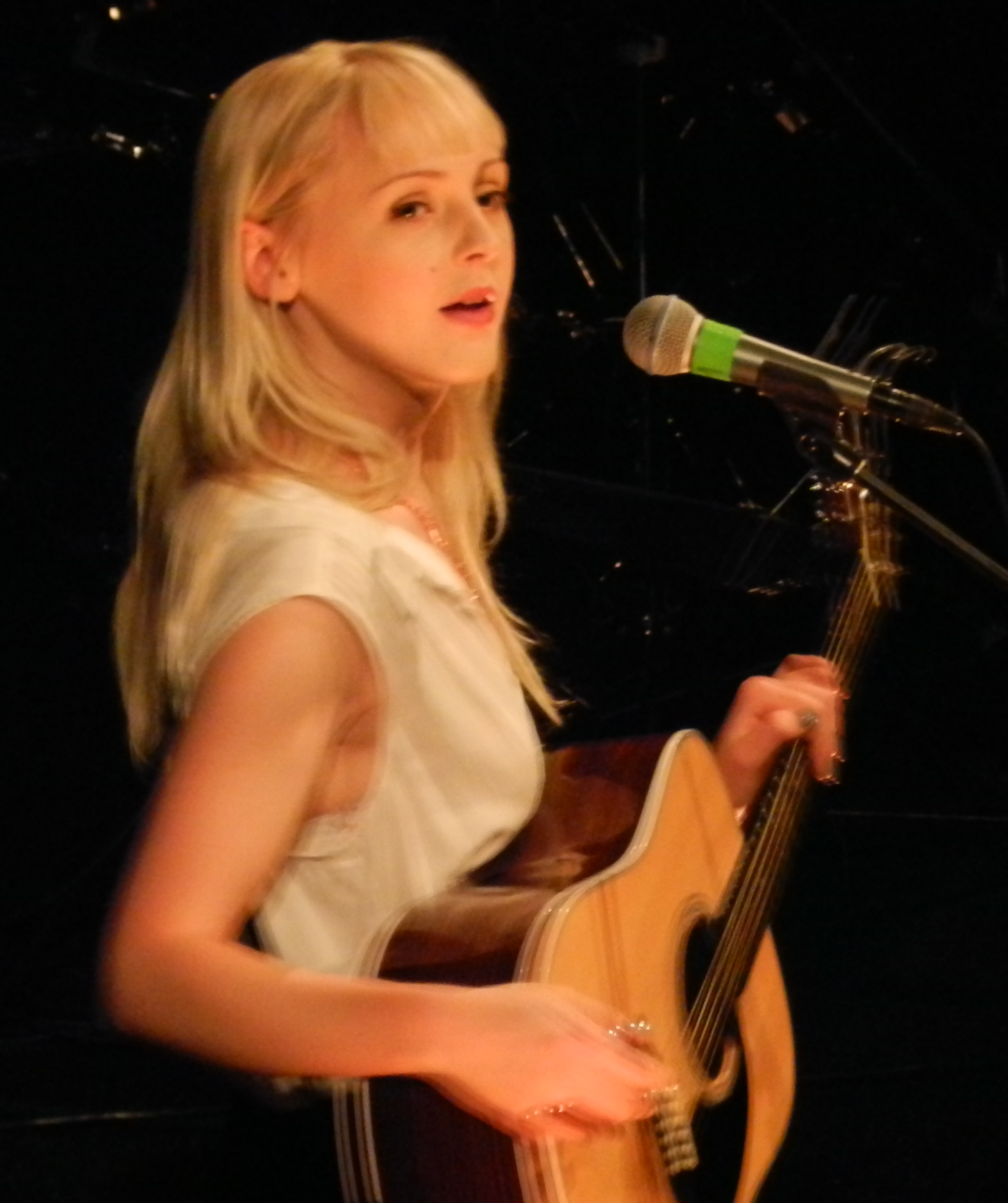
- Marling performing at the Sydney Opera House in February 2012

Background information
- Born: Laura Beatrice Marling; 1 February 1990 (age 36)
- Genres: Folk; folk rock; indie folk
- Occupations: Singer-songwriter; musician
- Instruments: Vocals; guitar; bass; piano; ukulele
- Years active: 2006–present
- Labels: WayOutWest; Virgin; Ribbon; Chrysalis; Partisan
- Website: lauramarling.com

Laura Beatrice Marling (born 1 February 1990) is an English folk singer-songwriter. She won the Brit Award for Best British Female Solo Artist at the 2011 Brit Awards and was nominated for the same award at the 2012, 2014, 2016, and 2018 Brit Awards.

Marling joined her elder sisters in London at age 16 to pursue a career in music. She played with a number of groups and released her debut album, Alas, I Cannot Swim, in 2008. Her first album, her second album I Speak Because I Can, her fourth album Once I Was an Eagle, and her seventh album Song for Our Daughter were nominated for the Mercury Music Prize in 2008, 2010, 2013, and 2020, respectively. Her sixth record, Semper Femina, was also nominated for a Grammy Award in the Best Folk Album category, as was Song for Our Daughter. In 2024, Marling released her eighth solo record, Patterns in Repeat.

Her songwriting is associated with sex and relationships, psychoanalysis, loss, the modern concept of womanhood, and trauma. Marling's eight studio solo albums have all been met with critical acclaim and she is widely considered to be one of the most accomplished songwriters of the nu folk music scene in Britain.

== Early life ==
Marling is the youngest of three daughters. Her mother is a music teacher. Marling's father, Sir Charles William Somerset Marling, 5th baronet ran a recording studio, introduced her to folk music, and shaped her musical taste, an experience that Marling later described as, "a bit of a blessing and a bit of a curse. ... [because] I couldn't slot myself into the age-appropriate genre". When she was five years old, her father taught her to play the guitar.

Her mother was abandoned after World War II, put into foster care, and later adopted. Marling later reflected on her matriarchal bloodline through songs written for her eighth studio album, Patterns in Repeat, which was released in October 2024. Marling was born when her mother was 44 years old.

She grew up on a farm in Eversley, a small village in Hampshire. Black Sabbath recorded at her father's studio when she was six months old.

Marling was privately educated at Waverly Primary School in Finchampstead, Berkshire and Leighton Park School, a Quaker school in Reading, Berkshire, where she had won a scholarship to attend. She later described her teenage years as "solitary" but did not find it difficult to make friends. During her secondary school years, she felt uneasy around other people and was afraid of death.

She wrote her first song, "Failure" at age 14 and the song later appeared on her debut album, Alas, I Cannot Swim, released in 2008.

== Music career ==
After completing her GCSEs at age 16, Marling joined her older sisters and settled in the outskirts of London. She soon joined a cluster of intertwined bands that were drawn to acoustic instruments and tradition-tinged melodies—the group formed a musical movement that was labelled "nu-folk" by the British press. Marling joined the original line-up of indie folk band Noah and the Whale and appears as a background vocalist on their debut album, Peaceful, the World Lays Me Down; however, she left the group before the album's 2008 release due to a dissolved relationship with the band's lead singer, Charlie Fink. Marling appeared on The Rakes track "Suspicious Eyes" from the band's 2007 album, Ten New Messages, credited as 'Laura Marlin'. Marling later collaborated with Mystery Jets and contributed guest vocals to their 2008 single "Young Love". Early in her career, Marling performed with members of the band Mumford & Sons: Ted Dwane, Marcus Mumford, and Winston Marshall.

=== 2008–2011: First three albums ===
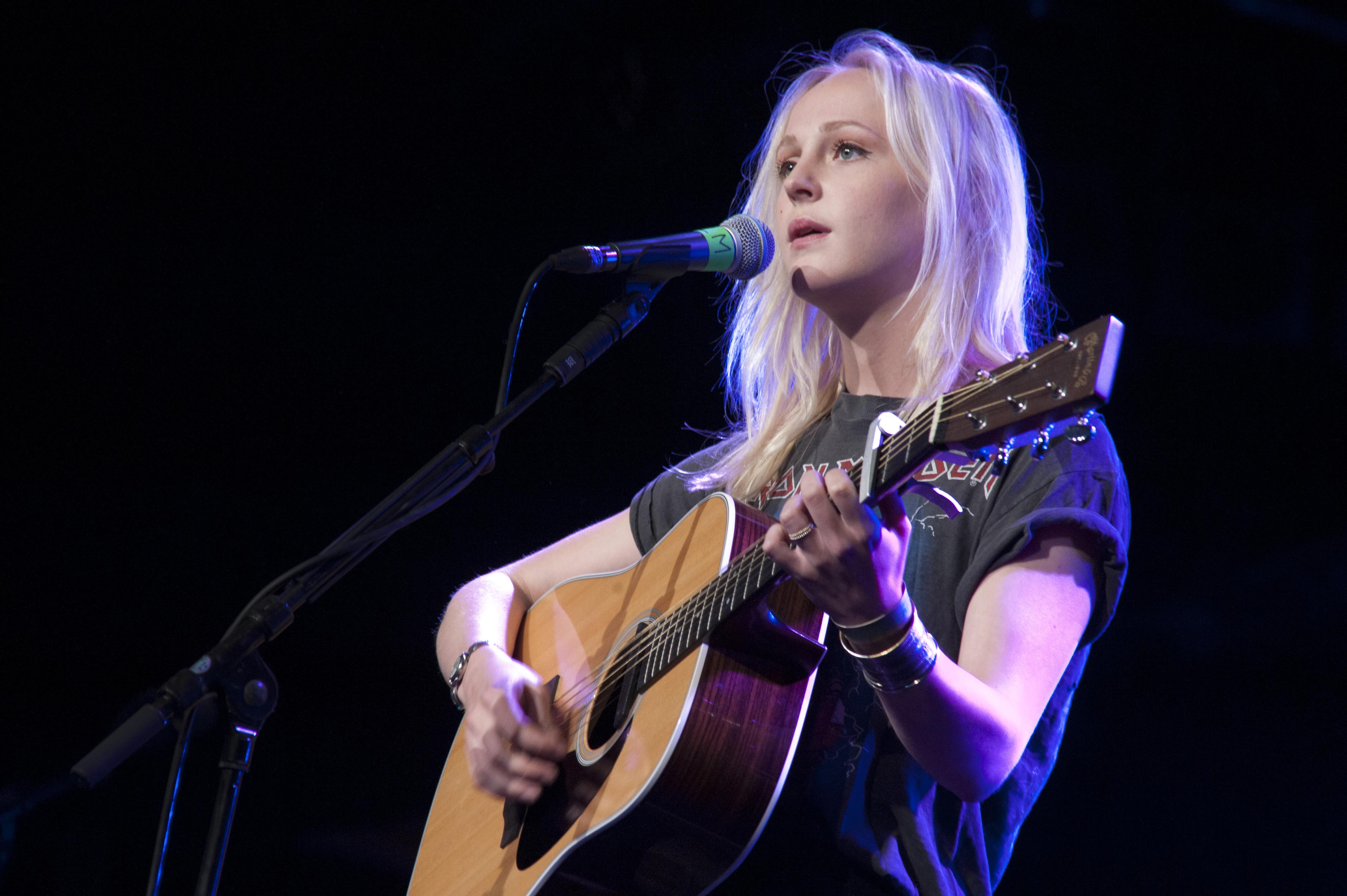
Marling in 2011

Marling was invited to tour with Jamie T after he attended her second solo gig. She has toured with a number of other musicians including Adam Green from the anti-folk band The Moldy Peaches. She performed at the 2007 O_{2} Wireless Festival and at the first Underage Festival in August 2007 at Victoria Park, East London, before releasing her debut EP London Town on WayOutWest Records.

Her debut album Alas, I Cannot Swim was released on 4 February 2008, and was nominated for the 2008 Mercury Prize. The album, as well as subsequent singles, were released on Virgin Records. The third and final single from that album, "Night Terror" was released on 27 October 2008, coinciding with a six-date Night Terror Tour.

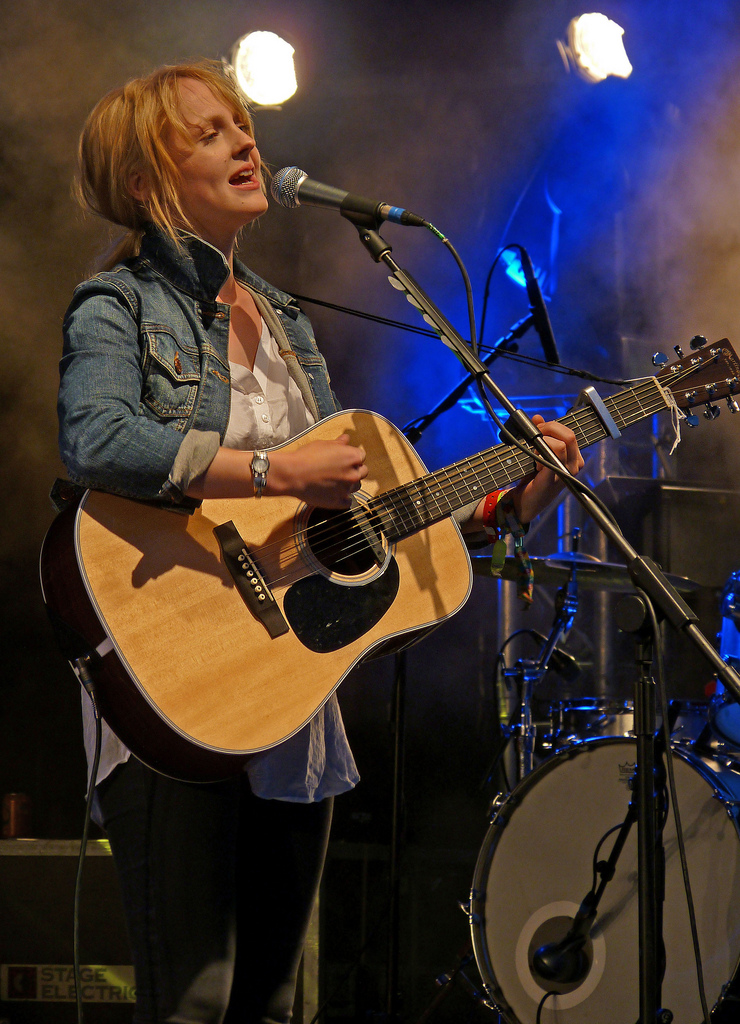
Laura Marling performing at Glastonbury in 2010.

Marling's television appearances include The Late Late Show with Craig Ferguson and Later With Jools Holland, performing "Ghosts" and "New Romantic", respectively. In 2008, she appeared on Russell Brand's Radio 2 show alongside her sister. She once chose to perform on the street after being denied entry to one of her own performances for being underage.

The follow-up to Alas, I Cannot Swim, titled I Speak Because I Can, was released on 22 March 2010. Produced by Ethan Johns, the album has a more mature sound and lyricism, dealing with "responsibility, particularly the responsibility of womanhood". The album is preceded by her singles "Goodbye England (Covered in Snow)", released on iTunes in December 2009, and "Devil's Spoke", released on 15 March 2010. On 28 March 2010, I Speak Because I Can entered the UK Albums Chart at Number 4. It was nominated for the 2010 Mercury Music Prize. In 2013, NME listed the album at 263 in their list of the 500 greatest albums of all time.

Marling's third album, A Creature I Don't Know, was released on 12 September 2011. The album received positive reviews and reached number four on the UK album charts.

=== 2012–2013: Once I Was an Eagle ===
During October 2012, Marling completed the Working Holiday Tour of the US as a solo performer. At the time, she announced that the fourth album, later named Once I Was an Eagle, was finished and was scheduled for a February 2013 release; this was later delayed until May 2013. On 8 March 2013, Marling confirmed that the album would be released on 27 May 2013 and would be released in the US one day later.

Marling's fourth album's first single, "Master Hunter", was released on 17 April 2013, while Once I Was an Eagle entered the UK charts at number 3.

Following the release of the album, Marling revealed that she only listened to "music made between 1969 and 1972" during the songwriting process for the album and described it as an era when "guitar was becoming a kind of masculine extension". Marling explained during the post-release promotional period that she sought a minimalist approach for the fourth album and, in contrast to the previous two albums, recorded all of the songs without a band.

Once I Was an Eagle is Marling's third album to be nominated for the Mercury Prize. The 2013 award was eventually won by James Blake.

Marling revealed in a September 2013 interview that she had enough songs for a fifth album at the time, and she will "maybe make this record and then have a big, long, hard think about what I've done". During a February 2014 performance for NPR's eTown series, Marling played one of the new songs, titled "Born to Love".

During a European tour for her fourth album, Marling expressed doubts about her long-term commitment to the music industry in an interview:

When I play, I am very much in the space where I was when I wrote the music. You could slay me quite easily, I'm at my most vulnerable. I am very private, in all aspects of my life, to everybody, so why is it that I get up on stage every night and open myself in front of strangers? I'm not sure if I've got the bottle for it, any more.

Marling added that she is sometimes surprised by her profession in relation to the music industry as a whole and often thinks, "oh, I exist in this industry" when listening to the radio, saying that she is unsure if she wants to remain in such a position.

=== 2014–2017: Short Movie and Semper Femina ===
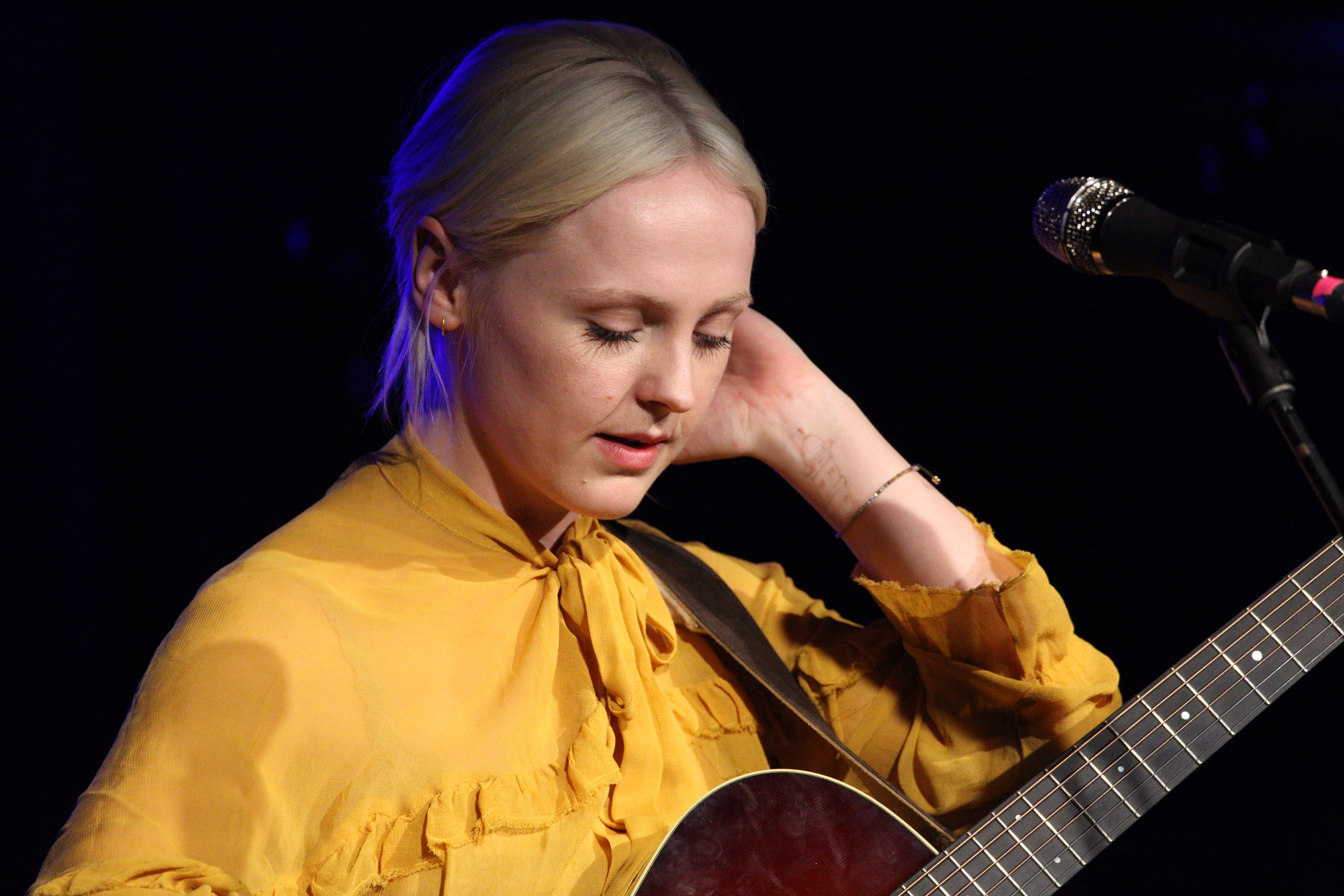
Marling in 2017

On 16 December 2014, Marling announced that her fifth studio album would be titled Short Movie. The album's title track, released on the same date, is the lead single and was made available for digital download. The album features 13 songs composed by Marling and was released in the UK on 23 March 2015 and one day later in the US.

Marling began recording songs for the album shortly after completing the solo tour for Once I Was an Eagle. The songs were written in the US, reflecting Marling's experience of living in Los Angeles. However, after recording a new album, she felt unsatisfied with the result, and made the decision to scrap most of the songs written in that period. During this time, she became involved in activities unrelated to music. When production later resumed, she completed the album with her band at Urchin Studios in London. Marling produced the album alongside Dan Cox and Matt Ingram.

The second single from the record, "False Hope", premiered on 20 January. The track was available for digital download the next day. Both "False Hope" and "Short Movie" were received with critical acclaim, many reviewers noting the larger sound and the confidence in Marling's vocals.

In October 2015, Marling announced a short Tour de Ville through the US, where she would be previewing material from her forthcoming sixth studio album.

In a tweet, Blake Mills confirmed that Marling's sixth studio album was completed. In November 2016, Marling announced the release of Semper Femina in March 2017, with "Soothing" being the first single from the record. The album was released to critical acclaim. Marling received her first Grammy nomination for Best Folk Album for Semper Femina, but did not win the award. Semper Femina was also nominated for IMPALA's European Album of the Year Award.

Marling covered "Red Right Hand" by Nick Cave and the Bad Seeds and "A Hard Rain's a-Gonna Fall" by Bob Dylan for the Season 4 finale of Peaky Blinders which aired on 20 December 2017.

=== 2018: Lump ===
In 2018, Marling announced that she would be recording an album with Mike Lindsay of the band Tunng, under the name Lump. Prior to releasing an album, the duo released two singles, "Curse of the Contemporary" and "Late to the Flight". On 1 June 2018, Lump released its self-titled debut album. Marling provided the vocals and lyrics, while Lindsay played most of the instruments on the album.

=== 2020–present: Song for Our Daughter, second Lump album and Patterns in Repeat ===
Marling duetted with the Radiohead guitarist Ed O'Brien on "Cloak of the Night" on his debut solo album, Earth, released in 2020. On 5 April, Marling announced her seventh solo album via an Instagram post, and released a song, "Held Down", at midnight. Song for Our Daughter was released on 10 April. The album, which had been set for release in August, was released early, in part due to the COVID-19 pandemic. The pandemic also caused Marling to cancel many 2020 tour dates.

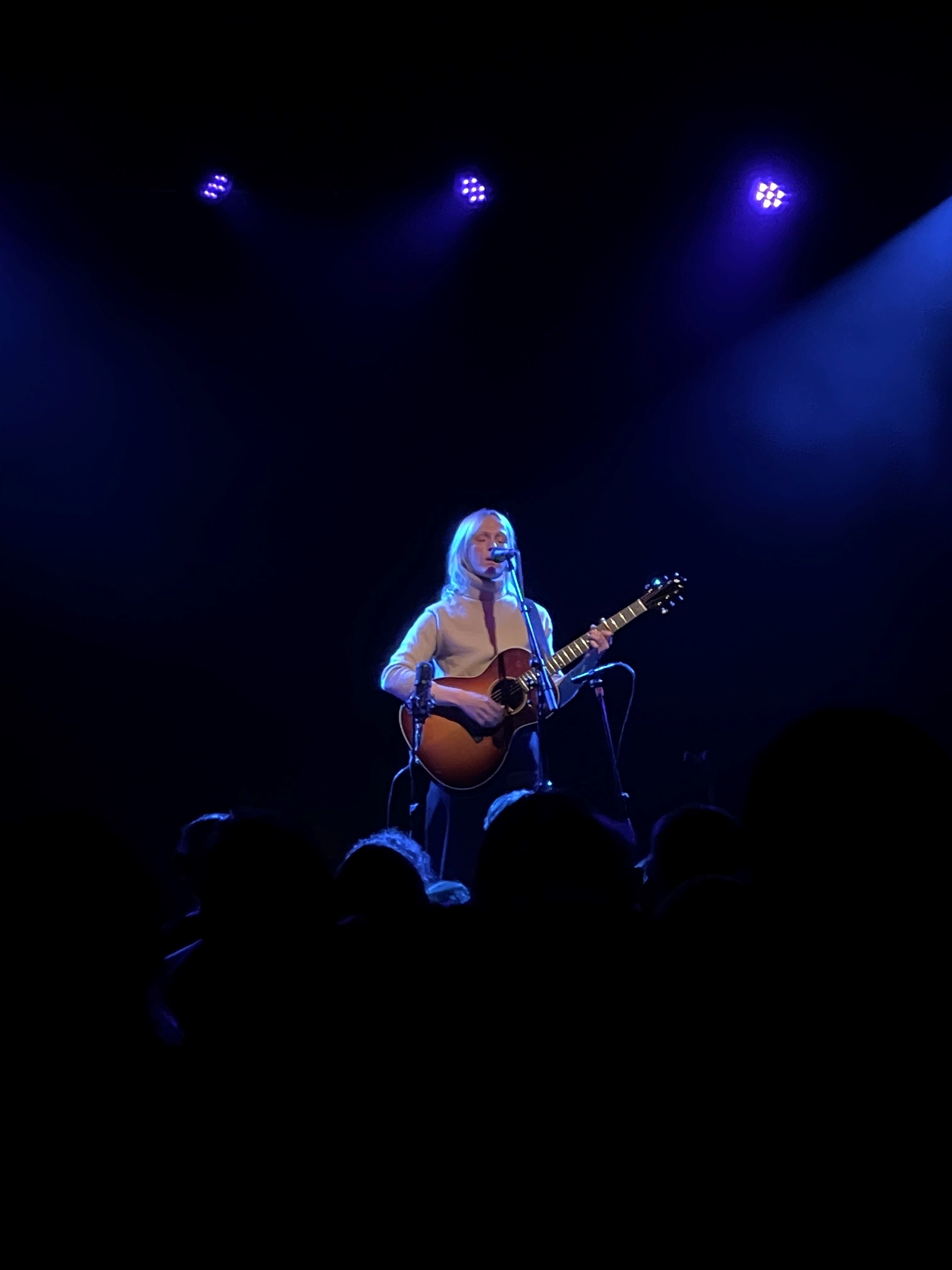
Laura Marling performing at The Independent in San Francisco in December 2021

The songs from the album featured predominately in several notable online performances including Live at the Union Chapel: live-streamed on 6 June 2020, with a selection of songs being pressed to limited edition vinyl. The performance was described by NME magazine as 'taking lockdown gigs to heavenly new heights'. The Lockdown Sessions was recorded at Marling's home in April 2020 and released as part of Rough Trade's albums of the year in December, and the BBC Radio 6 Music Festival: her 'headline' solo performance on 26 March 2021 that also included a performance of a new track, titled "The Shadows".

On 22 March 2021, Marling announced dates for a UK tour in October 2021 performing the songs from Song for Our Daughter live for an audience for the first time.

On 5 May 2021, Marling announced the follow-up album to her collaboration with Mike Lindsay as Lump, entitled Animal, along with the release of the lead single of the same name. The album was released on 30 July by Partisan and Chrysalis Records.

Following the birth of her daughter in 2023, Marling began writing and recording her eighth album, Patterns In Repeat, in London. With themes centred on motherhood, relationships, and parenting, the album was released on 25 October 2024.

On 5 June 2026, Marling released her album Laura Sings Raffi, a children's music album with all songs written by or associated with Canadian children's singer Raffi.

== Acting ==
Marling co-stars in the short film Woman Driver, which was filmed in Marfa, Texas, and directed by Chris Perkel. The movie was shot and edited in 72 hours. Marling later won "Best Actress" at the 72-Hour National Film Challenge. The film was shown at the London Short Film Festival on 14 January 2015 and premiered on Vimeo the following month. The film also featured new music from Marling.

== Personal life ==
Marling was in a relationship with Noah and the Whale singer/guitarist Charlie Fink until 2008. She also dated Marcus Mumford of Mumford & Sons until late 2010. She moved to Silver Lake in Los Angeles, California, in 2013, before relocating to London in December 2014, after purchasing her first home. In September 2013, Marling explained: "I am a solitary person but I love people, I'm not a misanthrope. I like the idea of speaking only when it's strictly necessary. The closest I ever feel to people is in shared experience. I'm still exploring that, I don't know where it's going to lead me."

As of 2020, she resides in Stoke Newington in London with her boyfriend, musician George Jephson, whom she met after returning to England after living in Los Angeles, and her older sister. In 2020, Marling was enrolled in a master's degree program in psychoanalysis. In February 2023, Marling announced, via Instagram, that she had given birth to a daughter. Her daughter, Maudie, was born at home "by accident" due to Marling's midwives stopping at her home for check-up. In November 2024, Marling announced, via her newsletter, that she was pregnant with her second child. In December 2025, Marling announced the birth of her son.

She completed her master's degree in psychoanalysis in 2024 and is a full-time stay-at-home mother, in addition to her career as a singer-songwriter. Her boyfriend owns a restaurant specialising in charcuterie in East London. Marling was previously a vegan but is a vegetarian as of 2024. In a 2024 interview with The Times, Marling described the initial five-album record deal she signed as a teenager as "dreadful"; neither she nor her daughter own the rights to her first five albums, which Marling further explained is "devastating".

== Discography ==
=== Solo ===
- Alas, I Cannot Swim (2008)
- I Speak Because I Can (2010)
- A Creature I Don't Know (2011)
- Once I Was an Eagle (2013)
- Short Movie (2015)
- Semper Femina (2017)
- Song for Our Daughter (2020)
- Patterns in Repeat (2024)
- Laura Sings Raffi (2026)

=== With Lump ===
- Lump (2018)
- Animal (2021)

== Awards and nominations ==
Year	Organisation	Nominated work	Award	Result
2008	Mercury Prize	Alas, I Cannot Swim	Mercury Prize	Nominated
2010	Mercury Prize	I Speak Because I Can	Mercury Prize	Nominated
2010	RTÉ Radio 1	I Speak Because I Can	Album of the Year	Nominated
2011	BBC Radio 2 Folk Awards	"Rambling Man"	Best Original Song	Nominated
2011	Brit Awards	Herself	British Female Solo Artist	Won
2011	NME Awards	Herself	Best Solo Artist	Won
2011	Q Awards	Herself	Best Female	Nominated
2012	Brit Awards	Herself	British Female Solo Artist	Nominated
2012	NME Awards	Herself	Best Solo Artist	Nominated
2013	Mercury Prize	Once I Was an Eagle	Mercury Prize	Nominated
2014	Brit Awards	Herself	British Female Solo Artist	Nominated
2016	Brit Awards	Herself	British Female Solo Artist	Nominated
2018	Grammy Awards	Semper Femina	Best Folk Album	Nominated
2018	IMPALA	Semper Femina	European Independent Album of the Year	Nominated
2018	Brit Awards	Herself	British Female Solo Artist	Nominated
2020	Mercury Prize	Song for Our Daughter	Mercury Prize	Nominated
2021	UK Americana Awards	Song for Our Daughter	Best-selling Americana Album of the Year	Won
2021	Grammy Awards	Song for Our Daughter	Best Folk Album	Nominated
2021	The Ivors	Song for Our Daughter	Best Album	Nominated
