= Bottled at Source – The Best of the Source Years =

Bottled at Source - The Best of the Source Years

Greatest hits album by Turin Brakes
- Released: 2009
- Recorded: 2000–2008
- Genre: Folk rock, indie rock
- Label: Source (UK); EMI / Astralwerks (US)
- Producer: Turin Brakes

Turin Brakes chronology
Dark on Fire (2008)	Bottled at Source - The Best of the Source Years (2009)	Outbursts (2010)

Bottled at Source is a compilation album by British band Turin Brakes, released in 2009.

== Track listing ==
=== Disc 1 ===
1. Pain Killer - from the album Ether Song
2. Underdog (Save Me) - from the album The Optimist LP
3. Emergency 72 - from the album The Optimist LP
4. Long Distance - from the album Ether Song
5. The Door - from the album The Optimist LP
6. 5 Mile (These Are the Days) - from the single 5 Mile (These Are the Days) and the album Ether Song
7. Feeling Oblivion - from the album The Optimist LP
8. Average Man - from the album Ether Song
9. Over and Over - from the album JackInABox
10. Mind Over Money [Extended Radio Edit] - from the single Mind Over Money
11. Fishing for a Dream - from the album JackInABox
12. Dark on Fire - from the album Dark on Fire
13. Red Moon - from the album JackInABox
14. Something in my Eye - from the album Dark on Fire
15. Stalker - from the album Dark on Fire
16. Last Chance - from the album Dark on Fire
17. Ether Song - from the album Ether Song

=== Bonus Disc ===
1. Underdog (Sally) [Demo]
2. Balham to Brooklyn [BBC Scotland Session] - from the single Underdog (Save Me)
3. Mind Over Money [Demo]
4. Everybody Knows [7" version] - from the single Emergency 72
5. Lost and Found [Home Recording] - from the single Long Distance
6. Where's My Army? [Home Recording] - from the single Pain Killer
7. So Long [L.A. Demo] - from the single Average Man
8. Moonlight Mile - from the album Late Night Tales
9. Atlas of the World - from the single Fishing for a Dream
10. Asleep with the Fireflies [Live at the Palladium] - from the album Live at the Palladium
11. Capsule - from the EP Something Out of Nothing
12. Love Is All You Deserve - From The Red Moon EP
13. The Seagull
14. Time Machine
15. Cumulous Clouds
16. Rise
17. Nessun Dorma [XFM Session, Sept 2007]
