= Surrounded by Time =

2021 studio album by Tom Jones

Studio album by Tom Jones
- Released: 23 April 2021
- Recorded: 2019 – March 2020
- Studios: Monnow Valley (Rockfield, Wales); Real World (Box, Wiltshire) (Note: Additional recording at Three Crows East in Wiltshire and Bert Jansch Studio in Frome.)
- Genres: Art rock; experimental rock; electronica; folk rock; soul
- Length: 61:43
- Labels: EMI; S-Curve
- Producer: Ethan Johns

Tom Jones chronology
The Complete Decca Studio Album Collection (2020)	Surrounded by Time (2021)

Singles from Surrounded by Time
- 1. "Talking Reality Television Blues" Released: 15 January 2021; 2. "No Hole in My Head" Released: 27 January 2021; 3. "One More Cup of Coffee" Released: 18 March 2021; 4. "Pop Star" Released: 9 April 2021

Singles from Surrounded by Time (The Hourglass Edition)
- 1. "Not Dark Yet" Released: 19 October 2021

Surrounded by Time is the 41st studio album by Welsh singer Tom Jones, released on 23 April 2021 through EMI Records internationally and S-Curve Records in the United States. It is Jones' fourth covers album to be produced by Ethan Johns, whom he has worked with since 2009. It was supported by the singles "Talking Reality Television Blues", "No Hole in My Head", "One More Cup of Coffee", and "Pop Star". The album received positive reviews from critics, with much praise being directed towards Jones' vocals at 80 years of age as well as the selection of songs for the album. It debuted at number one in the United Kingdom, making Jones the oldest male to earn a number-one UK album, and charted within the top 25 in five other countries.

== Background ==
Tom Jones began working with record producer Ethan Johns, who had worked with acts such as Kings of Leon, Joe Cocker, and Crowded House, in 2009. Johns had told Island Records that he wanted to work with Jones the most, and the label eventually brought the two together. Their first album together, Praise & Blame (2010), consisted of cover versions of gospel songs to the tune of American roots music. They recorded a follow-up album of more gospel covers, Spirit in the Room, which was released in 2012. In the same year, Jones joined The Voice UK as one of the show's first four vocal coaches. Jones and Johns later recorded their third album together, Long Lost Suitcase, and released it in 2015.

While on his tour supporting Long Lost Suitcase, Jones' wife Linda Rose Woodward was diagnosed with cancer, causing Jones to cancel his tour dates for the foreseeable future. Woodward eventually died from the cancer in April 2016. Afterward, Jones followed Woodward's advice and sold their Los Angeles mansion, subsequently moving to a flat in London. Prior to her death, Woodward encouraged Jones to continue recording and performing music after she died. Jones recalled in a 2021 interview with HMV that he was originally unable to perform following her death, saying that "I didn’t know if I could sing. When you get too emotional, your voice doesn't work ... It knocked me completely off balance".

== Recording ==
After Jones had recovered from his wife's death, he resumed touring and continued for a few years. He gathered his son, Mark Woodward, along with Johns and a group of session musicians to begin recording a new album in 2019. They recorded the album into 2020 with Jones finishing the last of the album's vocals immediately prior to the beginning of a lockdown caused by the increased severity of the COVID-19 pandemic in the United Kingdom. The album was primarily recorded at Monnow Valley Studio in Rockfield, Monmouthshire, marking the first time that Jones had recorded music in his home country of Wales, and Real World Studios in Box, Wiltshire. Additional recording took place at Johns' Three Crows East studio in Wiltshire and the Bert Jansch Studio in Frome. The Bert Jansch Studio was also where the album was mixed. The recording sessions saw changes in the way some songs were originally planned to turn out; "I'm Growing Old" eventually turned out to be only Jones accompanied by a piano player and "Ol' Mother Earth" was done in a spoken word manner as opposed to being sung. Similar to most of Jones' past songs, "This Is the Sea" was completed in one take.

== Promotion and release ==
The announcement of Surrounded by Time came on 15 January 2021, with its release date and track listing being revealed. On the same day, Jones' cover version of "Talking Reality Television Blues", originally written by Todd Snider, was released as the album's lead single, with a music video for the song being released in conjunction. The album's second single, "No Hole in My Head", originally written by Malvina Reynolds, was released roughly two weeks later on 27 January alongside a music video. He performed the song live on The Graham Norton Show two days later and was briefly interviewed by Norton after the performance. The third single from the album, "One More Cup of Coffee", originally written by Bob Dylan, was released on 18 March. The fourth and final pre-release single released from the album, "Pop Star", originally written by Cat Stevens, was released on 9 April alongside a music video.

Surrounded by Time was released through EMI Records internationally and S-Curve Records in the United States. Its release on digital music platforms and physical releases through EMI came on 23 April 2021. Physically, the album was sold as a CD, 12-inch black vinyl, and cassette. Each physical version of the album was allowed to be bundled with a T-shirt displaying the album's cover art through Jones' official website. For the Japanese CD release, Jones' 1965 recording of "It's Not Unusual" was included as a bonus track. A non-import version of the CD release for United States markets was released on 7 May through S-Curve. A repackaged expanded edition of Surrounded by Time, named The Hourglass Edition, was announced on 19 October 2021. The re-release includes an additional disc comprising a cover version of Bob Dylan's "Not Dark Yet", a new composition titled "One Hell of a Life", four live performances of Surrounded by Time tracks at Shepherd's Bush Empire, and an interview with Jones and Peter Paphides. The cover of "Not Dark Yet" was released as a single on the day of the announcement. The Hourglass Edition was released on 3 December 2021 through EMI. Alongside a digital release, it received a standard double-CD release as well a deluxe box set release, designed as a 7-inch gatefold package that includes a booklet and additional art cards.

On 3 September 2022, Jones performed "I Won't Crumble With You If You Fall" on The Voice UK. Within 24 hours, the song had peaked on the UK iTunes chart at number 1.

== Reception ==
=== Critical ===
Professional ratings
Aggregate scores
Source	Rating
AnyDecentMusic?	7.5/10
Metacritic	83/100
Review scores
Source	Rating
AllMusic	4/5 stars
Clash	8/10
The Daily Telegraph	5/5 stars
DIY	4/5 stars
The Guardian	3/5 stars
The Independent	4/5 stars
Mojo	4/5 stars
musicOMH	4.5/5 stars
The Times	4/5 stars
Uncut	8/10

Surrounded by Time received positive reviews from critics. At Metacritic, which assigns a normalised rating out of 100 to reviews from mainstream publications, the album received a weighted average score of 83, based on 9 reviews, indicating "universal acclaim". Critics mainly praised Jones' vocal ability at a late point in his career as well as the songs selected to be covered for the album.

The Daily Telegraph's Neil McCormick awarded the album five out of five stars, lauding Jones' vocal ability at 80 years of age. He also applauded the selection of songs for the album, calling the performance of "I'm Growing Old" in particular "a powerful statement in this age-defying business. Jones turns it into an act of gentle if sorrowful surrender." Writing for musicOMH, Ben Hogwood praised Jones' vocals, saying that he is "expressing more emotion than he probably has at any point in his career", as well as Ethan Johns' production and the instrumental performances by the session musicians. He also considered the album to be more than a standard covers album, stating "it is more a series of songs that Jones and his cohorts have taken into the repair shop, stripped down to the bare bones, and rebuilt in the shape of their new front man."

Lisa Wright of DIY also considered it to go beyond a typical covers album, writing that "ostensibly a covers collection ... it instead comes across as something of a send off – a release that embraces the gravitas and legacy of Tom’s life and attempts to tie up the loose ends." Clash praised Jones for pushing boundaries on the album, calling Surrounded by Time a "12 strong song cycle that finds Tom Jones doing exactly as he pleases. It’s an extraordinary balancing act, another vital page in this remarkable ongoing chapter." Writing for AllMusic, Thom Jurek called the album "magnificent" and said that it is "redolent with wisdom and a raging lust for life that is free of camp. It offers abundant proof that despite the passing of years, Jones has lost none his power or swagger." The Independent's Helen Brown thoroughly enjoyed the album, calling Jones "an ongoing triumph of hope and experience."

The Guardian's Alexis Petridis wrote a less favourable review of the album, but still enjoyed parts of it; he praised certain cover versions while stating "the other experiments are a mixed bag." He additionally praised Jones' desire to freely record whatever he pleases despite being primarily known for "belting out 'It's Not Unusual' at Hampton Court Palace and the Rhyl Events Arena".

=== Commercial ===
In the United Kingdom, Surrounded by Time debuted at number one on the albums chart; it was considered to be on track for a number-one debut during the midweek chart update. In its first week, it sold 14,936 copies, with 13,243 of those being physical sales. This marked Jones' fourth number-one UK album in his career, his first since Reload in 1999. This feat also made Jones, at 80 years and 10 months, both the oldest male to earn a number-one UK album and the oldest artist ever to earn a number-one UK album with an album of newly recorded material, overtaking Bob Dylan, who topped the chart at 79 years old in June 2020 with Rough and Rowdy Ways. Additionally, Surrounded by Time was the best-selling album of the week in terms of both physical and download sales. The album remained in the top-5 after its second week of release, falling to No. 5.

== Track listing ==
Surrounded by Time track listing
No.	Title	Writer(s)	Length
1.	"I Won't Crumble with You If You Fall"	Bernice Johnson Reagon	3:16
2.	"The Windmills of Your Mind"	Alan Bergman, Marilyn Bergman, Michel Legrand	4:43
3.	"Pop Star"	Cat Stevens	4:00
4.	"No Hole in My Head"	Malvina Reynolds	4:08
5.	"Talking Reality Television Blues"	Todd Snider	6:29
6.	"I Won't Lie"	Paul Butler, Michael Kiwanuka	4:28
7.	"This Is the Sea"	Mike Scott	7:11
8.	"One More Cup of Coffee"	Bob Dylan	3:45
9.	"Samson and Delilah"	Traditional (arranged by Ethan Johns, Tom Jones, Mark Woodward)	5:06
10.	"Ol' Mother Earth"	Tony Joe White	5:16
11.	"I'm Growing Old"	Bobby Cole	4:14
12.	"Lazarus Man"	Terry Callier	9:07
Total length:			61:43

Japanese edition bonus track
No.	Title	Writer(s)	Length
13.	"It's Not Unusual"	Gordon Mills, Les Reed	2:03
Total length:			63:46

The Hourglass Edition bonus disc
No.	Title	Writer(s)	Length
1.	"Not Dark Yet"	Dylan	3:53
2.	"One Hell of a Life"	Katell Keineg	5:22
3.	"I Won't Crumble with You If You Fall" (Live from Shepherd's Bush Empire)	Reagon	4:56
4.	"Samson and Delilah" (Live from Shepherd's Bush Empire)	Traditional (arr. Johns, Jones, Woodward)	5:43
5.	"Ol' Mother Earth" (Live from Shepherd's Bush Empire)	White	4:57
6.	"This Is the Sea" (Live from Shepherd's Bush Empire)	Scott	6:18
7.	"In Conversation with Pete Paphides"	N/A	16:55
Total length:			109:47

== Personnel ==
Personnel adapted from album liner notes and Tidal credits.

Session musicians

- Neil Cowley – piano (tracks 2, 3, 9, 10, 11), Moog synthesiser (tracks 1, 2, 6), organ (tracks 4, 7, 8), Fender Rhodes (track 12)
- Ethan Johns – Moog synthesiser (tracks 1, 4, 5, 7, 9, 10, 12), acoustic guitar (tracks 3, 7, 8), drum machine (tracks 3, 9, 12), electric guitar (tracks 4, 5, 12), percussion (tracks 2, 9, 10), sound effects (tracks 2, 8, 12), ARP Strings (tracks 2, 7), Continuum Fingerboard (tracks 9, 10), Mellotron (tracks 2, 3), Moog sequence/bass (tracks 2, 3), sitar (tracks 3, 4), bass guitar (track 9), Chamberlin (track 3), dulcimer (track 9), electric piano (track 6), hi-hat and ride cymbal (track 3), organ (track 2), synth strings (track 6), tabla (track 4), tambourine (track 4)
- Tom Jones – vocals (all tracks)
- Nick Pini – bass guitar (tracks 2–4, 10, 12), upright bass (tracks 7–9), bowed bass (tracks 1, 5)
- Dan See – drums (tracks 4, 7–9, 12, percussion (tracks 2, 3), bass drum (track 5), mallets (track 1)
- Jeremy Stacey – drums (tracks 5, 10)
- Mark Woodward – guiro (track 12)

Technical personnel

- Matt Cotton – mastering engineer
- Ethan Johns – producer, engineer (tracks 4, 5), loops (track 11)
- Callum Marinho – mixer, recording engineer
- Dom Monks – engineer, loops (track 11)
- Mark Woodward – executive producer

Other personnel

- Alex Cowper – design, illustration
- Oriol Massaguer – cover art

== Charts ==
Chart performance for Surrounded by Time
Chart (2021)	Peak position
Austrian Albums (Ö3 Austria)	13
Belgian Albums (Ultratop Flanders)	14
Belgian Albums (Ultratop Wallonia)	191
Czech Albums (ČNS IFPI)	54
Dutch Albums (Album Top 100)	17
German Albums (Offizielle Top 100)	24
Irish Albums (IRMA)	62
Scottish Albums (Official Charts)	1
Swiss Albums (Schweizer Hitparade)	14
UK Albums (Official Charts)	1
US Top Album Sales (Billboard)	68

== Release history ==
Release	Region	Date	Format	Label	Catalogue no.
Surrounded by Time	Various	23 April 2021	CD	EMI	EMICD 2021
Surrounded by Time	Various	23 April 2021	12-inch vinyl	EMI	EMIV 2021
Surrounded by Time	Various	23 April 2021	Cassette	EMI	EMIMC 2021
Surrounded by Time	Various	23 April 2021	Download; streaming	EMI	20UMGIM88837
Surrounded by Time	Japan	23 April 2021	CD	EMI	UICY-15987
Surrounded by Time	United States	23 April 2021	Download; streaming	S-Curve	4050538674811
Surrounded by Time	United States	7 May 2021	CD	S-Curve	4050538681352
Surrounded by Time (The Hourglass Edition)	Various	3 December 2021	CD	EMI	EMICDY 2021
Surrounded by Time (The Hourglass Edition)	Various	3 December 2021	CD box set	EMI	EMICDX 2021
Surrounded by Time (The Hourglass Edition)	Various	3 December 2021	Download; streaming	EMI	21UMGIM66100

== Notes and references ==
Notes
