= Outburst =

Outburst may refer to:

- Outburst (comics), a fictional superhero
- Outburst (game), a word game
- Outburst (mining), the sudden and violent ejection of coal, gas and rock from a coal face and surrounding strata in an underground coal mine
- Outbursts (album), an album by Turin Brakes
- Outburst, a sudden release of emotion, commonly a tantrum

== See also ==
- Bursting Out
