= That Was Then (disambiguation) =

That Was Then is an American television drama series.

That Was Then may also refer to:

- That Was Then (EP), a 2021 EP by Trevor Daniel
- "That Was Then" (Jesse McCartney song), from the 2004 album Beautiful Soul
- "That Was Then" (Orchestral Manoeuvres in the Dark song), from the 1996 album Universal
- "That Was Then" (Dawson's Creek), a 2003 television episode

== See also ==
- That Was Then This Is Now (disambiguation)
