= Dark on Fire =

Studio album by Turin Brakes
- Released: 17 September 2007
- Recorded: 2007
- Genre: Folk rock
- Label: Source (UK); EMI / Astralwerks (US)
- Producer: Ethan Johns

Turin Brakes chronology
Turin Brakes: Live Session (2006)	Dark on Fire (2007)	Bottled at Source – The Best of the Source Years (2009)

Professional ratings
Review scores
Source	Rating
AllMusic	4/5 stars
The Guardian	4/5 stars
NME	2/5 stars
The Sunday Times	4/5 stars
Pitchfork	5.5/10

Dark on Fire is the fourth studio album by the British rock band Turin Brakes. The band spent 2006 writing and recording demo songs. These songs were tested live on a UK tour in November 2006. After this, Olly Knights and Gale Paridjanian teamed up with their live band and producer Ethan Johns to put the album together. The album was recorded in two different studios in London in early 2007. The band took a break from recording sessions late January because Gale's wife was expecting a baby, but in March 2007 the band finished the recording sessions.

The album was released on 17 September 2007 and entered the UK chart at #36. Special edition copies come with the 5-track bonus EP "Something Out Of Nothing."

The album was released to mostly generally favourable reviews although some reviewers found the new highly produced full-band sound to be disappointing. Others hailed the album as a return to the quality of 2001's The Optimist LP. Though the album sounds more glossy than previous efforts, it is in fact a mostly live recorded effort. This is significantly different from the previous albums. The band credit Ethan Johns with the idea for this approach. Playing the songs live to an audience helped shaping the songs as well.

== Track listing ==
All tracks are written by Turin Brakes.

No.	Title	Length
1.	"Last Chance"	4:39
2.	"Ghost"	3:28
3.	"Something in My Eye"	4:33
4.	"Stalker"	3:49
5.	"Other Side"	5:06
6.	"Dark on Fire"	4:46
7.	"Real Life"	2:55
8.	"For the Fire"	4:14
9.	"Timewaster"	2:57
10.	"Bye Pod"	4:58
11.	"Here Comes the Moon"	3:00
12.	"New Star"	4:19

Bonus EP
No.	Title	Length
1.	"Loopa"
2.	"Invisible Boy"
3.	"Brave New World"
4.	"Capsule"
5.	"Eveready"

== Singles ==
- "Stalker" (10 September 2007) – digital download and music video only
- "Something in My Eye" (13 January 2008) – digital download and music video only

== Personnel ==
- Rob Allum – drums, background vocals
- Phil Marten – keys
- Rachel Bolt – viola
- Hamish Brown – photography
- Alex Cowper – design
- Paul Wesley Griggs – photography
- Ethan Johns – drums, producer, engineer, string arrangements, mixing
- Paul Kegg – cello
- Olly Knights – guitar, vocals, string arrangements, photography
- Peter Lale – viola
- Perry Mason – violin
- Eddie Myer – bass, photography
- Gale Paridjanian – guitar, ukulele, background vocals, Mellotron, string arrangements, photography
- Fergus Peterkin – assistant engineer
- Anthony Pleeth – cello
- Turin Brakes – performer
- Tim Young – mastering
- Warren Zielinski – violin

== Charts ==
Chart performance for Dark on Fire
Chart (2007)	Peak position
UK Albums (OCC)	36
