= Spirit in the Room =

Studio album by Tom Jones
- Released: 21 May 2012
- Genres: Blues; Americana
- Length: 37:27
- Label: Island
- Producer: Ethan Johns

Tom Jones chronology
Praise & Blame (2010)	Spirit in the Room (2012)	Long Lost Suitcase (2015)

Professional ratings
Aggregate scores
Source	Rating
Metacritic	72/100
Review scores
Source	Rating
Allmusic	3.5/5 stars
The Independent	4/5 stars
BBC Music	Favourable
Pop Matters	8/10
MusicOMH	3.5/5 stars
NME	7/10

Spirit in the Room is the 39th studio album by Welsh musician Tom Jones, released 21 May 2012 and produced by Ethan Johns. The album is composed entirely of covers.

Among the songs covered on the album are Tom Waits’ "Bad as Me", Odetta’s "Hit or Miss", Vera Hall Ward’s "Travelling Shoes", Richard & Linda Thompson's "Dimming of the Day", and "Charlie Darwin" by The Low Anthem. The album also includes songs by Paul Simon, Leonard Cohen, and Paul McCartney among others.

== Track listing ==
No.	Title	Writer(s)	Length
1.	"Tower of Song"	Leonard Cohen	3:56
2.	"(I Want to) Come Home"	Paul McCartney	3:16
3.	"Hit or Miss"	Odetta Gordon	3:41
4.	"Love & Blessings"	Paul Simon	4:23
5.	"Soul of a Man"	Blind Willie Johnson	3:49
6.	"Bad as Me"	Kathleen Brennan, Tom Waits	3:33
7.	"Dimming of the Day"	Richard Thompson	3:01
8.	"Traveling Shoes"	Ethan Johns, Tom Jones	2:38
9.	"All Blues Hail Mary"	Joe Henry	4:25
10.	"Charlie Darwin"	The Low Anthem	4:45
Total length:			37:27

Deluxe edition bonus tracks
No.	Title	Writer(s)	Length
11.	"Just Dropped In"	Mickey Newbury	4:36
12.	"Lone Pilgrim"	B.F. White, Adger M. Pace	3:04
13.	"When the Deal Goes Down"	Bob Dylan	5:27
14.	"Hit or Miss" (radio version - bonus track)	Odetta Gordon	3:20
Total length:			53:54

== Personnel ==
- Tom Jones – vocals
- Ethan Johns – bass, e-bow, electric slide guitar, 12-string guitar, acoustic guitar, electric guitar, mixing, percussion, slide guitar, toy drums
- Richard Causon – piano, organ, harmonium
- Stella Mozgawa – brushes, drums, percussion
- Samuel Dixon – bass
- Ian Jennings – string bass

Technical

- Robin Baynton – engineer
- Dominic Monks – engineer, mixing
- Jose Gomes and Patrick Philips – assistant engineers

== Charts ==
Chart (2013)	Peak position
UK Albums Chart	8
