= Long Lost Suitcase =

Studio album by Tom Jones
- Released: 9 October 2015
- Genre: Blues; gospel; R&B
- Length: 42:09
- Label: Virgin EMI
- Producer: Ethan Johns

Tom Jones chronology
| Spirit in the Room (2012) | Long Lost Suitcase (2015) | Surrounded by Time (2021) |

Singles from Long Lost Suitcase
- 1. "Take My Love (I Want To Give It)" Released: 4 December 2015

Long Lost Suitcase is the 40th studio album released by Welsh singer Tom Jones, released on 9 October 2015. It is the third in a trilogy of albums, following 2010's Praise & Blame and Spirit in the Room in 2012. Like the previous two albums, it was produced by Ethan Johns.

This album comes as a CD in a jewel case with a 16-page booklet featuring rare photos from Jones' career.

== Track listing ==
| No. | Title | Writer(s) | Length |
|---|---|---|---|
| 1. | "Opportunity to Cry" | Willie Nelson | 2:43 |
| 2. | "Honey, Honey" (featuring Imelda May) | Joseph Ryan, Kenneth Pattengale | 2:23 |
| 3. | "Take My Love (I Want to Give It)" | John Mertis Jr. | 3:02 |
| 4. | "Bring It on Home" | Willie Dixon | 3:15 |
| 5. | "Everybody Loves a Train" | David Hidalgo, Louie Pérez | 4:28 |
| 6. | "Elvis Presley Blues" | David Rawlings, Gillian Welch | 3:14 |
| 7. | "He Was a Friend of Mine" | Traditional | 3:18 |
| 8. | "Factory Girl" | Mick Jagger, Keith Richards | 2:32 |
| 9. | "I Wish You Would" | Billy Boy Arnold | 4:13 |
| 10. | "'Til My Back Ain't Got No Bone" | Alvertis Isbell, Eddie Floyd | 4:51 |
| 11. | "Why Don't You Love Me Like You Used to Do?" | Hank Williams | 1:49 |
| 12. | "Tomorrow Night" | Sam Coslow, Wilhelm Grosz | 3:06 |
| 13. | "Raise a Ruckus" | Traditional | 3:15 |

== Reception ==
Professional ratings
Review scores
| Source | Rating |
|---|---|
| Evening Standard | 4/5 stars |
| The Guardian | 3/5 stars |
| RTÉ | 2/5 stars |
| The Scotsman | 4/5 stars |
| WalesOnline | favourable |
| Música Nueva | 4/5 stars |

Andre Paine, reviewing for the Evening Standard also gave it four stars, stating "At 75, Jones’s volcanic vocal still sounds majestic on an album that maintains the artistic rejuvenation of recent years." Fiona Shepherd in The Scotsman rated it the same. Nathan Bevan, reviewing it for WalesOnline was also positive, while The Guardian's Dave Simpson gave it three stars, calling it "slightly uneven". Paddy Kehoe, for RTÉ, was less enthusiastic, giving it two stars.

== Single ==
The track "Take My Love (I Want To Give It)", originally recorded by Little Willie John in 1961, was released as a single on 6 November 2015.

== Personnel ==
- Tom Jones – vocals
- Ethan Johns – electric & acoustic guitars, organ, clavinet, mellotron, bass, percussion, weissenhorn (1, 3–7, 9–13)
- Jeremy Stacey – drums (1, 3–5, 9–13)
- Ian Jennings – double bass (1, 3–4)
- Al Gare – double bass (1)
- Leon Mooney – acoustic guitar (2, 8)
- Mark McGovern – banjo (2, 8)
- Leslie Jones – mandolin (2, 8)
- Fiachra Cunningham – violin (2, 8)
- Imelda May – vocals (2)
- Andy Fairweather-Low – electric, acoustic & 12-string guitars, backing vocals (3–5, 9–13)
- Dave Bronze – bass (5, 9–13)

== Charts ==
| Chart (2015) | Peak position |
|---|---|
| Belgian Albums (Ultratop Flanders) | 75 |
| Dutch Albums (Album Top 100) | 74 |
| Irish Albums (IRMA) | 66 |
| UK Albums (OCC) | 17 |
