= Pain Killer (Turin Brakes song) =

2003 single by Turin Brakes

Single by Turin Brakes

from the album Ether Song
- B-side: "Where's My Army?"; "Little Brother" (demo)
- Released: 17 February 2003
- Length: 3:41
- Label: Source
- Songwriters: Olly Knights; Gale Paridjanian
- Producer: Tony Hoffer

Turin Brakes singles chronology
| "Long Distance" (2002) | "Pain Killer" (2003) | "Average Man" (2003) |

"Pain Killer" (also titled "Pain Killer (Summer Rain)") is a song written by Olly Knights and Gale Paridjanian, produced by Tony Hoffer, and recorded by British band Turin Brakes. It was included on Turin Brakes' second album, Ether Song (2003), and was released as the second single from the album in February 2003. The song debuted at its peak of number five on the UK Singles Chart, at which point the single's formats were deleted. Outside the United Kingdom, the song charted in Italy and the Netherlands at numbers 50 and 64, respectively.

== Track listings ==
UK CD single

1. "Pain Killer (Summer Rain)" (radio edit) – 3:41
2. "Where's My Army?" (home recording) – 2:32
3. "Little Brother" (demo version) – 5:15
4. "Pain Killer (Summer Rain)" (video) – 3:41

UK limited-edition 7-inch single

A. "Pain Killer" (radio edit)
B. "Little Brother" (demo version)

European limited-edition CD single

1. "Pain Killer (Summer Rain)" (radio edit) – 3:41
2. "Pain Killer (Summer Rain)" (video) – 3:41

== Personnel ==
Personnel are lifted from the UK CD single liner notes.

- Olly Knights – vocals, writing
- Gale Paridjanian – vocals, writing
- Justin Meldal-Johnsen – bass
- Brian Reitzell – drums
- Dave Palmer – keyboards
- Tony Hoffer – production, mixing
- S. Husky Höskulds – engineering
- Ben Drury – Turin Brakes logo and sleeve artwork
- William Bankhead – sleeve photography
- Kate Nielsen – artwork coordination

== Charts ==
| Chart (2003) | Peak position |
|---|---|
| Europe (Eurochart Hot 100) | 20 |
| Italy (FIMI) | 50 |
| Netherlands (Single Top 100) | 64 |
| Scotland Singles (OCC) | 4 |
| UK Singles (OCC) | 5 |

== Release history ==
| Region | Date | Format(s) | Label(s) | Ref(s). |
|---|---|---|---|---|
| United Kingdom | 17 February 2003 | 7-inch vinyl; CD | Source | |
| Australia | 31 March 2003 | CD | Source | |
| United States | 23 June 2003 | Triple A radio | Astralwerks | |
