= Late Night Tales: Turin Brakes =

Compilation album by Turin Brakes
- Released: 16 February 2004
- Length: 75:33
- Label: Azuli
- Producer: Turin Brakes

Turin Brakes chronology
The Optimist LP (2001)	Late Night Tales: Turin Brakes (2004)	Ether Song (2003)

Late Night Tales chronology
Jamiroquai (2003)	Turin Brakes (2004)	Four Tet (2004)

Late Night Tales: Turin Brakes is a DJ mix album, mixed by the English band Turin Brakes. It is the 11th in Late Night Tales' Late Night Tales / Another Late Night series, released on 16 February 2004. The album features an exclusive cover of the Rolling Stones' "Moonlight Mile."

Turin Brakes were approached to release a compilation in 2003. Since the release Turin Brakes have done several DJ sets in the London area.

== Track listing ==
1. "Last Night I Dreamt Of Mississippi" - Nicolai Dunger
2. "Midnight Cowboy" - John Barry
3. "Send In The Clouds" - Silver Jews
4. "Lagos Soundsystem" (featuring Henri Gaobi) - Les Barons
5. "A Walk In The Night" - Grant Green
6. "Blues Music" - G. Love & Special Sauce
7. "Dreamy Eyed Girl" - John Hammond
8. "Breaking Your Fall" - Chris Whitley
9. "Speed Trials" - Dave Palmer
10. "Magnolia" - J. J. Cale
11. "I Believe In You" - Talk Talk
12. "Short Tales Of The Black Forest" (featuring John McLaughlin) - Al Di Meola
13. "Cold Blooded Old Times" - Smog
14. "One And Only" - Gillian Welch
15. "A Pearl For Iona" - Jessica Lauren
16. "Moonlight Mile" - Turin Brakes
17. "The White City Part 4" - read by Brian Blessed
