= If Not Now, When? =

If Not Now, When? may refer to:

- "If not now, when?", a saying by Hillel the Elder
- If Not Now, When? (novel), a 1986 novel by Italian author Primo Levi
- If Not Now, When? (album), a 2011 album by Incubus, or the title track
- If Not Now, When? (EP), a 2022 EP by Russ
- If Not Now, When? (film), an American drama film
- "If Not Now, When?", a 2019 song by Allday from his album Starry Night Over the Phone

== See also ==
- IfNotNow, an American Jewish advocacy group
- That Was Then This Is Now (disambiguation)
- If Not Now Then When?, an album by Ethan Johns
- If Not Now Then When, an album by The Motels
- "If Not Now, Then When?", a single by King Gizzard & the Lizard Wizard from L.W.
