= Robert Vincent (musician) =

- Born: 1981 (age 44–45)
- Origin: Crosby, England
- Genres: Americana, blues, country
- Occupations: Singer; songwriter
- Years active: 2000–present
- Website: robertvincentmusic.com

Robert Vincent (born 1981) is an English singer-songwriter born in Crosby. Vincent's musical style falls within the Americana genre, drawing inspiration from a mix of country, Americana, blues, folk, and the sounds of 1970s English music. In addition to his eclectic influences, Vincent's music is also shaped by his Merseyside roots.

== Career ==
Vincent toured throughout 2012 and released several singles and EPs.

Vincent's debut album, Life in Easy Steps, was released by DB Industries on 28 January 2013. His next album, I'll Make the Most of My Sins, was released in February 2017.

In 2020, the album In This Town You're Owned, produced by Ethan Johns, was released. The album won UK Album of the Year at the 2021 UK Americana Awards.

The album Barriers was released in 2024 and the single Follow What You Love and Love Will Follow won the UK Song of the Year at the 2025 UK Americana Awards.

== Reception ==
Vincent was described by Andrew Harrison, editor of Q, as "the scouse Springsteen." Vincent was named UK Artist of the Year at the 2021 UK Americana Awards.

== Discography ==
Studio albums from Robert Vincent:

- Life in Easy Steps - 2013
- I'll Make The Most of My Sins - 2018
- In This Town You're Owned - 2020
- Barriers - 2024
