= Turin Brakes =

English rock band

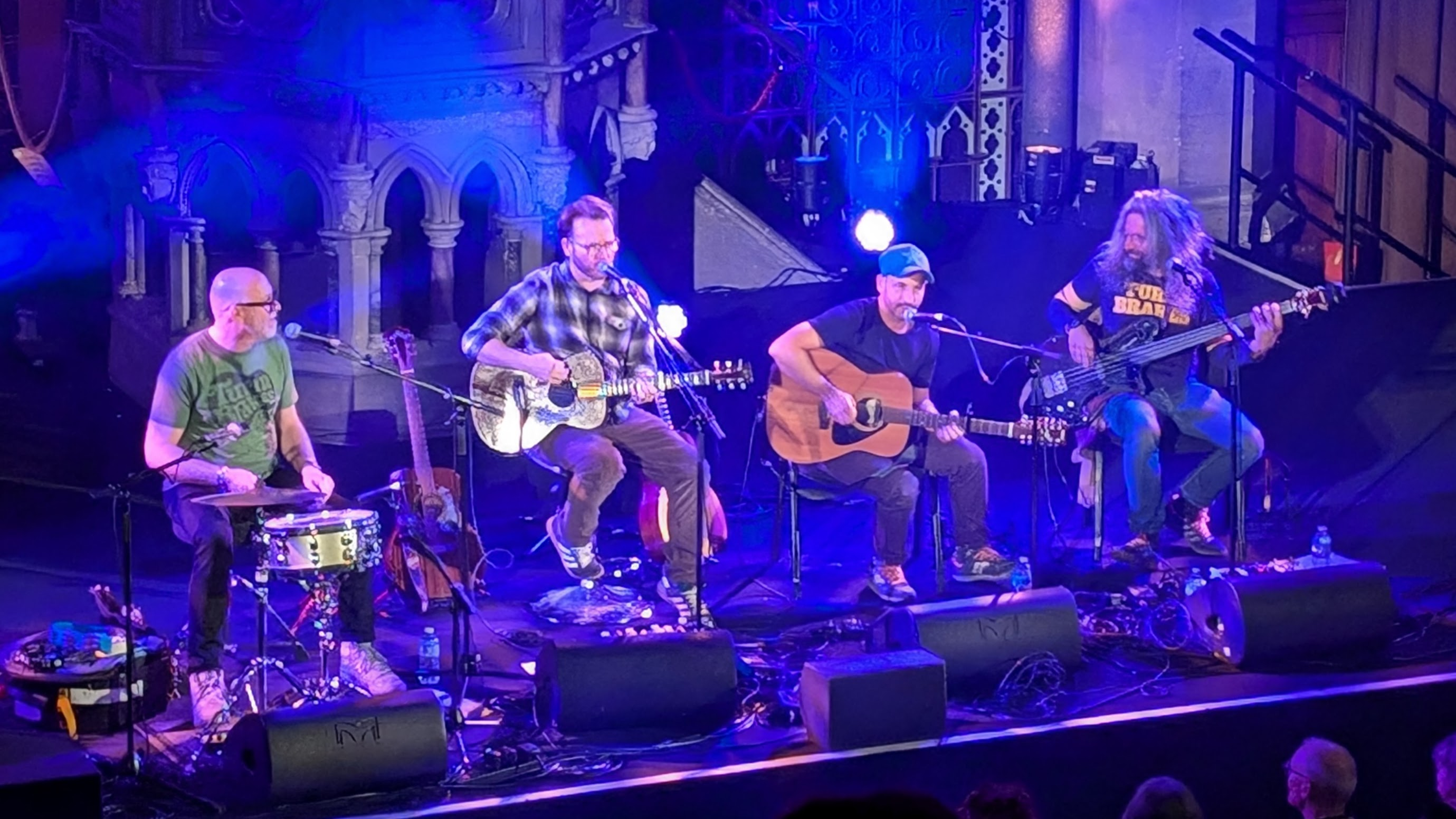
- Turin Brakes in concert, 2024

Background information
- Origin: Balham, London, England
- Genres: Folk rock, Indie rock
- Years active: 1999–present
- Labels: Source; Cooking Vinyl
- Members: Olly Knights; Gale Paridjanian; Rob Allum; Eddie Myer
- Past members: Phil Marten
- Website: Official site

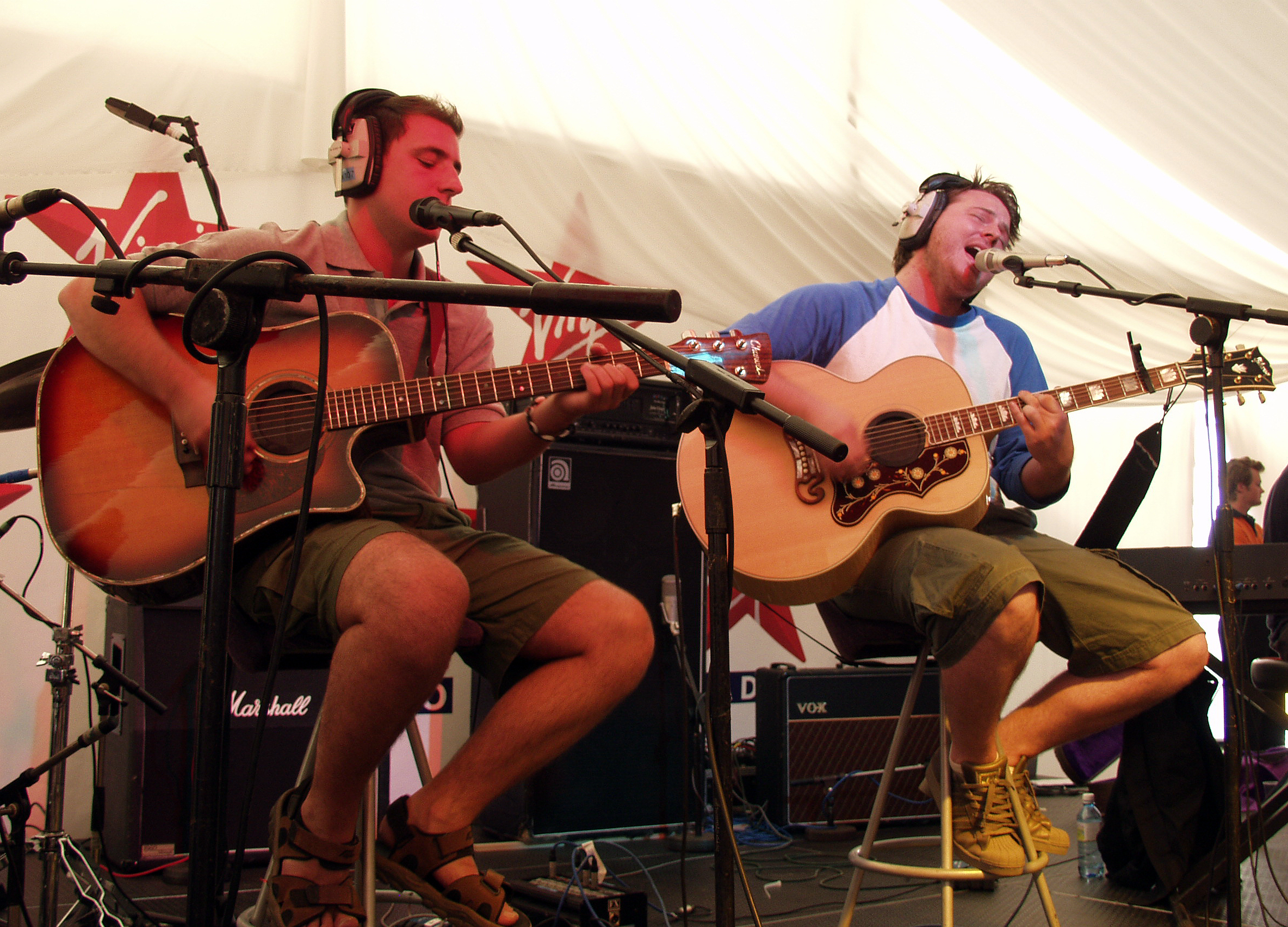
Turin Brakes in concert, 2003

Turin Brakes are an English band, comprising the original duo Olly Knights and Gale Paridjanian, and long-term collaborators Rob Allum and Eddie Myer. They had a UK top 5 hit in 2003 with their song "Painkiller (Summer Rain)". Since starting out in 1999, the band have sold about one million records worldwide. They are currently signed to Cooking Vinyl.

== History ==
=== 1999–2001: Formation and The Optimist LP ===
The band was started by long-time friends Knights and Paridjanian. The two met at a young age and spent much of their childhood together, both receiving guitars as Christmas presents at the age of 10. They split after Knights went to film school and Paridjanian formed 100 Moments, a London based experimental rock band with Canadian born guitarist and songwriter Michael Brennan. Later moving to Canada and attempting to form a band in Toronto, Ontario, Canada, they soon reunited and collaborated on what would later become their first EP, The Door, which was eventually released through Anvil Records in 1999 as a limited vinyl release. This led to the band attracting the attention of larger record labels. Source Records would eventually release two more EPs, The State of Things EP and Fight or Flight, prompting NME to proclaim "Turin Brakes inhabit a space which is entirely their own, fully formed and brutally emotive... give them the devotion they deserve."

Source reissued the song "The Door" before releasing their first album, The Optimist LP, in 2001. The album, which was released in the United States by Astralwerks, was greeted with critical praise and spawned several modestly successful UK singles, "Underdog (Save Me)" (reaching no. 39 in the UK Singles Charts ), Mind Over Money (reaching no. 31 ) and "Emergency 72", and received a nomination for the Mercury Music Prize. In August 2001, the album was certified Gold by the British Phonographic Industry. A planned tour of the United States opening for the Stereophonics and Matthew Jay, was cancelled due to the September 11 terrorist attacks. Still, the band played at over 80 venues in Europe and the United States that year.

=== 2002–2004: Ether Song and mainstream success ===
Early in 2002, the band started work on their second album. After demo sessions in Rye, United Kingdom, the band flew to Los Angeles, California to record with producer Tony Hoffer in the Summer of 2002. In October 2002, this resulted in the single Long Distance (reaching no. 31 ) and an arena tour supporting David Gray.

In February 2002, the band embarked on their biggest headline tour to date, covering 24 UK venues in a month, including two sold-out shows at Brixton Academy, a venue they frequently visited when growing up. On 1 March 2003, their single "Pain Killer" became their biggest hit to date, reaching the top 5 of the singles chart.

Turin Brakes' second album, Ether Song, was released on 3 March 2003. This album was a departure from the acoustic sound that had brought them success with their first album. The album was popular enough to reach number 4 in the UK Albums Chart upon its release and to be certified Gold by the British Phonographic Industry four days after the release, on 7 March 2003.

After the successful release, the record company sought to replicate the commercial success by releasing a third single from the album, Average Man. However, UK radio stations didn't embrace the single as they had with previous releases, and its chart performance (no. 35) was perceived as disappointing by fans and the record label.

The album's commercial performance created some tension between the band and their label. In fact, between tours in the United States (their own headline tour and supporting David Gray) in the Summer of 2003, the band recorded a new single for a re-release of Ether Song with Tony Hoffer. The first re-release of Ether Song, featuring an orange version of the cover and a single 5 Mile was released on 6 October 2003. 5 Mile charted higher than Average Man (no. 31) but was largely overlooked by UK radio stations. Overall, the album was re-released four times during its lifespan, and received various bonus discs between regions and versions. The band was on record as being unhappy with the way the record company was treating them and the fans regarding the release.

Following the success and stress of Ether Song, the band took a short break, but not before touring Australia and New Zealand and releasing a DJ mix album for Azuli Records' Late Night Tales series in February 2004. The mix album (2004) was a collection of some of their favourite songs and main influences, and also contained The Rolling Stones song "Moonlight Mile" as a cover. The band have done some DJ sets in the London area over the years.

The band spent the first half of 2004 writing and recording new material in their own studio, which they built in Brixton, London. That summer, they played a successful set at Somerset House, playing a selection of old and new material, including future singles Fishing For A Dream and Over And Over. Later that year, they found themselves part of the Band Aid 20 cast for the revamped Noughties take on Do They Know It’s Christmas, alongside Paul McCartney, Radiohead and Robbie Williams, giving them their only chart topper to date in the process.

=== 2005: JackInABox and Live at the Palladium ===
Their third album, Jackinabox, was released to critical acclaim in early June 2005. It was preceded by the single "Fishing for a Dream," which did not do as well as the band had hoped (charting at 32). Despite the lack of airplay or a hit single, JackInABox still sold quite well, entering the Top 10 of the UK Albums Chart in its first week and certified Silver by the BPI on 10 June 2005. The album was supported by the group's first full-band tour of the United States, as well as the single "Over and Over," which was serviced to U.S. radio.

Following the success of Jackinabox and its subsequent tour, a download-only album, Live at the Palladium (recorded in London) was released in November 2005. Released one day after the concert took place in London, it was available on the band's website. Later it was also released on iTunes and did well in the download charts. During the October / November 2005 tour, the band also sold the Red Moon EP. This acoustic EP featured a new (acoustic) version of "Red Moon", two new songs (live favourite Jet Trail and Love Is All You Deserve) and the Red Hot Chili Peppers cover "Breaking The Girl" (recorded at KCRW).

=== 2006–2008: Dark on Fire ===
The band spent the first half of 2006 writing new songs, occasionally performing both new and old work at small gigs across the UK. The band did an intimate tour in November 2006 to try out new material. In January 2007 the band entered a recording studio in London to record their fourth album with producer Ethan Johns. After three weeks the band took a break (on 29 January Paridjanian's wife gave birth to a daughter), but the sessions were resumed several weeks later in a bigger studio (also in London). On the last day of March 2007 the band announced that they had finished the recording sessions, and recorded 17 songs.

The new album, Dark on Fire, was released in the UK in September 2007, preceded by a download-only single. "Stalker". On 14 January 2008 another download-only single was released: "Something In My Eye". The b-side was a cover version of Cat Stevens' "Here Comes My Baby". Both singles failed to make an impact on the singles charts, but Dark on Fire did chart at no. 36 in the top 40.

=== 2008–2009: Bottled at Source and work with other artists ===
In spring 2008, the band were special guests on the Hotel Cafe Tour hosted by Tom McRae. Also, the band did an acoustic tour in Germany. During that summer, the band played various summer festivals. As of November 2008, the band are back in the studio recording new material. Also, the band have been working with and writing for Take That, resulting in the bonus-track "Here" on 2008's The Circus. They also worked with Pete Lawrie, Andy Steele, Dido and Lisa Mitchell.

In March 2009, the band announced they would make their live return later in the year with two acoustic shows at Folk in the Barn in Canterbury in May. In June 2009, it was announced that the band would be releasing a 'Best Of' album, to mark the tenth anniversary of their debut single "The Door", along with a festival slot at Latitude in late-July and a headline performance at London Theatre Royal, Drury Lane the following September. This album, Bottled at Source – The Best of the Source Years, was also their last album for the Source record label.

During the performance at Theatre Royal on 13 September, the band played brand-new songs off the untitled forthcoming album, which they hinted would come out in February 2010.

=== 2010–2012: Outbursts ===
Their fifth album, Outbursts, was eventually released on 1 March 2010 on their new label, Cooking Vinyl. Its release was followed by a European tour and a US and Canada tour. The download single released from this album was Sea Change. Throughout the summer of 2010 the band played several festivals in the United Kingdom and Italy, including Glastonbury 2010 and Summer Sundae.

In November 2011, the band toured the United Kingdom to celebrate the tenth anniversary of their debut album The Optimist LP. The band played the complete debut album in the correct order, apart from hidden track Three Days Old and a second set of more recent work, including new song Rescue Squad and their re-working of Mary Poppins song Chim Chim Cher-ee, which they released as a digital single to raise money for homeless charities. A live recording of their show at Koko in London on 11 November 2011 was released as a live album.

Throughout 2012, the band wrote new material and played intimate venues in the United Kingdom. In October 2012, Olly Knights released a solo album If Not Now When on Turin Brakes' own record label, The Complete ATOMIC. In November 2012, the band returned to their studio to record material for their sixth studio album.

=== 2013–2014: We Were Here ===
The band premiered a new song, called Sleeper, in Naples, Italy. Recording of their sixth album, We Were Here, started on Monday 11 March 2013 at Rockfield Studios with producer Ali Staton and was released 30 September 2013 on the Cooking Vinyl label. The album was trailed by lead single 'Time and Money' and followed by second single 'Guess You Heard' in April 2014. The album reached number 46 in the UK album charts. After the release of the album, the band played their biggest UK tour in over a decade.

In 2014, the band played the South by Southwest festival in Austin, Texas and toured the United Kingdom, Italy, Ireland and the Netherlands. In 2015, the band started work on their seventh studio album.

=== 2015–2017: Lost Property ===
On 2 November 2015 the band announced its seventh album Lost Property, recorded at Rockfield Studios with producer Ali Staton, would be released on 29 January 2016 and released the video for the track '96'. A song from the album, "Save You", appeared in the closing moments of the second episode, "First Day", of the ABC drama Designated Survivor on 28 September 2016.

=== 2018–2022: Invisible Storm ===
On 26 January 2018 the band released their eighth album Invisible Storm, recorded at Rockfield Studios with producer Ali Staton, well received by the fans and critics, the album featured a more commercial sound than some of their previous work. Singles released included, "Wait", "Life Forms" and "Lost In The Woods".

=== 2022-2025: Wide Eyed Nowhere ===
On 16 September, Turin Brakes released the album Wide Eyed Nowhere, which was recorded at Olly's garden studio, Twin Palms. The band wanted to focus on a natural and organic songwriting process. Singles included “Isolation”, “Into The Sun”, “Up for Grabs” and “World Like That”.

=== 2025–present: Spacehopper ===
On 23 May 2025, Spacehopper- the 10th studio album from the band was released. Recorded at the same studio as The Optimist LP, singles included "Spacehopper", "The Message" and "Old Habits".

== Sound ==
Turin Brakes have often been compared to many of the new acoustic movement bands spawned in the late 1990s such as Elbow, Starsailor, and the Norwegian band Kings of Convenience, whose 2001 album entitled Quiet Is the New Loud is a helpful indicator of the band's first album. With each record, Turin Brakes try to change their sound. While the first album features a lot of acoustic guitar, Ether Song featured more electric guitar and was, in total, a lot darker. The third album, Jackinabox, can be seen as a combination of the first two albums, with some funk influences.. While Dark on Fire featured a bigger sound produced by Ethan Johns, 2010's Outbursts can be seen as a return to the sound of The Optimist LP. Turin Brakes formerly performed live as a five-piece outfit to achieve a full band sound, and were joined on stage (and often also in the studio) by Rob Allum (drums), Phil Marten (keyboards) and Eddie Myer (bass). Following Marten's departure, they now perform as a four-piece band, with Gale's guitar playing being more prominent and more richly contributing to the live sound.

On 6 September 2012, all four Turin Brakes members played at a "Spirit of Talk Talk" evening at 229 Great Portland Street where they joined some former members of Talk Talk to play a few hits including It's My Life, with the band then playing a set of their own afterwards. Before playing the song "Painkiller" Gale announced to the audience that although it wouldn't be obvious to most people the song was heavily influenced by Talk Talk and by the work they did with producer Phill Brown in the Kent countryside some years ago.

== Discography ==
=== Studio albums ===
List of albums, with selected details and chart positions
Title	Details	Peak chart positions	
Title	Details	UK	AUS
The Optimist LP	Released: 2001; Label: Source/Astralwerks	27	—
Ether Song	Released: 2003; Label: Source/Astralwerks	4	99
JackInABox	Released: 2005; Label: Source/Astralwerks	9	—
Dark on Fire	Released: 2007; Label: Source/Astralwerks	36	—
Outbursts	Released: 2010; Label: Cooking Vinyl	64	—
We Were Here	Released: 2013; Label: Cooking Vinyl	46	—
Lost Property	Released: 2016; Label: Cooking Vinyl	31	—
Invisible Storm	Released: 2018; Label: Cooking Vinyl	37	—
Wide-Eyed Nowhere	Released: 2022; Label: Cooking Vinyl	78	—
Spacehopper	Released: 2025; Label: Cooking Vinyl	97	—

=== Live albums ===
- Live at the Palladium (Source/Astralwerks, 2005)
- The Optimist Live (2011)

=== Compilation albums ===
- Bottled at Source – The Best of the Source Years (Source/Astralwerks, 2009)

=== Mix albums ===
- Late Night Tales: Turin Brakes (Source/Azuli Records, 2004)

=== Extended plays ===
- The Door EP (Anvil, 1999) – 7"/CD
- The State of Things EP (Source, 2000) – 7"/CD
- Fight or Flight (Source, 2000) – 7"/CD
- NapsterLive (Napster, 2005) – Digital download
- The Red Moon EP (Source, 2005) – 7"/CD
- Something Out of Nothing EP (Source, 2007) – CD
- Everybody Knows Everyday's A Black Wicked Game (The Complete Atomic, 2010) – covers EP
- Xerox (The Complete Atomic, 2011) – covers EP with one original track
- We Were Here (Cooking Vinyl, 2013) – Spotify four-song release

=== Singles ===
List of singles, with selected chart positions
Year	Song	Label	Format	Album	UK Singles Chart
2001	"The Door"	Source	12"/7"/CD	The Optimist LP	67
2001	"Underdog (Save Me)"	Source	7"/CD	The Optimist LP	39
2001	"Mind Over Money"	Source	7"/CD	The Optimist LP	31
2001	"Emergency 72"	Source	7"/CD	The Optimist LP	41
2002	"Long Distance"	Source	7"/CD	Ether Song	22
2003	"Pain Killer (Summer Rain)"	Source	7"/CD	Ether Song	5
2003	"Average Man"	Source	7"/CD/DVD	Ether Song	35
2003	"5 Mile (These Are the Days)"	Source	7"/CD	Ether Song	31
2005	"Fishing for a Dream"	Source	7"/CD	Jackinabox	32
2005	"Over and Over"	Source	7"/CD	Jackinabox	62
2007	"Stalker"	Source	Download	Dark On Fire	-
2008	"Something In My Eye"	Source	Download	Dark On Fire	-
2010	"Sea Change"	Cooking Vinyl	Download	Outbursts	-
2013	"Time and Money"	Cooking Vinyl	Download	We Were Here	-
2015	"96"	Cooking Vinyl	Download	Lost Property	-
2015	"Keep Me Around"	Cooking Vinyl	Download	Lost Property	-
"—" denotes a recording that did not chart or was not released.

=== Compilations ===
Turin Brakes tracks have appeared on the following compilation CDs:

Year	Compilation	Track
2001	The Album Vol. 1	"The Door"
2001	The Album Vol. 2	"Emergency 72"
2001	Reloaded Vol. 3	"Underdog (Save Me)"
2002	Acoustic Vol. 1	"Underdog (Save Me)"
2002	The Album Vol. 3	"Underdog (Save Me)"
2002	Acoustic Vol. 2	"Emergency 72"
2003	Love Music Hate Racism	"Angel of the Morning"
2004	The Best Bands 2004	"Painkiller"
2004	Music From the OC: Mix 1	"Rain City"
2004	The Best Bands in the World...Ever	"Long Distance"
2005	The Album: Music From EMI	"Painkiller"
2005	The Album Vol. 6	"Fishing For a Dream"
2005	Acoustic Vol. 5	"Future Boy"
2005	NME Presents The Essential Bands	"Fishing For a Dream"
2005	Ministry of Sound's Chillout Sessions 5	"Feeling Oblivion"
2006	The Last Kiss Soundtrack	"Painkiller"
2006	The Acoustic Album	"Painkiller"
2007	The Songs	"Painkiller"
2007	Mojo Presents: Stoned	"Moonlight_Mile_(song)"
2007	The Saturday Sessions: The Dermot O'Leary Show	"Breaking the Girl"
	Just Great Songs	"They Can't Buy the Sunshine"
