= That Was Then This Is Now =

That Was Then This Is Now may refer to:

== Music ==
- That Was Then, This Is Now (Tha Dogg Pound album), 2009
- That Was Then, This Is Now (Josh Wilson album), 2015
- That Was Then, This Is Now, Vol. 1 (1999) and That Was Then, This Is Now, Vol. 2 (2000), studio albums by American rapper Frost
- That Was Then, This Is Now, 2002 compilation album by Andy Timmons
- That Was Then, This Is Now, 2010 album by Chasen
- That Was Then, This Is Now, 2011 album by the James Cleaver Quintet
- "That Was Then, This Is Now" (song), a 1986 song by the Mosquitos, and covered by the Monkees

== Other uses ==
- That Was Then, This Is Now, a 1971 novel by S. E. Hinton
- That Was Then... This Is Now, a 1985 film based on Hinton's novel
- That Was Then, This Is Now (radio series), a BBC Radio 2 comedy sketch series

== See also ==
- "That Was Then but This Is Now", a 1983 song by ABC
- That was Now, This is Then, a 2022 novel by Michael Z. Williamson
- If Not Now Then When?, an album by Ethan Johns
- If Not Now Then When, an album by The Motels
- If Not Now, When? (disambiguation)
