= Ethan Johns =

English record producer, songwriter, and musician (born 1969)

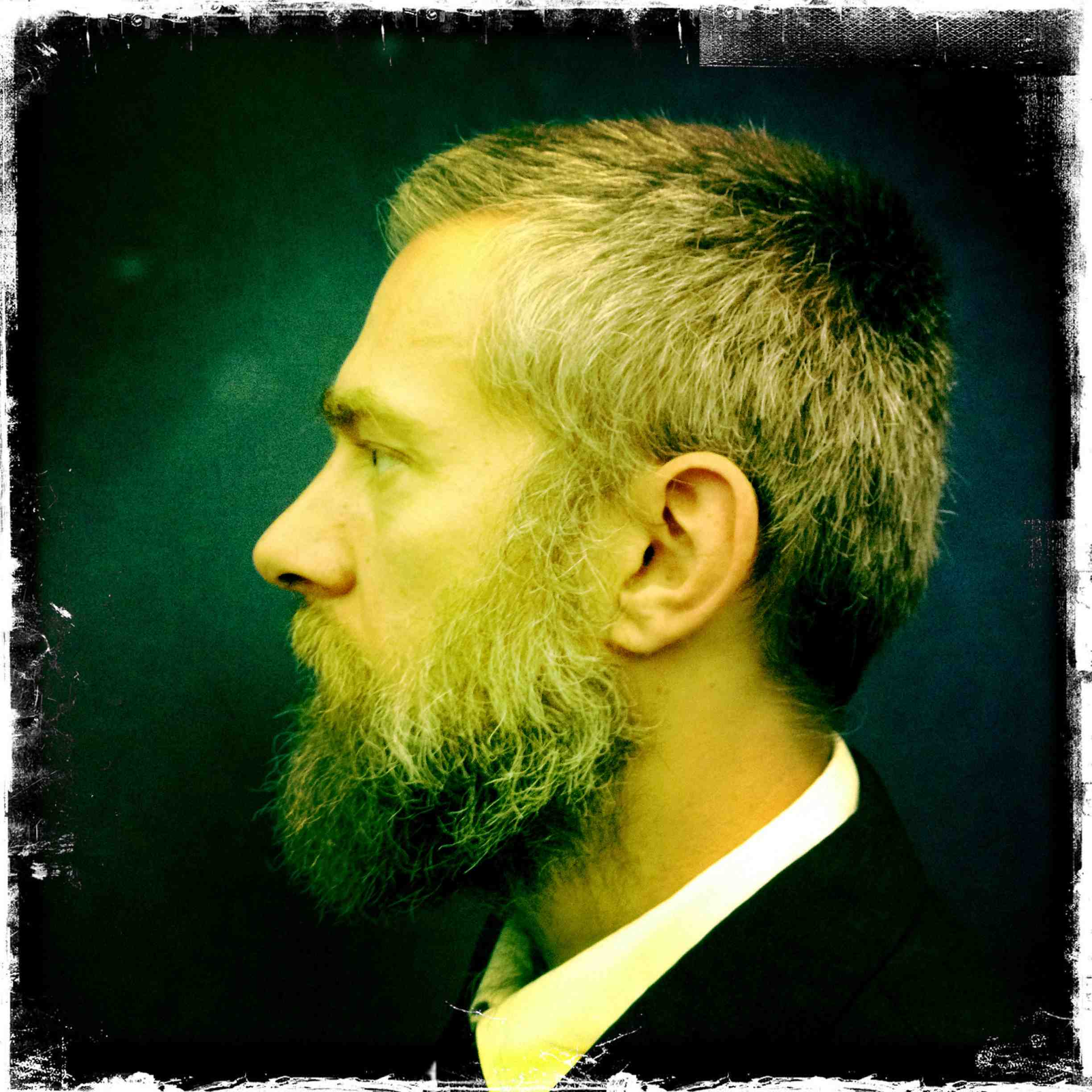
- Johns in 2014

Background information
- Born: Ethan Thomas Robert Johns; 1969 (age 56–57); Merton, London, England
- Genres: Rock, pop, folk, indie rock, indie pop
- Occupations: Record producer, songwriter, mixer, engineer
- Label: Three Crows
- Website: ethanjohns.com

Ethan Thomas Robert Johns (born 1969) is an English record producer, engineer, mixer, songwriter, and multi-instrumentalist. Artists he has worked with include Robert Vincent, Ryan Adams, Kings of Leon, Paul McCartney, Ray LaMontagne, Tom Jones, Kaiser Chiefs, Rufus Wainwright, The Boxer Rebellion, Crowded House, Turin Brakes, Lauren Hoffman, The Vaccines, Laura Marling, The Staves, and Crosby, Stills and Nash. In 2012, he won the Brit Award for Best British Producer.

== Biography ==
Johns was born in 1969 in Merton, London, and is the son of record producer and engineer Glyn Johns (The Rolling Stones, Eric Clapton, Led Zeppelin, and The Who).

Although Johns is primarily a record producer, mixer and engineer, the multi-instrumentalist has also toured with acts such as Emmylou Harris, Ryan Adams, Ray LaMontagne, and Tom Jones. He owns the indie record label Three Crows Music. Johns also runs Three Crows Records within Warner/Atlantic.

Johns released his debut solo album Independent Years (1991) followed by If Not Now Then When? on vinyl in November 2012, which was later released on other formats in February 2013. His second album titled The Reckoning was released in mid-2014; it was produced by Ryan Adams. His third album Silver Liner was released in November 2015. His fourth and most recent album Anamnesis was released in 2018. Johns spent 15 years in Los Angeles as a record producer and musician, but currently lives and continues to make records in England.

== Discography ==
=== Solo discography ===
- Independent Years (1991)
- If Not Now Then When? (2012)
- The Reckoning (2014)
- Silver Liner (2015)
- Anamnesis (2018)

=== Selected production credits ===
| Artist | Year | Album | Producer | Engineer | Mixer | Musician |
|---|---|---|---|---|---|---|
| Robert Vincent | 2024 | Barriers | check | | check | check |
| Tom Chaplin | 2022 | Midpoint | check | | check | check |
| Tom Jones | 2021 | Surrounded by Time | check | | check | check |
| Mary Chapin Carpenter | 2020 | The Dirt and the Stars | check | | | check |
| Laura Marling | 2020 | Song for Our Daughter | check | | check | check |
| Robert Vincent | 2019 | In This Town You're Owned | check | | check | check |
| Mary Chapin Carpenter | 2018 | Sometimes Just the Sky | check | | check | check |
| White Denim | 2016 | Stiff | check | | | |
| Boy & Bear | 2015 | Limit of Love | check | | check | |
| Tom Jones | 2015 | Long Lost Suitcase | check | | check | check |
| Ethan Johns | 2015 | Silver Liner | | | | check |
| Ethan Johns | 2014 | The Reckoning | | | | check |
| Laura Marling | 2013 | Once I Was an Eagle | check | check | check | check |
| Paul McCartney | 2013 | New | check | | | check |
| The Vaccines | 2012 | Come of Age | check | | check | |
| Ethan Johns | 2012 | If Not Now Then When | check | check | | check |
| Tom Jones | 2012 | Spirit in the Room | check | | check | |
| The Staves | 2012 | Dead & Born & Grown | co-P | | co-M | |
| The Staves | 2012 | The Motherlode: EP | co-P | | co-M | |
| Kaiser Chiefs | 2011 | Future Is Medieval/Start the Revolution Without Me | check | check | check | |
| Priscilla Ahn | 2011 | When You Grow Up | check | check | check | |
| Michael Kiwanuka | 2011 | "I'll Get Along" & "I Won't Lie" from Home Again | check | check | check | |
| The Boxer Rebellion | 2011 | The Cold Still | check | check | check | |
| The London Souls | 2011 | The London Souls | check | check | check | |
| Laura Marling | 2011 | A Creature I Don't Know | check | check | check | |
| Laura Marling | 2010 | I Speak Because I Can | check | check | check | |
| Tom Jones | 2010 | Praise & Blame | check | check | check | |
| Paolo Nutini | 2009 | Sunny Side Up | check | check | check | |
| Howie Payne | 2009 | Bright Light Ballads | check | check | check | check |
| Ray LaMontagne | 2008 | Gossip in the Grain | check | check | check | check |
| Turin Brakes | 2007 | Dark on Fire | check | check | check | |
| Joe Cocker | 2007 | Hymn for My Soul | check | check | check | |
| Crowded House | 2007 | Time on Earth | check | check | check | check |
| Kings of Leon | 2007 | Because of the Times | check | check | check | |
| Ray LaMontagne | 2006 | Till the Sun Turns Black | check | check | check | |
| Gerling | 2006 | 4 | check | check | check | |
| Razorlight | 2006 | Razorlight | check | check | check | |
| Ryan Adams | 2005 | 29 | check | check | check | |
| Kings of Leon | 2004 | Aha Shake Heartbreak | check | check | check | |
| Ray LaMontagne | 2004 | Trouble | check | check | check | check |
| Ben Kweller | 2004 | On My Way | check | check | check | |
| Kings of Leon | 2003 | Youth & Young Manhood | check | check | check | |
| Kings of Leon | 2003 | Holy Roller Novocaine | check | check | check | |
| Leona Naess | 2003 | Leona Naess | check | check | check | |
| Bernie Leadon | 2003 | Mirror | check | check | check | check |
| Jayhawks | 2003 | Rainy Day Music | check | check | check | check |
| Ours | 2002 | Precious | check | check | check | check |
| Tift Merritt | 2002 | Bramble Rose | check | check | check | check |
| Counting Crows | 2002 | Hard Candy | check | check | check | |
| Ryan Adams | 2001 | Gold | check | check | check | check |
| Rufus Wainwright | 2001 | "California" from Poses | check | check | | check |
| Whiskeytown | 2001 | Pneumonia | check | check | check | check |
| Phil Cody | 2001 | Big Slow Mover | check | check | check | check |
| Glen Phillips | 2001 | Abulum | check | check | check | check |
| Ryan Adams | 2000 | Heartbreaker | check | check | check | check |
| Robyn Hitchcock | 1999 | Jewels for Sophia | | check | check | check |
| Victoria Williams | 1998 | Musings of a Creekdipper | | check | check | check |
| Chris Stills | 1998 | 100 Year Thing | check | check | check | check |

=== As musician ===
- Drums, guitar, mandolin on John Hiatt's Stolen Moments (1990)
- Drums on Fish's Internal Exile (1991)
- Guitar on Mike Peters & The Poets of Justice "Exodus Tour" (1992)
- Guitar, Drums, Producer, on Andy Stine's Time Waits (1993).
- Electric and acoustic guitar, drums, percussion, and mandocello on Crosby, Stills and Nash's After the Storm (1994)
- Drums on Joe Satriani – Joe Satriani "Luminous Flesh Giants" (1995)
- Guitar, drums, percussion, omnichord, EBow, mandocello on Emmylou Harris "Red Dirt Girl" (2000)
- Guitar, drums, percussion, mandocello, marksaphone, optigon, dulcimer, synth bass on Emmylou Harris/Linda Ronstadt "Western Wall, The Tucson Sessions" (1999)
- Drums, bass, mandolin, mandocello, keyboards, percussion and guitars on Whiskeytown's Pnenmonia (2001) – also producer
- Drums, guitar, mandocello, percussion, Hammond organ, vocals on Ryan Adams Gold (2001) – also producer
- Drums and guitar on Luthea Salom Out of Without (2001)
- Guitar, percussion on Tift Merritt Bramble Rose (2002) – also producer
- Percussion, piano, drums, harmonium, bass and additional guitars on Ray Lamontagne Trouble (2004) – also producer
- Drums on Dave Palmer's Romance (2006) – also producer
- Drums on Ryan Adams 29 (2005) – also producer
- Drums in the Backing band for the Ray Lamontagne Tour for Gossip in the Grain
- Hammond organ, celesta, mandolin, mellotron, omnichord, electric and acoustic guitars, ukulele, dobro, mandocello, bass, tic tac bass, optigan, percussion on Paolo Nutini Sunny Side Up (2009) – also producer
- Drums on Howard Eliott Payne "Bright Light Ballads" (2009) – also producer
- Conductor of BBC Concert Orchestra on BBC Music's cover of God Only Knows (2014) (also producer)
- Drums, Guitar, Guitar (12 String Electric), Guitar (Acoustic), Guitar (Electric), Guitar (Leslie), Musician, Shaker, Slide Guitar, Tiple, Vocal Harmony on Benmont Tench / You Should Be So Lucky (2014)
