= Silver Liner =

Studio album by Ethan Johns
- Released: November 27, 2015
- Recorded: The Sesh Pit
- Genre: Folk rock
- Label: Three Crows Records
- Producer: Jeremy Stacey

Ethan Johns chronology
The Reckoning (2014)	Silver Liner (2015)

Silver Liner is the third studio album by English multi-instrumentalist and record producer Ethan Johns, released on November 27, 2015, on Johns' own label, Three Crows Records. Produced by drummer Jeremy Stacey, Johns was accompanied on the album by The Black Eyed Dogs; a backing band including Stacey, pedal steel guitarist B. J. Cole and bass guitarist Nick Pini.

The album features contributions from the Eagles' Bernie Leadon and singer-songwriter Gillian Welch.

== Track listing ==
All tracks are written by Ethan Johns.

No.	Title	Length
1.	"Silver Liner"	6:11
2.	"The Sun Hardly Rises"	4:08
3.	"I Don't Mind"	4:09
4.	"Juanita"	3:24
5.	"It Won't Always Be This Way"	3:24
6.	"Open Your Window"	7:36
7.	"Six and Nine"	8:36
8.	"Dark Fire"	3:10
9.	"I'm Coming Home"	3:40

== Personnel ==
=== Ethan Johns & the Black Eyed Dogs ===
- Ethan Johns - vocals, guitars
- Jeremy Stacey - drums, backing vocals, arrangements (5)
- B.J. Cole - pedal steel guitar
- Nick Pini - bass

=== Additional musicians ===
- Gillian Welch - vocals (1, 4)
- Richard Causon - accordion (3)
- Bernie Leadon - vocals (4)
- Everton Nelson - violin (5)
- Tom Pigott Smith - violin (5)
- Oli Langford - viola (5)
- Ian Burdge - cello - (5)

=== Recording personnel ===
- Jeremy Stacey - producer, engineer, mixing

=== Artwork ===
- Trevor Moss - cover art
