= The Staves =

English indie folk band

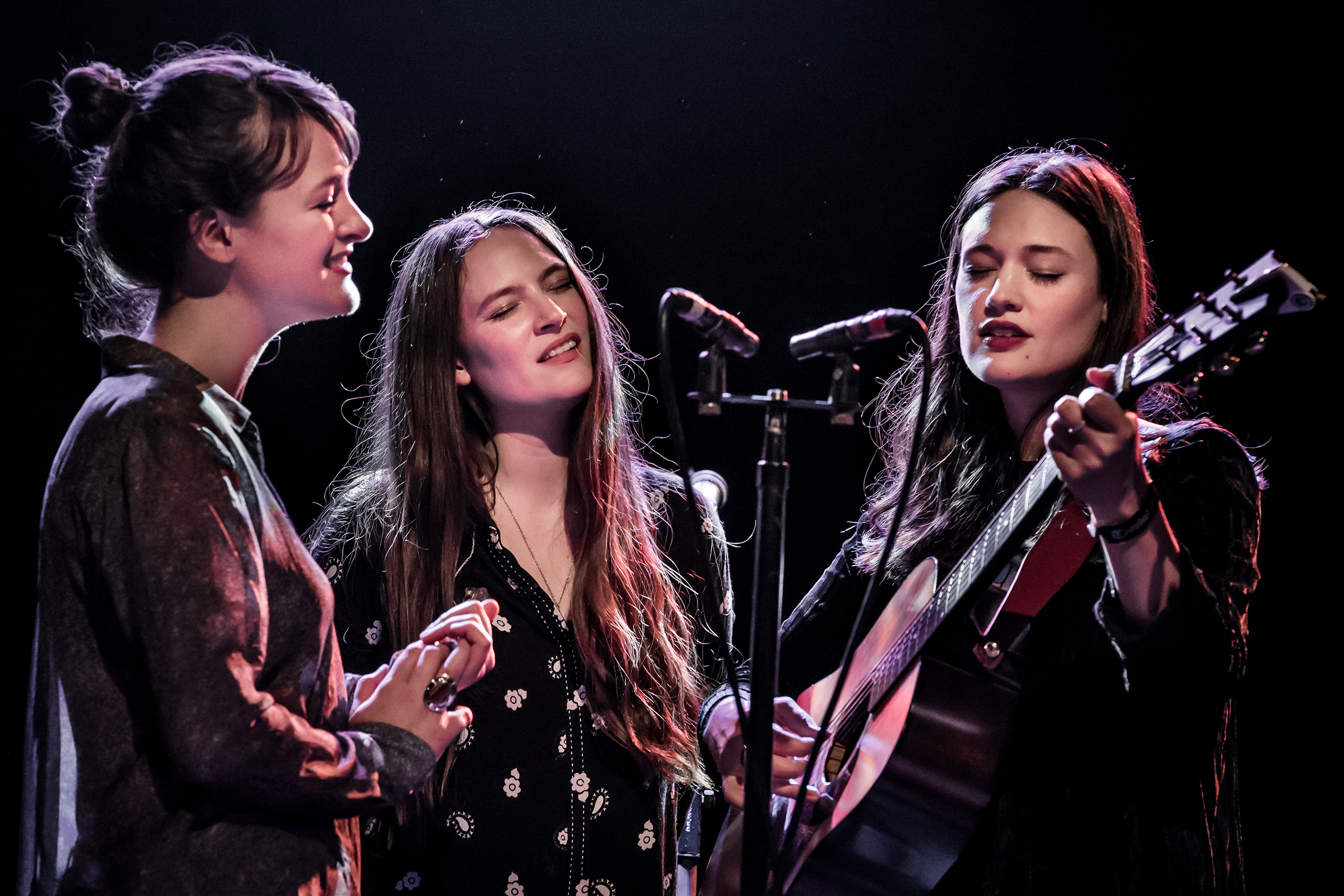
- The Staves in 2017

Background information
- Origin: Watford, Hertfordshire, England
- Genres: Folk rock • Indie folk
- Years active: 2009–present
- Label: Atlantic Records
- Members: Jessica Staveley-Taylor; Camilla Staveley-Taylor
- Past members: Emily Staveley-Taylor
- Website: www.thestaves.com

The Staves are an English indie folk duo of sisters Jessica and Camilla Staveley-Taylor from Watford, Hertfordshire, England. Formerly, their third sister Emily was also a member of the band.

== Career ==
The Staves began performing together at open-mic nights in Watford hosted by a local pub, The Horns. Originally performing as The Staveley-Taylors, the trio later changed their name to The Staves.

The group appeared on the Tom Jones album Praise and Blame, released in July 2010. They supported Mt. Desolation on their UK tour in late 2010. Jessica Staveley-Taylor also performed as part of Mt. Desolation and provided vocals for their eponymous album. The Staves released the Live at Cecil Sharp House EP and the Mexico EP in 2011, and appeared on Fionn Regan's third studio album, 100 Acres of Sycamore.

The Staves toured in the United States while supporting The Civil Wars in January 2012. They followed these appearances with performances at South by Southwest and a tour in March and April with Bear's Den, Nathaniel Rateliff and Ben Howard. This tour was the subject of the film, Austin to Boston, a documentary by Marcus Haney. The band supported Bon Iver on their May and June 2012 US and Canadian tour.

The band's debut album, Dead & Born & Grown, was released in November 2012 and produced by Glyn Johns and Ethan Johns.

An excerpt from their performance of "Facing West" on Later... with Jools Holland was featured on the This is BBC Two promotional programme.

The second album, If I Was, was released 23 March 2015 on Atlantic Records in the UK/EU and on 31 March on Nonesuch Records in the US; the record was produced by Justin Vernon of Bon Iver. The album debuted at number 14 on the UK Albums Chart. In July 2015, the Staves performed with Bon Iver as guest artists along with Colin Stetson, yMusic, and No BS! Brass for Bon Iver's return to the stage as part of the Eaux Claires Festival in Eau Claire, Wisconsin. They have also performed as the warm-up act for Florence and the Machine on Florence's How Big Tour supporting How Big, How Blue, How Beautiful.

The Staves joined the live line-up of Bon Iver for the latter's Asia tour in late February and early March 2016.

On 24 November 2017, The Staves released The Way is Read − an album created in conjunction with the New York-based chamber music ensemble yMusic. This album is available on vinyl, via the streaming service TIDAL in both normal and high quality MQA (Master Quality Authenticated) formats, and as an MP3 download. There is no CD version available.

In October and November 2018, they supported First Aid Kit on their Rebel Heart tour.

In January 2020, the Staves announced that Emily Staveley-Taylor would not take part in touring, following the birth of her daughter.

In March 2020, the Staves announced they would be performing at the Glastonbury Festival in 2020. But due to concerns over the 2019–20 coronavirus pandemic, the festival had to be cancelled.

On 5 February 2021, their third studio album Good Woman was released via Atlantic Records UK and Nonesuch Records. The album was produced by John Congleton and charted at number 13 in the UK Albums Chart.

In November 2023, the Staves announced their fifth LP, All Now, and released the title track, having previously shared another song from the record, "You Held It All". The album will be their first as a two-piece, after the departure of Emily Staveley-Taylor.

On July 18 2026 they performed at the BBC Proms 'Prog Rock' night singing songs by Genesis, Yes and Supertramp.

== Personal lives ==
The sisters learned to play guitar from their father while growing up in Watford. As children, they aspired to create a sketch comedy television programme together. They enjoy Guinness and are vocal in challenging tropes about sensitive wilderness-bound artists that dominate modern folk music culture.

In addition to touring with Bon Iver and producing If I Was with Justin Vernon, the sisters have become friends with the Wisconsin-born musician.

In mid 2018, the sisters' mother, Jean, a former teacher who had encouraged them to follow their dream of making music, died.

In 2019, Emily became a mother to a daughter called Margo.

== Discography ==
=== Studio albums ===
Title	Details	Peak chart positions		
Title	Details	UK	BEL (FL)	NL
Dead & Born & Grown	Released: 12 November 2012; Label: Warner Music; Format: Digital download, CD, LP	42	186	—
If I Was	Released: 23 March 2015; Label: Atlantic Records; Format: Digital download, CD, LP	14	92	55
The Way is Read (with yMusic)	Released: 24 November 2017; Label: Nonesuch Records; Format: Digital download, LP	—	—	—
Good Woman	Released: 5 February 2021; Label: Atlantic Records; Format: Digital download, CD, LP	13	—	—
All Now	Released: 22 March 2024; Label: Communion; Format: Digital download, CD, LP	32	—	—
"—" denotes a recording that did not chart or was not released.

=== Live albums ===
Title	Details
Dead & Born & Grown & Live	Released: 16 July 2013; Label: Atlantic Records; Format: Digital download

=== Extended plays ===
Title	Details
Facing West	Released: 2010; Label: Daddy Max Records; Format: Digital download
Live at Cecil Sharp House	Released: 7 October 2011; Label: Atlantic Records; Format: Digital download
Mexico	Released: 2 December 2011; Label: Atlantic Records; Format: Digital download
The Motherlode	Released: 13 April 2012; Label: Atlantic Records; Format: Digital download
Blood I Bled	Released: 28 October 2014; Label: Atlantic Records; Format: Digital download
Sleeping In A Car	Released: 13 May 2016; Label: Atlantic Records; Format: Digital download
Pine Hollow (Live)	Released: 2018; Label: Atlantic Records; Format: Digital download

=== Singles ===
Title	Year	Album
"Mexico"	2011	Mexico
"The Motherlode"	2012	Dead & Born & Grown
"Tongue Behind My Teeth"	2012	Dead & Born & Grown
"Facing West"	2013	Dead & Born & Grown
"Steady"	2014	If I Was
"Blood I Bled"	2014	If I Was
"Sleeping in a Car"	2016	Sleeping in a Car
"Tired as Fuck / Train Tracks"	2017	Non-album singles
"Home Alone, Too"	2018	Non-album singles
"White Roses" (with Flyte)	2019	Non-album singles
"Nazareth"	2020	Non-album singles
"Trying"	2020	Good Woman
