= Back in the Crowd =

Single by Tom Waits

from the album Bad as Me
- Released: September 27, 2011
- Genre: Rock, Latin
- Length: 2:49
- Label: ANTI-, Epitaph
- Songwriters: Tom Waits, Kathleen Brennan
- Producers: Tom Waits, Kathleen Brennan

Tom Waits singles chronology
| "Bad as Me" (2011) | "Back in the Crowd" (2011) |

"Back in the Crowd" is a song by American rock musician Tom Waits. It is the second single and seventh track from Waits' seventeenth studio album, Bad as Me. Written and produced by Waits and his wife Kathleen Brennan, the song was released on September 27, 2011 as a digital download via iTunes and Spotify.

== Music ==
"Back in the Crowd" is a guitar-driven Latin-influenced midtempo ballad. It features guitar work from Los Lobos guitarist and vocalist David Hidalgo and longtime collaborator Marc Ribot.

Tom Waits described the song as "an old fashioned jukebox tune for a slow dance with your girl (or guy)."

== Critical reception ==
Upon its release, the song received mainly positive reviews. Thom Jurek of Allmusic described the song as "the wasted lover's plea in the West Texas mariachi." Filter magazine wrote: "the song is obviously short and oftentimes tinged with bittersweetness", also adding that "Waits' deep croon evokes the sadness found in the song's mellow melody and lyrics." Luke Larsen of Paste magazine praised the song, reporting that "the song sort of just casually shows up and then disappears, but its mood is infectious." Katie Hasty of Hitfix described the song as a "The Southwestern, nylon-string-enhanced loner ballad" and "a trending bawler," also further explaining that "she just slow-danced by herself and had a good cry." Michael Roffman of Consequence of Sound indicated that "the song doesn’t sound like a track that’s on an album titled Bad as Me", while commenting that it is "most likely something your grandparents danced to after the war."

== Personnel ==
- Tom Waits - vocals, guitar, production, writing credits
- Marc Ribot – guitar
- Casey Waits – drums
- David Hidalgo - guitar, percussion
- James Whiton – bass
- Kathleen Brennan – production, writing credits

== Chart positions ==
| Chart (2011) | Peak position |
|---|---|
| Belgium (Ultratop Flanders) | 73 |
