= We Were Here (Turin Brakes album) =

2013 album by Turin Brakes

Studio album by Turin Brakes
- Released: 30 September 2013
- Genre: Folk rock
- Label: Cooking Vinyl
- Producer: Turin Brakes & Ali Staton

Turin Brakes chronology
The Optimist Live (2012)	We Were Here (2013)

Professional ratings
Review scores
Source	Rating
Louder Than War	9/10 stars
motor.de	4/5 stars

We Were Here is the sixth studio album by English rock band Turin Brakes and second released on 30 September 2013 through Cooking Vinyl. It was recorded at Rockfield Studios and engineered and mixed by Ali Staton and produced by Turin Brakes and Ali Staton. It was released on 30 September 2013.

== Track listing ==
All tracks are written by Olly Knights and Gale Paridjanian.

We Were Here track listing
No.	Title	Length
1.	"Time and Money"	3:48
2.	"We Were Here"	3:41
3.	"Dear Dad"	4:02
4.	"Blindsided Again"	5:51
5.	"Part of the World"	4:01
6.	"Stop the World"	4:26
7.	"Guess You Heard"	4:37
8.	"No Mercy"	5:58
9.	"Sleeper"	4:50
10.	"Inbetween"	4:43
11.	"Erase Everything"	4:16
12.	"Goodbye"	4:42

== Charts ==
Chart performance for We Were Here
Chart (2013)	Peak position
UK Albums (OCC)	46
