= Good Woman (The Staves album) =

Studio album by The Staves
- Released: 5 February 2021
- Genres: Folk; country
- Length: 45:31
- Label: Atlantic UK
- Producer: John Congleton

The Staves chronology
The Way is Read (2017)	Good Woman (2021)

Singles from Good Woman
- 1. "Trying" Released: 10 September 2020; 2. "Good Woman" Released: 21 October 2020; 3. "Satisfied" Released: 3 December 2020; 4. "Devotion" Released: 21 January 2021

Professional ratings
Aggregate scores
Source	Rating
AnyDecentMusic?	7.8/10
Metacritic	80/100
Review scores
Source	Rating
AllMusic	3.5/5 stars
Clash	8/10
DIY	4/5 stars
Exclaim!	7/10
The Guardian	4/5 stars
MusicOMH	4/5 stars
NME	4/5 stars
Paste	7.8/10
Pitchfork	6.9/10
Under the Radar	8/10

Good Woman is the fourth studio album by the English band the Staves. It was released on 5 February 2021 by Atlantic Records UK in the UK and Nonesuch Records worldwide.

== Background ==
In an interview with Clash, the Staves noted how they finished recording the album in March 2020, but held off on releasing it due to the COVID-19 pandemic:

"We were getting ready with our band to start touring the album and we did a handful of shows in the UK right up to the lockdown being announced. We did the 6Music Festival in Camden in March and within like a few days after that everything went into lockdown. It's been really frustrating postponing it and rethinking it and eventually we just said, 'this has to come out!' We didn't want it to be this never-ending postponing album."

== Release ==
The Staves announced their first album in six years on 21 October 2020, with the help of Grammy Award winning producer John Congleton.

=== Singles ===
On 10 September 2020, the Staves released the first single "Trying". Of the single, Camilla Staveley-Taylor explained that she wanted to write a song "about the state of things in the world and how broken our ability to communicate with each other had become as a society, but it became impossible as I was writing to separate my personal life from the broader message. I feel like trying is what we spend most of our lives doing really. Just trying our best. Trying to be better, to make things work."

The band's second single, the title track "Good Woman" was released on 21 October 2020. Paste named the single as their Top 8 Best Songs of the Week for 23 October 2020.

The third single "Satisfied" was released on 3 December 2020.

On 21 January 2021, the fourth single "Devotion" was released. The band released a statement of the single: "This song came from a feeling of being totally at the mercy of someone else. Being a passenger and never a driver in any situation. Being blinded by devotion and unable to navigate the way out."

== Tour ==
In support of the album, the band is scheduled to go on tour of the UK in September 2021. The Good Woman Tour begins at Brangwyn Hall in Swansea, Wales on 23 September 2021, and finishes at the O2 Academy in Bristol, England on October 12.

== Critical reception ==
Good Woman was met with "generally favorable" reviews from critics. At Metacritic, which assigns a weighted average rating out of 100 to reviews from mainstream publications, this release received an average score of 80 based on 14 reviews. Aggregator website AnyDecentMusic? gave the release a 7.8 out of 10 based on a critical consensus of 17 reviews.

Writing for AllMusic, Marcy Donelson wrote: "Despite subtle shifts in arrangements, the songs of Good Woman share a certain world-weariness that's balanced with a refreshing self-assurance that never loses its composure." Haydon Spenceley of Clash gave the release an eight out of 10, and said: "Still in place are the ubiquitous beautiful harmonies, clever, sometimes sweet and sometimes biting lyrics and the deceptively powerful musical flourishes that make the band so special, but added to the mix is a dash of increased musical power, undoubtedly from the band but aided by clever production from John Congleton. These thirteen tracks, detailing joys and sorrows, love and loss, indicate that The Staves are as vital as ever." Sean Kerwick of DIY stated: "After such a long time away, 'Good Woman' finds The Staves rejuvenated and inspired, treading new ground while retaining the identity that made them so loveable in the first place. For all the trials bestowed upon the trio in the past few years, they emerge positive and victorious, changing and creating music on their own terms." Sam Boer of Exclaim! said: "While Good Woman is not the most notable stop on the Staves' journey, it retains all of their most delectable elements - heart-hitting harmonies, lovely melodies, and moments of lyrical spark - that have come to define their work."

Rachel Aroesti in a review for The Guardian gave the album four out of five stars and praised the album for its feminist lyrics, writing "Good Woman proves the Staves now slot effortlessly into that roster of intelligent, interesting artists, interrogating life, love and womanhood on their own distinctive terms". In a review for NME, Ella Kemp gave a four out of five stars, while stating: "The Staves have described as the time that preceded 'Good Woman' as a period of hibernation, and the new album sees the Staveley-Taylor sisters emerge completely rejuvenated." Ellen Johnson of Paste praised the band for their "heavenly harmonies and folk instrumentals to craft this enlightened collection of songs, embellishing them with a newfound production flair along the way."

== Commercial performance ==
Good Woman debuted at number 13 on the UK Albums chart, and number 6 on the Scottish Albums chart.

== Track listing ==
Good Woman track listing
No.	Title	Length
1.	"Good Woman"	3:17
2.	"Best Friend"	4:24
3.	"Careful, Kid"	3:59
4.	"Next Year, Next Time"	3:54
5.	"Nothing's Gonna Happen"	3:36
6.	"Sparks"	3:44
7.	"Paralysed"	4:16
8.	"Devotion"	4:10
9.	"Failure"	4:07
10.	"Satisfied"	3:40
11.	"Trying"	2:24
12.	"Waiting on Me to Change"	4:00
Total length:		45:31

== Personnel ==
Credits adapted from AllMusic, and Tidal.

Musicians

- Jessica Staveley-Taylor – vocals (All tracks), guitar (Tracks 1, 2, 3, 4, 6, 7, 8, 9, 10, 11), keyboard (Track 11) piano (Tracks 2, 6, 7, 8, 11, 12)
- Camilla Staveley-Taylor – vocals (All tracks), keyboards (Track 11), synthesizer (Track 11), ukulele (Track 7)
- Emily Staveley-Taylor vocals (All Tracks)
- Marcus Hamblett – horn (Track 5)
- Zach Hanson – bass (Track 10), drums (Track 10)
- Ben Lester – pedal steel guitar (Tracks 4, 10), synthesizer (Track 11)
- Luke Reynolds – bass (Tracks 1, 3, 4, 8, 9, 12), guitar (Tracks 1, 2, 3, 4, 9), keyboard (Track 1, 3, 4), synthesizer (Tracks 2, 6, 8, 9, 12)
- Tom Skinner – drums (Tracks 1, 2, 3, 6, 8, 9)
- Lars Horntveth – woodwind (Tracks 2, 5, 11), lap steel guitar (Tracks 5, 7, 8), synthesizer (Tracks 8, 10)
- Matt Ingram – drums (Tracks 4, 7, 10), percussion (Tracks 4, 7, 10)

Production

- John Congleton – producer, mixer
- Greg Calbi – mastering

== Charts ==
Chart performance for Good Woman
Chart (2021)	Peak position
Irish Albums (IRMA)	100
Scottish Albums (Official Charts)	6
UK Albums (Official Charts)	13
UK Album Downloads (Official Charts)	6
UK Americana Albums (Official Charts)	1
UK Folk Albums (Official Charts)	1
