= Jackinabox =

Studio album by Turin Brakes
- Released: 30 May 2005
- Recorded: 2004
- Genre: Folk rock
- Length: 57:57
- Label: Source
- Producer: Turin Brakes

Turin Brakes chronology
| Ether Song (2003) | Jackinabox (2005) | Napster Sessions (2005) |

Professional ratings
Review scores
| Source | Rating |
|---|---|
| AllMusic | 3.5/5 stars |
| Pitchfork | 6.5/10 |

Jackinabox is the third studio album by the British rock band Turin Brakes. Recorded in their own recording studio in Brixton during 2004, the album includes the singles "Fishing For a Dream" and "Over and Over". It is the follow-up to Ether Song. The album reached no. 9 in the UK charts in the first week, despite the fact that first single, "Fishing for a Dream", did not sell well (charting at no. 35). The album was also released with a bonus DVD and on vinyl. The song "Red Moon" was later recorded in an unplugged version and released as an EP with new material.

The Japanese version had a bonus track, "Where I've Been", which was not released elsewhere.

== Track listing ==
All tracks are written by Olly Knights and Gale Paridjanian.

| No. | Title | Length |
|---|---|---|
| 1. | "They Can't Buy the Sunshine" | 3:08 |
| 2. | "Red Moon" | 4:20 |
| 3. | "Forever" | 3:17 |
| 4. | "Asleep with the Fireflies" | 5:01 |
| 5. | "Fishing for a Dream" | 4:29 |
| 6. | "Road to Nowhere" | 4:00 |
| 7. | "Over and Over" | 3:09 |
| 8. | "Last Clown" | 4:15 |
| 9. | "Above the Clouds" | 3:47 |
| 10. | "Building Wraps Round Me" | 3:45 |
| 11. | "Jackinabox" | 4:21 |
| 12. | "Come and Go" | 14:25 |
| 13. | "Ambient 2" (hidden track) |

== Charts ==
Chart performance for Jackinabox
| Chart (2005) | Peak position |
|---|---|
| UK Albums (OCC) | 9 |
