= Outbursts (album) =

Studio album by Turin Brakes
- Released: 1 March 2010
- Recorded: 2009
- Genre: Folk rock
- Label: Cooking Vinyl
- Producer: Turin Brakes

Turin Brakes chronology
Bottled at Source – The Best of the Source Years (2009)	Outbursts (2010)	The Optimist Live (2012)

Professional ratings
Review scores
Source	Rating
AllMusic	4/5 stars
Antiquiet	4.5/5 stars
NU.nl	8/10 stars

Outbursts is the fifth studio album by English rock band Turin Brakes, the first to appear on their new label, Cooking Vinyl. It was released on 1 March 2010. The first single is "Sea Change".

== Track listing ==
All tracks are written by Olly Knights and Gale Paridjanian.

Outbursts track listing
No.	Title	Length
1.	"Sea Change"	4:02
2.	"Mirror"	2:56
3.	"Rocket Song"	3:23
4.	"Paper Heart"	3:46
5.	"The Invitation"	3:29
6.	"Will Power"	3:59
7.	"Apocolips"	3:39
8.	"Embryos"	3:11
9.	"Never Stops"	4:11
10.	"The Letting Down"	4:03
11.	"Radio Silence"	4:06
12.	"Outbursts"	5:05

== Personnel ==
- Rob Allum – drums
- Eddy Myer – double bass
- Phil Marten – synth strings
- Tim Baxter – string arrangement
- Danny Keane – cello
- Oli Langford – violin/viola
- Barny Barnicott – mixing
- Frank Arkwright – mastering

== Charts ==
Chart performance for Outbursts
Chart (2010)	Peak position
UK Albums (OCC)	64
