= Bad as Me (song) =

Single by Tom Waits

from the album Bad as Me
- Released: August 23, 2011
- Recorded: February – July 2011
- Genre: Experimental rock
- Length: 3:10
- Label: ANTI-
- Songwriter(s): Tom Waits, Kathleen Brennan
- Producer(s): Tom Waits, Kathleen Brennan

Tom Waits singles chronology
"Lie to Me" (2006)	"Bad as Me" (2011)	"Back in the Crowd" (2011)

"Bad as Me" is a song by American rock musician Tom Waits, written collectively by Waits and his wife Kathleen Brennan. Written and recorded during the sessions for his studio album of the same name, the song was released as Waits' seventeenth single on August 23, 2011 and was the first new studio material by Waits in seven years, since Real Gone in 2004.

== Release ==
Following an announcement by Waits on his official web site on August 16, 2011 stating that he "will set the record straight," the artwork, track listing, song length and an audio clip of "Bad as Me" were released on Amazon and musicME. According to Waits, in a YouTube video announcing the release of Bad as Me, the leak of information "spoiled the surprise" of his announcement as the single was "going to go out everywhere, into the blood stream." The previous June, Waits posted a picture of a chalkboard, with the lyrics to the song's chorus, on his official web site and social media pages. The song is also the eighth track on Bad as Me that was released on October 24, 2011.

== Critical reception ==
Upon its release, "Bad as Me" received critical acclaim. Michael Cragg of The Guardian referred to the track as "as raw and unnerving as ever with this clattering, bluesy comeback track" and noted how there "[is] something deeply sinister about the chorus of 'You're the same kind of bad as me', creating an almost suffocating atmosphere." Stereogum also described the song as "a characteristically unhinged caterwaul," and SFWeekly further commented that the song was "pure, melodramatic Waits, with a dragging blues beat, stabbing, reverb-dipped guitars, and a horn section that plays accomplice to the gritty unfoldings [...] making the whole thing feel like the perfect soundtrack to some dusty bar full of misfits and killers in a Robert Rodriguez film." Over a week after its release, "Bad as Me" was added to Rolling Stone's Editors' Picks and was referred to as "a gloriously ramshackle thing, with pop's greatest living vaudevillian pushing his drunkard's bleat over a honking baritone sax and a clattering oompah beat" and called the lyrics "total nonsense, and pure genius."

== Chart performance ==
Chart (2011)	Peak position
UK Indie (OCC)	36

== Track listing ==
Digital download

1. "Bad as Me" - 3:10

== Cover versions ==
Tom Jones performs the song on Spirit in the Room, an album of cover versions.
