= Bad as Me =

Studio album by Tom Waits
- Released: October 21, 2011
- Recorded: February–July, 2011
- Genre: Experimental rock; blues
- Length: 44:44
- Label: Anti-
- Producer: Tom Waits, Kathleen Brennan

Tom Waits chronology
Glitter and Doom Live (2008)	Bad as Me (2011)

Singles from Bad as Me
- 1. "Bad as Me" Released: August 23, 2011; 2. "Back in the Crowd" Released: September 27, 2011

Bad as Me is the seventeenth studio album by American singer-songwriter Tom Waits, released on October 21, 2011, by Anti- Records. The album is known to have been recorded as early as February 2011 and was officially announced for release on August 23, 2011, on Waits' official web site and various social media networks. On the same day, the title track, "Bad as Me", was released as the album's first single on iTunes.

The album is Waits' first album consisting completely of new material in seven years since Real Gone (2004). Waits' label, Anti-, had recently agreed on a distribution deal with Warner Music Group allowing them to release the album internationally. This marks Waits' first release through the Warner organization since Heartattack and Vine (1980). Upon its release, Bad as Me received widespread critical acclaim. The album was nominated for a Grammy Award for Best Alternative Music Album.

Upon release, Bad as Me became Waits' first top 10 album in the US, peaking at number 6.

== Release ==
On August 16, 2011, amid the rise of many rumours concerning Bad as Me, Waits announced on his official web site and through various social media outlets that he would "set the rumors straight" on August 23. On this date, the title track was released as a digital single through iTunes, a video with previews of the album was released on YouTube, and was followed by a press release on his site and Anti-'s blog, which read:

Bad As Me is Tom Waits' first studio album of all new music in seven years. This pivotal work refines the music that has come before and signals a new direction. Waits, in possibly the finest voice of his career, worked with a veteran team of gifted musicians and longtime co-writer/producer Kathleen Brennan. From the opening horn-fueled chug of "Chicago," to the closing barroom chorale of "New Year's Eve," Bad As Me displays the full career range of Waits' songwriting, from beautiful ballads like "Last Leaf," to the avant cinematic soundscape of "Hell Broke Luce," a battlefront dispatch. On tracks like "Talking at the Same Time," Waits shows off a supple falsetto, while on blues burners like "Raised Right Men" and the gospel tinged "Satisfied" he spits, stutters and howls. Like a good boxer, these songs are lean and mean, with strong hooks and tight running times. A pervasive sense of players delighting in each other's musical company brings a feeling of loose joy even to the album's saddest songs.

The album was made available to stream on October 17, 2011 and released digitally on iTunes on October 21, where it was previously available for pre-order. Domestic versions of the album were released worldwide on October 24, 2011 in three formats: a digipak CD version with a 32-page booklet and free digital download in FLAC, AAC, or MP3; a deluxe edition two-CD version with 40-page booklet and free digital download; and a 180 gram LP and CD with a lyric sheet and free digital download. In an interview regarding Bad as Me, Waits confirmed the influence of Captain Beefheart, who had died earlier the same year.

== Reception ==
Professional ratings
Aggregate scores
Source	Rating
AnyDecentMusic?	8.5/10
Metacritic	88/100
Review scores
Source	Rating
AllMusic	4/5 stars
The Daily Telegraph	5/5 stars
Entertainment Weekly	A−
The Guardian	4/5 stars
The Independent	5/5 stars
MSN Music (Expert Witness)	A−
NME	6/10
Pitchfork	8.1/10
Rolling Stone	4/5 stars
Spin	8/10

Bad as Me was released to widespread critical acclaim. At Metacritic, which assigns a normalised rating out of 100 to reviews from mainstream critics, the album received an average score of 88, based on 40 reviews, indicating "universal acclaim". AllMusic's Thom Jurek said that "Bad as Me is an aural portrait of all the places he's traveled as a recording artist, which is, in and of itself, illuminating and thoroughly enjoyable," awarding the album four out of five stars. Amanda Petrusich of Pitchfork noted that the album's "tracks are concise and expertly edited", adding that "Bad as Me feels as new as it does ancient." In a five-star review, Helen Brown of The Daily Telegraph praised the album's "rattling bawlers", adding that each were "distinctively turbocharged with reckless and richly textured energy," while also mentioning that the "ballads run poignantly on their rims, leaking emotion." Michael Wheeler, in his 9/10 review for Drowned in Sound, praised its "exhilarating, terrifying, heartbreaking, tear jerking, bone-rattling style," Andy Gill in The Independent praised the album for containing "no filler at all" and gave it top marks, while Noel Murray of The A.V. Club called it "Waits' embrace of a legacy that now includes enshrinement in the Rock And Roll Hall Of Fame," concluding that "for longtime fans it's a fun reminder of Waits' ability to be a badass when necessary".

In The Guardian, Dave Simpson called Waits's lyrics "as unpredictable and inspired as ever", while claiming his "songs hurtle past in waves of blistering energy and imagery." Rolling Stone's Will Hermes spoke highly of the album in a four out of five star review, saying that it was Waits's "most sharply focused record since the game-changing tag team Swordfishtrombones and Rain Dogs decades ago." In a review for Slant Magazine, Jesse Cataldo stated that Bad as Me was "a self-affirming collection of the things Waits attempts to represent," and, in an equally positive appraisal, Dan Weiss of Spin said that the album "burns at fuse speed." Likewise, Andrew Mueller of Uncut concluded a glowing review by calling the album "the sound of a supremely confident artist convening a raucous celebration of his own myth, and is multifariously marvellous."

Mojo placed the album at number 9 on its list of "Top 50 albums of 2011" while Uncut placed the album at number 13.

== Track listing ==
All tracks are written by Tom Waits and Kathleen Brennan.

No.	Title	Length
1.	"Chicago"	2:15
2.	"Raised Right Men"	3:24
3.	"Talking at the Same Time"	4:14
4.	"Get Lost"	2:42
5.	"Face to the Highway"	3:43
6.	"Pay Me"	3:14
7.	"Back in the Crowd"	2:49
8.	"Bad as Me"	3:10
9.	"Kiss Me"	3:41
10.	"Satisfied"	4:05
11.	"Last Leaf"	2:56
12.	"Hell Broke Luce"	3:57
13.	"New Year's Eve"	4:32
Total length:		44:44

Deluxe edition and pre-order bonus tracks
No.	Title	Length
14.	"She Stole the Blush"	2:50
15.	"Tell Me"	3:43
16.	"After You Die"	2:47

== Personnel ==
Musicians

- Tom Waits – vocals (tracks 1–13), guitar (1–4, 6, 7, 9–11, 13), piano (1, 6, 8, 9), percussion (1, 4, 5, 12), banjo (1), tablas (2), pump organ (11)
- Marc Ribot – guitar (1–8, 10–12)
- Clint Maedgen – saxophone (1, 3, 4, 8, 10, 12, 13)
- Casey Waits – drums (1, 2, 4, 5, 7, 8, 10, 12)
- David Hidalgo – guitar (3, 4, 6, 7, 12), violin (6), percussion (7), accordion, bass guitar, background vocals (13)
- Ben Jaffe – trombone (1, 3, 4), bass clarinet (1), tuba (12, 13)
- Charlie Musselwhite – harmonica (1, 2, 8, 10, 12)
- Patrick Warren – keyboards (3–5, 10, 13)
- James Whiton – bass (3, 5–7, 11)
- Keith Richards – guitar (1, 10–12), vocals (11)
- Augie Meyers – vox organ (2), piano (3), accordion (6)
- Gino Robair – percussion (3, 5, 10), vibraphone (6)
- Larry Taylor – guitar (1, 2), bass (1, 4)
- Chris Grady – trumpet (3, 12, 13)
- Flea – bass (2, 12)
- Will Bernard – guitar (6, 12)
- Dawn Harms – violin (5)
- Marcus Shelby – bass (9)
- Les Claypool – bass (10)
- Zack Sumner – bass (13)

Technical personnel

- Tom Waits – producer
- Kathleen Brennan – producer
- Julianne Deery – assistant producer
- Karl Derfler – engineer, mixing
- Zack Sumner – assistant engineer
- Bernie Grundman – mastering
- Trevor Hernandez – art direction
  - Jesse Dylan – photography
  - Tom Waits – additional photography

== Charts ==
=== Weekly charts ===
Chart (2011)	Peak position
Australian Albums (ARIA)	11
Austrian Albums (Ö3 Austria)	5
Belgian Albums (Ultratop Flanders)	4
Belgian Albums (Ultratop Wallonia)	24
Canadian Albums (Billboard)	6
Danish Albums (Hitlisten)	3
Dutch Albums (Album Top 100)	3
Finnish Albums (Suomen virallinen lista)	12
French Albums (SNEP)	28
German Albums (Offizielle Top 100)	7
Irish Albums (IRMA)	5
Italian Albums (FIMI)	7
New Zealand Albums (RMNZ)	14
Norwegian Albums (VG-lista)	1
Polish Albums (ZPAV)	11
Portuguese Albums (AFP)	6
Scottish Albums (OCC)	8
Spanish Albums (PROMUSICAE)	9
Swedish Albums (Sverigetopplistan)	4
Swiss Albums (Schweizer Hitparade)	3
UK Albums (OCC)	10
US Billboard 200	6
US Digital Albums (Billboard)	5
US Independent Albums (Billboard)	1
US Top Rock Albums (Billboard)	2
US Indie Store Album Sales (Billboard)	1

=== Year-end charts ===
Chart (2011)	Position
Belgian Albums (Ultratop Flanders)	99
Danish Albums (Hitlisten)	67
Dutch Albums (Album Top 100)	58
Swedish Albums (Sverigetopplistan)	63
Swiss Albums (Schweizer Hitparade)	84
US Top Rock Albums (Billboard)	64

=== Singles ===
Year	Single	Peak positions		
Year	Single	BEL (FL)	FRA	UK Ind.
2011	"Bad as Me"	—	50	36
2011	"Back in the Crowd"	73	—	—

Bad as Me earned Waits his best sales week since Nielsen SoundScan launched in 1991, entering at number six on the Billboard 200 and number two on the Top Rock Albums chart; by 2013 it had sold 190,000 copies. As of January 2012, UK sales stand at 40,305 copies according to The Guardian. In 2012, it was awarded a diamond certification from the Independent Music Companies Association, this indicated sales of at least 200,000 copies throughout Europe.

== Release history ==
Region	Date	Format	Label
Germany	October 21, 2011	Digital download	Anti-
Ireland	October 21, 2011	Digital download	Anti-
France	October 24, 2011	Digital download	Anti-
Spain	October 24, 2011	Digital download	Anti-
United Kingdom	October 24, 2011	Digital download	Anti-
Canada	October 25, 2011	Digital download	Anti-
United States	October 25, 2011	Digital download	Anti-
