= Praise & Blame =

Studio album by Tom Jones
- Released: 26 July 2010
- Recorded: December 2009
- Studios: Real World, Box, England; Sunset Sound, Hollywood, California
- Genres: Americana; gospel; blues; soul
- Length: 38.08
- Labels: Island; Lost Highway
- Producer: Ethan Johns

Tom Jones chronology
| 24 Hours (2008) | Praise & Blame (2010) | Spirit in the Room (2012) |

Praise & Blame is the 38th studio album by Welsh musician Tom Jones, released on 26 July 2010. The album was Jones' first release with Island Records and was recorded in 2009 at the Real World Studios in Wiltshire, England. Produced by Ethan Johns, Praise & Blame is made up of largely little known devotional and gospel covers, marking a departure from the pop-orientated style that had dominated Jones' recent recordings.

== Critical reception ==
Professional ratings
Review scores
| Source | Rating |
|---|---|
| AllMusic | 4/5 stars |
| American Songwriter | 4/5 stars |
| Billboard | favourable |
| The Daily Telegraph | 4/5 stars |
| Entertainment Weekly | B+ |
| The Guardian | 4/5 stars |
| The Independent | 5/5 stars |
| LA Times | 4/4 stars |
| New York Daily News | 4/5 stars |
| The New York Times | favourable |
| The Washington Post | favourable |

Upon its release, Praise & Blame received generally positive reviews from most critics. Giving the album four stars, Andrew Perry in The Daily Telegraph claimed that the album was "by far Jones' best album in two decades" and stated that "with its loose, spontaneous sound, and the all-pervasive sense of artistic rebirth…it’s a revelation." Similarly, Andy Gill in The Independent stated: "Overall, it's an extraordinary achievement: Praise & Blame represents the kind of reconnection with his core creative fire that was hinted on a few tracks of his last album, 24 Hours, but is here left naked and bleeding raw, bereft of showbiz blandishments". Giving the album five stars, Gill labelled the album one of the best in Jones' six decade long career.

The album's stripped-down production and focus upon spiritual songs gained numerous comparisons to Johnny Cash's American series and Elvis Presley's 1968 comeback. Writing in American Songwriter, Rick Moore applauded the song selection and stated that "on this excellent collection of songs examining the human condition, Jones confronts the issues of heaven and hell in a way that Cash did for much of his life, especially toward the end of it… [Tom] Jones and [Ethan] Johns have made a real statement in the same way that Rubin, and of course T Bone Burnett, do almost every time they produce an album." Writing in The New York Times, Stephen Holden states that Jones' vocal delivery "conveys the contrition of a sinner as he delivers a mixture of traditional spirituals and contemporary gospel songs tautly arranged for a small band. It is a respectful, expressively focused exploration of a genre beloved by Mr. Jones’s American counterpart, Elvis Presley."

The change of musical direction, together with stripped down, live production – much at odds with Jones' traditional style – led Michael Hann in The Guardian to state "at last Jones the artist is the match of Jones the entertainer." Allison Stewart, writing in The Washington Post, stated that Praise & Blame is "Jones's "O Brother," "Raising Sand" and "Ain't No Grave" all rolled into one, a mixed bag of roots-related styles – blues, gospel-lite, country-folk, rockabilly, soul – stripped of all fat and reduced to the barest elements of voice and spartan, if often electrified, instrumentation. The song choices are impeccable, from a thunderous cover of Bob Dylan's "Oh Mercy" standout "What Good Am I?" to a holy roller redo of John Lee Hooker's "Burning Hell," all propelled by Jones's remarkable voice, still a marvel of quaveriness and bluster and sinew after all these years." "Tom has made, in my opinion, a really great record. [...] It's the church of Tom Jones [...]" – remembering that Tom Jones already thought it was "positive" to have a real church in your honor (in 2006); in 2007, the ministry (founded by actor and pastor Jack J. Stahl) nicknamed "Church of Tom Jones", was being a considered a success story among 35 remarkable companies according to an award-winning book.

== Track listing ==
| No. | Title | Writer(s) | Length |
|---|---|---|---|
| 1. | "What Good Am I?" | Bob Dylan | 3:51 |
| 2. | "Lord Help" | Jessie Mae Hemphill | 3:41 |
| 3. | "Did Trouble Me" | Susan Werner | 4:15 |
| 4. | "Strange Things" | Sister Rosetta Tharpe | 3:00 |
| 5. | "Burning Hell" | Bernard Besman; John Lee Hooker | 3:26 |
| 6. | "If I Give My Soul" | Billy Joe Shaver | 3:30 |
| 7. | "Don't Knock" | Pops Staples; Wesley Westbrooks | 2:16 |
| 8. | "Nobody's Fault but Mine" | trad. | 3:40 |
| 9. | "Didn't It Rain" | trad. | 3:21 |
| 10. | "Ain't No Grave" | Claude Ely | 3:08 |
| 11. | "Run On" | trad. | 3:58 |
| Total length: | | | 38:08 |

iTunes bonus track (available on the CD version in the UK)
| No. | Title | Writer(s) | Length |
|---|---|---|---|
| 12. | "Burning Hell" (Ethan Johns' Wood Room version) | Bessman; Hooker |

Note

- Traditional songs recorded are listed in the album notes as "Written By Tom Jones and Ethan Johns, Published by EMI Music Publishing."

== Personnel ==
Adapted from the album's liner notes.

Musicians

- Tom Jones – vocals
- Ethan Johns – guitar (all tracks), banjo (track 3), mellotron (track 3), bass guitar (track 11), percussion (track 5) tuned percussion (track 10), omnichord (track 10), backing vocals (track 10)
- Booker T. Jones – Hammond B3 (track 2), piano (track 4)
- Dave Bronze – bass guitar (tracks 1, 2, 4, 6–10)
- Richard Causon – harmonium (track 3)
- B. J. Cole – steel guitar (tracks 1, 10)
- Christopher Holland – organ (track 1)
- Ian Jennings – bass guitar (track 3)
- Andy Kitchen – assistant engineer
- Augie Meyers – Farfisa organ (track 1)
- Benmont Tench – piano (track 9)
- Henry Spinetti – drums (track 3)
- Jeremy Stacey – drums (tracks 1, 2, 4–11)
- Allison Pierce – backing vocals (track 10)
- Louis Price – backing vocals (track 9)
- David Rawlings – backing vocals (track 4)
- Camilla Staveley-Taylor – backing vocals (track 7)
- Emily Staveley-Taylor – backing vocals (track 7)
- Jessica Staveley-Taylor – backing vocals (track 7)
- Oren Waters – backing vocals (track 9)
- Gillian Welch – backing vocals (tracks 3, 4)
- Terry Young – backing vocals (track 9)

Technical

- Ethan Johns – producer (all tracks), mixing (all tracks)
- Dominic Monks – recording engineer
- Mat Arnold – assistant engineer (all tracks)
- Bill Mims – assistant engineer (tracks 1–4, 9, 10)
- Bob Ludwig – mastering
- Recorded at Real World (Box, England); additional recording at Sunset Sound (Hollywood, California) & Three Crows (Wiltshire, England)
- All tracks mixed at Three Crows
- Studio Fury – image making, design & art direction
- Marcus Grob – portrait
- Photographs of Welsh and American landscapes taken from the archives of the Library of Congress

== Chart positions ==
=== Weekly charts ===
| Chart (2010) | Peak position |
|---|---|
| Australian Albums (ARIA) | 32 |
| Austrian Albums (Ö3 Austria) | 9 |
| Belgian Albums (Ultratop Flanders) | 23 |
| Belgian Albums (Ultratop Wallonia) | 64 |
| Danish Albums (Hitlisten) | 34 |
| Dutch Albums (Album Top 100) | 16 |
| European Top 100 Albums | 4 |
| Finnish Albums (Suomen virallinen lista) | 49 |
| German Albums (Offizielle Top 100) | 37 |
| Irish Albums (IRMA) | 14 |
| New Zealand Albums (RMNZ) | 13 |
| Norwegian Albums (VG-lista) | 22 |
| Scottish Albums (Official Charts) | 3 |
| Spanish Albums (Promusicae) | 67 |
| Swedish Albums (Sverigetopplistan) | 7 |
| Swiss Albums (Schweizer Hitparade) | 51 |
| UK Albums (Official Charts) | 2 |
| US Billboard 200 | 79 |

=== Year-end charts ===
| Chart (2010) | Position |
|---|---|
| Swedish Albums (Sverigetopplistan) | 65 |
| UK Albums (OCC) | 103 |

== Certifications ==
| Region | Certification | Certified units/sales |
|---|---|---|
| United Kingdom (BPI) | Gold | 100,000^{^} |
^{^} Shipments figures based on certification alone.

== Release history ==
| Country | Date | Label | Format | Catalogue # |
|---|---|---|---|---|
| United Kingdom | 26 July 2010 | Island Records | CD, download | |
| United States | 27 July 2010 | Lost Highway Records | CD, download | 001455502 |
