= If Not Now Then When? =

- Standard edition cover

Studio album by Ethan Johns
- Released: November 2012; July 30, 2013
- Recorded: January – June 2012
- Genre: Acoustic rock, folk, indie rock
- Label: Three Crows Music
- Producer: Dominic Monks, Jeremy Stacey, Richard Causon, Ryan Adams, Laura Marling

Ethan Johns chronology
If Not Now Then When? (2012)	The Reckoning (2014)

Professional ratings
Aggregate scores
Source	Rating
Metacritic	76/100
Review scores
Source	Rating
NME	8/10

If Not Now Then When? is the debut solo studio album by English artist and record producer Ethan Johns. Inspired by the 22 minute opus of the same name by early 1990s Dublin band Spacepony UK (members of which later formed Future Kings Of Spain), it was released in November 2012 on vinyl and was scheduled to be released in other formats in February 2013, by his own Three Crows Music label. The album was recorded in early 2012 and was engineered by Dominic Monks. If Not Now Then When? was mixed by Johns' father, audio engineer and record producer Glyn Johns, at Sunset Sound in Los Angeles. The album features performances with Ryan Adams, Laura Marling and Danny Thompson. Bill Wyman played bass guitar on "Red Rooster Blue." Johns will follow the vinyl release of the album with a full UK tour of independent record stores in November 2012.

== Track listing ==
All tracks composed by Ethan Johns

Standard edition
No.	Title	Featuring	Length
1.	"Hello Sunshine"		3:08
2.	"Morning Blues"		3:44
3.	"Eden"		3:51
4.	"Red Rooster Blue"		3:32
5.	"The Turning"		4:11
6.	"Rally"		3:25
7.	"Don't Reach Too Far"		2:40
8.	"Whip Poor Will"	Ryan Adams, Laura Marling, Danny Thompson	5:03
9.	"Willow"		3:28
10.	"The Long Way Round"		3:27

== Personnel ==
- Ethan Johns - vocals, acoustic and electric guitar, Mellotron, Wurlitzer electric piano, Chamberlin, percussion, harmonica, sound effects, programming
- Jeremy Stacey - drums
- Bill Wyman - bass on "Red Rooster Blue"
- Ian McLagan - organ on "Red Rooster Blue"
- Richard Causon - piano and SK1 organ on "The Turning", keyboards on "The Long Way Round"
- Danny Thompson - bass on "Rally", "Whip Poor Will" and "The Long Way Round"
- Dave Swarbrick - fiddle on "Rally"
- Ryan Adams - bass and drums on "Don't Reach Too Far", backing vocals on "Whip Poor Will"
- Chris Holland - organ on "Don't Reach Too Far"
- Melvin Duffy - pedal steel guitar on "Whip Poor Will"
- Laura Marling - backing vocals on "Whip Poor Will"
