= Ether Song =

Studio album by Turin Brakes
- Released: 3 March 2003
- Genre: Folk rock
- Length: 58:31
- Label: Source
- Producer: Tony Hoffer

Turin Brakes chronology
| The Optimist LP (2001) | Ether Song (2003) | Jackinabox (2005) |

Professional ratings
Review scores
| Source | Rating |
|---|---|
| AllMusic | 4.5/5 stars |
| The Guardian | 4/5 stars |
| Rolling Stone | 3/5 stars |
| Tiny Mix Tapes | 4/5 stars |

Ether Song is the second studio album by the British rock band Turin Brakes. Following the band's first album The Optimist LP (2001), this was a bit of a departure, relying on more electric instruments. Despite the change in sound, the album was received well by critics and reached number four on the UK Albums Chart.

== Track listing ==
All tracks are written by Olly Knights and Gale Paridjanian.

| No. | Title | Length |
|---|---|---|
| 1. | "Blue Hour" | 3:42 |
| 2. | "Average Man" | 2:43 |
| 3. | "Long Distance" | 4:27 |
| 4. | "Self Help" | 4:23 |
| 5. | "Falling Down" | 3:30 |
| 6. | "Stone Thrown" | 4:04 |
| 7. | "Clear Blue Air" | 3:52 |
| 8. | "Pain Killer (Summer Rain)" | 3:56 |
| 9. | "Full of Stars" | 4:40 |
| 10. | "Panic Attack" | 2:29 |
| 11. | "Little Brother" | 5:33 |
| 12. | "Rain City" | 15:15 |
| 13. | "Ether Song" (hidden track) |

In some regions and versions, the album was sold with bonus discs. The album was later released with a bonus CD featuring the single "5 Mile (These Are the Days)" with its track list being:

1. 5 Mile (These Are the Days)
2. The Boss
3. Heard a Rumour
4. Long Distance (VARA Radio/3FM Holland)
5. Falling Down (SBN session)
6. Pain Killer (Summer Rain) (RTL2 Acoustic Version)

However, initial pressings with bonus discs came with the following track list:

1. "Blue Hour" (home recording)
2. "Self Help" (SBN session)
3. "Long Distance" (SBN session)
4. "Bright Golden Lights" (home recording)

== Charts ==
Chart performance for Ether Song
| Chart (2003) | Peak position |
|---|---|
| Australian Albums (ARIA) | 99 |
| UK Albums (OCC) | 4 |
