= The Optimist LP =

Studio album by Turin Brakes
- Released: 5 March 2001
- Studio: Konk, London
- Genre: Folk rock
- Length: 51:36
- Label: Source
- Producer: Turin Brakes

Turin Brakes chronology
Fight or Flight (2000)	The Optimist LP (2001)	Ether Song (2003)

The Optimist LP is the debut studio album by English rock band Turin Brakes, released in 2001. "The Door" and "The Road" (previously released on The Door EP) were re-recorded for this album.

The album was nominated for the Mercury Music Prize.

In late 2011, Turin Brakes embarked on a national tour performing the whole of the album in its entirety for its tenth anniversary and again in 2021 for its twentieth anniversary.

== Critical reception ==
Professional ratings
Aggregate scores
Source	Rating
Metacritic	76/100
Review scores
Source	Rating
AllMusic	3/5 stars
Drowned in Sound	8/10
Entertainment Weekly	B−
The Guardian	2/5 stars
NME	9/10
Pitchfork	7.7/10
Q	4/5 stars

Q listed The Optimist LP as one of the best 50 albums of 2001.

== Track listing ==
All tracks are written by Gale Paridjanian & Olly Knights

1. "Feeling Oblivion" – 3:52
2. "Underdog (Save Me)" – 3:35
3. "Emergency 72" – 4:05
4. "Future Boy" – 4:00
5. "The Door" – 3:52
6. "State of Things" – 3:33
7. "By TV Light" – 4:53
8. "Slack" – 3:16
9. "Starship" – 2:50
10. "The Road" – 5:33
11. "Mind Over Money" – 4:53
12. "The Optimist" – 7:43
- The song "The Optimist" ends at 3:25. After 2 minutes of silence, at 5:25 the hidden song "Three Days Old" begins.

== Charts ==
=== Weekly charts ===
Weekly chart performance for The Optimist LP
Chart (2001)	Peak position
Scottish Albums (OCC)	12
UK Albums (OCC)	27

=== Year-end charts ===
Year-end chart performance for The Optimist LP
Chart (2001)	Position
UK Albums (OCC)	130
