= Noah and the Whale discography =

- Studio albums: 4
- Extended plays: 2
- Singles: 10

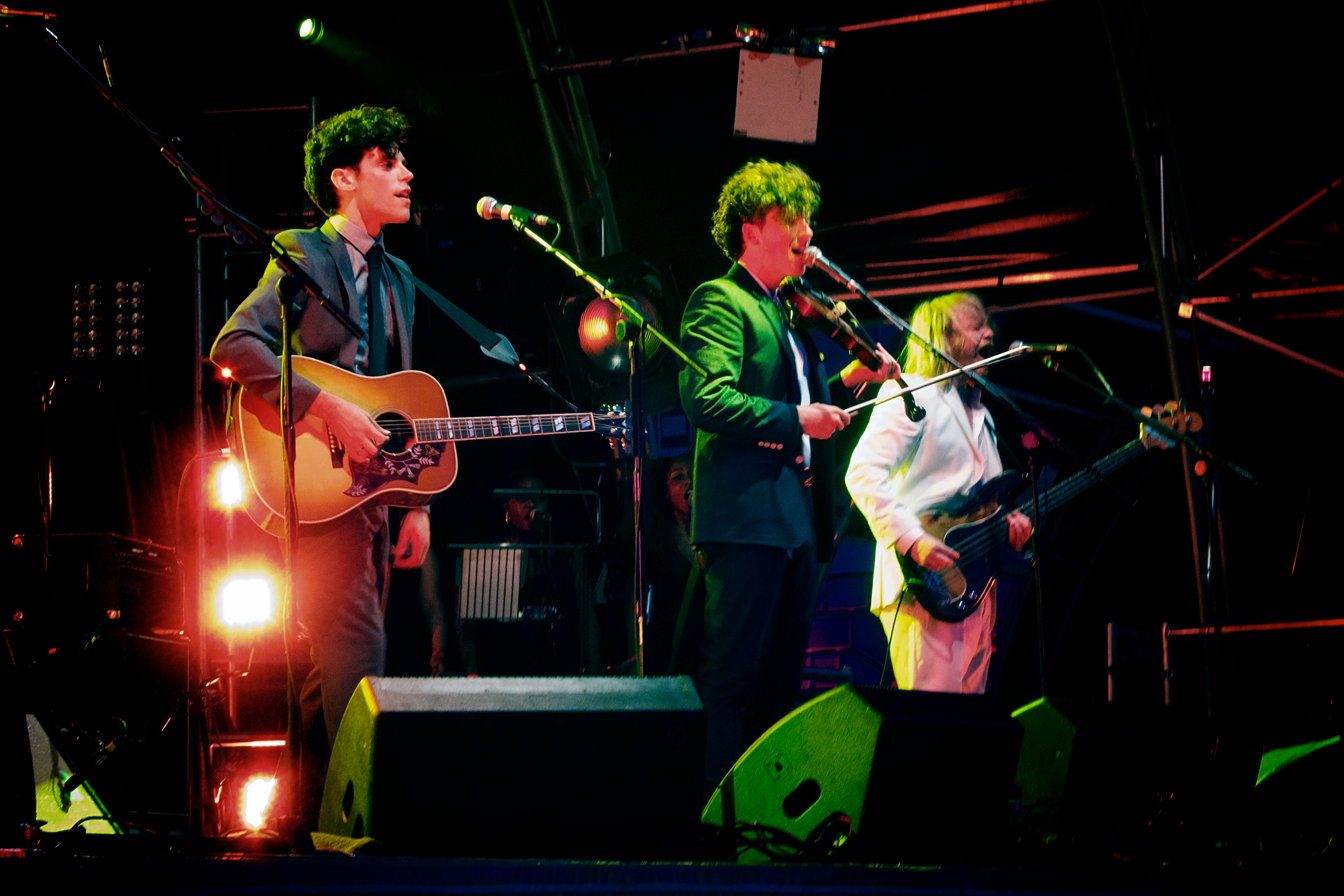
Noah and the Whale

English indie folk band Noah and the Whale released four studio albums, two extended play and ten singles.

After the release of a few singles, the band's debut album, entitled Peaceful, the World Lays Me Down, was released on 11 August 2008. The release made it to Number 5 on the official UK Albums Chart. Doug Fink, brother of singer, Charlie, originally played drums but left to pursue a career as a doctor. Until mid-2008, Laura Marling was a member of the band and performed with them as much as her solo touring schedule allowed. She also performed the background vocals on the band's debut album but left the band several months after its release.

From January 2009 onwards, the band started work on their second full-length LP, entitled The First Days of Spring. Along with the album release, Charlie Fink wrote and directed a film that runs the entire length of the album, also entitled The First Days of Spring. Fink decided not to feature female backing vocals on their second LP due to the painful but inspiring departure of Laura Marling to pursue a solo career. Her separation from the band did however inspire a change from their traditional sound, signaling a new direction in the band's music and lyrics. The album was released on 31 August 2009, a little over a year after their debut. Three days prior to the release Doug Fink, brother of lead singer Charlie, announced he would be leaving the band to pursue a career in medicine. At the same time Fred Abbott was brought in on second guitar/piano and Doug was temporarily replaced by former Pull Tiger Tail drummer Jack Hamson.

In January 2010, it was announced that Noah and the Whale were heading to the recording studio soon to prepare their third album, for which the band was considering the title Old Joy, however, in an interview with the website SoonerMusic.com, lead singer Charlie announced that the album would be called Last Night On Earth. On 3 December 2010 the band released a track from the upcoming album on their official website, titled "Wild Thing". The first official single from the album, "L.I.F.E.G.O.E.S.O.N.", was released on 23 January 2011, peaking at number 14 in the UK Singles Chart. Last Night on Earth was released on 7 March 2011 through Mercury Records. In 2011 the song "Waiting for My Chance to Come" was used in the series finale for the UK teen drama Skins.

The band released their fourth studio album Heart of Nowhere on 6 May 2013.

== Studio albums ==
List of studio albums, with selected details, peak chart positions and certifications shown
Title	Album details	Peak chart positions							Certifications
Title	Album details	UK	AUS	BEL (FL)	IRE	NL	SCO	US	Certifications
Peaceful, the World Lays Me Down	Released: 11 August 2008; Label: Vertigo; Formats: CD, vinyl, digital download	5	—	—	32	—	9	—	BPI: Gold
The First Days of Spring	Released: 21 August 2009; Label: Vertigo; Formats: CD, vinyl, digital download	16	—	—	19	— (Note: The First Days of Spring did not enter the Dutch Album Top 100, but entered the Dutch Alternative Top 30 chart at number 19.)	22	—	BPI: Gold
Last Night on Earth	Released: 7 March 2011; Label: Vertigo; Formats: CD, vinyl, digital download	8	86	57	11	89	11	135	BPI: Platinum; IRMA: Gold
Heart of Nowhere	Released: 3 May 2013; Label: Vertigo, Mercury; Formats: CD, vinyl, digital download	13	62	95	18	— (Note: Heart of Nowhere did not enter the Dutch Album Top 100, but entered the Dutch Alternative Top 30 chart at number 22.)	16	—	
"—" denotes a release that did not chart.

== Extended plays ==
List of EPs, with selected details
Title	EP details
Noah and the Whale Presents: The A Sides	Released: 25 December 2008; Label: Young and Lost Club; Formats: 12" vinyl
iTunes Festival: London 2011	Released: 25 July 2011; Label: Mercury; Formats: Digital download

== Singles ==
List of singles, with selected peak chart positions and certifications shown
Title	Year	Peak chart positions										Certifications	Album
Title	Year	UK	AUS Hit.	AUT	BEL (FL)	CZ Rock	IRE	MEX	POL	SCO	SWI	Certifications	Album
"5 Years Time" (Note: "5 Years Time" did not enter the Ultratop 50, but peaked at number 22 on the Flemish Ultratip chart.)	2007	7	—	59	72	—	10	—	40	3	74	BPI: Platinum	Peaceful, the World; Lays Me Down
"2 Bodies 1 Heart"	2008	—	—	—	—	—	—	—	—	—	—		Peaceful, the World; Lays Me Down
"Shape of My Heart"	2008	94	—	—	—	—	—	—	—	30	—		Peaceful, the World; Lays Me Down
"Blue Skies"	2009	95	—	—	—	—	—	—	—	—	—		The First Days of Spring
"L.I.F.E.G.O.E.S.O.N." (Note: "L.I.F.E.G.O.E.S.O.N." did not enter the Ultratop 50, but peaked at number 4 on the Flemish Ultratip chart.)	2011	14	10	—	54	14	26	—	43	14	77	BPI: Platinum	Last Night on Earth
"Tonight's the Kind of Night" (Note: "Tonight's the Kind of Night" did not enter the Ultratop 50, but peaked at number 14 on the Flemish Ultratip chart.)	2011	67	—	—	64	—	—	—	—	50	—		Last Night on Earth
"Life Is Life"	2011	128	—	—	—	—	—	—	—	—	—		Last Night on Earth
"Waiting For My Chance to Come"	2011	185	—	—	—	—	—	—	—	—	—		Last Night on Earth
"There Will Come a Time"	2013	168	19	—	—	—	—	46	—	—	—		Heart of Nowhere
"Lifetime"	2013	—	—	—	104	—	—	50	—	—	—		Heart of Nowhere
"—" denotes a single that did not chart or was not released in that territory.
