= The Mall School =

Location
- 185 Hampton Road; Twickenham, Middlesex, TW2 5NQ; England; 51.43728°N 0.34911°W

Information
- Type: Preparatory school Private school Day school
- Established: 1872; 154 years ago
- Local authority: Richmond upon Thames
- Ofsted: Reports
- Headmaster: Mr. Sam Gosden
- Gender: Co-educational
- Age: 6 months to 11
- Enrolment: Non-selective for entry into Nursery and Reception; assessment at all other entry points including 7+ and 8+.
- Houses: Pembroke, Corpus, Magdalen, Trinity
- Colours: Blue, yellow, turquoise, maroon
- Website: www.themallschool.org.uk

The Mall School is an independent preparatory school and nursery for boys and girls, in Twickenham, London. The nursery can take up to 75 children aged 6 months to 4 years and the school welcomes pupils from Reception at the age of 4, before leaving for senior schools at the age of 11.

== Facilities ==
The nursery is accommodated in a self-contained building (formerly the pre-prep) with 5 large bright rooms appropriately equipped for each age group from babies to pre-schoolers, with a large outdoor area and separate outdoor area for babies.

The facilities at the main site include a 160-seat theatre, a science block and garden, art and music studios, an ICT suite, and library. Interactive classroom whiteboards are provided throughout most of the school. An indoor swimming pool and sports hall are on site; use is also made of rugby and football pitches at St.James' Primary School, and cricket pitches and athletics facilities at Sunbury Cricket Club

== School structure ==
In 2017 the school announced it was to phase out the sitting of the Common Entrance examination at age 13 (Year 8) and the two academic years leading up to them. All boys would select their future schools in Year 6 and, if required, sit 11+ entrance exams for them, and then leave at the age of 11. This change was made in order to follow the trend of senior schools preferring to admit the majority of their pupils at that age. The first 11+ cohort left in the summer of 2019, and the last 13+ cohort in the summer of 2020.

In September 2022 the school's nursery opened for children aged 6 months to 4 years and operates for 11 hours a day across 51 weeks of the year.

In September 2023 the school welcomed girls into the Reception class for the first time and will move towards becoming fully coeducational by 2029.

Some pupils may go on to the leading London day schools, including St. Paul's School, Hampton School and King's College School. Others go to a wide range of single-sex and coeducational day schools including Kingston Grammar School, as well as state grammar schools including Tiffin.

== Link with Chitsime School (Malawi) ==
The Mall School has had a partnership with Chitsime School in Malawi since 2009.

It is the focus of many fundraising activities, and the pupils are motivated to help the school in as many ways as practicable. In particular, in recent years pupils and staff at the Mall have raised thousands of pounds to provide brand new classrooms for Chitsime School.

== Notable alumni ==
- Andy Beattie, former rugby player, Bath Rugby Club and England national rugby union team
- Richard Dimbleby, the BBC's first war correspondent and then its leading TV news commentator
- Zac Goldsmith, former Conservative MP for Richmond Park
- Crispian Mills, musician
- Noah and the Whale, two members of the band (brothers Charlie and Doug Fink) known for their popular music song 5 Years Time
- Alex Pettyfer, actor - known for his lead role in Magic Mike
- Gareth Stedman Jones, historian
