= Charlie Fink =

English musician (born 1986)

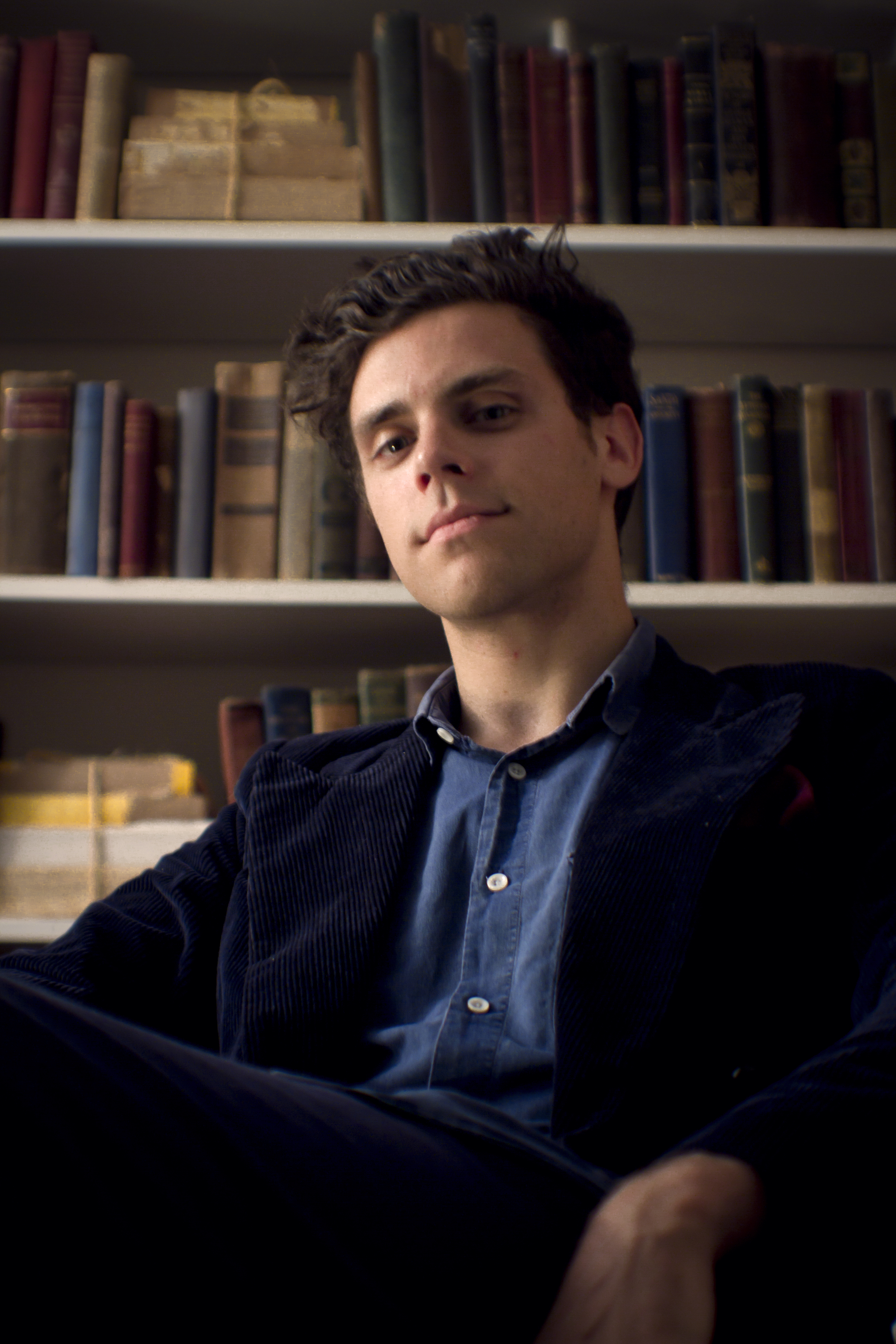
- Fink in 2015

Background information
- Born: Charlie Fink; 16 May 1986 (age 40); Twickenham, London, England
- Genres: Americana; folk rock; indie folk; indie pop
- Years active: 2006–present
- Website: http://www.charliefink.co

Charlie Fink (born 16 May 1986) is an English songwriter, producer and filmmaker best known for fronting Noah and the Whale and for his work as a composer for theatre. He has been described as "one of Britain’s most daring and inventive songwriters" by the Sunday Times and "a theatre composer of the first rank" by the Evening Standard.

== Early life ==
Fink was born in Twickenham, West London. His paternal grandfather was a German Jew who escaped the Nazis in the 1930s and went to South Africa. Fink was privately educated at The Mall School, Twickenham, and St Paul's School, London.

== Music ==
=== Noah and the Whale ===
Fink has the sole writing credit on the first three Noah and the Whale albums which have collectively sold over a million copies worldwide, including two gold records and one platinum record. His song "5 Years Time" was named NME's song of the summer 2008.

He toured with the band from 2006 until their split in 2015. The band have played at a number of notable venues, including a sold-out show at the Royal Albert Hall and festivals such as Coachella, Lollapoloza and Glastonbury as well as headlining Wilderness Festival in 2013. They also toured with Arcade Fire, Vampire Weekend, and Phoenix. Fink has appeared with the band on Late Show with David Letterman as well as Later... with Jools Holland, The Graham Norton Show and The Andrew Marr Show. He has directed a number of his band's music videos and a short film that accompanied their second album The First Days of Spring and another film that accompanied their fourth album Heart of Nowhere.

He featured at number 18 on NME's Cool List as well as GQ's best dressed lists.

==== Work with other artists ====
Fink produced Laura Marling's first album Alas I Cannot Swim, which was nominated for the Mercury Music Prize. He has also produced music for Charlotte Gainsbourg, Jay Jay Pistolet and Rae Morris. Since 2014 he has co-written and produced music with artists such as Foxes, Rhodes and Eliot Sumner.

== Work in theatre ==
=== Cover My Tracks ===
In April 2017 Fink released a new song "Firecracker" as a teaser for debut solo album entitled Cover My Tracks. Fink's album was accompanied by a new show, written with David Greig, also called Cover My Tracks, performed in June 2017, and subsequently toured throughout the country that year.

=== The Lorax ===
Fink wrote the music and lyrics for the Old Vic theatre production of the Dr. Seuss classic The Lorax which was nominated for an Olivier Award in 2016. The show received a five star review from Michael Billington at the Guardian, who called it "the best family show since Matilda." The original production ran from 2 December 2015 to 16 January 2016. The production returned to The Old Vic in 2017 to further five star reviews. " It has since gone on to tour in Toronto, Minneapolis and San Diego.

=== As You Like It ===
Fink wrote the music for a production of As You Like It in Regent's Park Open Air Theatre in July 2018. The show opened to positive reviews with the Times describing it as "Gorgeous".

=== The Man in the White Suit ===
Fink wrote the music for the stage adaptation of the Ealing comedy The Man in the White Suit. The script was written by Sean Foley, and it starred Stephen Mangan, Sue Johnston and Kara Tointon. The show opened at Bath Theatre Royal before running for three months on the West End. It was described by Broadway World as "two hours of pure delight".

== Work in film ==
=== Director ===
Fink directed many of Noah and the Whale's music videos, including "Give It All Back", "Shape of My Heart", "Tonight's the Kind of Night", and "Two Bodies One Heart".

He co-directed the music video for "L.I.F.E.G.O.E.S.O.N" with Sophie Muller.

He also wrote and directed two short films to accompany The First Days of Spring and Heart of Nowhere. These were screened in cinemas as well as at a film and music festivals.

His short film "The Real Thing" was in the official selection at London Film Festival 2024 as well as Norwich Film Festival and Aesthetica Film Festival.

=== Composer ===
Fink wrote the songs for the film A Street Cat Named Bob, performed by British actor and singer Luke Treadaway. The score was written by David Hirschfelder.

Noah and the Whale's songs appeared on the soundtrack for the film The Scouting Book for Boys, written by Jack Thorne and directed by Tom Harper.

== Discography ==
Noah and the Whale

- Peaceful, the World Lays Me Down (2008)
- The First Days of Spring (2009)
- Last Night on Earth (2011)
- Heart of Nowhere (2013)

Solo

- Cover My Tracks (2017)
