= Seeqnce =

Startup accelerator in Beirut, Lebanon

- Industry: Startup accelerator
- Founded: Beirut, Lebanon (2010)
- Headquarters: Beirut, Lebanon
- Key people: Samer Karam
- Website: www.seeqnce.com

Seeqnce is a startup accelerator based in Beirut, Lebanon. The company advises on best practices in building startup ecosystems.

== History ==
The company was founded in 2010 by Samer Karam, who served as Chairman and General Manager. In July 2011, Seeqnce launched its state-of-the-art space in the heart of Beirut (Hamra). On August 24, 2012, Seeqnce announced its investment in 8 startups.

== Approach ==
The lack of expertise, the lack of knowledge on startup accelerators as well as the risk-averse culture are among the factors which called for a need for modifications when applying western methods in the region.

One of the adjustments Seeqnce made to meet region's needs is the duration of the program which is 6 months. This is twice the duration of Y Combinator's program.

== Program ==
The program [SqP] is a year-long web / mobile business creation process that is composed of two phases: Selection and Acceleration.

After operating for year and a half, Wamda elected Seeqnce as one of "the top 10 accelerators" in the MENA region.

== Seeqnce Accelerator Program 2012 ==
Another startup Seeqnce accelerated is Cinemoz described by TechCrunch as "on its way to becoming the Hulu of the Arab world."
