= Waiting for My Chance to Come =

"Waiting for my Chance to Come"

Single by Noah and the Whale

from the album Last Night on Earth
- Released: 12 September 2011
- Genre: Alternative
- Length: 2:57
- Label: Universal Mercury
- Songwriter(s): Charlie Fink
- Producer(s): Charlie Fink, Jason Lader

Noah and the Whale singles chronology
"Life is Life" (2011)	"Waiting for my Chance to Come" (2011)	"There Will Come a Time" (2013)

"Waiting For My Chance to Come" is a song by English folk band Noah and the Whale. The single served as the fourth single from the band's third studio album, Last Night on Earth. The single was released in the United Kingdom on 12 September 2011. It has so far peaked to number 185 on the UK Singles Chart.

== Music video ==
The music video for the song appeared on their YouTube channel on 12 September 2011. It features the band playing on a red lightship in the pool of London on the Thames, visibly across from The O2. Throughout the video the Union Jack is used with Charlie Fink wearing a set of Union Jack socks and showing shots of the band with Fink draped in Union Jack bunting.

== Track listing ==
Promo CD single
No.	Title	Length
1.	"Waiting for my Chance To Come"	2:53

Album version
No.	Title	Length
1.	"Waiting for my Chance To Come"	2:57

== Chart performance ==
Chart (2011)	Peak position
UK Singles (The Official Charts Company)	185

== Credits and personnel ==
- Lead vocals – Noah and the Whale
- Producers – Charlie Fink, Jason Lader
- Lyrics – Charlie Fink
- Label: Mercury Records
