= Samer Karam =

Lebanese entrepreneur, investor, author, and activist

- Occupations: Entrepreneur, investor, author, and activist
- Years active: 2004-
- Website: Samer Karam on LinkedIn

Samer Karam is a Lebanese entrepreneur, investor, author, and activist. He founded Seeqnce, the first startup accelerator in Lebanon, created the Accelerate conference, and has had a leading role in building Lebanon's startup ecosystem and promoting, advising, mentoring, and investing in startup ecosystems across the world. In a 2017 article about Beirut's tech scene, tech journalist Monty Munford said Karam is "probably the most influential tech person across the Middle East North Africa (MENA) region."

== Early career and activism ==
Karam created Blogging Beirut, a citizens' photojournalism website, in 2004. During the 2006 Lebanon War, it became one of the most visited blogs in Lebanon. In 2007, he founded his first tech company, Wunbox, with a concept similar to Google Wave. He also started a couple of businesses based on Twitter. During this period, Karam co-authored scientific papers on community information and location technology.

With his campaign "Flip the Switch", Karam lobbied the Lebanese minister of communications into tackling the nation's stifling connection speeds. During the Egyptian revolution of 2011, he kept a real-time online register of missing persons.

== Startup initiatives ==
In 2010, Karam decided he would assist Lebanese early-stage startups. After a few months of running a collective, he realized that the growing startup scene needed a space. Converting a derelict apartment in Hamra into an office and raising $700,000, Karam founded the startup accelerator Seeqnce. Seeqnce was the first startup accelerator in Lebanon and one of the first in MENA, providing investment, mentoring and offices to each startup. Its first two batches of start-ups raised more than $10 million.

In 2014, Karam turned Seeqnce into Alice, one of the first online accelerators, which was based in London and supported by angel investors. For startups, it offered financial templates, performance metrics, and a global pool of mentors. For investors, it provided a library of startups seeking investment, with financial and business information, investment portfolio management and performance monitoring. Its name was a nod to Alice's Adventures in Wonderland, as Karam likened creating a startup to going down the rabbit hole. At Mobile World Congress' 4YFN conference in Barcelona in 2014, he set up the pavilion featuring 14 leading Arab startups.

He was a venture capital advisor of Banque du Liban (BDL, the Central Bank of Lebanon) and was a member of the founding steering committee of BDL's Circular 331 startup fund, worth $600 million. Karam created the Accelerate conference, which was one of the 10 biggest tech conferences in the world in 2016. Together with Nicolas Sehnaoui, he created Beirut Angels, an initiative to gather Lebanese angel investors. His initiative Startup Megaphone has promoted the Lebanese startup ecosystem by holding events abroad, such as Startup Lebanon, and creating national strategies and guides endorsed by BDL, such as "Lebanon's Startup Ecosystem Roadmap" (2015), which was commissioned to Startup Megaphone and provided an analysis and actionable plan for the ecosystem's development, and the Startup Guide Lebanon.

Mike Butcher (journalist), Editor at Large of TechCrunch, noted that "right now I can think of few other people who introduced Lebanon to the international tech community with as much energy, enthusiasm and longevity".
