= Samuel Wamba Fosso =

Cameroonian researcher, author, academic

- Occupations: Researcher, author, and academic

Academic background
- Education: BSc in Mathematics; MSc in Mathematics; MS in E-commerce; PhD in Industrial Engineering; Habilitation in Information Systems
- Alma mater: University of Yaoundé I Sherbrooke University; HEC Montréal; Montreal University; Télécom Paris
- Thesis: An empirical study of the impact of RFID technology and the EPC Network on supply chain management: The case of the retail industry (2009)

Academic work
- Institutions: Toulouse Business School
- Website: fossowambasamuel.com

Samuel Wamba Fosso is a Cameroonian researcher, author, and academic. He is a professor at TBS Education in France and a Distinguished Visiting professor at The University of Johannesburg, South Africa. He was a visiting professor of Artificial Intelligence at Bradford University from September 2020 to September 2021

Fosso's research focuses on various aspects of artificial intelligence in business, including business analytics, big data, social media, and open data. Additionally, he has explored the business value of information technology, inter-organizational system adoption and its impacts, supply chain management, electronic commerce, and blockchain. He has authored 5 books, including Enterprise and Organizational Modeling and Simulation, and Transformation de la supply chain grâce aux systèmes d'information : Apport de l'Internet des Objets and has written book chapters and journal articles.

Fosso is an academic founder of RFID Academia. He is most known for his contributions to big data analytics and enterprise, which is attributed to the high number of published articles and citations. He ranks among the 1% most cited scholars in the world for the years 2020, 2021, and 2022 based on Clarivate Analytics' Highly Cited Researchers List.

== Education ==
Fosso studied for a bachelor's degree in mathematics at the University of Yaoundé I, which he completed in 1996. Later, in 2000, he received his first master's degree in mathematics from Sherbrooke University in Canada, followed by a second master's degree in E-commerce from Montreal University in Canada. For his Ph.D., he researched Industrial Engineering at Montreal University, specializing in the impact of RFID technology and the EPC Network on supply chain management in the retail industry. His thesis was titled "An empirical study of the Impact of RFID Technology and the EPC Network on supply chain management: The Case of the retail industry". Additionally, he earned his Habilitation to Conduct Research in management science, information systems at the Telecom Business School, University of Évry at Essonne, France in 2015, with a thesis on the "Transformation of the Supply Chain Management through Inter-Organizational Information Systems: The Contribution of the Internet of Things".

== Career ==
In 2006, Fosso held a brief appointment as a part-time professor in the School of Business at Ottawa University before becoming a professor at Academia RFID in Montreal. Afterwards, he served as an assistant professor of information technology at the University of Wollongong in Australia. Between 2012 and 2016, he held the position of Professor of Information Systems and Supply Chain Management at NEOMA Business School. He is a professor at Toulouse business school Education in France, a distinguished visiting professor at the University of Johannesburg in South Africa, and a visiting professor of artificial intelligence at Bradford University. He is also a visiting professor at the Catholic University of Central Africa.

== Research ==
Fosso's research interests encompass a broad spectrum of topics, with a primary focus on Big Data and Business Analytics, Radio frequency identification (RFID), Electronic Commerce, Mobile Business, ERP, Supply Chain Management, Management of Innovation, Digital Transformation, and Artificial Intelligence. Additionally, he has secondary research interests in areas such as e-government, Green Computing, Geographic Information Systems, IT-enabled Disasters Management, and IT-enabled Social Inclusion. His work has been published in recognized journals and has been cited widely throughout his career.

One of Fosso's primary research areas is supply chain management, in which he has explored the potential use of various technologies, such as Radio Frequency Identification (RFID), Artificial Intelligence (AI), and Blockchain, o improve supply chain processes and performance. He highlighted the role of technology in enhancing supply chain operations and ensuring companies' competitiveness. Furthermore, he examined the potential impact of AR in supply chain and logistics management in 2021 and discussed different technologies' involvement and potential impact on managing various business models in his book, Managing the Digital Transformation: Aligning Technologies, Business Models, and Operations. His book also described the fundamental aspects of integrating technology, organizational structures, operations, and supply chain management to facilitate a successful digital transformation.

=== Big data analytics (BDA) ===
Fosso has conducted extensive research in the area of big data analytics and has explored its characteristic, challenges, definitional aspects, and types in different business modules. In a combined study, he identified the importance of system and information quality in big data analytics as the key component to enhance business and also proposed a big data analytics capability (BDAC) model to improve the firm performance (FPER). While analyzing big data and predictive analytics (BDPA) for supply chain and organizational performance, he indicated that connectivity, information sharing, and top management commitment positively influence BDPA acceptance, which in turn leads to BDPA assimilation through routinization, and ultimately positively impacts SCP and OP. In 2019, he published a paper that presented the positive influence of BDPA on social and environmental sustainability, followed by a related study mentioning the effects of BDA on performance and supply chain agility and accountability, and its implementation at organizational level. Furthermore, in 2020 he developed a consumer goods company innovation (CGCI) conceptual framework, showcasing how digital BDA firms aid consumer goods companies in product testing and innovation prior to market launch.

=== Radio frequency identification (RFID) ===
Fosso has been accredited for his research in the field of radio frequency identification, he has investigated its potential and implementation in several business models, particularly in electronic commerce. In 2006, he indicated RFID as a disruptive technology as it requires major redesigning, supports new business modules and promotes higher electronic integration between supply chain members. Later in the same year, he demonstrated the integration of RFID technology into information systems applications, highlighting how it leads to process optimization, and tracked the key performance indicators that aid to evaluate its impact RFID technology on a five-layer supply chain in the utility sector and in ecommerce applications. Afterwards, in 2008, he explored the impact of RFID and electronic product code (EPC) on mobile B2B eCommerce and identified it as an appropriate approach that helps in fostering higher level of information and improves "shipping," "receiving," and "put-away" processes. In a collaborative study with Harold Beck in 2008, he elucidated that buyer-supplier relationship plays a crucial role in shaping the RFID infrastructure and the consequences related to its implementation, and also mentioned the potential of RFID and EPC in enhancing the information flow in retail supply chain. In 2012, he explained how RFID act like an enabler to facilitate the seamless integration of timely and accurate data flows into information systems, streamline business processes through automation, enhance system-to-system communication, and improve inter- and intra-organizational integration of business processes.

=== Artificial intelligence (AI) ===
Fosso has also focused his research expertise in the field of artificial intelligence with a particular interest in comprehending its implementation and practices and its impact on enhancing business values and firm performance and organizational and process levels. In a collaborative study he proposed a Multi-criteria decision-making (MCDM) technique that uses AI algorithms like Fuzzy systems, Wavelet Neural Networks (WNN), and Evaluation based on Distance from Average Solution (EDAS) to discover patterns in AI techniques for creating SCRes strategies. In 2022, he published a paper on the implementation of AI in ecommerce and provided guidelines to use information research for it, and have discussed the positive influence of AI in operational supply chain management and organizational and customer agility. Furthermore, he proposed a method, known as informed AI (IAI) that involves the incorporation of human domain expertise into AI, resulting in more effective and dependable procedures for data labeling and model explainability. Apart from business modules, he has also worked on the implementation of AI in digital health as well as its Implications for information systems research.

=== Block chain technologies ===
Fosso has also examined various aspects of blockchain technologies, including their implementation in supply chain management, associated challenges,and factors enabling their use in logistics. His research on blockchain adoption by supply chain management and operations has revealed that it is influenced by effort expectancy, social influence, facilitating influence, and trust. Additionally, he explored the potential influence of block chain technologies on supply chain management and indicated an improved supply chain performance. In related research, he clarified the definitions of Bitcoin, Blockchain, and Fintech and presented their applications, benefits, and challenges in various industries.

== Bibliography ==
=== Selected books ===
- Enterprise and Organizational Modeling and Simulation (2016) ISBN 978-3662448595
- Transformation de la supply chain grâce aux systèmes d'information (2017) ISBN 978-3841634771
- Facteurs d'acceptation & d'utilisation du SIRH dans les entreprises: Une étude empirique dans les entreprises camerounaises et influence du SIRH sur la performance individuelle (2017) ISBN 978-3838147543

=== Selected articles ===
- Wamba, S. F., Queiroz, M. M., Guthrie, C., & Braganza, A. (2022). Industry experiences of artificial intelligence (AI): benefits and challenges in operations and supply chain management. Production Planning & Control, 33(16), 1493–1497.
- Wamba, S. F. (2022). Impact of artificial intelligence assimilation on firm performance: The mediating effects of organizational agility and customer agility. International Journal of Information Management, 67, 102544.
- Wamba, S. F., Akter, S., Edwards, A., Chopin, G., & Gnanzou, D. (2015). How 'big data'can make big impact: Findings from a systematic review and a longitudinal case study. International journal of production economics, 165, 234–246.
- Wamba, S. F., Kala Kamdjoug, J. R., Epie Bawack, R., & Keogh, J. G. (2020). Bitcoin, Blockchain and Fintech: a systematic review and case studies in the supply chain. Production Planning & Control, 31(2–3), 115–142.
- Wamba, S. F., Gunasekaran, A., Akter, S., Ren, S. J. F., Dubey, R., & Childe, S. J. (2017). Big data analytics and firm performance: Effects of dynamic capabilities. Journal of Business Research, 70, 356–365.
- Queiroz, M. M., & Wamba, S. F. (2019). Blockchain adoption challenges in supply chain: An empirical investigation of the main drivers in India and the USA. International Journal of Information Management, 46, 70–82.
- Wamba, S. F., Queiroz, M. M., Blome, C., & Sivarajah, U. (2023). Fostering financial inclusion in a developing country: Predicting user acceptance of mobile wallets in Cameroon. In Research Anthology on Microfinance Services and Roles in Social Progress (pp. 545–575). IGI Global.
