= Cover My Tracks =

Studio album by Charlie Fink
- Released: 2 June 2017
- Length: 29:15
- Label: Hangman Records

Singles from Cover My Tracks
- 1. "Firecracker" Released: 6 April 2017; 2. "Anywhere You're Going Is on My Way" Released: 27 April 2017; 3. "I Was Born to Be a Cowboy" Released: 4 May 2017

Cover My Tracks is the first studio album by English singer-songwriter Charlie Fink. The record was released 2 June 2017. The album is paired with a stage play of the same name.

== Background ==
Following on from the break-up of English indie rock band Noah and the Whale, of which he was the frontman and songwriter, Fink released a song in mid-2015 on his SoundCloud called "My Heartbeat Lost Its Rhythm". Fink then began to write for productions at the Old Vic, including The Lorax, as well as writing the music for the film A Street Cat Named Bob.

In early April 2017, the Old Vic announced a new show for June of the same year, called Cover My Tracks, in which Fink would be starring. At the same time, Fink announced he would be releasing a studio album of the same name, releasing a single "Firecracker" on his Vevo, and announcing a release date of 2 June 2017.

== Track listing ==
All tracks are written by Charlie Fink

No.	Title	Length
1.	"Firecracker"	3:07
2.	"Anywhere You're Going Is on My Way"	1:56
3.	"I Was Born to Be a Cowboy"	2:56
4.	"The End of the Legendary Hearts"	2:44
5.	"Give Me the Road"	2:34
6.	"Orpheus Is Playing the Troubadour"	2:49
7.	"The Howl"	3:12
8.	"I'm Through"	2:35
9.	"Someone Above Me Tonight"	3:52
10.	"Here Is Where We'll Meet"	2:04
11.	"Firecracker, Pt.2" (instrumental)	1:26

== Release history ==
Region	Date	Format	Label
United Kingdom	2 June 2017	CD and digital download	Hangman Records
