= Tonight's the Kind of Night =

Single by Noah and the Whale

from the album Last Night on Earth
- Released: 15 May 2011
- Genre: Indie pop
- Length: 3:10
- Label: Mercury
- Songwriter(s): Charlie Fink
- Producer(s): Jason Lader, Charlie Fink

Noah and the Whale singles chronology
| ""L.I.F.E. G.O.E.S.O.N."" (2011) | "Tonight's the Kind of Night" (2011) | "Life is Life" (2011) |

"Tonight's the Kind of Night" is a song by English folk band Noah and the Whale. The single served as the second single from the band's third studio album, Last Night on Earth. The single was released in the United Kingdom as a digital download on 15 May 2011. The backing of the chorus is heavily influenced by the intro chords of The Who's Baba O'Riley. An instrumental version of the song was used as the introduction to the 2012 Summer Olympics opening and closing ceremonies.

== Music video ==
The music video for the song appeared on their YouTube channel on 11 April 2011.

== Track listing ==
Promo CD single
| No. | Title | Length |
|---|---|---|
| 1. | "Tonight's the Kind of Night" | 3:09 |

Digital download
| No. | Title | Length |
|---|---|---|
| 1. | "Tonight's the Kind of Night" | 3:10 |

Digital download – Remix
| No. | Title | Length |
|---|---|---|
| 1. | "Tonight's the Kind of Night" (RAC Remix) | 3:39 |

== Chart performance ==
"Tonight's the Kind of Night" debuted on the UK Singles Chart on 8 May 2011 at number 87, and rose to No. 74 a week later.

=== Charts ===
| Chart (2011) | Peak position |
|---|---|
| Belgium (Ultratop 50 Flanders) | 66 |
| UK Singles (The Official Charts Company) | 67 |

== Credits and personnel ==
- Lead vocals – Noah and the Whale
- Producers – Charlie Fink, Jason Lader
- Lyrics – Charlie Fink
- Label: Mercury Records

== Release history ==
| Region | Date | Format | Label |
|---|---|---|---|
| United Kingdom | 15 May 2011 | Digital download | Mercury Records |
