= L.I.F.E.G.O.E.S.O.N. =

2011 single by Noah and the Whale

Single by Noah and the Whale

from the album Last Night on Earth
- Released: 21 January 2011
- Genre: Indie folk
- Length: 3:46
- Label: Mercury
- Songwriter: Charlie Fink
- Producers: Charlie Fink, Jason Lader

Noah and the Whale singles chronology
"Blue Skies" (2009)	"L.I.F.E.G.O.E.S.O.N." (2011)	"Tonight's the Kind of Night" (2011)

"L.I.F.E.G.O.E.S.O.N." is a song by English folk band Noah and the Whale. The single served as the lead single from the band's third studio album, Last Night on Earth. The single was released in the United Kingdom as a digital download on 21 January 2011, peaking at number 14 on the UK Singles Chart and number 26 on the Irish Singles Chart.

The song has been noted for similarities to Lola by The Kinks.

== Chart performance ==
"L.I.F.E.G.O.E.S.O.N." debuted on the UK Singles Chart on 30 January 2011 at number 37. The following week, the single rose 7 places to number 30; before spending four consecutive weeks between the number 30 and 40 positions. On 13 March, the single climbed 12 places from number 31 to number 19; falling a single place to number 20 the week after. Following a performance on Dancing on Ice, the single rose 6 places to a current peak of number 14; marking the band's second highest charting single since "5 Years Time". In 2011, "L.I.F.E.G.O.E.S.O.N." sold 242,000 copies in the UK. The song made its debut on the Irish Singles Chart on 3 February 2011 at number 48, climbing 12 places to number 35 the following week; where it spent two consecutive weeks then reached number twenty-six. The song was the 5th highest selling rock single of 2011 in the UK.

== Music video ==
The music video for the song appeared on their YouTube channel on 7 January 2011 and stars both the band and British actor Dan Westwick.

== Track listing ==
Digital download
No.	Title	Length
1.	"L.I.F.E.G.O.E.S.O.N."	3:46

== Credits and personnel ==
- Lead vocals, guitar – Charlie Fink
- Violin – Tom Hobden
- Bass guitar – Matt Owens
- Guitar – Fred Abbott
- Drums – Jack Hamson
- Producers – Charlie Fink, Jason Lader
- Lyrics – Charlie Fink
- Label: Mercury Records

== Charts ==
=== Weekly charts ===
Chart (2011)	Peak position
Belgium (Ultratip Bubbling Under Flanders)	4
Ireland (IRMA)	26
Scotland Singles (OCC)	14
UK Singles (OCC)	14

=== Year-end charts ===
Chart (2011)	Position
UK Singles (OCC)	91

== Certifications ==
Region	Certification	Certified units/sales
United Kingdom (BPI)	Platinum	600,000^{‡}
^{‡} Sales+streaming figures based on certification alone.

== Release history ==
Region	Date	Format	Label
United Kingdom	21 January 2011	Digital download	Mercury Records
