= Orphan Colours =

- Origin: London, England
- Genres: Americana, folk rock, alternative country
- Years active: 2015-present
- Members: Steve "Seebs" Llewellyn (Lead Vocals & Guitar); Graham Knight (Bass/Backing Vocals); Steve Brookes (Drums); Fred Abbot (Lead Guitar); Dave Burn (Backing Vocals/Guitar)
- Website: OrphanColours.com

Orphan Colours is a British band formed by former Ahab members Steve "Seebs" Llewellyn and Dave Burn. They have been dubbed a "supergroup" because they are joined by former Noah and the Whale guitarist Fred Abbot, Danny and the Champions of the World drummer Steve Brookes and prominent member of the London folk revival scene Graham Knight.

The band signed to at the Helm Records in 2017 and released All on Red on 26 January 2018. Their debut album was nominated in the 'Best UK Americana Album' category at the 2019 Americana Music Association U.K. Awards.

== Discography ==
- High Hopes EP (26 February 2016)
- Won't Let You Down (28 January 2016)
- All on Red (26 January 2018)
