= Blue Skies (Noah and the Whale song) =

Single by Noah and the Whale

from the album The First Days of Spring
- Released: 23 August 2009
- Genre: Alternative; anti-folk
- Length: 3:40
- Label: Mercury
- Songwriter(s): Charlie Fink

Noah and the Whale singles chronology
"Shape of My Heart" (2008)	"Blue Skies" (2009)	"L.I.F.E.G.O.E.S.O.N." (2011)

"Blue Skies" is the only official single from English folk band Noah and the Whale's album The First Days of Spring. It was released on 24 August 2009. The song was not only the album's lead single, but also served as a 'theme' for the album, with excerpts appearing throughout the other tracks, most notably on Our Window.

== Music video ==
The video for the song is introduced by the conversation between two friends, when one of them suggests that they should "go on" and live, which they had only done "a long time ago". It also serves as the film's trailer.

== In pop culture ==
"Blue Skies" is featured in the official trailer for Alexander Payne's 2011 film, "The Descendants" starring George Clooney It was also used in the One Tree Hill episode "Some Roads Lead Nowhere" which first aired on 7 December 2009.

== Track listing ==
Digital download
No.	Title	Length
1.	"Blue Skies" (Radio Edit)	3:40
2.	"Blue Skies" (The Twelves Remix)	4:54
3.	"Blue Skies" (YACHT Remix)	5:34
4.	"Blue Skies" (Death to the Throne Remix)	3:57

== Charts ==
Chart (2008)	Peak position
UK Singles (OCC)	95

== Release history ==
Region	Date	Format	Label
United Kingdom	23 August 2009	Digital download	Mercury Records
