= Hampton School =

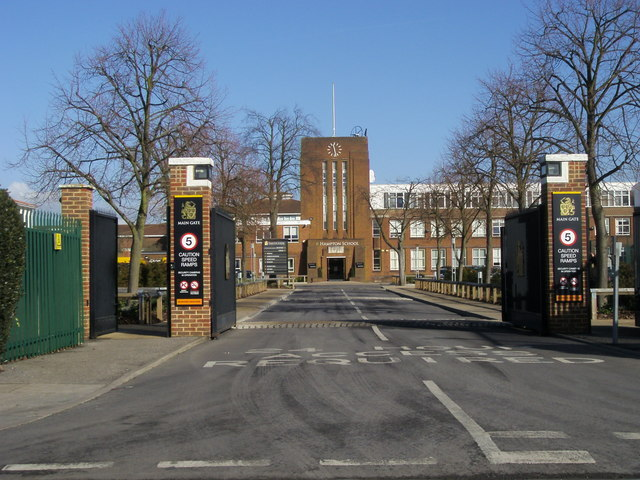
- Hampton School main building and gate, opened 1939, as seen in 2013

Location
- Hanworth Road, Hampton; London Borough of Richmond upon Thames, TW12 3HD; England

Information
- Type: Private school Senior school Day school
- Motto: Praestat Opes Sapientia (Wisdom surpasses wealth)
- Established: 1557; 469 years ago (closed 1573) Re-founding 1612; First grammar school, 1697 (closed 1830); Second grammar school, 1834; As fee-paying grammar school 1868 (bankrupt 1909); Under government control 1910; As voluntary-aided 1955 As private school, 1975; 51 years ago
- Founder: Robert Hammond
- Department for Education URN: 102946 Tables
- Headmaster: Kevin Knibbs
- Gender: Boys
- Age range: 11-18
- Enrolment: 1,567
- Capacity: 1,650
- Student to teacher ratio: 8:1
- Campus size: 28-acre (11 ha)
- Campus type: Suburban
- Colours: Black and yellow
- Budget: £32,436,237 (2025) ▼£1,374,040 (4%) £33,810,277 (2024)
- School fees: 2026/27: £31,248 per full academic year (plus other charges) ▲£1,332 (4%) 2025/26: £29,916 per full academic year (plus other charges) ▲£3,876 (15%) 2024/25: £26,040 ▲£1,320 (5%) 2023/24: £24,720
- Revenue: £35,748,842 (2025) ▼£159,092 (4%) £35,907,934 (2024)
- Website: http://www.hamptonschool.org.uk/

Hampton School is a private day school for boys aged 11-18 in Hampton, London, England. As of the 2024–2025 academic year, the school charges a minimum of £29,916 per year for attendance (plus additional charges). Until 1975, the school was a voluntary aided grammar school, with no fees.

In 2021, 92% of the school's pupils achieved grades A* or A at A Level. The school features 40th in one ranking of private schools in the United Kingdom by A-Level results.

It has a preparatory school attached to it, for girls aged 3–7 and boys aged 3–11. It is next to The Lady Eleanor Holles School for girls, with which it co-operates in a number of co-curricular activities and shares several classes, clubs, facilities (including a swimming pool) and a coach service.

The headmaster receives a salary of between £400,000 and £450,000 per year.

== History ==
In 1557, Robert Hammond, a wealthy brewer who was the largest tax-payer in Hampton, left in his will property for the maintenance of a "free scole" and to build a small schoolhouse "with seates in yt" in the churchyard of St Mary's Church, Hampton. The endowment was the Bell Inn, some other houses, and one acre of land. Hammond also founded a school at Kingston-upon-Thames.

To mark this early history, Founders' Day is celebrated by the school towards the end of each academic year. The occasion is marked by a procession of boys walking from the school to St Mary's Parish Church, Hampton for a service including the school choir singing and readings.

Although the school was founded in 1557, there was provision in Hammond's will that the school would only continue as long as the vicar, churchwardens and parishioners carried out his requests. If not, then the properties would revert to his heirs. It seems that the school did not survive beyond 1568, or possibly earlier, and the properties reverted to the heirs.

Subsequently, however, the school re-opened in 1612. This was as a result of a commission established to enquire into the fate of Tudor charities that had disappeared for various reasons. The "learned counsell on bothe sides" reached deadlock at the commissioners. However, in the spirit of compromise and through the generosity of the then legal owner of the properties, Nicholas Pigeon, the school was re-endowed.

The early school was on the site of St Mary's Church by the River Thames. It moved to a site on Upper Sunbury Road in 1880. The new school buildings cost £8,000 and were built in the Elizabethan Tudor style to accommodate 125 day boys and 25 boarders. The school moved to its present site on Hanworth Road in 1939. The new 28-acre site allowed for expansion and the potential to provide for 600–650 boys. The foundation stone was laid on 5 July 1938 and a year later the school was opened.

In 1975, the school converted from voluntary aided status to become a fee-paying private school, after government changes to the administration of secondary education under the Education Act 1975.

Headmaster Barry Martin retired in July 2013 after 16 years of service. He was succeeded by Kevin Knibbs in September 2013.

== Sexual abuse cases ==
There have been two incidents in recent years that involved crimes of sexual abuse perpetrated by teachers whilst at Hampton School.

In 2020, Andrew Cook was found guilty of 37 sexual offences relating to pupils at the school while working as a teacher between 2011 and 2018. He was sentenced to a 6-year jail term. He had posed as a 16-year-old girl on social media, asked for, and received naked photos from several boys over nine years. Cook was a rowing coach at the school. The school dismissed him following an internal investigation in 2018.

In 2022, Christopher Arnold pleaded guilty and was added to the sex offenders register after filming through the window of a female shower room as someone was undressing inside. Arnold, a computer science teacher and assistant head of year, was in a romantic relationship with another teacher at the school.

== Notable alumni ==
- Simon Amor (1992–97), former England 7s captain
- Zafar Ansari (2005–10), Surrey and England cricketer
- Kenneth Baker, Baron Baker of Dorking, (1946–48), former Home Secretary and Secretary of State for Education
- Andy Beattie (1992–97), former rugby union player for Exeter Chiefs and Bath Rugby
- Jamie Benson, rugby union player at Ulster Rugby
- Paul Brand, Professor of Legal History at the University of Oxford
- Vic Briggs, musician (Brian Auger and The Trinity; Eric Burdon & The Animals)
- Paul Casey (1989–95), professional golfer (15 DP World Tour event wins)
- Monty Munford (1972–79), Bollywood actor and writer for The Economist, Forbes and The Telegraph
- Thurston Dart (1933–38), musicologist and harpsichordist
- Michael Denley (1931–2013), Olympic athlete
- Keith Faulkner (1955–62), chairman, Working Links, Manpower
- Tom Gearing (2003–2006), finalist of the Apprentice
- Andrew Hall, hedge fund manager
- Walter Hayes, Sunday Dispatch editor, senior executive at the Ford Motor Company
- Murray Head (1959–62), musician
- Geoff Hunt (1959–66), former president of the Royal Society of Marine Artists
- Matthew Hurles, Professor at the University of Cambridge
- Tony James, musician
- Joshua King, Premier League footballer for Fulham FC
- Max Kretzschmar (2007–2010), footballer at Wycombe Wanderers FC
- Louis Lynagh (2012–2019), rugby player for Benetton Rugby and Italy
- Peter Lovesey (1948–55), author
- Chris Martin, ocean rowing oarsman
- Mike Martin (1996-2001), Liberal Democrat MP for Tunbridge Wells
- Sir Brian May (1958–65), musician (Queen)
- Jim McCarty (1955–62) founding member of The Yardbirds
- Zach Miles (1964–71), chairman, Vedior
- Matt Brittin (1979–86), director general of the BBC
- Iain Morris (1984–91) co-writer of E4's The Inbetweeners
- Daniel Pemberton, (1989–96) composer of hit films such as Project Hail Mary and Spiderman: Into the Spiderverse
- Toby Roland-Jones (1999–2006), cricketer, Middlesex and England
- Paul Samwell-Smith (1955–62) founding member of The Yardbirds
- John Scott (1960–1968) sociologist and former pro vice-chancellor, Plymouth University
- Greg Searle (1983–90), Olympic gold-winning oarsman
- Jonny Searle (1980–87), Olympic gold-winning oarsman
- Barry Sheerman (1951–57), Labour MP for Huddersfield since 1983 and chairman of the Education Select Committee
- Graham Skinner, Air Vice Marshal (1956–63)
- Ollie Stanhope, Paralympic gold-winning oarsman
- Michael Sterling (1957–64) Vice-Chancellor of Brunel University and the University of Birmingham
- Dave Travis (1957–1964) UK international athlete, former UK record holder at javelin
- Michael Underwood (1737–1820), surgeon and writer on surgery, discoverer of infantile paralysis
- Sir Peter Wykeham-Barnes, World War II flying ace (1926–28)
- Zia Yusuf, businessman and political campaigner, Reform UK Spokesperson for Home Affairs

== Notable staff ==
- Martin Cross – Olympic gold-winning oarsman, 1984
- Maurice Xiberras – Last leader of the Integration with Britain Party (IWBP) in Gibraltar
- Andy Beattie – former rugby union player for Exeter Chiefs and Bath Rugby and current coach of the school's 1XV team.

== Sources ==
- Wild, Edward & Rice, Ken (2005) School by the Thames. Frome: Butler and Tanner Ltd (Ken Rice retired from teaching history at Hampton in 2007)
- Hampton School Book
