= Shape of My Heart (Noah and the Whale song) =

Single by Noah and the Whale

from the album Peaceful, the World Lays Me Down
- Released: 5 May 2008
- Genre: Indie folk
- Length: 2:55
- Label: Mercury
- Songwriter(s): Charlie Fink

Noah and the Whale singles chronology
"2 Bodies 1 Heart" (2008)	"Shape of My Heart" (2008)	"5 Years Time" (2008)
"5 Years Time [re-release]" (2008)	"Shape of My Heart [re-release]" (2008)	"Blue Skies" (2009)

"Shape of My Heart" is a song by English indie folk band Noah and the Whale, released on 5 May 2008 as the third single from their debut studio album Peaceful, the World Lays Me Down (2008). It was re-released on 20 October 2008.

== Music video ==
=== Original release ===
The music video was released onto YouTube on 8 April 2008.

It is an homage to the many sci-fi and horror movies made from the 1950s to the 1980s by the famous Mexican wrestler El Santo. It has him starting off with a sombrero playing a guitar and a girl fanning herself, the rest beating up a whale. Then a man with a mask walks by and gets showered by petals of flowers, he then enters the house and saves a woman from a communist, and starts working out but then he gets interrupted by Wolf Boy whom he defeats. He is then seen peeing and defeats Vampirella after washing his hands. He later defeats Mr. One Eye and Killer Robot whilst the band play in the background. He and the girl defeat Frank; she smashes a bottle over his head, they fall in love and kiss whilst the band high-five.

=== Re-release ===
The music video for the re-release was released onto YouTube on 23 September 2008. It was recorded in Cemaes Bay, Isle of Anglesey.

== Track listing ==
1. "Shape of My Heart"
2. "Jealous Kind of Love"
3. "Jocasta"

== Charts ==
Chart (2008)	Peak position
UK Singles (OCC)	94
