= Life Is Life (song) =

Single by Noah and the Whale

"Life is Life"

Single by Noah and the Whale

from the album Last Night on Earth
- Released: 8 August 2011
- Genre: Alternative rock
- Length: 3:37
- Label: Mercury
- Songwriter(s): Charlie Fink
- Producer(s): Charlie Fink, Jason Lader

Noah and the Whale singles chronology
"Tonight's the Kind of Night" (2011)	"Life is Life" (2011)	"Waiting For My Chance to Come" (2011)

"Life is Life" is a song by English folk band Noah and the Whale. The single served as the third single from the band's third studio album, Last Night on Earth. The single was released in the United Kingdom on 8 August 2011. It peaked at number 172 on the UK Singles Chart.

== Music video ==
The music video for the song appeared on their YouTube channel on 20 June 2011.

== Track listing ==
Promo CD single
No.	Title	Length
1.	"Life is Life"	3:37

Album version
No.	Title	Length
1.	"Life is Life"	3:37

== Chart performance ==
Chart (2011)	Peak position
UK Singles (The Official Charts Company)	172

== Credits and personnel ==
- Lead vocals – Noah and the Whale
- Producers – Charlie Fink, Jason Lader
- Lyrics – Charlie Fink
- Label: Mercury Records

== Release history ==
Region	Date	Format	Label
United Kingdom	8 August 2011	Digital download	Mercury Records
