= Ashby Florence =

Comedian (born 2000)

Ashby Florence (born November 22, 2000) is a designer and comedian who uploads content to various streaming sites, such as TikTok, YouTube, and Instagram. She specializes in crude humor, characters, improv, and livestreams.

== Career ==
Florence first went viral in 2025, after clips of her live-streams in which she dressed as the Lorax spread on TikTok. She later received attention for dressing as Alexander Hamilton from the musical Hamilton. In December 2025, Florence presented the Live Creator of the Year Award at the TikTok Awards.

Ashby's partner Ben Hunt creates content with her.

By February 2026, Florence had accumulated 2.4 million TikTok followers. In March 2026, Florence was an award presenter at the 45th Daytime Emmy Awards.

Florence designs comic books. She plays guitar, sings, and has shared original songs on TikTok.
