= Andy Beattie (rugby union) =

English rugby union player

- Born: Andrew Beattie; 6 September 1978 (age 48) London, England
- Height: 1.98 m (6 ft 6 in)
- Weight: 115 kg (18 st 2 lb)
- School: The Mall School; Hampton School
- University: Exeter University

Rugby union career
- Position: Flanker
Senior career
Years	Team	Apps	(Points)
1997–2001	Exeter Chiefs	51	(80)
2001–2012	Bath	209	(85)
International career
Years	Team	Apps	(Points)
2004–2005	England A		

Andy Beattie (born 6 September 1978) is a retired English rugby union player. He played back row forward for Bath and Exeter Chiefs between 1997 and 2012.

== Career ==
Beattie was educated at The Mall School, an independent school in Twickenham and at the independent Hampton School, in Middlesex, and at Exeter University, where he gained a degree in Sports Science. In 1997 he was a member of one of England's finest 18 Group sides, together with such players as Iain Balshaw, Mike Tindall, Jonny Wilkinson, Andrew Sheridan and Steve Borthwick. While at Exeter University, between 1997 and 2001, he played for Exeter RFC. After graduating from Exeter University he joined Bath. In 2004, Beattie started every Premiership match including the final against London Wasps at Twickenham.

Beattie has, however, suffered significant injury problems throughout his time at the Recreation Ground and broke his leg while playing for England A against France A on his home ground in early 2005.

He regained full fitness during the summer of 2005 before returning to Bath colours in the autumn of that year.

Beattie signed a new two-year contract with Bath in early 2009.

As of 19 March 2012, Beattie has announced his retirement with immediate effect at the age of 33. Beattie has struggled to come back from an ankle injury he sustained playing against Glasgow in pool 3 of the Heineken Cup in January 2012.
