= Noah and the Whale Presents the A Sides =

EP by Noah and the Whale
- Released: 25 December 2008
- Label: Mercury Limited

Noah and the Whale Presents the A Sides is a limited edition EP released on 25 December 2008 by the folk rock band Noah and the Whale on Mercury Records Limited. Only 2500 copies of the album were released on 12" vinyl with all of the proceeds going towards the charity Age Concern.

Recorded over two nights with a two-take limit, the album is described on the Young And Lost Club website as "A mixture of unheard originals and covers, and ground-breaking artwork from the band’s long-term collaborator Alex Brenchley, the raw raucous punk energy of the recordings promises to dislocate ossicles and fracture conventional musical sensibilities."

The band was inspired to make the proceeds out to Age Concern after visiting the retirement home of Cyril, the grandfather of one of the band members. Cyril was also the inspiration behind the song "To Cyril At Crunkmas" that was available as a free download from the group's Facebook page, along with the album's opening track "If My Album Sold a Million".

== Track listing ==
The EP consists of seven songs:

1. "If My Album Sold a Million"
2. "Hold My Hand as I'm Lowered"
3. "Don't Look Back"
4. "Waster"
5. "Fiddles Cannon"
6. "Don't Let the Sun Go Down On Your Grievances"
7. "Setting Sun"
