= The First Days of Spring (album) =

Studio album by Noah and the Whale
- Released: 31 August 2009
- Recorded: January 2009
- Genre: Indie folk
- Length: 42:53
- Label: Vertigo (UK); Cherrytree Records (US)
- Producer: Emery Dobyns, Charlie Fink

Noah and the Whale chronology
Peaceful, the World Lays Me Down (2008)	The First Days of Spring (2009)	Last Night on Earth (2011)

The First Days of Spring is the second studio album by the English band Noah and the Whale. It was released in the UK on 31 August 2009 and in the US on 6 October. The band began playing the new material at concerts in 2009 to a favourable response. The First Days of Spring notably differs from Noah and the Whale's debut album, Peaceful, the World Lays Me Down, by the presence of a running narrative describing the break-up of a relationship and by the lack of female vocals. The break-up addressed on this album is the break-up between lead singer Charlie Fink and former member Laura Marling, whose departure from the band led to the absence of female vocals. The Deluxe Edition of the album includes the film which is also titled The First Days of Spring. A trailer of the movie is available on their official website. An online campaign for the release of the album onto vinyl was set up in 2014.

== Singles ==
"The First Days of Spring" is the first single release from the album and it is already available on the band's website. The first official single is "Blue Skies" which was released on 24 August 2009.

== Reception ==
Professional ratings
Aggregate scores
Source	Rating
Metacritic	71/100
Review scores
Source	Rating
AllMusic	4/5 stars
The Guardian	3/5 stars
MusicOMH	2/5 stars
NME	9/10
The Observer	4/5 stars
Pitchfork	5.2/10
Spin	2/5 stars
Sputnikmusic	4.5/5 stars
The Times	5/5 stars

The First Days of Spring has been met with very positive reviews, showing more critical acclaim than their previous release. NME called the album "immense" and gave it a strong 9/10, whilst The Times awarded the album a full five stars.

Towards the end of 2009 The Guardian newspaper put it at number 7 in their top albums of 2009. The Times newspaper put the album at number 9, and was also in Amazon's top albums of 2009.

== Track listing ==
All songs written by Charlie Fink.

The First Days of Spring track listing
No.	Title	Length
1.	"The First Days of Spring"	6:39
2.	"Our Window"	5:48
3.	"I Have Nothing"	2:43
4.	"My Broken Heart"	5:11
5.	"Instrumental I"	1:33
6.	"Love of an Orchestra"	2:03
7.	"Instrumental II"	1:36
8.	"Stranger"	5:18
9.	"Blue Skies"	4:08
10.	"Slow Glass"	3:18
11.	"My Door Is Always Open"	4:35
Total length:		42:53

== Charts ==
Chart performance for The First Days of Spring
Chart (2009)	Peak position
Scottish Albums (OCC)	22
UK Albums (OCC)	16
US Heatseekers Albums (Billboard)	19
