= Peaceful, the World Lays Me Down =

Studio album by Noah and the Whale
- Released: 11 August 2008
- Recorded: 2007
- Genres: Indie folk, indie pop
- Length: 41:59
- Labels: Mercury, Cherrytree
- Producers: Eliot James, Charlie Fink

Noah and the Whale chronology
Peaceful, the World Lays Me Down (2008)	The First Days of Spring (2009)

Singles from Peaceful, the World Lays Me Down
- 1. "5 Years Time" Released: 2007; 2. "2 Bodies 1 Heart" Released: 2008; 3. "Shape of My Heart" Released: 5 May 2008; 4. "5 Years Time" Released: 4 August 2008 (re-release); 5. "Shape of My Heart" Released: 20 October 2008 (re-release)

Professional ratings
Aggregate scores
Source	Rating
Metacritic	60/100
Review scores
Source	Rating
AllMusic	3.5/5 stars
BBC Music	
The Guardian	3/5 stars
NME	6/10
Pitchfork	2.6/10

Peaceful, the World Lays Me Down is the debut album by the English band Noah and the Whale. It was released on 11 August 2008 in the United Kingdom, and on 16 September 2008 in the United States. The band has since become very popular, especially in the UK, in spite of the record receiving mixed or average reviews.

== Singles ==
1. The first single was "5 Years Time", which was released in 2007.
2. The second single was "2 Bodies 1 Heart", which was released in 2008 but not included on the album. However, the video was released on the deluxe edition of the album.
3. The third single was "Shape of My Heart", which was released on 5 May 2008. It was their first single to chart, reaching 94 in the UK singles chart and spending one week on the chart.
4. The fourth single was the re-release of their debut single "5 Years Time". After the re-release on 4 August 2008, the song debuted at number 24 in the UK. It achieved a peak position of 7 and has spent 15 weeks on the chart. In Ireland it debuted at number 47 and achieved a peak position of 10 during its six weeks on the chart. "5 Years Time" is their highest charted song so far.
5. The fifth single was a re-release of their third single "Shape of My Heart". It was released on 20 October 2008.

== Track listing ==
All songs written by Charlie Fink.

=== Standard edition ===
1. "2 Atoms in a Molecule" – 2:05
2. "Jocasta" – 2:49
3. "Shape of My Heart" – 2:54
4. "Do What You Do" – 4:17
5. "Give a Little Love" – 4:15
6. "Second Lover" – 4:04
7. "5 Years Time" – 3:35
8. "Rocks and Daggers" – 4:33
9. "Peaceful, the World Lays Me Down" – 6:15
10. "Mary" – 3:28
11. "Hold My Hand as I'm Lowered" – 3:46

=== Deluxe edition ===
12. "Shape of My Heart" (music video)
13. "2 Bodies 1 Heart" (music video)
14. "5 Years Time" (music video)

== Charts ==
Chart performance for Peaceful, the World Lays Me Down
Chart (2009)	Peak position
Irish Albums (IRMA)	32
Scottish Albums (Official Charts)	9
UK Albums (Official Charts)	5
