= Last Night on Earth (Noah and the Whale album) =

Studio album by Noah and the Whale
- Released: 4 March 2011
- Recorded: 2010
- Studios: Sunset Sound Recorders, Sound City, Doghouse (Hollywood, California); The Garden (San Francisco, California); Ruby Red Productions (Santa Monica, California); The Strongroom, The Empire Studio, Hangman Palace Studios (London, England)
- Genre: Indie pop
- Length: 33:29
- Label: Mercury
- Producers: Jason Lader and Charlie Fink

Noah and the Whale chronology
The First Days of Spring (2009)	Last Night on Earth (2011)	Heart of Nowhere (2013)

Singles from Last Night on Earth
- 1. "L.I.F.E.G.O.E.S.O.N." Released: 23 January 2011; 2. "Tonight's the Kind of Night" Released: 15 May 2011; 3. "Life Is Life" Released: 8 August 2011; 4. "Waiting For My Chance to Come" Released: 12 September 2011 (music video)

Professional ratings
Aggregate scores
Source	Rating
Metacritic	67/100
Review scores
Source	Rating
AllMusic	3.5/5 stars
NME	8/10 stars
Pitchfork	5.0/10
Spin	7/10 stars

Last Night on Earth is the third studio album by the English indie folk band Noah and the Whale. It was released digitally on 4 March 2011, and physically on 7 March 2011 on Mercury Records. It peaked to number 8 on the UK Albums Chart. The first single from the album was "L.I.F.E.G.O.E.S.O.N.", and the song "Wild Thing" is available to download for free from their website.

== Background ==
Following The First Days of Spring (2009), the band's original drummer, Doug Fink, left to complete his medical training. The group's new addition, Michael Petulla, was found via online classified Gumtree. Bassist Matt Owens and guitarist Fred Abbott auditioned upwards of 100 drummers and eventually narrowed it down to 10, from which point the band rehearsed with each to see which was the best fit. Petulla, the last auditionee of the day, was picked. The band first began recording Last Night on Earth in 2010 at Bethnal Green Great Synagogue in London, but the band eventually needed a change in scenery and moved to Los Angeles to work with producer Jason Lader. The band started at the synagogue due its spacious sound, but ended up working with Lader based on his work with Jay-Z and Julian Casablancas.

Vocalist/guitarist Charlie Fink wrote of adolescence and, in his words, "that excitement of being young and being in the night." The ambition was unapologetically fuelled by the music of Bruce Springsteen. In addition, Last Night on Earth is influenced by several different sources, including Tom Waits's 1992 album Bone Machine, the poetry of Frank O'Hara, the art of Edward Hopper, and the work of John Cale, Arthur Russell and Lou Reed. Reed's Berlin (1973) was particularly influential on Fink's desire to step outside his comfort zone, lyrically. "Once you've opened up the third-person narrative it means you have to rely less on your own life and it's more fantasy and fiction," said Fink, whose songwriting expanded to a "strikingly visual style," inspired by cinema. The process, Fink felt, exerted a tangible influence on the way he approached lyrics on Last Night on Earth. The album, in contrast to the band's prior two efforts, is a move away from autobiography, and tells short stories in song. For example, "Wild Thing" began as a 10-minute, richly detailed epic in the style of Street Hassle, before Fink boiled it down to its five-minute essence. The track, another instance of Fink's cinema-inspired songwriting, was designed to have a "Twin Peaks feel."

Following the commercial success of Last Night on Earth, the band toured extensively, including three separate treks to the United States. "There was a week where we did Japan, Australia, Canada and Chicago in eight days. And I hate flying," remarked Fink.

== Singles ==
- "L.I.F.E.G.O.E.S.O.N." was released on 23 January 2011 as the first single from their album. Having debuted at number 37, the single spent a total of 8 weeks in the top 40 before reaching a peak of number 14; marking the band's second most successful single behind "5 Years Time" - which peaked at number 9. The single also saw success in Ireland, where it reached a peak of number 30.
- "Tonight's the Kind of Night" was released on 16 May 2011 as the second single from their album.
- Opening track "Life Is Life" was released 8 August 2011. A video for the song had already been released earlier.
- "Waiting for My Chance to Come" was released on 12 September 2011, with an inspired video shot aboard a lightship in the Pool of London.

== Commercial performance ==
In 2011, Last Night on Earth sold 261,000 copies in the UK.

== Track listing ==
All songs by Charlie Fink.

Last Night on Earth track listing
No.	Title	Length
1.	"Life Is Life"	3:37
2.	"Tonight's the Kind of Night"	3:10
3.	"L.I.F.E.G.O.E.S.O.N."	3:52
4.	"Wild Thing"	4:50
5.	"Give It All Back"	2:56
6.	"Just Me Before We Met"	3:38
7.	"Paradise Stars"	1:30
8.	"Waiting for My Chance to Come"	2:57
9.	"The Line"	3:30
10.	"Old Joy"	3:29

== Personnel ==
Noah and the Whale

- Charlie Fink – vocals, guitar, art direction, design, production
- Tom Hobden – violin, keyboards
- Matt Owens – bass guitar
- Fred Abbott – guitar, keyboards
- Michael Petulla – drums

Artwork

- Tom Bird – art direction, photography
- Autumn de Wilde – photography
- Markus Karlsson – art direction, design, cover art
- Mat Maitland – art direction, design

Production

- Jason Lader – production, mixing engineer
- Russell Fawcus – assistant engineer
- Tom Elmhirst – mixing
- Mike Marsh – mastering engineer

== Charts ==
Chart performance for Last Night on Earth
Chart (2011)	Peak position
Australian Albums (ARIA)	86
Belgian Albums (Ultratop Flanders)	57
Dutch Albums (Album Top 100)	89
Irish Albums (IRMA)	17
UK Albums (Official Charts)	8
US Billboard 200	135
US Top Rock Albums (Billboard)	35
US Top Alternative Albums (Billboard)	20
US Heatseekers Albums (Billboard)	4

== Release history ==
Release history and formats for Last Night on Earth
Region	Date	Format	Label
United Kingdom	4 March 2011	Digital download	Mercury
United Kingdom	7 March 2011	CD	Mercury
United Kingdom	15 April 2011	Vinyl	Mercury
