= Monty Munford =

- Born: 4 June 1961 (age 65); Twickenham, England
- Occupation: Tech Journalist
- Known for: Technology

Monty Munford (born 4 June 1961) is an English-born tech journalist.

== Career ==
Munford worked for several years as a motorbike dispatch-rider in London, before retraining as a journalist at the London College of Printing in 1998. In the past 27 years, he has forged a career as a tech writer, an investment consultant who has helped companies raise money and exit for more than €1.6 billion and he has spoken on stage at more than 200 global events as a keynote speaker, emcee and moderator.

=== Writing ===
Munford, as of 2025, regularly writes for The Economist, CoinTelegraph and Tech.eu and contributes to many other Tier 1 publications. In 2023 he was featured as a journalist who also works as an entrepreneur and investment consultant by Forbes.

From 2015 to 2019 Munford was a tech columnist for Forbes in New York and The Telegraph in London. He has also contributed to TechCrunch, Mashable, Fast Company, The Huffington Post, Wired. MIT Technology Review, The Independent, The Inquirer, The Guardian, The Observer, Financial Times, and The Times of India.

He has interviewed on stage Kim Kardashian, Sir Tim Berners-Lee, Apple co-founder Steve Wozniak, John McAfee, and many other tech luminaires.

In August 2019, Munford reported on the BBC that he had been defrauded of £25,000 in cryptocurrency, mainly Bitcoin and Ethereum, when his private keys were stolen from his Gmail account.

Munford has also written and self-published The Dust Bowls of Maturity.

=== Business ===
In 2005 Munford joined mobile media games publisher and distributor Player X having previously worked for mobile game testing house Babel Media. Munford left Player X to devote his time to connecting UK and Indian mobile content providers working with in Paramount and FC Liverpool, as well as to pursue acting in Bollywood.

In 2011, he returned to the UK and set up his own consultancy. He works with companies to help them raise money, raise their profile, connect with the right network and eventually exit via acquisition. As of 2025, he had helped more than 45 companies raise money and exit to the value of €1.6 billion.

=== Acting ===
Munford has acted in two Bollywood films: as a 1930s British officer for the Ashutosh Gowariker film Khelein Hum Jee Jaan Sey,

and as a Russian gangster in the Rohan Sippy film Dum Maro Dum.[22]
