= Mobile business intelligence =

Business intelligence systems delivered via mobile device

Mobile Business Intelligence (Mobile BI or Mobile Intelligence) is a system comprising both technical and organizational elements that present historical and/or real-time information to its users for analysis on mobile devices such as smartphones and tablets (not laptops), to enable effective decision-making and management support, for the overall purpose of increasing firm performance. (Peters et al., 2016).

Business intelligence (BI) refers to computer-based techniques used in spotting, digging-out, and analyzing business data, such as sales revenue by products and/or departments or associated costs and incomes.

Although the concept of mobile computing has been prevalent for over a decade, Mobile BI has shown a momentum/growth only very recently. This change has been partly encouraged by a change from the ‘wired world’ to a wireless world with the advantage of smartphones which has led to a new era of mobile computing, especially in the field of BI.

According to the Aberdeen Group, a large number of companies are rapidly undertaking mobile BI owing to a large number of market pressures such as the need for higher efficiency in business processes, improvement in employee productivity (e.g., time spent looking for information), better and faster decision making, better customer service, and delivery of real-time bi-directional data access to make decisions anytime and anywhere. But despite the apparent advantages of mobile information delivery, mobile BI is still in the ‘early adopter’ phase. Some CFOs remain skeptical of the business benefits and with the perceived lack of specific business use cases and tangible ROI, mobile BI adoption is still behind the curve compared with other enterprise mobile applications.

== History ==
=== Information delivery to mobile devices ===
The predominant method for accessing BI information is using proprietary software or a Web browser on a personal computer to connect to BI applications. These BI applications request data from databases. Starting in the late 1990s, BI systems offered alternatives for receiving data, including email and mobile devices..

=== Static data push ===
Initially, mobile devices such as pagers and mobile phones received pushed data using a short message service (SMS) or text messages. These applications were designed for specific mobile devices, contained minimal amounts of information, and provided no data interactivity. As a result, the early mobile BI applications were expensive to design and maintain while providing limited informational value, and garnered little interest.

=== Data access via a mobile browser ===
The mobile browser on a smartphone, a handheld computer integrated with a mobile phone, provided a means to read simple tables of data. The small screen space, immature mobile browsers, and slow data transmission could not provide a satisfactory BI experience. Accessibility and bandwidth may be perceived as issues when it comes to mobile technology, but BI solutions provide advanced functionality to predict and outperform such potential challenges. While Web-based mobile BI solutions provide little to no control over the processing of data in a network, managed BI solutions for mobile devices only utilize the server for specific operations. In addition, local reports are compressed both during transmission and on the device, permitting greater flexibility for storage and receipt of these reports. Within a mobile environment, users capitalize on easy access to information because the mobile application operates within a single authoring environment that permits access to all BI content (respecting existing security) regardless of language or locale. Furthermore, the user will not need to build and maintain a separate mobile BI deployment. In addition, mobile BI requires much less bandwidth for functionality. Mobile BI promises a small report footprint on memory, encryption during transmission as well as on the device, and compressed data storage for offline viewing and use.

=== Mobile client application ===
In 2002, Research in Motion released the first BlackBerry smartphone optimized for wireless email use. Wireless e-mail proved to be the “killer app” that accelerated the popularity of the smartphone market. By the mid-2000s, Research in Motion's BlackBerry had solidified its hold on the smartphone market with both corporate and governmental organizations. The BlackBerry smartphones eliminated the obstacles to mobile business intelligence. The BlackBerry offered a consistent treatment of data across its many models, provided a much larger screen for viewing data, and allowed user interactivity via the thumbwheel and keyboard. BI vendors re-entered the market with offerings spanning different mobile operating systems (BlackBerry, Windows, Symbian) and data access methods. The two most popular data access options were:

- to use the mobile browser to access data, similar to desktop computer, and
- to create a native application designed specifically for the mobile device.

Research in Motion is continuing to lose market share to Apple and Android smartphones. In the first three months of 2011 Google's Android OS gained 7 points of market share. During the same time period RIM's market share collapsed and dropped almost 5 points.

=== Purpose-built Mobile BI apps ===
Apple quickly set the standard for mobile devices with the introduction of the iPhone. In the first three years, Apple sold over 33.75 million units. Similarly, in 2010, Apple sold over 1 million iPads in just under three months. Both devices feature an interactive touchscreen display that is the de facto standard on many mobile phones and tablet computers.

In 2008, Apple published the SDK for which developers can build applications that run natively on the iPhone and iPad instead of Safari-based applications. These native applications can give the user a robust, easier-to-read and easier-to-navigate experience.

Others were quick to join in the success of mobile devices and app downloads. The Google Play Store now has over 700,000 apps available for the mobile devices running the Android operating system.

More importantly, the advent of the mobile device has radically changed the way people use data on their mobile devices. This includes mobile BI. Business intelligence applications can be used to transform reports and data into mobile dashboards, and have them instantly delivered to any mobile device.

Google Inc.’s Android has overtaken Apple Inc.’s iOS in the wildly growing arena of app downloads. In the second quarter of 2011, 44% of all apps downloaded from app marketplaces across the web were for Android devices while 31% were for Apple devices, according to new data from ABI Research. The remaining apps were for various other mobile operating systems, including BlackBerry and Windows Phone 7.

Mobile BI applications have evolved from being a client application for viewing data to a purpose-built application designed to provide information and workflows necessary to quickly make business decisions and take action.

=== Web Applications vs. Device-Specific Applications for Mobile BI ===
In early 2011, as the mobile BI software market started to mature and adoption started to grow at a significant pace in both small and large enterprises, most vendors adopted either a purpose-built, device-specific application strategy (e.g. iPhone or Android apps, downloaded from iTunes or the Google Play Store) or a web application strategy (browser-based, works on most devices without an application being installed on the device). This debate continues and there are benefits and drawbacks to both methods. One potential solution will be the wider adoption of HTML5 on mobile devices which will give web applications many of the characteristics of dedicated applications while still allowing them to work on many devices without an installed application.

Microsoft has announced their mobile BI strategy. Microsoft plans to support browser-based applications such as Reporting Services and PerformancePoint on iOS in the first half of 2012 and touch-based applications on iOS and Android by the second half of 2012. Despite popular perception that Microsoft only acknowledges its own existence, recent moves suggest the company is aware that it is not the only player in the technology ecosystem. Instead of attempting to squelch competition or suggesting new technology developments were ridiculous, the company has instead decided to make its technology accessible to a wider audience.

There are many mobile devices and platforms available today. The list is constantly growing and so is the platform support. There are hundreds of models available today, with multiple hardware and software combinations. The enterprise must select a device very carefully. The target devices will impact the mobile BI design itself because the design for a smartphone will be different than for a tablet. The screen size, processor, memory, etc. all vary. The mobile BI program must account for lack of device standardization from the providers by constantly testing devices for the mobile BI apps. Some best practices can always be followed. For example, a smartphone is a good candidate for operational mobile BI. However, for analytics and what-if analysis, tablets are the best option. Hence, the selection or availability of the device plays a big role in the implementation.

== Demand ==
Gartner analyst Ted Friedman believes that mobile delivery of BI is all about practical, tactical information needed to make immediate decisions – "The biggest value is in operational BI — information in the context of applications — not in pushing lots of data to somebody's phone."

Accessing the Internet through a mobile device such as a smartphone is also known as the mobile Internet or mobile Web. IDC expects the US mobile workforce to increase by 73% in 2011. Morgan Stanley reports the mobile Internet is ramping up faster than its predecessor, the desktop Internet, enabling companies to deliver knowledge to their mobile workforce to help them make more profitable decisions.

Michael Cooney from Gartner has identified bring-your-own-technology at work as becoming the norm, not the exception. By 2015 media tablet shipments will reach around 50% of laptop shipments and Windows 8 will likely be in third place behind Android and Apple. The net result is that Microsoft's share of the client platform, be it PC, tablet or smartphone, will likely be reduced to 60% and it could fall below 50%.

== Business Benefits ==
In its latest Magic Quadrant for Business Intelligence Platforms, Gartner examines whether the platform enables users to "fully interact with BI content delivered to mobile devices." The phrase "fully interact" is the key. The ability to send alerts embedded in email or text messages, or links to static content in email messages hardly represents sophistication in mobile analytics. For users to benefit from mobile BI, they must be able to navigate dashboard and guided analytics comfortably—or as comfortably as the mobile device will allow, which is where devices with high-resolution screens and touch interfaces (like the iPhone and Android-based phones) have a clear edge over, say, earlier editions of BlackBerry. It is equally important to take a step back to define your purpose and adoption patterns. Which business users can benefit the most from mobile analytics—and what, exactly, is their requirement? You don't need mobile analytics to send a few alerts or summary reports to their handhelds—without interactivity, mobile BI is indistinguishable from merely informative email or text messages.

== Applications ==
Similar to consumer applications, which have shown an ever-increasing growth over the past few years, a constant demand for anytime, anywhere access to BI is leading to a number of custom mobile application development. Businesses have also started adopting mobile solutions for their workforce and are soon becoming key components of core business processes. In an Aberdeen survey conducted in May 2010, 23% of companies participating indicated that they now have a mobile BI app or dashboard in place, while another 31% indicated that they plan to implement some form of mobile BI in the next year.

=== Definitions ===
Mobile BI applications can be defined/segregated as follows:

- Mobile Browser Rendered App: Almost any mobile device enables Web-based, thin client, HTML-only BI applications. However, these apps are static and provide little data interactivity. Data is viewed just as it would be over a browser from a personal computer. Little additional effort is required to display data but mobile browsers can typically only support a small subset of the interactivity of a web browser.
- Customized App: A step up from this approach is to render each (or all) reports and dashboards in device-specific format. In other words, provide information specific to the screen size, optimize usage of screen real estate, and enable device-specific navigation controls. Examples of these include thumb wheel or thumb button for BlackBerry, up/down/left/right arrows for Palm, gestural manipulation for iPhone. This approach requires more effort than the previous but no additional software.
- Mobile Client App: The most advanced, the client app provides full interactivity with the BI content viewed on the device. In addition, this approach provides periodic caching of data which can be viewed and analyzed even offline.

Companies across all verticals, from retail to even non-profit organizations are realizing the value of purpose-specific mobile applications suited for their mobile workforce.

== Development ==
Developing a native mobile BI app poses challenges, especially concerning data display rendering and user interactivity. Mobile BI App development has traditionally been a time-consuming and expensive effort requiring businesses to justify the investment for the mobile workforce. They do not only require texting and alerts, they need information customized for their line of work which they can interact with and analyze to gain deeper information.

=== Custom-coded Mobile BI Apps ===
Mobile BI applications are often custom-coded apps specific to the underlying mobile operating system. For example, the iPhone apps require coding in Objective-C while Android apps require coding in Java. In addition to the user functionality of the app, the app must be coded to work with the supporting server infrastructure required to serve data to the mobile BI app. While custom-coded apps offer near limitless options, the specialized software coding expertise and infrastructure can be expensive to develop, modify, and maintain.

=== Fixed-form Mobile BI Applications ===
Business data can be displayed in a mobile BI client (or web browser) that serves as a user interface to existing BI platforms or other data sources, eliminating the need for new master sources of data and specialized server infrastructure. This option offers fixed and configurable data visualizations such as charts, tables, trends, KPIs, and links, and can usually be deployed quickly using existing data sources. However, the data visualizations are not limitless and cannot always be extended to beyond what is available from the vendor.

=== Graphical Tool-developed Mobile BI Apps ===
Mobile BI apps can also be developed using the graphical, drag-and-drop development environments of BI platforms. The advantages including the following:

1. Apps can be developed without coding,
2. Apps can be easily modified and maintained using the BI platform change management tools,
3. Apps can use any range of data visualizations and not be limited to just a few,
4. Apps can incorporate specific business workflows, and
5. The BI platform provides the server infrastructure.

Using graphical BI development tools can allow faster mobile BI app development when a custom application is required.

== Security Considerations for Mobile BI Apps ==
High adoption rates and reliance on mobile devices makes safe mobile computing a critical concern. The Mobile Business Intelligence Market Study discovered that security is the number one issue (63%) for organizations.

A comprehensive mobile security solution must provide security at these levels:

- Device
- Transmission
- Authorization, Authentication, and Network security

=== Device Security ===
A senior analyst at the Burton Group research firm recommends that the best way to ensure data will not be tampered with is to not store it on the client device (mobile device). As such, there is no local copy to lose if the mobile device is stolen and the data can reside on servers within the data center with access permitted only over the network. Most smartphone manufacturers provide a complete set of security features including full-disk encryption, email encryption, as well as remote management which includes the ability to wipe contents if device is lost or stolen. Also, some devices have embedded third-party antivirus and firewall software such as RIM's BlackBerry.

=== Transmission Security ===
Transmission security refers to measures that are designed to protect data from unauthorized interception, traffic analysis, and imitative deception. These measures include Secure Sockets Layer (SSL), iSeries Access for Windows, and virtual private network (VPN) connections. A secure data transmission should enable the identity of the sender and receiver to be verified by using a cryptographic shared key system as well as protect the data to be modified by a third party when it crosses the network. This can be done using AES or Triple DES with an encrypted SSL tunnel.

=== Authorization, Authentication, and Network Security ===
Authorization refers to the act of specifying access rights to control access of information to users. Authentication refers to the act of establishing or confirming the user as true or authentic. Network security refers to all the provisions and policies adopted by the network administrator to prevent and monitor unauthorized access, misuse, modification, or denial of the computer network and network-accessible resources. The mobility adds to unique security challenges. As data is trafficked beyond the enterprise firewall towards unknown territories, ensuring that it is handled safely is of paramount importance. Towards this, proper authentication of user connections, centralized access control (like LDAP Directory), encrypted data transfer mechanisms can be implemented.

=== Role of BI for Securing Mobile Apps ===
To ensure high security standards, BI software platforms must extend the authentication options and policy controls to the mobile platform. Business intelligence software platforms need to ensure a secure encrypted keychain for storage of credentials. Administrative control of password policies should allow creation of security profiles for each user and seamless integration with centralized security directories to reduce administration and maintenance of users.

== See also ==
- Real-time business intelligence
- Media intelligence
- Data Mining
- Online analytical processing or OLAP
- Predictive analytics
- Dashboards (management information systems)
