= Heart of Nowhere =

Studio album by Noah and the Whale
- Released: 6 May 2013
- Recorded: 2012
- Studio: British Grove (Chiswick, London)
- Genre: Indie pop
- Length: 34:56
- Label: Mercury
- Producer: Noah and the Whale

Noah and the Whale chronology
Last Night on Earth (2011)	Heart of Nowhere (2013)

Singles from Heart of Nowhere
- 1. "There Will Come a Time" Released: 20 March 2013; 2. "Lifetime" Released: 28 June 2013

Heart of Nowhere is the fourth and final studio album by English folk rock band Noah and the Whale. The record was released on 6 May 2013 on Mercury Records. The album is paired with a half-hour short film of the same name.

== Background ==
The album was partially inspired by the touring schedule of Last Night on Earth, and vocalist/guitarist Charlie Fink finding a close friend engaged upon returning home. "I didn't know what was going on in my friends' lives because I'd been away for so long, and also because that seems like a defining moment in a group of people's lives," he remarked.

Prior to recording, the band spent two weeks writing in isolation on Osea Island in the Blackwater Estuary. Afterwards, the band trekked to La Fabrique in the south of France to continue writing, but less work was completed due to distractions. "They were knocking the place down, so we had one room while the building was coming down around us!" said vocalist/guitarist Charlie Fink. The band recorded the album at British Grove Studios in Chiswick, London over the course of two weeks. The band wanted to have confidence in each song and its ability to stand on its own, and purposefully recorded the record live. Lyrically, the album chronicles the end of adolescence and memories of friendship. The transition to adulthood – with marriage as one of the final tollbooths – is the central concept of the album. "One of the main themes, beyond nostalgia and the end of adolescence, is acceptance. It starts off with a first song that's a melodramatic story of a kid wanting to break away from his family, basically, to acceptance of your family and who you are and who you want to be as a man," said Fink.

Fink's original intention was to pair the record with a film, but was unable to develop a story until several tracks were written. Co-written with Charlotte Colbert, the Heart of Nowhere short film, which runs for a half-hour, continues the themes of the record. The film revolves around four friends on a teenagers-only island, separated from society. When the quartet learn they are to be taken away to the city to become adults, they must make their final night together meaningful.

== Critical reception ==
Professional ratings
Aggregate scores
Source	Rating
Metacritic	64/100
Review scores
Source	Rating
AllMusic	3.5/5 stars
The Guardian	4/5 stars
The Independent	3/5 stars
NME	3.5/5 stars
Pitchfork	5.0/10

Heart of Nowhere has received positive reviews from music critics. Charlotte Richardson Andrews of The Guardian wrote, "They aim for nostalgia and wind-in-hair buoyancy, and manage the balance sweetly throughout." Hazel Sheffield of NME called Heart of Nowhere a "record of rare precision; the kind that comes from figuring out exactly what you want." Uncut summarised, "Their fourth album continues in the vein of 2011's Last Night on Earth, divining its inspiration from cool, crisp '80s US new wave, "Every Breath You Take" bass lines, Brat Pack soundtracks and wistful songs about girls." Scott Kerr of AllMusic praised the record's sound quality: "The striking production -- namely the driving bass and tight drum sound -- that Arcade Fire mixer Craig Silvey has conjured up here has created a spacious sounding record that is packed with strings and synths and is for the most part -- rather impressively -- recorded live."

Conversely, Andy Gill of The Independent felt the record was too reliant on yesterday: "Three songs feature "time" in the title, which is at least two too many; and while it's pleasantly effected for the most part, it's hard to get involved in someone else's nostalgia."

== Track listing ==
All tracks are written by Charlie Fink.

Heart of Nowhere track listing
No.	Title	Length
1.	"Introduction"	1:35
2.	"Heart of Nowhere" (featuring Anna Calvi)	4:05
3.	"All Through the Night"	3:18
4.	"Lifetime"	3:54
5.	"Silver and Gold"	3:24
6.	"One More Night"	3:55
7.	"Still After All These Years"	3:27
8.	"There Will Come a Time"	3:37
9.	"Now Is Exactly the Time"	3:40
10.	"Not Too Late"	4:01
Total length:		34:56

== Personnel ==
Noah and the Whale

- Charlie Fink – vocals, guitar
- Tom Hobden – violin, keyboards
- Matt Owens – bass guitar
- Fred Abbott – guitar, keyboards
- Michael Petulla – drums

== Charts ==
Chart performance for Heart of Nowhere
Chart (2013)	Peak position
Australian Albums (ARIA)	62
Belgian Albums (Ultratop Flanders)	95
Irish Albums (IRMA)	18
Scottish Albums (OCC)	16
UK Albums (OCC)	13
US Heatseekers Albums (Billboard)	33

== Release history ==
Release history and formats for Heart of Nowhere
Region	Date	Format	Label
United Kingdom	6 May 2013	CD; vinyl; digital download	Mercury
