= 5 Years Time =

2007 single by Noah and the Whale

Single by Noah and the Whale

from the album Peaceful, the World Lays Me Down
- Released: 22 October 2007; 4 August 2008 (re-release)
- Genre: Anti-folk; indie pop
- Length: 4:02 (video edit)
- Label: Mercury
- Songwriter: Charlie Fink
- Producers: Eliot James; Noah and the Whale

Noah and the Whale singles chronology
"5 Years Time" (2007)	"2 Bodies 1 Heart" (2008)
"Shape of My Heart" (2008)	"5 Years Time" (2008)	"Shape of My Heart" (2008)

"5 Years Time", also known as "5 Years Time (Sun Sun Sun)", is the debut single by English folk rock band Noah and the Whale. Originally released on 22 October 2007 as the lead single from their debut album Peaceful, the World Lays Me Down, it became the band's first top 40 hit upon re-release on 4 August 2008.

== Chart performance ==
"5 Years Time" did not chart upon its first release in 2007. After poor initial sales, the group chose to re-release the single, and the record made it onto the charts in a number of countries. In the UK, it debuted at number 24, and went on to become Noah and the Whale's first top-ten single, peaking at number 7. In Ireland, "5 Years Time" debuted at number 47 and peaked at number 10. It is the band's highest-charting song in both countries.

== Music video ==
The music video was directed by James Copeman. It features the band performing in a pub and dancing/playing in the park. During the video, Laura Marling, who provides backing vocals for the group, is seen playing a tin whistle and also giving the camera the two-fingers. The style of the video resembles a Wes Anderson film, using the same font the director uses in his films/music videos. Noah and the Whale are known to be fans of Anderson's work, and they named their band after the film The Squid and the Whale (2005), on which Anderson was a producer, as well as its director Noah Baumbach, a long term collaborator of Anderson's.

== Charts ==
=== Weekly charts ===
Chart (2008)	Peak position
Austria (Ö3 Austria Top 40)	59
Belgium (Ultratop 50 Flanders)	72
Ireland (IRMA)	10
Scottish Singles Sales (Official Charts)	3
UK Singles (Official Charts)	7

=== Year-end charts ===
Chart (2008)	Position
UK Singles (OCC)	78

== Certifications ==
Region	Certification	Certified units/sales
United Kingdom (BPI)	Platinum	600,000^{‡}
^{‡} Sales+streaming figures based on certification alone.

== In popular culture ==
The song was used in a 2008 SunChips commercial, in a 2008 Saturn commercial and also featured in a Volkswagen Golf commercial in 2015. It was featured in an episode of the BBC One school drama series Waterloo Road in 2009, as well as an episode in series 3 of that same broadcaster's popular show Gavin & Stacey.

"5 Years Time" is featured in the 2025 DC Universe film Superman; it is played during an action sequence in which Mister Terrific (portrayed by Edi Gathegi) battles Lex Luthor's mercenaries while infiltrating their base to rescue Superman. The song's streaming numbers saw a 1,000% increase following its inclusion in the film, going from 7,300 streams to 85,400 streams by July 12, the day after Superman released.
