= Noah and the Whale =

English indie rock band

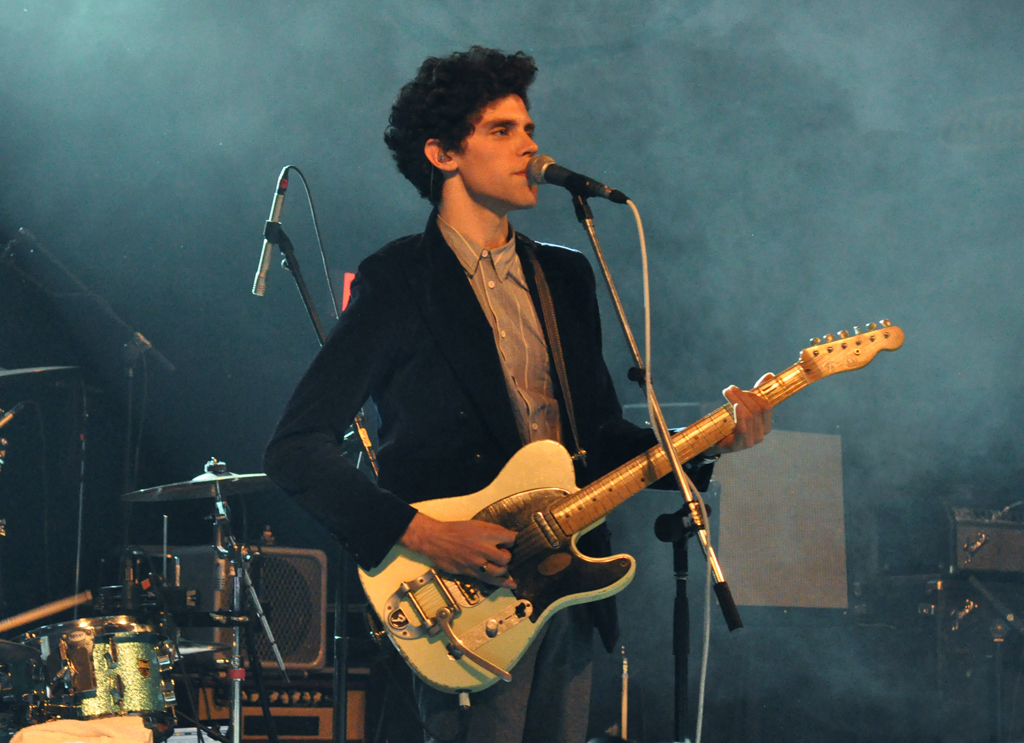
- Noah and the Whale performing at SXSW in Austin, Texas in 2011

Background information
- Origin: Twickenham, London, England
- Genres: Indie rock, folk
- Years active: 2006–2015
- Labels: Young & Lost Club, Cherrytree, Mercury
- Past members: Charlie Fink; Tom Hobden; Matt "Urby Whale" Owens; Fred Abbott; Michael Petulla; Doug Fink; Laura Marling
- Website: noahandthewhale.com (archived)

Noah and the Whale were an English indie rock and folk band from Twickenham, formed in 2006 and dissolved in 2015. The band's last line-up consisted of Charlie Fink (vocals, guitar), Tom Hobden (violin/keyboards), Matt "Urby Whale" Owens (bass guitar), Fred Abbott (guitar/keys) and Michael Petulla (drums). Doug Fink (drums), the brother of lead singer Charlie, and Laura Marling (backing vocals) were also past members of the band. Their name is a play on director Noah Baumbach's 2005 film The Squid and the Whale.

The band have played at a number of notable venues, including a show at The Royal Albert Hall and festivals such as Coachella, Lollapalooza, Green Man and Glastonbury as well as headlining Wilderness Festival in 2013. They also toured with Arcade Fire, Vampire Weekend and Phoenix, and played on shows such as Late Show with David Letterman as well as Later... with Jools Holland, The Graham Norton Show and The Andrew Marr Show.

Their song "5 Years Time" is featured in the 2025 DC Universe film Superman. The song's daily streaming numbers saw a 1,000% increase following its inclusion in the film, going from 7,300 streams to 85,400 streams by July 12, the day after Superman released.

== History ==
=== Early years and Peaceful, the World Lays Me Down (2006–2008) ===
The band released their debut album, entitled Peaceful, the World Lays Me Down, on 11 August 2008. The album peaked at Number 5 on the official UK Albums Chart and has received mostly positive reviews. The album featured a brass accompaniment, provided by Jon Carvell (trombone) and Sam Kinrade (trumpet). The band's original line-up also included Laura Marling, who featured as backing vocals on the first album and performed with the band as much as her touring schedule allowed. In mid-2008, Marling left the band several months after the album's release. However, she continued to collaborate with band member Tom Hobden, who played fiddle on her albums I Speak Because I Can and Short Movie.

After the departure of Marling, Emmy the Great sang with the band for a short period of time, as well as Lillie Flynn (sister of singer Johnny Flynn) and Rebecca Lucy Taylor of Slow Club and Self Esteem filling the role of female vocalist during tours.

The band also released a 'punk' EP at the time called Noah and the Whale presents: The A Sides featuring new songs and a reworking of "Hold My Hand As I'm Lowered" from the band's debut album. Vinyl copies of the EP are still available on the Young And Lost Club website.

=== The First Days of Spring (2009) ===
From January 2009 onwards, the band started work on their second full-length LP, entitled The First Days of Spring. Along with the album release, Charlie Fink wrote and directed a film that runs the entire length of the album, also entitled The First Days of Spring. Fink decided not to feature female backing vocals on their second LP due to the painful but inspiring departure of Laura Marling to pursue a solo career. Her separation from the band did however inspire a change from their traditional sound, signaling a new direction in the band's music and lyrics. The album was released on 31 August 2009, a little over a year after their debut. Three days prior to the release Doug Fink, brother of lead singer Charlie, announced he would be leaving the band to pursue a career in medicine. At the same time Fred Abbott joined the band on second guitar/piano and Doug was temporarily replaced by former Pull Tiger Tail drummer Jack Hamson.

"The First Days of Spring" was the first single release from the album and was made available for download from the band's website, while the first official single entitled "Blue Skies" was released on 24 August 2009 after the song received its first airplay on Zane Lowe's Radio 1 evening show earlier in the summer. The band then embarked on an extensive tour which included playing at the 2009 Reading and Leeds Festivals on the main stage, as well as a variety of other venues.

On 30 September 2009, BBC News reported that the band's equipment, including guitars, bass instruments and their drum kit, were stolen from a car park near the Club Academy in Manchester, England. The theft occurred on the night of 29 September 2009. The equipment was recovered in late December 2009.

Their song "Give a Little Love" was used in an episode of Cougar Town titled "Here Comes My Girl" which first aired on 25 November 2009. The single "Blue Skies" was used in an episode of One Tree Hill titled "Some Roads Lead Nowhere" which first aired on 7 December 2009. The song was also used in an advertisement for the film The Descendants.

The First Days of Spring has been met with very positive reviews, showing more critical acclaim than their previous release. 'NME called the album "immense" and gave it a strong 9/10, whilst The Times awarded the album a full five stars. Towards the end of 2009 The Guardian newspaper put it at number 7 in their top albums of 2009. The Times newspaper put the album at number 9, and was also in Amazon's top albums of 2009.

=== Last Night on Earth (2010–2012) ===
In January 2010, it was announced that Noah and the Whale were heading to the recording studio soon to prepare their third album, for which the band was considering the title Old Joy, Demos for the new album were recorded at Bethnal Green Great Synagogue in London, featuring original drummer Doug Fink, but the band eventually recorded the album in Los Angeles, working with producer Jason Lader. Later, in an interview with the website SoonerMusic.com, lead singer Charlie announced that the album would be called Last Night on Earth. On 3 December 2010 the band released a track from the upcoming album on their official website, titled "Wild Thing". The first official single from the album, "L.I.F.E.G.O.E.S.O.N.", was released on 23 January 2011, peaking at number 14 in the UK Singles Chart. Last Night on Earth was released on 7 March 2011 through Mercury Records. During this period, Michael Petulla was introduced as the band's new drummer. Bassist Matt Owens and guitarist Fred Abbott auditioned upwards of 100 drummers, after placing an advertisement on Gumtree and eventually narrowed it down to 10, from which point the band rehearsed with each to see which was the best fit. Petulla, the last auditionee of the day, was picked.

Following the commercial success of Last Night on Earth, the band toured extensively, including three separate treks to the United States. "There was a week where we did Japan, Australia, Canada and Chicago in eight days. And I hate flying", remarked Fink.

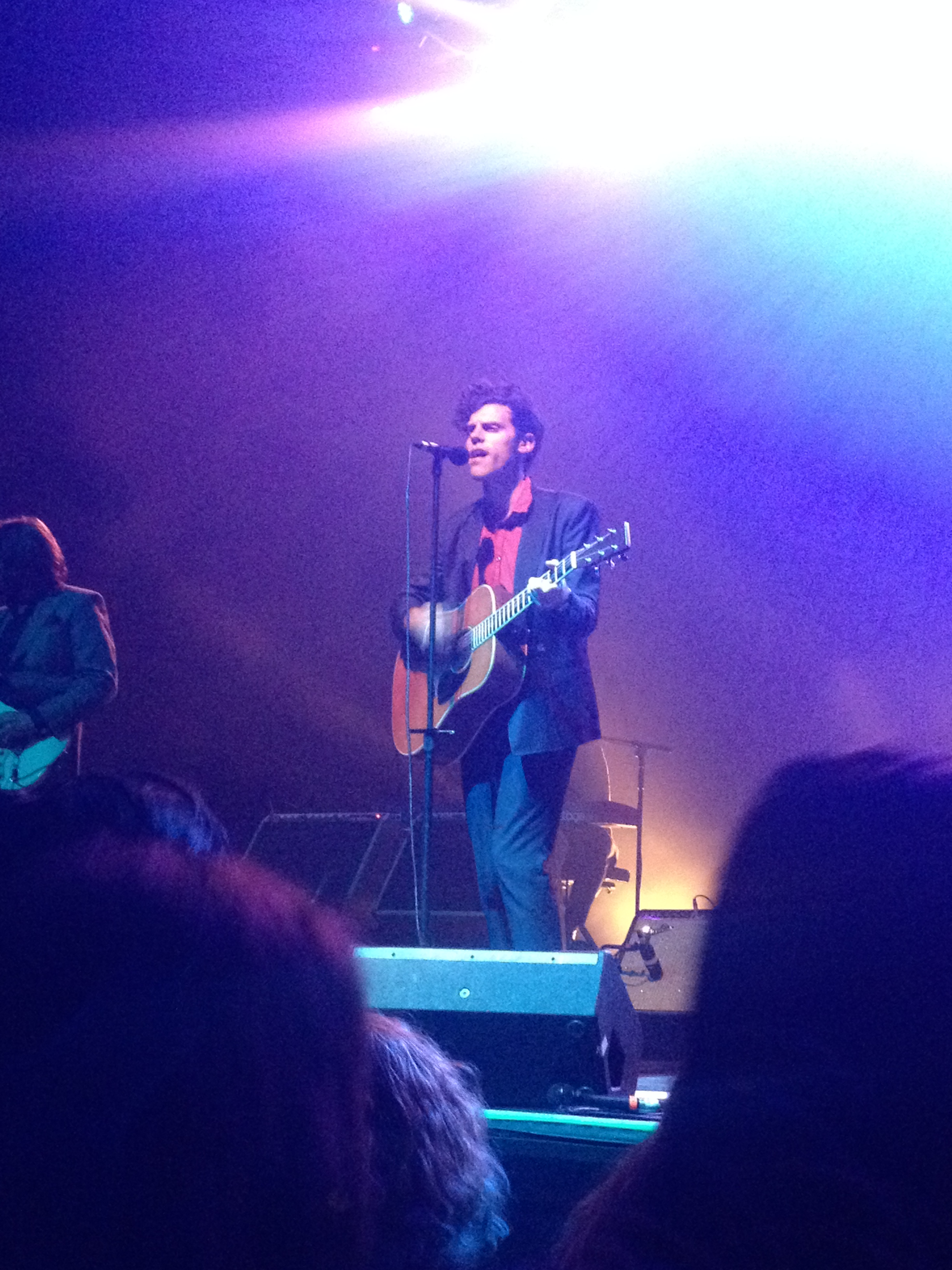
Noah and the Whale performing at the Boston House of Blues in October 2013

In 2011 the song "Waiting for My Chance to Come" was used in the series finale for the UK teen drama Skins.

The song "Give It All Back" was released on YouTube on 25 November 2011.

=== Heart of Nowhere (2013) ===
In January 2013, the band announced that they would be releasing a new album, entitled Heart of Nowhere on 6 May 2013, along with a four-show 'residency' at London's Palace Theatre (24 April 2013 and 5, 12 and 19 May 2013). A short film was also to accompany the new album, written and produced by lead singer Charlie Fink. On 21 March at 7:30 pm, the band aired "There Will Come a Time" on BBC Radio 1. Prior to the album's release, the band released images of several independent record stores where fans could find a tape of the new album. When all the tapes had been found, the band then made the album available for the public to listen to on their website. The album's second single, "Lifetime", was released in August 2013. The single was accompanied by a recording of the band performing Daft Punks's Digital Love and a music video created by Fourteen-Nineteen. After the album's release, the band embarked on the "Heart of Nowhere Tour" which included shows in Britain and North America, as well as headlining Wilderness Festival and supporting Vampire Weekend in their UK arena tour during November 2013. On 22 November 2013, the band announced a final date of the tour at the Islington Assembly hall on 10 December, a show which mainly consisted of requests from the audience, before taking some time out to work on new material. On 24 December 2013, they released a short film titled Heart of Nowhere as a "way of saying thank you for an amazing 2013".

=== Hiatus and split (2013–2015) ===
Following their shows at London's Islington Assembly Hall and Manchester's Deaf Institute in December 2013, the band embarked on a period of 'hiatus'. After nearly a year of radio silence, the band responded to fan appeals for updates by posting links to their personal social media accounts. In a tweet that has since been deleted, Fink confirmed on his personal Twitter that Noah and the Whale were still together in early 2015. However, on 1 April 2015, the band announced on social media that they were to split. After the split, Matt Owens announced a solo album, as did Fred Abbott, who also helped to form the new band Orphan Colours with former members of Ahab and Danny and the Champions of the World. Hobden began touring with Mumford & Sons as well as playing alongside both Abbott and Petulla as Matt Owens' backing band, "The Delusional Vanity Project" before joining Australian band Gang of Youths. Abbott released his debut solo album Serious Poke in July 2015, and has continued working with Hobden on a yearly Christmas project entitled "The Heathen and the Holy." In June 2015 Fink shared a new track titled "My Heartbeat Lost Its Rhythm", on SoundCloud. Fink also announced that he would be writing the music for the Old Vic theatre production of the Dr. Seuss classic The Lorax, and later released his debut studio album Cover My Tracks, in 2017, which was also accompanied by a stage show in which he performed.

With the aid of an online campaign for the release of the band's first two albums onto vinyl, which was started in 2014, the re-release of Peaceful, The World Lays Me Down and The First Days of Spring onto vinyl was announced for 18 May 2018.

== Band members ==
=== Final line-up ===
- Charlie Fink – lead vocals, guitar (2006–2015)
- Tom Hobden – violin, backing vocals, guitar, piano (2006–2015)
- Matt 'Urby Whale' Owens – bass guitar, backing vocals (2006–2015)
- Fred Abbott – guitar, backing vocals, piano (2009–2015)
- Michael Petulla – drums (2011–2015)

=== Former members ===
- John Hamson – drums (2009–2010)
- Doug Fink – drums (2006–2009)
- Laura Marling – backing vocals (2006–2008)
- Jon Carvell – trombone (2006–2008)
- Sam Kinrade – trumpet (2006–2008)

== Discography ==
- Peaceful, the World Lays Me Down (2008)
- The First Days of Spring (2009)
- Last Night on Earth (2011)
- Heart of Nowhere (2013)
