= Eraserfase =

American rapper

Eraserfase is an American Beat Music producer, singer, rapper and multi-instrumentalist from Los Angeles. He has released two albums on Alpha Pup Records' affiliate label, Dome of Doom. and has toured with Del the Funky Homosapien, 2Mex, Ceschi and Awol One.

== Career ==
He has been producing music since the age of 15, is currently active in Los Angeles' thriving beat scene as well as throughout the United States' Indie-Rap tour circuit. He is the nephew of Aram Gharabekian, the late conductor of The National Chamber Orchestra of Armenia. Prior to becoming active as a producer, he performed in various bands as a singer and percussionist. and also worked as an audio engineer, most notably with mixing and mastering credits on the debut album "Little Armenia" by Bei Ru.

=== Touring ===
Eraserfase has been touring throughout the United States since 2011. Notable performances include a 2013 tour with Del the Funky Homosapien, the SXSW festival in Austin, TX in 2014, three performances at Los Angeles' Low End Theory, and His most recent "Dropping Gems Tour" of 22 shows across the Southern United States, which included a show at Exploded Drawing's monthly pop-up in Austin, TX.

== Music ==
=== Albums ===
- "Obsoletism" - 2014 (Dome of Doom) Cited as a favorite of 2013 by Ryan Merchant of Capital Cities.
- "Analog Rituals" - 2015 (Dome of Doom)

=== Singles ===
- "Forks and Sockets" - 2016
- "I Know You (Sometimes)" - 2016
- "Kyanite" - 2016
- "Sapphire" - 2015
- Nocando - "Run 'em Back" (Produced by Eraserfase)
