= Jimmy the Lock =

Studio album by Nocando
- Released: January 26, 2010
- Studios: Los Angeles, California, U.S.
- Genre: Hip-hop
- Length: 40:53
- Label: Alpha Pup
- Producers: Nosaj Thing; Nobody; Thavius Beck; Nick Diamonds; Free the Robots; Maestroe; Daedelus

Nocando chronology
Jimmy the Lock (2010)	Jimmy the Burnout (2014)

Jimmy the Lock is the debut solo studio album by American rapper Nocando. It was released by Alpha Pup Records on January 26, 2010. It includes productions from Nosaj Thing, Nobody, Thavius Beck, Free the Robots, and Daedelus. The remix version of "Hurry Up and Wait" was premiered by Los Angeles Times in May 2010.

== Critical reception ==
Professional ratings
Review scores
Source	Rating
AltSounds	54/100
Cyclic Defrost	favorable
NPR	favorable
Potholes in My Blog	3/5 stars
Stereo Subversion	A−
URB	4.5/5 stars
XLR8R	8.5/10

Zoneil Maharaj of XLR8R gave the album an 8.5 out of 10, commenting that the album lives in both worlds of "the heralded cipher circle Project Blowed and beat-head bastion Low End Theory." Jeff Weiss of LA Weekly called it "one of the best and most forward-thinking L.A. hip-hop records in years." Andrew Noz of NPR wrote: "His lineage is of the legendary Project Blowed open mic, breeding ground for underground heroes such as Jurassic 5 and Freestyle Fellowship, and you can hear the double-time jazz-rap madness of the latter spilling over into his rigid cadences."

== Track listing ==
No.	Title	Producer(s)	Length
1.	"Head Static"	Nosaj Thing	3:43
2.	"Hurry Up and Wait"	Nobody	3:34
3.	"Two Track Mind" (featuring Busdriver)	Thavius Beck	4:33
4.	"You Got Some Nerve"	Nick Diamonds	2:36
5.	"21"	Nobody	3:25
6.	"DSD2" (featuring Open Mike Eagle)	Free the Robots	3:12
7.	"I'm On" (featuring Verbs)	Thavius Beck	3:27
8.	"Never Lie"	Maestroe	3:08
9.	"Exploits and Glitches"	Maestroe	2:30
10.	"Flight Risk"	Maestroe	4:28
11.	"Skankophelia"	Daedelus	2:35
12.	"Front Left Pocket"	Thavius Beck	3:40
Total length:			40:53

== Personnel ==
Credits adapted from liner notes.

- Nocando – vocals, executive production
- Busdriver – vocals (3)
- Open Mike Eagle – vocals (6)
- Verbs – vocals (7)
- The Gaslamp Killer – turntables (2)
- D-Styles – turntables (6)
- DJ Zo – turntables (12)
- Nosaj Thing – production (1)
- Nobody – production (2, 5)
- Thavius Beck – production (3, 7, 12)
- Nick Diamonds – production (4)
- Free the Robots – production (6)
- Maestroe – production (8, 9, 10)
- Daedelus – production (11)
- Daddy Kev – recording, mixing, mastering, executive production
- Reckluse – additional recording
- Bastard Artist – photography
- Sonny Kay – cover design
