= Terrain to Roam =

Studio album by Subtitle
- Released: October 10, 2006
- Genre: Hip hop
- Length: 45:09
- Label: Alpha Pup Records
- Producer: Madlib; Paris Zax; Nobody; Tes; Wrongz; Daddy Kev; Omid; Crunc Tesla; Daedelus; Thavius Beck; Small Is Beautiful; dDamage; Dntel

Subtitle chronology
Young Dangerous Heart (2005)	Terrain to Roam (2006)	Marks in Angles (2007)

Terrain to Roam is the second studio album by American rapper Subtitle. It was released on Alpha Pup Records on October 10, 2006.

== Critical reception ==
Professional ratings
Review scores
Source	Rating
AllMusic	4/5 stars
Alternative Press	2/5
XLR8R	favorable

Marisa Brown of AllMusic writes, "The album still has the general dark-hollow-drum feel of Young Dangerous Heart, but there's a playfulness heard here that was missing on his first release." She called it "a creative, interesting, and accessible album, an excellent piece of work from one of the underground's most exciting and unique artists." Meanwhile, Eddie Fleischer of Alternative Press gave the album a 2 out of 5, commenting that "It's hard to diss on a dude who's obviously putting his heart into his music, but unfortunately there just isn't enough here to really make a dent."

== Track listing ==
No.	Title	Producer(s)	Length
1.	"H.H. Jesus"	Madlib	1:22
2.	"Seventies Western Crime Scene, Pt. 1"	Paris Zax	2:18
3.	""S" Is for Summer"	Nobody	2:26
4.	"Pill Pop"	Tes	3:48
5.	"True Grit and More"	Wrongz	1:18
6.	"Restructure/Reroute" (featuring Thavius Beck)	Daddy Kev	3:50
7.	"Let's Get Lit"	Omid	1:42
8.	"Surrealist Life"	Crunc Tesla	4:19
9.	"Shields Up"	Daedelus	1:35
10.	"Seventies Western Crime Scene, Pt. 2"	Paris Zax	2:22
11.	"Write Is Wrong" (featuring Nocando)	Nobody	3:22
12.	"Wait for It"	Thavius Beck	2:55
13.	"Dance Invite #1"	Small Is Beautiful	3:31
14.	"About the Author"	dDamage	4:13
15.	"H.H. Lucifer"	Madlib	1:16
16.	"I Wonder If..."	Dntel	4:52
Total length:			45:09
