= Paris Zax =

- Origin: Los Angeles, California
- Genres: Instrumental hip hop
- Occupation: Producer
- Years active: 2000–present
- Labels: Alpha Pup Records

Paris Zax is an American underground hip hop producer based in Los Angeles, California. He has produced tracks for Busdriver, Blackbird and Shape Shifters, among others. He released the solo debut album, Unpath'd Waters, on Alpha Pup Records in 2005.

== Discography ==
=== Albums ===
- Unpath'd Waters (2005)

=== Productions ===
- Metfly - Wiggin' Out (2000)
- Shape Shifters - "Mos Eisley" from Planet of the Shapes (2000)
- 2Mex - "Making Money Off God" from B-Boys in Occupied Mexico (2001)
- Busdriver - "Imaginary Places", "Along Came a Biter", "Gun Control", "Opposable Thumbs", "Unplanned Parenthood" and "Post Apocalyptic Rap Blues" from Temporary Forever (2002)
- Metfly - "Truthfullness" from The Legacy (2003)
- Existereo - "Moments of Momentum", "Fire Side Chatz" and "Demigod" from Dirty Deeds & Dead Flowers (2003)
- Neila - "Land of Look Behind" from For Whom the Bells Crow (2004)
- Blackbird - Bird's Eye View (2005)
- Busdriver - "Unemployed Black Astronaut", "Avantcore", "Map Your Psyche", "Note Boom" and "Sphinx's Coonery" from Fear of a Black Tangent (2005)
- Subtitle - "Seventies Western Crime Scene Pt. 1" and "Seventies Western Crime Scene Pt. 2" from Terrain to Roam (2006)
- Acid Reign - "You and Me", "Heart of the City", "Not Like You", "Fantasy World", "Come Inside" and "The Reigners" from Time & Change (2006)
- Blackbird - Three Bird (2009)
