= Bomb Zombies =

Hip hop duo

- Origin: Los Angeles, California
- Genres: Alternative hip hop
- Years active: 2009–present
- Labels: Hellfyre Club
- Members: Nobody; Nocando

Bomb Zombies is an American alternative hip hop duo based in Los Angeles, California. It consists of producer Nobody and rapper Nocando, who were both resident musicians of Low End Theory.

== History ==
According to Blake Gillespie of Impose Magazine, Bomb Zombies formed in November 2009 in Japan after "DJ Nobody claimed he could produce radio rap as well as any Swizz Beatz, Scott Storch or Lil' Jon in the game" and "Nocando accepted the challenge with claims he could freestyle songs better than the rap dudes that have these hits ghost-written for them." The duo released the debut EP, Sincerely Yours, on Hellfyre Club in November 2010. It has received generally positive reviews from critics such as MTV Iggy, Okayplayer, and Potholes in My Blog.

== Style and influences ==
Terence Teh of Dazed Digital described the duo's style as "a slightly more salacious sonic invasion". Jeff Weiss of Los Angeles Times said: "Stripping the intelligent out of the so-called Intelligent Dance Music subgenre of the late '90s, the pair bridge the gap between the contemporary L.A. underground and classic Miami bass -- two scenes mutually bonded by their love of heavy low end."

== Discography ==
EPs

- Sincerely Yours (2010)
