= Avantcore =

Single by Busdriver

from the album Fear of a Black Tangent
- Released: January 18, 2005
- Genre: Alternative hip hop
- Length: 2:40
- Label: Mush Records
- Songwriter(s): Busdriver
- Producer(s): Paris Zax, Thavius Beck

Busdriver singles chronology
"'Imaginary Places'" (2002)	"Avantcore" (2005)	"'Kill Your Employer'" (2006)

Avantcore is a single by underground hip hop artist Busdriver from his album Fear of a Black Tangent. It was released on Mush Records in 2005. The title track "Avantcore" includes a sample of the song "Turtles Have Short Legs" by Can.

== Track listing ==
1. "Avantcore" - 2:26
  - Produced by Paris Zax
2. "Happiness('s Unit of Measurement)" - 4:40
  - Produced by Thavius Beck
3. "Unemployed Black Astronaut" – 4:02
  - Produced by Paris Zax
4. "Avantcore" – 2:35
  - D-Styles remix
5. "Happiness('s Unit of Measurement)" – 4:18
  - Prefuse 73 remix
6. "Unemployed Black Astronaut" – 4:39
  - Nobody remix
