= Monolith (Omid album) =

Studio album by Omid
- Released: September 16, 2003
- Genre: Hip-hop
- Length: 60:05
- Label: Mush Records
- Producer: Omid

Omid chronology
Distant Drummer (2002)	Monolith (2003)	Afterwords 3 (2007)

Monolith is a studio album by American hip-hop producer Omid. It was released by Mush Records on September 16, 2003.

== Critical reception ==
Professional ratings
Review scores
Source	Rating
Exclaim!	mixed
HipHopDX	8/10
Pitchfork	6.2/10
PopMatters	mixed
The Portland Mercury	4/4 stars
SF Weekly	favorable

Thomas Quinlan of Exclaim! wrote: "Although none of the songs on this album are bad, the rigid pattern of instrumental track then vocal track and back again becomes monotonous and breaks up the flow of the two separate entities, especially since the length of the instrumentals prevent them from being simply interludes." Meanwhile, Anna Klafter of SF Weekly wrote: "This combination of instrumentals and guest rappers creates the perfect sonic balance." Rollie Pemberton of Pitchfork gave the album a 6.2 out of 10, saying: "If Omid can manage to master a single style, instead of haphazardly attempting several approaches, he might yet carve his niche in the turbulent underground."

The album was ranked at number 35 on CMJ's "Hip-Hop 2003" chart.

== Track listing ==
No.	Title	Length
1.	"Arrival/Departure"	3:57
2.	"Robert L. Ripley" (featuring Hymnal)	5:06
3.	"Up"	2:55
4.	"Live from Tokyo" (featuring Luckyiam.PSC, Slug, Aceyalone, Murs, and DJ Drez)	6:42
5.	"Sound of the Sitar"	3:27
6.	"Double Header" (featuring Buck 65)	4:45
7.	"Research"	3:09
8.	"Myth Behind the Man" (featuring Abstract Rude and 2Mex)	4:12
9.	"Speakers Hot"	3:09
10.	"I'm Just a Bill" (featuring Spoon (of Iodine))	3:26
11.	"Ripple Study"	3:44
12.	"Shock and Awe" (featuring Busdriver)	3:30
13.	"Always Being Born"	5:37
14.	"Club Apotheosis" (featuring Hymnal)	6:26

== Personnel ==
Credits adapted from liner notes.

- Omid Walizadeh – percussion (13), production, mixing
- Hymnal – vocals (2, 14)
- Nobody – co-production (2)
- Luckyiam.PSC – vocals (4)
- Slug – vocals (4)
- Aceyalone – vocals (4)
- Murs – vocals (4)
- DJ Drez – turntables (4)
- Higo – mixing (4)
- Buck 65 – vocals (6)
- DJ Tetris – turntables (6, 8)
- Abstract Rude – vocals (8)
- 2Mex – vocals (8)
- Charmion Callon – flute (8)
- Chris Schlarb – guitar (9)
- Spoon (of Iodine) – vocals (10), co-production (10), human beatbox (10)
- Ceez – mixing (10)
- Busdriver – vocals (12)
- K. Umbra Minor – percussion (13)
- Leila – cello (14)
- David Cooley – mastering
