= Dialogue (Thavius Beck album) =

Studio album by Thavius Beck
- Released: October 12, 2009
- Genre: Hip hop
- Length: 39:27
- Label: Big Dada; Mush Records
- Producer: Thavius Beck; Debmaster; Giovanni Marks

Thavius Beck chronology
Thru (2006)	Dialogue (2009)	The Most Beautiful Ugly (2012)

Singles from Dialogue
- 1. "Go! / Away" Released: October 26, 2009

Dialogue is the third solo studio album by American hip hop musician Thavius Beck. It was released through Big Dada in Europe on October 12, 2009, and through Mush Records in the rest of the world on January 26, 2010. "Go! / Away" was released as a single from the album.

== Critical reception ==
Professional ratings
Review scores
Source	Rating
BBC	favorable
Contactmusic.com	favorable
PopMatters	6/10 stars
The Skinny	4/5 stars

Timothy Gabriele of PopMatters gave the album 6 stars out of 10, stating that "Beck's lyrics are presented in rapid-fire succession with a fairly straightforward style and delivery, like a laser-tongued Del the Funky Homosapien." Bram Gieben of The Skinny gave the album 4 stars out of 5, saying: "Smashing boundaries within electronic music and hip-hop simultaneously, it's hard to be anything but awed by this album, though it's likely to scare less adventurous hip-hop heads and dance music fans." Greg Cochrane of BBC described it as "[an] album packed with tightly-wound, chunky snares sounds, low chanting vocals and Beck's impressively deep flow drawn over the top like a darkening tarpaulin." Chris Ziegler of OC Weekly commented that "Beck combines the overcranked aesthetic of the Bomb Squad with the intensity of a band like Suicide, and you can hear the pixels crack and squelch between gunshots and sirens and Beck's fearless lyrics about the personal and political."

== Track listing ==
No.	Title	Producer(s)	Length
1.	"Intro/Cracking the Shell"	Thavius Beck	1:41
2.	"Away"	Thavius Beck	2:20
3.	"Go!"	Thavius Beck	2:24
4.	"Money"	Thavius Beck	2:31
5.	"Violence"	Thavius Beck	2:26
6.	"Burn"	Thavius Beck; Debmaster	2:54
7.	"And the Beat Goes On"	Thavius Beck	2:39
8.	"Painful"	Thavius Beck	2:40
9.	"Hardcore"	Thavius Beck	2:38
10.	"IDC"	Thavius Beck	2:07
11.	"Sheepish"	Thavius Beck; Giovanni Marks	2:32
12.	"Transmission"	Thavius Beck	2:17
13.	"Sometimes"	Thavius Beck	3:35
14.	"Pressure"	Thavius Beck	3:07
15.	"4 Part 2"	Thavius Beck	3:39
Total length:			39:27

== Personnel ==
Credits adapted from liner notes.

- Thavius Beck – vocals, production
- D-Styles – turntables (3)
- Daddy Kev – additional drum programming (5, 10, 12)
- Debmaster – production (6)
- Giovanni Marks – production (11)
- Omar Ghaznavi – guitar (12)
- Sonny Kay – layout, design
- Angela Gomez – photography
