= Dome of Doom Records =

Dome of Doom
- Founded: 2011
- Founder: Wylie Cable
- Distributors: Alpha Pup; Fat Beats
- Genre: Electronic; hip hop; experimental
- Country of origin: U.S.
- Location: Los Angeles, California
- Official website: www.domeofdoom.org

Dome of Doom Records is a Los Angeles-based independent record label founded in 2011 by musician and record producer Wylie Cable. The label specializes in boutique physical media artifacts, producing and distributing vinyl, CD and cassette for artists globally. Dome of Doom originally began releasing music on cassette, Soundcloud, and Bandcamp in 2011, and began distributing music digitally via a partnership with Alpha Pup in 2015.

== Distribution ==
Dome of Doom distributes its music catalogue digitally via Symphonic, and has licensed music from the catalogue to HBO, Netflix, Hulu, Nike, Adidas, Volcom, HUF Skateboards, Oakley and more via partnerships with independent Los Angeles based licensing firms like Wav-Pool and Nowagain as well as London based independent sync agency Made By Ikigai. Dome of Doom Records also has a world-wide physical distribution partnership with Fat Beats and has vinyl, cassette and CD editions of the labels releases available in local record stores in several countries.

Dome of Doom Records has released music by artists including Daedelus, Marcel Rodriguez (The Mars Volta), Huxley Anne, Linaforina, Kenny Segal, QRTR, Bleep Bloop, DMVU, Holly, Jon Casey, Gothic Tropic, Dabow, and DJ Ride.

== History ==
In 2011, Dome of Doom Records was founded by Wylie Cable. Within the same year, he also released his debut solo album "Water Under The Bridge", under the newly founded label. Dome of Doom Records partnered with Alpha Pup for worldwide digital distribution beginning in 2015.

In 2015, they began to work more closely with Low End Theory resident and co-founder DJ Nobody. Together, they released a reissue of DJ Nobody's first album "Puzzles" from 1996, with a B-Side of unreleased beats from that same era. The Label went on to release more tapes for Nobody over the coming years, such as "Prodigal Son".

YUNG by Linafornia was released on January 22, 2016. Linafornia captured the LA Beat Scene's signature sound.

The Dome of Doom has received coverage from media outlets including The Wire, XLR8R, Mixmag, and Dancing Astronaut. The Bandcamp Daily column editor for the "Best Beat Tapes" said in 2021: "The label connects the beat scene that orbited peak Low End Theory and the beat scene that persists in the void left by Low End Theory's dissolution...their roster is unimpeachable and always ahead of the curve."

In 2021, the 10 year anniversary of the label, the Decade of Doom compilation was released digitally and on a double LP vinyl.

== Artists ==
- 100 Onces
- Ahee
- The Arthur Cable Blues Band
- Bacteria Earth
- The Blank Tapes
- BOSTN
- Daedelus
- DJ Nobody
- DMVU
- Dream Panther
- Duk
- The DeathMedicine Band
- Elusive
- Eureka The Butcher
- Eraserfase
- ELOS
- Fractalline
- Gnome Beats
- Huxley Anne
- Insects vs Robots
- Kenny Segal
- Linafornia
- LMNOP
- Los
- MC Nocando
- The Opaque
- Particle Kid
- Phedee
- Rah Zen
- Space Gang
- Speakz
- Speakpanther
- Stevie Schmidt
- Suntundra Moon
- Swisha
- Wylie Cable
