= Tree Colored See =

Studio album by Nobody and Mystic Chords of Memory
- Released: April 25, 2006
- Recorded: June 2004 – June 2005
- Studio: Trout Gulch Studios, Santa Cruz, California, U.S.; Umatilla Studios, Long Beach, California, U.S.; Hydroponica, Watsonville, California, U.S.; The Steam Bucket, Long Beach, California, U.S.
- Genre: Indie rock
- Length: 39:17
- Label: Mush Records
- Producer: Nobody

Singles from Tree Colored See
- 1. "Broaden a New Sound" Released: May 30, 2006

Nobody chronology
And Everything Else... (2005)	Tree Colored See (2006)	Western Water Music Volume II (2008)

Mystic Chords of Memory chronology
Mystic Chords of Memory (2004)	Tree Colored See (2006)

Tree Colored See is a collaborative studio album by Nobody and Mystic Chords of Memory. It was released on Mush Records in 2006. "Broaden a New Sound" was released as a single from the album.

== Critical reception ==
Professional ratings
Review scores
Source	Rating
AllMusic	3.5/5 stars
Miami New Times	favorable
PopMatters	6/10 stars
Tiny Mix Tapes	4/5 stars
XLR8R	favorable

Jennifer Kelly of PopMatters gave the album 6 stars out of 10, commenting that "while Tree Colored See is not a radical departure from the Mystic Chords' self-titled first album, it is a somewhat more rhythmic and complex affair." Rick Anderson of AllMusic gave the album 3.5 stars out of 5, writing, "Those familiar with their work as separate entities won't be too surprised by the way they sound as a trio: imagine vague but attractive melodies sung in a gauzy, slightly adenoidal 1960s male whine (multi-tracked for maximum retro-psychedelic effect) and underpinned by weird but highly effective loops and rhythm samples." He added, "The album ends with more of a whimper than a bang, but up until then everything is just interesting enough to keep you consistently intrigued."

== Track listing ==
No.	Title	Length
1.	"The Seed"	3:52
2.	"Decisions, Decisions"	3:05
3.	"Broaden a New Sound"	4:09
4.	"Coyote's Song (When You Hear It Too)"	2:54
5.	"Memory"	5:19
6.	"Klaw Prints"	0:44
7.	"Walk in the After Light"	3:09
8.	"When the End Meets the Beginning"	2:36
9.	"Feet Upon the Sand"	4:44
10.	"Softer Sail"	3:37
11.	"Floating"	5:09
Total length:		39:17

Limited edition bonus tracks
No.	Title	Length
12.	"La Semilla (The Seed)" (Devendra Banhart Remix)	2:53
13.	"Coyote's Song (When You Hear It Too)" (The Long Lost Remix)	2:17
14.	"Feet Upon the Sand" (Dntel Remix)	4:34
15.	"Untitled Demo"	4:33
Total length:		53:36

== Personnel ==
Credits adapted from liner notes.

- Nobody – music, mixing, mastering
- Mystic Chords of Memory – music
- Omid Walizadeh – additional percussion (1)
- Derf Reklaw – flute (2, 9)
- Christopher Berens – vibraphone (10)
- Isaiah "Ikey" Owens – additional keyboards (10)
- Farmer Dave Scher – additional keyboards (11), slide guitar (11)
- Dave Cooley – mixing, mastering
- Soap Design Co. – cover art, layout design
- Kutmah – illustration
