= Tes (rapper) =

American rapper

- Also known as: Tes Uno
- Born: Terrence Tessora
- Origin: Brooklyn, New York, United States
- Genres: Hip hop
- Occupations: Rapper, producer
- Years active: 2000–present
- Label: Lex Records

Terrence Tessora, better known by his stage name Tes, is an American rapper from Brooklyn, New York.

In 2003, Tes released his debut album, X2. It was described by Exclaim! as "experimental New York hip-hop in the vein of Cannibal Ox, Aesop Rock and Company Flow."

== Discography ==
=== Studio albums ===
- X2 (2003)
- Go Blonde (2015)

=== Mixtapes ===
- A Trbie Called Tes (2011)

=== EPs ===
- Take Home Tes (2000)
- Sound Investments (2001)
- Pro Tes (2005)

=== Singles ===
- "New New York" (2003)

=== Guest appearances ===
- Funkstörung - "Chopping Heads" and "Fat Camp Feva" from Disconnected (2004)
- Para One - "Beat Down" from Epiphanie (2006)
- Krazy Baldhead - "2nd Movement Part 2" from The B-Suite (2009)

=== Productions ===
- Subtitle - "Pill Pop" from Terrain to Roam (2006)
