= Mestizo (rapper) =

American rapper

- Born: March 6, 1981 (age 45); San Jose, California, U.S.
- Origin: Los Angeles, California, U.S.
- Genre: Hip-hop
- Occupations: Rapper; producer
- Years active: 2003–present
- Labels: Galapagos4; Machina Muerte; Alpha Pup Records; Fake Four Inc.
- Website: mestizo.bandcamp.com

Mestizo (born March 6, 1981) is an American rapper from Los Angeles, California. He is a co-founder of Machina Muerte. He resides in Philadelphia, Pennsylvania.

== Career ==
In 2004, Mestizo released his solo debut album, Life Like Movie, on Galapagos4. In 2005, he released a collaborative album with Mike Gao, titled Blindfaith, on the label.

In 2007, he released an album, Dream State. It featured contributions from Julian Code, Murs, Qwel, and 2Mex. He released two more solo albums, Elecholo in 2010 and De'Nir in 2012.

He was featured on K-the-I???'s "Man or Machine" off of Yesterday, Today & Tomorrow (2008) and Sole and the Skyrider Band's "Vaya Con El Diablo" off of Hello Cruel World (2011).

In 2014, Mestizo released a six-track EP, Underlord. In 2015, he released a collaborative EP with Isaiah Toothtaker, titled Everybody's Enemy.

Mestizo and Doseone have formed a group called A7pha. The duo released the self-titled debut album, A7pha, on Anticon in 2017.

He released a collaborative EP with The Heavy Twelves, titled Big Bad Death, on Fake Four Inc. in 2018.

== Discography ==
=== Studio albums ===
- Life Like Movie (2004)
- Blindfaith (2005) (with Mike Gao)
- Dream State (2007)
- Elecholo (2010)
- Humansuit (2012) (with Isaiah Toothtaker)
- De'Nir (2012)
- Slocaine (2012) (with Uome)
- A7pha (2017) (with Doseone, as A7pha)
- Couch (2020) (with Controller 7)
- A7pha II (2022) (with Doseone, as A7pha)

=== EPs ===
- Black Square EP (2007)
- De'Nir EP (2012)
- Underlord (2014)
- Everybody's Enemy (2015) (with Isaiah Toothtaker)
- Big Bad Death (2018) (with The Heavy Twelves)
- Barbeque Part 1 (2019) (with Meaty Ogre)
- Golden (2019)

=== Singles ===
- "Baby Steps" (2004)

=== Guest appearances ===
- Meaty Ogre - "Mutable End" from Leo vs. Pisces (2003)
- Qwel & Maker - "The Network" from The Harvest (2004)
- Offwhyte - "Rival Ritual" from Bow to the Sceptor (2004)
- Qwel & Jackson Jones - "Fallout" from Dark Day (2005)
- Denizen Kane - "Killa Killa" from Tree City Legends Vol. II: My Bootleg Life (2005)
- 2Mex & Life Rexall - "Money in the Form of a Woman" from Money Symbol Martyrs (2006)
- Joe Dub - "LA2theBay" from Pooretry (2007)
- Robust - "Strictly Underground" from El Foto Grande (2007)
- Offwhyte - "Solid State" from Mainstay (2007)
- K-the-I??? - "Man or Machine" from Yesterday, Today & Tomorrow (2008)
- Isaiah Toothtaker - "What's Really Good?" from Murs 3:16 Presents (2008)
- Ex Patriots - "30 Pieces of Silver" from Islands & Kingdoms (2010)
- Isaiah Toothtaker - "I Gotcha" from Yiggy (2010)
- Kap Kallous - "Forget Me Not" from The She EP (2011)
- Rapewolf - "Stupid Posse Cut" from Stupidfaggotassundergroundrapsthatsuck (2011)
- Gel Roc - "Tragic Poetry" from Beautiful Tragedy (2011)
- Isaiah Toothtaker - "Self Control" from Illuminati Thug Mafia (2011)
- Cadalack Ron - "Closed Doors" from Space Cadalack (2011)
- Sole and the Skyrider Band - "Vaya Con El Diablo" from Hello Cruel World (2011)
- Shower BRB - "32Zoom" from Shower BRB (2012)
- Cadalack Ron + Briefcase - "Dead Horse" from Times Is Hard (2012)
- Isaiah Toothtaker - "Remix" from Illmatic 2 (2013)
- Sole - "The Trap" from No Wising Up No Settling Down (2013)
- Cyesm - "Turnt" from Disciple (2013)
- Tachyon Ghetto Blaster - "Steez" from TGB EP01 (2014)
- Tachyon Ghetto Blaster - "Steez" from Heaven on Earth (2016)
- Cyesm - "Lady Liberty" from Romance for Misfits (2016)
- Factor Chandelier - "Lord Taketh" from First Storm (2020)
