= Sincerely Yours (Bomb Zombies EP) =

EP by Bomb Zombies
- Released: November 9, 2010
- Genre: Alternative hip hop
- Length: 31:10
- Label: Hellfyre Club
- Producer: Nobody

Professional ratings
Review scores
Source	Rating
MTV Iggy	favorable
Okayplayer	favorable
Potholes in My Blog	3.5/5 stars

Sincerely Yours is the debut EP by American alternative hip hop duo Bomb Zombies, which consists of producer Nobody and rapper Nocando. It was released on Hellfyre Club in 2010.

Jeff Weiss of Los Angeles Times called it "a funhouse with a stripper pole installed, pregnant with minimal Roland 808 handclaps, Auto-Tune and enough bass to melt ice."

== Track listing ==
No.	Title	Length
1.	"Fuckwhatchaheard"	3:23
2.	"Payola"	2:52
3.	"Sincerely Yours"	3:04
4.	"Lock the Balcony"	3:13
5.	"Over the Edge"	3:34
6.	"Get 'Em"	2:54
7.	"Ratinacage"	3:36
8.	"Wednesday"	5:22
