= D-Styles =

Filipino record producer

- Born: Dave Cuasito; July 6, 1972 (age 54); Philippines
- Origin: California, U.S.
- Genre: Hip hop; Turntablism
- Occupations: Producer; DJ
- Instrument: Turntable
- Years active: 1992–present
- Labels: Beat Junkie Sound; Bully Records; Funkshitup Records, Dirtstyle Records

Dave Cuasito better known by his stage name D-Styles, is a hip hop producer and DJ. He has been a member of Invisibl Skratch Piklz, Beat Junkies, and Third Sight. He has also been a resident DJ of Low End Theory. D-styles is an instructor at the Beat Junkies Institute of Sound.

In 2002, D-Styles released his solo studio album, Phantazmagorea, on Beat Junkie Sound. It was described by Fact as, "The perfect evolution of hip hop's sample addiction: an album made entirely of samples manipulated by the human hand and overseen by a human brain."

== Discography ==
=== Studio albums ===
- Phantazmagorea (2002)
- The 13th Floor (D-Styles, Qbert & Shortkut/ Invisibl Skratch Piklz) (2016)
- Noises in The Right Order (2019)
- 545 (D-Styles, Excess, Mike Boo & Pryvet Peepsho) (2019)
- 545 Khrung Phrung (D-Styles, Excess, Mike Boo & Pryvet Peepsho)
- Creme De La Creme (D-Styles & Nowaah The Flood) (2021)
- 545 808 (D-Styles, Excess, Mike Boo & Pryvet Peepsho) (2022)
- Pacific Standard Time (XP the Marxman, Rhettmatic & D-Styles) (2022)
- Fair Warning (D-Styles & WidowMaker) (2022)
- He Who Laughs Last (D-Styles & Substance810) (2023)
- The Periodic Tables of Excellence (D-Styles & J Scienide) (2022)
- Invincibl Rap Mislz (D-Styles & Napoleon Da Legend) (2023)
- There’s Hooli & There’s everyone Else (Da Fly Hooligan & The Beat Junkies)2024
- Beluga (Nowaah The Flood & D-Styles)2025
- Three Mimes & An Elephant (LMNO & D-Styles) 2025

=== EPs ===
- Sound Advice (2003) (with Daddy Kev and The Grouch)
- 545 (2019) (with Excess, Mike Boo, and Pryvet Peepsho)

=== Mixtapes ===
- Hot Sauce in the Dick Hole (1997) (with DJ Qbert)
- Stylus Wars (1997) with A-Trak

=== Singles ===
- "Return to Planetary Deterioration" b/w "Clifford's Mustache" (2001)
- "Felonius Funk" (2002)
- "John Wayne on Acid" (2003)
- "Beautiful Fog" b/w "Millions of Locusts Swarming" (2007)

=== Guest appearances ===
- Rob Swift - "Salsa Scratch" from Sound Event (2002)
- DJ Greyboy -"Son Ray" (with Ricci Rucker) from Soul Mosaic (2000)
- Awol One & Daddy Kev- Souldoubt (2001)
- Busdriver - Temporary Forever (2002)
- Busdriver - Cosmic Cleavage (2004)
- Buck 65 - "Rough House Blues", "Surrender to Strangeness", "The Floor", and "Blanc-Bec" from Secret House Against the World (2005)
- Birdy Nam Nam - "Il y a un cauchemar dans mon placard" from Birdy Nam Nam (2005)
- Edit - "Crunk de Gaulle" from Certified Air Raid Material (2007)
- Buck 65 - Dirtbike (2008)
- Themselves - "The Mark" from Crowns Down (2009)
- Nocando - "DSD2" from Jimmy the Lock (2010)
- DJ Kentaro - "Crossfader" from Contrast (2012)
- The Gaslamp Killer- "Impulse" from Breakthrough (2012)
- Jonwayne - "You Can Love Me When I'm Dead" from Rap Album One (2013)
- Bambu - "Last Year" from Sun of a Gun (2013)
- Jesse Medina - "In the Moment" from Meet Jesse Medina (2014)
- Kraddy - "The Prestige" from Be a Light (2014)
- Self Jupiter & Kenny Segal (The Kleenrz)- "Season 2 LP"
- Jonwayne - "TED Talk" from Rap Album Two (2017)
- BeatBombers - "BeatBombers LP" (2017)
- Conway the Machine & Big Ghost- If It Bleeds It Can Be Killed (2021)
- Ransom & Big Ghost -"Heavy is the Head LP" (2021)
- Jae Skeese & Big Ghost -"Authenticity Check LP" (2022)
- Conway the Machine & Big Ghost- "What has been blessed cannot be cursed LP" (2022)
- Che Noir & Big Ghost-Noir or Never (2023)
- Oppenheimer, Rome Streetz & Jay Royale- "Laurels" (2023)
- Nosaj Thing -"Look both ways" from Continua (2023)
- Substance810 & Hobgoblin -"Death waits in the dark LP" (2023)
- RhymeStyleTroop & Dead Poetz Society- "Heart of the city LP" (2023)
- Sonnyjim & Lee Scott- "Ortolan & Armagnac LP" (2023)
- Gel Roc & Paris Zax (Loss Control) 2024
- Chubs & Wino Willy (Suffolk County Zoo) 2024
- Planet B (The Bouquet) 2024
- KRS One, Zeebra & DJ Yutaka(Jump) 2024
- Napoleon Da Legend & JR Swiftz (Raining Sledgehammers) 2024
- Echo Finch (Hubris like this) 2025
- Sonnyjim (Exotic Peng Collection lp) 2025

=== Productions ===
- DJ Qbert - "Razorblade Alcohol Slide" from Wave Twisters (1998)
- Roc Raida - "The Murder Faktory" from Champion Sounds (2003)
- Busdriver - "Avantcore (D-Styles Remix)" from Fear of a Black Tangent (2005)
- Bambu - "Last Year" from Sun of a Gun (2013)
- Self Jupiter ft. Blu & Volume 10- "Caked Up" (2019)
- Scuba Chicken - "Alyssa Milano" and "Pumpin' Gas" from Ode to Malyssa Ilano (2021)
- Pro Dillinger & Nowaah the Flood- "Know Better remix" (2022)
- Nowaah the Flood & Mach Hommy- "Akbar Pray Day remix" (2023)
- Megabusive & D-Styles- "Western Appliance" 2024
- Spit Gemz & D-Styles- "Cold Blooded" 2025

== Filmography ==
=== Film ===
- Wave Twisters (2001)
