= Thavius Beck =

American record producer and rapper

- Thavius Beck performing at Low End Theory in 2009.

Background information
- Also known as: Adlib
- Born: July 31, 1979 (age 46)
- Origin: Los Angeles, California, United States
- Genres: Hip hop; electronic
- Occupations: Producer; rapper
- Instrument: Sampler
- Years active: 1996–present
- Labels: Mush; Big Dada; Plug Research; Hit+Run
- Member of: Global Phlowtations; Lab Waste
- Website: soundcloud.com/thaviusbeck

Thavius Beck (born July 31, 1979) is an American record producer and rapper. He has been a member of Global Phlowtations and Lab Waste. He has also put out solo releases under the moniker Adlib. He is a certified trainer of Ableton Live and Bitwig Studio

== Biography ==
Thavius Beck is originally from Minneapolis, Minnesota. He moved to Los Angeles, California when he was 16.

In 2004, Thavius Beck released the solo album, Decomposition, on Mush Records. The track "To Make Manifest" from Decomposition appeared on the SuicideGirls: The First Tour video. In 2005, he released an album, Zwarte Achtegrond (which means "black background" in the Dutch language), in collaboration with fellow Los Angeles rapper Subtitle under the group name Lab Waste.

In 2006, Thavius Beck released the solo album, Thru, on Mush Records. In 2007, he contributed a remix of "Survivalism" for Nine Inch Nails, as well as producing several tracks for Saul Williams on The Inevitable Rise and Liberation of NiggyTardust!. He also produced the entirety of K-the-I???'s 2008 album, titled Yesterday, Today & Tomorrow.

In 2009, Thavius Beck released his third solo album, Dialogue. In 2012, he released The Most Beautiful Ugly on Plug Research.

== Discography ==
=== Thavius Beck ===
Albums

- Decomposition (2004)
- Thru (2006)
- Dialogue (2009)
- The Most Beautiful Ugly (2012)
- Technol O.G. (2017)

Mixtapes

- Give Us Free (2007)
- Symphony of the Spheres (2012)

EPs

- Urban Subsonic (2009)
- The Heavens Bleed Sunshine (2012)

Singles

- "Go!" b/w "Away" (2009)

=== Adlib ===
Albums

- Vs. (1998)
- Tune In (1999)
- Save Us (2000)
- Experience Experiments (2000)
- Operating the Generator (2000)
- Advanced Sound Unit (2002)
- Manipulator (2003)
- International Beats (2005)

EPs

- Two Eleven (2008)

=== Productions ===
- Sach - "Suckas Play My Back" and "Triangle" from Suckas Hate Me (2002)
- Subtitle - "Hard Light (That's Not It)" and "A Textbook Remix" from I'm Always Recovering from Tomorrow (2003)
- Saul Williams - "Act III Scene 2 (Shakespeare)" from Saul Williams (2004)
- Subtitle - "Cray Crazy" from Young Dangerous Heart (2005)
- Busdriver - "Happiness ('s Unit of Measurement)" and "Low Flying Winged Books" from Fear of a Black Tangent (2005)
- Subtitle - "Restructure / Reroute" and "Wait for It" from Terrain to Roam (2006)
- Modwheelmood - "As I Stand Here (Thavius Beck Remix)" from Things Will Change (Remixes) (2007)
- Saul Williams - "Black History Month" and "DNA" from The Inevitable Rise and Liberation of NiggyTardust! (2007)
- Busdriver - "Less Yes's, More No's (Thavius Beck Remix)" (2007)
- Andy Rosenberg/Greg Harris/Jeremy Averit - "The Art of Fish Magic" from Rosenberg/Harris/Averitt (2007)
- Nine Inch Nails - "Survivalism_Tardusted" from Survivalism (2007)
- Nine Inch Nails - "Survivalism" from Year Zero Remixed (2007)
- Mestizo - Black Square EP (2007)
- Busdriver - "Ellen Disingenuous" (2008)
- K-the-I??? - Yesterday, Today & Tomorrow (2008)
- K-the-I??? - "Finger Painting (Thavius Beck Remix)" (2008)
- Daedelus - "Touchtone (Thavius Beck Remix)" from Touchtone & FWF Remixes (2008)
- Sole and the Skyrider Band - "The Bridges Let Us Down (Thavius Beck Remix)" from Sole and the Skyrider Band Remix LP (2009)
- Bike for Three! - "Lazarus Phenomenon (Thavius Beck Remix)" (2009)
- BC - "Pop World (Thavius Beck Remix)" from Time Capsule Remixes (2009)
- Nocando - "Two Track Mind", "I'm On" and "Front Left Pocket" from Jimmy the Lock (2010)
- Bushwac - "We're Doing This for Your Own Good (Thavius Beck Remix)" from Fight! If You Can't Fight, Kick! If You Can't Kick, Bite! (2010)
- Oicho - "I Could Be (Thavius Beck Remix)" from Scent (2011)
- Kaigen - "Rust Belt Fellows" and "Spear & Shield" from Re: Bloomer (2011)
- Bigg Jus - "Black Roses (Thavius Beck's Los Angeles Beautiful Weather Mix)" (2012)
- Ira Lee - "Better Version of Now", "The Photographer", "The Black Guy Always Dies" and "Dragonheart" from Growl (2012)
- Nocando - "All Over a Bitch" from Tits & Explosions (2013)

=== Guest appearances ===
- Omid - "Subterranean Service" from Beneath the Surface (1998)
- Subtitle - "Restructure / Reroute" and "Wait for It" from Terrain to Roam (2006)
- K-the-I??? - "Marathon Man" from Yesterday, Today & Tomorrow (2008)
- Drummachinemike - "The Law of Averages" from Drum Machine Music (2014)
