= Cassette 3: The Marion Morrison Mixtape =

Mixtape by Jonwayne
- Released: July 30, 2013
- Recorded: 2013
- Genre: Hip-hop
- Length: 25:54
- Label: Self-released
- Producers: Jonwayne; Don Cannon; DJ Premier; Mndsgn; J Dilla; Madlib

Jonwayne chronology
Cassette 2 (2013)	Cassette 3: The Marion Morrison Mixtape (2013)	Rap Album One (2013)

Cassette 3: The Marion Morrison Mixtape is the sixth mixtape by American rapper Jonwayne. It was released as a free digital download and cassette tape on July 30, 2013. It contains guest appearances from Jeremiah Jae, Oliver the 2nd, Zeroh, and Flying Lotus (as Captain Murphy).

== Track listing ==
No.	Title	Producer(s)	Length
1.	"Ode To Mortality"	Jonwayne	4:14
2.	"Numbers On The Hoard"	Don Cannon	2:43
3.	"Blaq Cowboy"	DJ Premier	1:57
4.	"The Ritz"	Jeremiah Jae	2:01
5.	"Mean Muggin'" (featuring Jeremiah Jae and Oliver the 2nd)	Jonwayne	2:26
6.	"And Bullshit" (featuring Zeroh)	Jonwayne	3:14
7.	"Blaq Prussian" (featuring Jeremiah Jae and Oliver the 2nd)	Jonwayne	4:49
8.	"Altitude"	Jonwayne; Mndsgn	3:14
9.	"Dog It" (featuring Captain Murphy and Jeremiah Jae)	Jonwayne	4:17
10.	"Notes To Myself"	J Dilla	3:14
11.	"Marion Morrison"	Madlib	2:59
