= Thru =

Studio album by Thavius Beck
- Released: October 3, 2006
- Genre: Hip hop
- Length: 42:00
- Label: Mush Records
- Producer: Thavius Beck

Thavius Beck chronology
Decomposition (2004)	Thru (2006)	Dialogue (2009)

Thru is the second solo studio album by American hip hop musician Thavius Beck. It was released through Mush Records on October 3, 2006. It includes "'98", which was East Bay Express' "MP3 of the Day" on November 10, 2006.

== Critical reception ==
Professional ratings
Review scores
Source	Rating
AllMusic	4/5 stars
Brainwashed	favorable
Cyclic Defrost	favorable
Tiny Mix Tapes	3.5/5 stars

Rick Anderson of AllMusic gave the album 4 stars out of 5, calling it "a brilliant sophomore effort from a major talent in modern hip-hop." Matthew Jeanes of Brainwashed said: "This could easily be the kind of record that gets people who typically dismiss hip hop and electronic music as glossy, vacant, or superficial to rethink that position." Tom Smith of Cyclic Defrost commented that "[there] are frustrating things about this album, but it's undeniably ambitious, uncompromising, and very consistent."

== Track listing ==
No.	Title	Length
1.	"Sonic Sound"	1:46
2.	"He's Back"	2:36
3.	"Reaching"	2:11
4.	"Under Pressure"	3:51
5.	"Dedicated to Difficulty" (featuring 2Mex)	4:09
6.	"The Storm Before the Calm"	4:28
7.	"'98" (featuring Nocando)	3:21
8.	"Perpetual Pursuit"	3:35
9.	"Yet and Still..."	2:34
10.	"Lyrical Gunplay" (featuring Saul Williams)	4:38
11.	"Down" (featuring Mia Doi Todd)	3:34
12.	"Paranoia"	2:57
13.	"Dichotomy"	6:52
Total length:		42:00

== Personnel ==
Credits adapted from liner notes.

- Thavius Beck – vocals, production
- 2Mex – vocals (4)
- Nocando – vocals (7)
- Saul Williams – vocals (10)
- Mia Doi Todd – vocals (11)
