= And Everything Else... =

Studio album by Nobody
- Released: May 17, 2005
- Genre: Hip-hop
- Length: 44:02
- Label: Plug Research
- Producer: Nobody

Nobody chronology
Pacific Drift: Western Water Music Vol. 1 (2003)	And Everything Else... (2005)	One for All Without Hesitation (2010)

Professional ratings
Aggregate scores
Source	Rating
Metacritic	73/100
Review scores
Source	Rating
AllMusic	4/5 stars
City Pages	favorable
Dusted Magazine	favorable
Pitchfork	7.1/10
PopMatters	4/10 stars
Prefix	favorable
Spin	favorable
Stylus Magazine	B+
XLR8R	favorable

And Everything Else... is the third solo studio album by American hip-hop producer Nobody. It was released on Plug Research on May 17, 2005.

== Critical reception ==
At Metacritic, which assigns a weighted average score out of 100 to reviews from mainstream critics, the album received an average score of 73% based on 8 reviews, indicating "generally favorable reviews".

Ryan Dombal of Pitchfork gave the album a 7.1 out of 10, calling it "the producer's most diverse and song-based work yet." Adam Park of Stylus Magazine gave the album a grade of B+, saying: "With each track an alluring fusion of styles and influences that never somehow puts a foot wrong, Nobody has taken the concept of faceless producer to its appellation rendered conclusion and in doing so produced a record that positively teems with gleeful personality." Max Herman of XLR8R described it as "an electronic-induced trip, driven by an abnormal palette of sampled sounds and hip-hop-ready drum patterns."

== Track listing ==
No.	Title	Length
1.	"The Coast Is Clear (for Fireworks)"	3:54
2.	"What Is the Light?"	6:03
3.	"Spin the Bright Sun Rose"	3:14
4.	"Go Go Interlude Go"	2:00
5.	"Poor Angular Fellow"	3:40
6.	"Tilijem's Forrest"	3:52
7.	"You Can Know Her"	4:48
8.	"Jose De La Rues!!!"	2:26
9.	"Con Un Relampago"	4:02
10.	"Wake Up and Smell the Millennium"	3:30
11.	"Tori Oshi"	3:32
12.	"Siesta Con Susana"	3:02

== Personnel ==
Credits adapted from liner notes.

- Nobody – production, recording, mixing
- Jeff Harris – recording, mixing
- Omid Walizadeh – vocal recording
- Dave Cooley – mastering
- Chris Gunst – vocals (2)
- Jen Cohen – vocals (2)
- The Mega Farmer D's Overnight Orchestra – keyboards (2)
- Mia Doi Todd – lyrics (7), vocals (7)
- Paul Larson's Soundstripe – keyboards (8)
- Xololanxinco – lyrics (9), vocals (9)
- Prefuse 73 – collaboration (11)
- Gabriela Lopez – cover art, henna
- B+ – photography
- Keith Tamashiro – design
