= Yesterday, Today & Tomorrow (K-the-I??? album) =

Studio album by K-the-I???
- Released: November 4, 2008
- Genre: Hip-hop
- Length: 39:30
- Label: Mush Records
- Producer: Thavius Beck

K-the-I??? chronology
Broken Love Letter (2006)	Yesterday, Today & Tomorrow (2008)	Synesthesia (2011)

Singles from Yesterday, Today & Tomorrow
- 1. "Finger Painting" Released: 2008

Yesterday, Today & Tomorrow is a studio album by American hip-hop artist K-the-I???. It was originally released through Mush Records on November 4, 2008. In Europe, it was released through Ninja Tune on October 20, 2008. A music video was created for "Lead the Floor".

== Production ==
Having met at the 2006 South by Southwest, K-the-I??? and Thavius Beck remixed each others' songs. Afterward, in order to make the album, K-the-I??? moved from Cambridge, Massachusetts to Los Angeles, California. Entirely produced by Thavius Beck, the album features vocal contributions from Nocando, Thavius Beck, Vyle, Subtitle, High Priest, Busdriver, and Mestizo.

== Critical reception ==
Professional ratings
Aggregate scores
Source	Rating
Metacritic	76/100
Review scores
Source	Rating
AllMusic	3/5 stars
Cyclic Defrost	favorable
Exclaim!	favorable
The Guardian	4/5 stars
Now	NNN
PopMatters	7/10 stars
XLR8R	6.5/10

At Metacritic, which assigns a weighted average score out of 100 to reviews from mainstream critics, the album received an average score of 76, based on 8 reviews, indicating "generally favorable reviews".

Andrew Martin of PopMatters gave the album 7 stars out of 10, calling it "another top-notch album in 2008." Brigid Moore of XLR8R gave the album a 6.5 out of 10 and commented that "K-the-I??? has a bright future ahead." Omar Mouallem of Exclaim! praised Thavius Beck's production, stating: "His beats are charged with high-voltage electricity and are as interesting as the words above or below them." Jason Lymangrover of AllMusic gave the album 3 stars out of 5, writing: "Fans of esoteric underground rap should take notice."

== Track listing ==
No.	Title	Length
1.	"400 on the BPM"	1:38
2.	"Before the Session"	2:08
3.	"Trading Places" (featuring Nocando)	2:22
4.	"Decisions"	2:52
5.	"Cell-Shaded/Daydreams/Nightmares"	3:02
6.	"Marathon Man" (featuring Thavius Beck)	2:55
7.	"Let's Make Moves" (featuring Vyle)	2:32
8.	"Lead the Floor"	3:00
9.	"Stylin'" (featuring Subtitle)	2:02
10.	"Never Heard It Done Like This" (featuring High Priest)	2:37
11.	"Just Listen"	3:59
12.	"Sabbath Faster" (featuring Busdriver)	2:13
13.	"Finger Painting"	2:51
14.	"Man or Machine" (featuring Mestizo)	5:30
Total length:		39:30
