= Fear of a Black Tangent =

Studio album by Busdriver
- Released: February 22, 2005
- Genre: Progressive rap
- Length: 48:24
- Label: Mush Records
- Producers: Daedelus; Omid; Paris Zax; Thavius Beck; Danger Mouse

Busdriver chronology
| Cosmic Cleavage (2004) | Fear of a Black Tangent (2005) | RoadKillOvercoat (2007) |

Singles from Fear of a Black Tangent
- 1. "Avantcore" Released: January 18, 2005

Fear of a Black Tangent is the fourth studio album by American rapper Busdriver. It was originally released on Mush Records in 2005. In Europe, it was released on Big Dada.

== Critical reception ==
Professional ratings
Aggregate scores
| Source | Rating |
|---|---|
| Metacritic | 78/100 |
Review scores
| Source | Rating |
| AllMusic | 2.5/5 stars |
| The A.V. Club | favorable |
| BBC | favorable |
| Cokemachineglow | 82/100 |
| Exclaim! | favorable |
| MusicOMH | favorable |
| Pitchfork | 7.9/10 |
| PopMatters | 8/10 stars |
| Robert Christgau | A− |
| Stylus Magazine | B |

At Metacritic, which assigns a weighted average score out of 100 to reviews from mainstream critics, the album received an average score of 78, based on 14 reviews, indicating "generally favorable reviews".

Rollie Pemberton of Stylus Magazine gave the album a grade of B, saying: "The album is one of the few anti-industry freakouts that have appealed to me on both a conceptual and musical level, so whether or not you are familiar with Busdriver's skittering flow or innovative song structure, it's worth the time to see why he's so damn mad after all."

== Track listing ==
| No. | Title | Producer(s) | Length |
|---|---|---|---|
| 1. | "Yawning Zeitgeist Intro" (freestyle) | Daedelus | 1:30 |
| 2. | "Reheated Pop!" | Omid | 3:00 |
| 3. | "Unemployed Black Astronaut" | Paris Zax | 4:00 |
| 4. | "Happiness('s Unit of Measurement)" | Thavius Beck | 4:37 |
| 5. | "Avantcore" | Paris Zax | 2:24 |
| 6. | "Wormholes" | Daedelus | 4:26 |
| 7. | "Map Your Psyche" (featuring Abstract Rude and Ellay Khule) | Paris Zax | 4:15 |
| 8. | "Cool Band Buzz" | Danger Mouse | 3:28 |
| 9. | "Note Boom" | Paris Zax | 3:43 |
| 10. | "Low Flying Winged Books" | Thavius Beck | 4:56 |
| 11. | "Befriend the Friendless Friendster" | Daedelus | 3:38 |
| 12. | "Sphinx's Coonery" (featuring Myka 9 and 2Mex) | Paris Zax | 4:43 |
| 13. | "Lefty's Lament" | Daedelus | 3:41 |
| Total length: | | | 48:24 |

Expanded edition bonus tracks
| No. | Title | Producer(s) | Length |
|---|---|---|---|
| 14. | "Silence" (unlisted) | | 1:04 |
| 15. | "Avantcore (D-Styles Remix)" | D-Styles | 2:33 |
| 16. | "Happiness('s Unit of Measurement) (Prefuse 73 Remix)" | Prefuse 73 | 4:16 |
| 17. | "Unemployed Black Astronaut (Nobody Remix)" | Nobody | 4:39 |
| Total length: | | | 61:04 |

== Personnel ==
Credits adapted from liner notes.

- Busdriver – vocals
- Daedelus – production (1, 6, 11, 13)
- Omid – production (2)
- Paris Zax – production (3, 5, 7, 9, 12)
- Thavius Beck – production (4, 10)
- Subtitle – keyboards (5)
- Abstract Rude – vocals (7)
- Ellay Khule – vocals (7)
- Danger Mouse – production (8)
- Kevin McNulty – keyboards (9)
- Myka 9 – vocals (12)
- 2Mex – vocals (12)
- Isaac Sprintis – guitar (12)
