= Mndsgn =

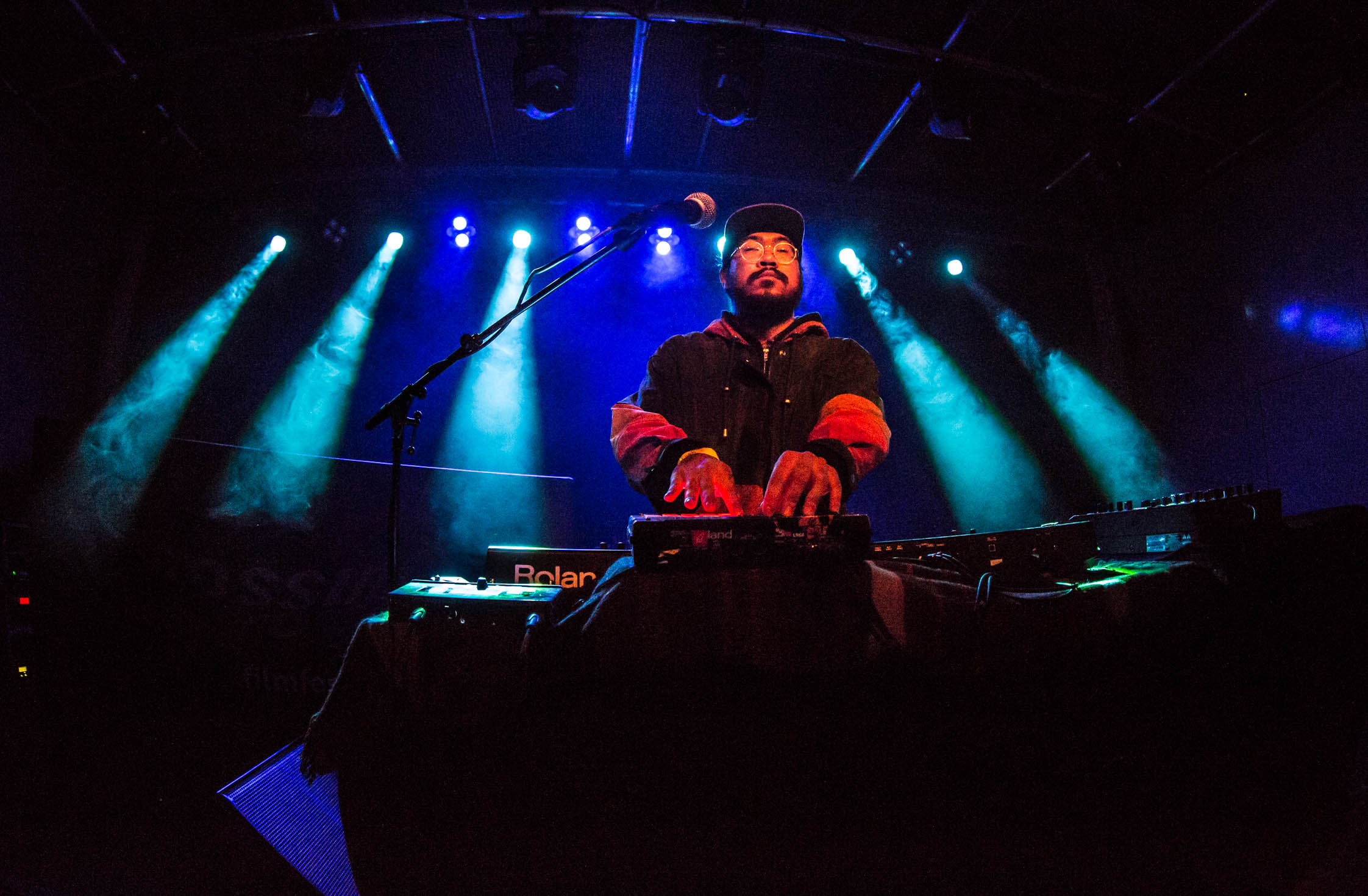
- CE17 – Nightline 27/04: Mndsgn & DJs Sofie and Andaka

Background information
- Born: Ringgo Ancheta; San Diego, California, U.S.
- Origin: Los Angeles, California, U.S.
- Genres: Alternative; Hip hop; Jazz
- Occupation: musician
- Years active: 2009–present
- Labels: Akashik; Fresh Selects; Klipm0de; Leaving; Stones Throw
- Website: mndsgn.bandcamp.com

Ringgo Ancheta, better known by his stage name Mndsgn (pronounced "mind design"), is an American record producer and singer-songwriter based in Los Angeles, California.

== Biography ==
Mndsgn was born Ringgo Ancheta in San Diego, California and was raised in New Jersey. He is the youngest of four in a family of Filipino descent. In his formative years, his mother worked as a nurse's assistant and his father was a Navy man. Growing up, he was immersed in music in various forms—watching his uncle's Navy band rehearse, attending his sisters' school talent shows and their choreographed dance routines, being a regular at Philly/Tri-state breakdancing events, and experiencing gospel music at church. At around 13 years old, his older brother introduced him to computer based music production software, Fruity Loops, quickly sparking a deep connection with the art.

In 2008, platforms like Myspace and AIM messenger connected Mndsgn with beatmakers Knxwledge, Suzi Analogue and devonwho to form Klipm0de. The collective played and released beat tapes through Bandcamp. Ancheta relocated to Los Angeles in 2011 and self-released beat tapes as well as a few projects distributed by labels Leaving and Fresh Selects, and regularly performed at local hubs such as Low End Theory.

In 2013, Mndsgn collaborated with Danny Brown on "Sweeney Song," which appeared on Classic Drug References Vol. 1. His first solo studio album for Stones Throw Records, titled Yawn Zen, was released in 2014. He followed up with Body Wash in 2016, an album that drew heavily on ‘80s R&B and boogie which Vinyl Me, Please cited as one of "The 10 Best Stones Throw Albums To Own On Vinyl", before releasing raw, mixtape-style records Snax and Snaxx in 2018 and 2019, the latter which Clash called "an instant classic" and "everything we’ve come to expect and more, from the San Diego beat maker".

In March 2021, Mndsgn announced his third studio album for Stones Throw Records, Rare Pleasure. Inspired by R&B, soundtrack music, psychedelia and jazz, Rare Pleasure features Kiefer (musician), Swarvy, Carlos Niño, Fousheé, Devin Morrison, Anna Wise and more. Rare Pleasure was released in June 2021 on Stones Throw Records.

In addition to his solo work, Mndsgn co-wrote and produced Prophet’s 2018 album, Wanna Be Your Man, and Peach Fuzz with Tyler, the Creator.

== Discography ==
=== Studio albums ===
- Breatharian (2013)
- Yawn Zen (2014)
- Vivians (2015) (with The Koreatown Oddity, as Vivians)
- Body Wash (2017)
- Snax (2018)
- Snaxx (2019)
- Forever in Your Sun (2020) (with Lionmilk)
- Rare Pleasure (2021)
- Snaxxx (2023)

=== Compilation albums ===
- Funraiser Vol. 2: Skrayons (2009)
- Episodes (2010) (with Devonwho)
- A Rap Vacation X-Mas (2013) (with Ahwlee)
- Gonna B OK (2020)
- HOWIKEEPFROMGOINUNDER (2025)

=== Mixtapes ===
- Frugal Earth (2013)
- Frugal Earth Vol. Two (2013)
- U SHOULDA LET GOD COOK (2024)
- Frugal Earth Vol. 4 (2025)
- ZEBRAMAN (2026)

=== EPs ===
- 3P (2009)
- Lights & Tunnels (2009)
- Statik Mumblin (2011)
- NoMaps (2011)
- Daypass (2011)
- Exts (2012)
- Feels (2012)
- Oblique Kitchn (2012)
- Bed (2013)
- Inedia (2014)
- Surface Outtakes (2014)
- Ultrastanding (2023)
- Pentimentos (2023)
- BURNT CATFISH (2023)

=== Singles ===
- "Flybutter" (2010)
- "Walter Rand Center of Transportation" (2010)
- "Cold Crush" (2016) (with Kirkis)
- "Deviled Eggs" (2019)
- "Sumdim" (2019)
- "Truth Of The Matter (Sofie Cover)" (2020)
- "Hope You're Doin' Better" (2021)
- "Slowdance" (2021)

=== Guest appearances ===
- Devonwho - "Spaghettiisland" from Funraiser Vol. 1: Thumbtracks (2009)
- Sir Froderick - "Dodooonshoe Pt. 7" from Reconnecting! (2011)
- Jonwayne - "Featuring Mndsgn" from Bowser (2011)
- Sir Froderick - "Cilantro" from The Brief Wondrous (2012)
- Swarvy - "Pebbles", "Tooth", and "Sigh" from Trillian (2012)
- Jonwayne - "Neckbrokeblues" from Oodles of Doodles (2012)
- Sir Froderick - "After" from Consolidate (2013)
- Jonwayne - "Sandals" from Rap Album One (2013)
- Johnah Levine Collective - "Zootcase" from Attention Deficit (2017)
- Chai - "In Pink" from Wink (2021)

=== Productions ===
- Suzi Analogue - "Son" from World. Excerpts 1–9 (2009)
- Suzi Analogue - "Quarter Inches (Brain Waverlude)" from Nnxtape (2010)
- Danny Brown - "Sweeney Song" from Classic Drug References, Vol. 1 (2013)
- Jonwayne - "Altitude" from Cassette 3: The Marion Morrison Mixtape (2013)
- Ivan Ave - Low Jams (2014)
- Doja Cat - "Nunchucks" from Purrr! (2014)
- Yuk. - "Kuya Was Here" from A n a k (2015)
- Pyramid Vritra - "224 (Mndsgn remix)" from PV4 (2015)
- Ivan Ave - Helping Hands (2016)
- Asal Hazel - "Usayudo" (2017)
- Ill Camille - "Almost There" from Heirloom (2017)
- Quelle Chris - "Popeye" from Being You Is Great, I Wish I Could Be You More Often (2017)
- Milkavelli - "ZZZ" from Cult Member (2017)
- Asal Hazel - "UTMT", "Royal Interlude", and "Make Love" from Like Water (2018)
- Prophet - Wanna Be Your Man (2018)
- Tyler, The Creator - "Peach Fuzz" (2018)
- SiR - "War" from November (2018)
- Fatima - "Dang" from And Yet It's All Love (2018)
- M.E.D. and Guilty Simpson - "Pie" from Child of the Jungle (2019)
