= Lab Waste =

American hip hop group

- Origin: Los Angeles, California, United States
- Genres: Hip hop
- Years active: 2001–present
- Labels: Temporary Whatever
- Members: Thavius Beck; Subtitle

Lab Waste is an American hip hop group from Los Angeles, California. It consists of Thavius Beck and Subtitle. In 2005, the duo released the first album, Zwarte Achtegrond, on Temporary Whatever.

== Discography ==
=== Albums ===
- Zwarte Achtegrond (2005)

=== EPs ===
- Can I Get It How You Live? (2008)
