= Mystic Chords of Memory (album) =

Studio album by Mystic Chords of Memory
- Released: June 22, 2004
- Recorded: 2003
- Studio: Clear Creek Studios, Brookdale, California, U.S.; Trout Gulch Studios, Aptos, California, U.S.
- Genre: Alternative rock
- Length: 39:25
- Label: Rough Trade Records
- Producer: Mystic Chords of Memory

Mystic Chords of Memory chronology
Mystic Chords of Memory (2004)	Tree Colored See (2006)

Mystic Chords of Memory is the debut studio album by American alternative rock band Mystic Chords of Memory. It was released on Rough Trade Records in 2004.

== Critical reception ==
Professional ratings
Review scores
Source	Rating
AllMusic	4/5 stars
Dusted Magazine	mixed
Exclaim!	favorable
Pitchfork	7.7/10

Tim Sendra of AllMusic gave the album 4 stars out of 5, commenting that "It has the feel of a classic bedroom/basement recording -- which is to say, relaxed and free of pressure." Cam Lindsay of Exclaim! wrote, "The snail-paced placidity, fabricated by sounds of the sea and the harp, makes a good portion of the record feel like an extended lull." Amanda Petrusich of Pitchfork gave the album a 7.7 out of 10 and praised "its soft melodies, sweet vocals, and scratchy DIY production".

== Track listing ==
No.	Title	Length
1.	"Berry Creek Falls"	3:07
2.	"Soul Through the Bullet Hole"	4:04
3.	"Golden Dome"	2:52
4.	"Sure, Bert"	4:34
5.	"Like a Lobster"	4:23
6.	"Eyes on Sides of Heads"	4:32
7.	"Open End"	4:34
8.	"Last One"	4:02
9.	"Mongo and Arky"	3:37
10.	"Pi and a Bee"	3:33
Total length:		39:25

== Personnel ==
Credits adapted from liner notes.

- Chris Gunst – vocals, guitar, keyboards, drums, sampler, melodica, autoharp
- Jen Cohen – vocals, bass guitar, drums, harp
- Ben Knight – guitar (2–5), vocals (5)
- Scott Coffey – violin (3, 5, 7, 10)
