= Rap Album Two =

Studio album by Jonwayne
- Released: February 17, 2017
- Studios: Cosmic Zoo, Los Angeles
- Genre: Hip-hop
- Length: 44:37
- Labels: Authors Recording Company; The Order Label
- Producers: Jonwayne (also exec.); Shane Sakanoi (co-exec.); Eets; Oliver the 2nd; DJ Babu; Dibiase

Jonwayne chronology
Jonwayne Is Retired (2015)	Rap Album Two (2017)

Singles from Rap Album Two
- 1. "Out of Sight" Released: January 19, 2017; 2. "TED Talk" Released: February 2, 2017

Rap Album Two is the fifth studio album by American hip-hop artist Jonwayne. It was released on February 17, 2017, by Jonwayne's own imprint Authors Recording Company and Daddy Kev's The Order Label.

== Background ==
The album comes following Jonwayne's hiatus from the music industry, initially presented as a retirement taken while fighting a stint of alcoholism. On December 7, 2016, Jonwayne shared an Open Letter to his fanbase via his Facebook page that detailed his struggles that led to the cancellation of a European Tour and departure from the music industry. This letter concludes with the announcement of Rap Album Two.

== Release ==
Up until the announcement of the release date for the album, multiple one-off singles were released by Jonwayne to the music sharing site SoundCloud. In order, these include "Wonka," "That's O.K.," "Jump Shot," and "40 Winks." However, he said a month before the release of Rap Album Two that none of the singles would be on the album. Two days after that announcement on January 19, 2017, the first single from the album, "Out of Sight," was released, along with an announcement of the release date of the album. On February 2, Jonwayne released the first track of the album, "TED Talk," as a single. On the day of the album's release, he released a music video for the last track on the album, "These Words Are Everything."

== Critical reception ==
Professional ratings
Review scores
Source	Rating
AllMusic	4/5 stars
Exclaim!	8/10
HipHopDX	4.1/5
Pitchfork	7.6/10

The album was placed at number 35 on Rolling Stone's "40 Best Rap Albums of 2017" list, as well as number 20 on HipHopDX's "Best Rap Albums of 2017" list. Tom Breihan of Stereogum placed it at number 24 on the "40 Best Rap Albums of 2017" list.

== Track listing ==
No.	Title	Writer(s)	Producer(s)	Length
1.	"TED Talk"	Jonwayne	Eets	3:48
2.	"Live from the Fuck You"	Jonwayne; Nick Colletti	Jonwayne	2:54
3.	"Human Condition"	Jonwayne	Oliver the 2nd	3:21
4.	"Out of Sight"	Jonwayne	Jonwayne	4:27
5.	"The Single"	Jonwayne; Shane Sakanoi	Jonwayne	1:40
6.	"Paper"	Jonwayne; Shango	Jonwayne	3:22
7.	"City Lights"	Jonwayne	DJ Babu; Jonwayne^{[a]}	3:53
8.	"Rainbow"	Jonwayne; Danny Watts	Jonwayne	3:08
9.	"Afraid of Us"	Jonwayne; Zeroh; Shango	Jonwayne	7:25
10.	"Blue Green"	Jonwayne; Low Leaf	Jonwayne	3:43
11.	"Hills"	Jonwayne; Zeroh	Jonwayne	1:48
12.	"These Words Are Everything"	Jonwayne	Dibiase	5:11

Notes

- ^{^[a]} signifies an additional producer

== Personnel ==
Credits adapted from the album's liner notes.

Musicians

- Jonwayne – vocals, composer, engineering, arrangement
- Juan Alderete de la Pena – bass guitar (track 4)
- Jameel Bruner – keyboards (tracks 2, 3, 8)
- Nick Colletti – composer (track 2)
- D-Styles – scratches (track 1)
- Kiefer – keyboards (tracks 6, 7, 9, 10)
- Low Leaf – composer, harp (track 10)
- Oliver the 2nd – production (track 3)
- Patrick Paige II – bass guitar (tracks 2, 7)
- Shane Sakanoi – composer (track 5)
- Shango – composer (tracks 6, 9)
- Sofie – strings (tracks 3, 4)
- Danny Watts – composer (track 8)
- Zeroh – composer (tracks 9, 11)

Production

- Jonwayne – executive producer, production (tracks 2, 4–6, 8–11), additional production (track 7)
- Shane Sakanoi – co-executive producer
- Daddy Kev – mixing, mastering
- Dibiase – production (track 12)
- DJ Babu – production (track 7)
- Eets – production (track 1)

Design

- Theo Jemison – photography
