= Zwarte Achtegrond =

Studio album by Lab Waste
- Released: January 18, 2005
- Genre: Hip hop
- Length: 65:05
- Label: Temporary Whatever
- Producer: Lab Waste

Professional ratings
Review scores
Source	Rating
Brainwashed	(unfavorable)
Miami New Times	(favorable)
Spin	(favorable)

Zwarte Achtegrond is the first studio album by Lab Waste, an American hip hop duo consisting of Thavius Beck and Subtitle. It was released on Temporary Whatever in 2005.

== Track listing ==
No.	Title	Length
1.	"Introduction"	0:55
2.	"2 in 1"	3:31
3.	"Secret Elemental Block #001"	1:07
4.	"Get the Signal"	3:31
5.	"Dope Beat (Or Something)"	4:42
6.	"Static Wednesday"	4:40
7.	"Tell Her to Come Overrrr"	2:44
8.	"Too Close/2 Clothes"	3:56
9.	"The Debris Meets the Sea...."	3:20
10.	"Stress'd Rest"	2:21
11.	"Internal Psi/Sci/Ence"	4:02
12.	"Secret Elemental Block #002"	1:04
13.	"In Conclusion"	1:23
