= The Most Beautiful Ugly =

Studio album by Thavius Beck
- Released: September 11, 2012
- Genre: Instrumental hip hop
- Length: 40:00
- Label: Plug Research
- Producer: Thavius Beck

Thavius Beck chronology
Dialogue (2009)	The Most Beautiful Ugly (2012)	Technol O.G. (2017)

The Most Beautiful Ugly is the fourth solo studio album by American hip hop musician Thavius Beck. It was released through Plug Research on September 11, 2012.

== Critical reception ==
Professional ratings
Aggregate scores
Source	Rating
Metacritic	69/100
Review scores
Source	Rating
AllMusic	3.5/5 stars
Contactmusic.com	4.5/5 stars
PopMatters	7/10 stars
The Skinny	4/5 stars

At Metacritic, which assigns a weighted average score out of 100 to reviews from mainstream critics, the album received an average score of 69, based on 4 reviews, indicating "generally favorable reviews".

Jason Lymangrover of AllMusic gave the album 3.5 stars out of 5, saying: "Two skills he has mastered in the past, mood and texture, make this record especially listenable, although sometimes the productions are so professionally crafted that they sound sterile." He called it "a great showcase for his digital, beat-oriented productions and kaleidoscopic tastes." Bram E. Gieben of The Skinny gave the album 4 stars out of 5, stating that the album "has about fifty times as many ideas crammed into it as most hip-hop records, even without his mythic, hallucinatory, Hermetic philosophy-influenced rhymes."

== Track listing ==
No.	Title	Length
1.	"Eye of the Beholder (Intro)"	2:53
2.	"Break Til Broken"	2:10
3.	"ABV"	3:19
4.	"Atmos"	4:11
5.	"Feel Me/Fear Me"	2:01
6.	"Whether or Not"	0:52
7.	"Labward Bound"	1:46
8.	"Terror Byte"	3:02
9.	"Imma Get So"	2:24
10.	"Joy (Bring It)"	2:58
11.	"In Your Eyes"	3:24
12.	"Ain't Nothin'"	3:02
13.	"Tears of Fire"	2:43
14.	"Altered Minions"	2:25
15.	"Shucky Ducky Chuckie"	2:51
Total length:		40:00

Vinyl edition bonus tracks: The Heavens Bleed Sunshine
No.	Title	Length
1.	"Thanks"	3:12
2.	"Watson"	3:03
3.	"He's a Mute"	2:01
4.	"GLK Jack"	3:23
5.	"Rationalizing Emotion"	2:39
Total length:		14:21

== Personnel ==
Credits adapted from liner notes.

- Thavius Beck – production, recording, mixing
- Emilie Quinquis – vocals (13)
- Mear One – artwork
- Laz Pit – layout
