= Third Sight =

American hip hop group

Third Sight is an underground rap trio from the Bay Area of California. Formed in the early 1990s, the group's members are MC Jihad, Dufunk, and D-Styles.

== History ==
Third Sight's debut album, Golden Shower Hour, was released in 1998. After its release, the group's three members collected material for a second full-length album, which was released in 2006 as Symbionese Liberation Album. The album's title was inspired by the violent tactics of the Symbionese Liberation Army, of which the album is highly critical due to their abduction of Patty Hearst. This criticism is partly based on the group's experiences with the Army; in the album's liner notes, Jihad states that "My family attended one of the food giveaway programs that the SLA demanded as ransom for Patty Hearst", and describes the SLA as "bank-robbing, home-invading, gun-toting hippies-gone-bad".

== Critical reception ==
Symbionese Liberation Album received mixed reviews from critics. AllMusic's Tim DiGravina gave it 2 stars out of 5, describing its music as "slightly above average indie hip-hop of a self-aggrandizing, sometimes scatological, and misogynistic nature." Exclaim!'s Brendan Murphy wrote of the album that "the beats are not mind-blowing, nor any different than any Bay Area underground you've heard before." In a more favorable review, Daryl Stoneage wrote that "fans of groups like Dilated Peoples and Non-Phixion, who appreciate their hip-hop a little darker, will want to check this out for sure." Michael Frauenhofer gave the album 7 out of 10 stars, writing that "it’s a somewhat calmly paced dish but undeniably hard-hitting" and describing the group's style "plodding, never awkward, slow but relentlessly d-o-p-e".

== Discography ==
- Golden Shower Hour (Darc Brothas, 1998)
- Symbionese Liberation Album (Disgruntled/Amalgam Entertainment, 2006)
- Chillin' With Dead Bodies In A B-Boy Stance (Disgruntled, 2012)
- IV (Disgruntled, 2016)
