= Astronautica =

- Born: Edrina Martinez
- Origin: Los Angeles, California, U.S.
- Genres: Electronic; Hip-Hop; Indie
- Occupation: Producer
- Label: Alpha Pup
- Website: astronautica.la

Edrina Martinez, better known by her stage name Astronautica, is an experimental electronic, indie, hip hop, and beat music producer. She is currently based in Los Angeles, California, and signed with Alpha Pup Records, an independent label co-founded by Daddy Kev of Low End Theory.

== Career ==
Learning to play the guitar by ear at an early age, Astronautica soon began mixing her own samples and beats on the Akai APC 40. After early encouragement by Daedelus, the multi-instrumentalist was drawn into the professional musical community of California and soon began producing with Ableton Live.

After signing to Alpha Pup Records in 2013, Astronautica has released Replay Last Night (2013), Waikiki - EP (2014), Gemini (2016), Gemini Remixes - EP (2018), and Death Valley (2018). She participated in the Alpha Pup West Coast 2016 Summer Tour, and has played twice at the Coachella Valley Music and Arts Festival and the Low End Theory Festival.

== Music ==
Jim Fusilli has described Astronautica's performance at the Low End Theory Festival 2016 in The Wall Street Journal. “Astronautica spun warm, swaying electronica, then she picked up an electric guitar and added lush chords to the already-satisfying sound.”

[Astronautica] “crafts instrumental electronic dance music filled with pensive, muffled rhythms that wend through gratifyingly complicated melodies,” according to Randall Roberts in the Los Angeles Times.

Layne Weiss of the LA Weekly adds, “Her music is like an abstract painting come to life, with colorful, dreamy and complex yet playful melodies.” Jeff Weiss also describes her music in the LA Weekly: "Astronautica's aesthetic synthesizes her past influences. There are sauna-warm electric guitar riffs, moody keyboard loops, R&B samples and the after-midnight soul of fellow LET alumni Shlohmo, Teebs and Nosaj Thing. As the elements in her name indicate, the sound is both celestial and watery -- beat as cosmic soup."

Chris Martins in Spin Magazine wrote, “Los Angeles producer Edrina Martinez has chosen her nom-de-beats quite well — Astronautica evokes not only outer space exploration, but also those Nautica jackets that went hand-in-hand with the R&B-soundtracked ’90s that some of us hold so dear. However, as evidenced by the song below, her music isn’t some cheap throwback. Rather, it’s part of soul music’s in-progress electronic evolution…”

Peter Holslin of Vice (magazine) notes that Astronautic "builds on the path set by the likes of Flying Lotus, Tokimonsta, Daedelus and Nosaj Thing," and that she "embraces a wide array of influences—from Nirvana to Aaliyah, dance music to hip-hop, the ocean to the stars—filtering it all into her own luminous, mellowed-out sound."

In an article in The Hundreds magazine entitled "How Astronautica Is Paving the Way for Women in LA's Beat Scene," she is highlighted as an artist who "understands the importance of celebrating her fellow female musicians." Nylon (magazine) also showcases the artist's impact on the EDM scene: "Astronautica, also known as Edrina Martinez, has already proven to be a powerful force on the electronic music scene—and she’s only 24 years old."

Her music has also been featured on LA's KCRW radio show Morning Becomes Eclectic, The Fader, and XLR8R

== Tech ==
Astronautica produces music using Ableton Live, Akai APC40 MKII, Novation Launchpad Pro, Ableton Push, and Novation Launchkey 61.

== Personal life ==
Martinez grew up in San Dimas, California.

== Discography ==
Albums:

- Replay Last Night (2013)
- Gemini (2016)
- Death Valley (2018)

EPs:

- Waikiki (2014)
- Gemini Remixes (2018)

Features:

- July 4th (feat. Astronautica) by Tel Cairo
