= X2 (album) =

Studio album by Tes
- Released: 2003
- Studio: Stackhouse Recordings
- Genre: Hip-hop
- Length: 31:53
- Label: Lex
- Producers: Tes; DJ Ese

Tes chronology
X2 (2003)	Go Blonde (2015)

Singles from x2
- 1. "New New York" Released: 2003

X2 is the debut studio album by American rapper Terrence Tessora under the pseudonym Tes. It was released in 2003 through Lex Records.

== Background ==
Terrence Tessora, better known under the pseudonym Tes, is an American rapper from Brooklyn, New York. X2 (pronounced "times two") is his debut album. It features guest appearances from Lodeck (on "Late to Work") and Afra (on "Big Shots"). "Say When" is produced by DJ Ese. "New New York" was released as a single from the album. The album was released in 2003 through Lex Records.

== Critical reception ==
Professional ratings
Review scores
Source	Rating
AllMusic	2.5/5 stars
NME	9/10
Pitchfork	8.2/10
Uncut	2/5 stars

John Power of MusicOMH stated, "The atmosphere throughout the album is one of eerie horrorcore, sparse beats overlaid with spooky strings and clanking pianos whilst Tes maintains a tight flow of introspective thoughtful lyrics." He added, "Tes keeps it listenable and it never becomes self indulgent or boring." James Jam of NME described the album as "a record brimming with courage and hope, which also provides a document of the skills this bright MC brings to the table of smart, sussed and innovative hip-hop." John Bush of AllMusic commented that Tes "has a lot of ideas," adding that "he can't quite organize them into intriguing experiments or well-wrought songs." Selena Hsu of XLR8R wrote, "At his best, the skilled, bristly production is meaty enough to support his wide plank of a voice, but when he's rapping over dustier atmospherics, it's a strange mismatch of brassy rap and gray desolation."

== Track listing ==
All tracks are written by Terrence Tessora, except where noted.

X2 track listing
No.	Title	Writer(s)	Length
1.	"Times Two In"		1:11
2.	"Say When" (produced by DJ Ese)	Tessora; J. Furgeson	4:03
3.	"New New York"		3:58
4.	"Late to Work" (featuring Lodeck)	Tessora; B. Volfson	3:04
5.	"Plasma"		1:13
6.	"Fooltime"		2:55
7.	"Big Shots" (featuring Afra)	Tessora; A. Fujioka	4:05
8.	"Change"		2:14
9.	"Off on Monday"		1:19
10.	"Receiver"		2:44
11.	"Trigga da Whistla"		2:34
12.	"Times Two Out"		2:33
Total length:			31:53

== Personnel ==
Credits adapted from liner notes.

- Tes – vocals, production (1, 3–12)
- DJ Ese – production (2)
- Lodeck – vocals (4)
- Afra – vocals (7)
- Prince – recording, mixing
- Alan Duches – mastering
- ehquestionmark.com – artwork
