= Pyramidi =

Studio album by Radioinactive
- Released: August 28, 2001
- Genre: Hip hop
- Length: 70:30
- Label: Mush Records
- Producer: Antimc; Radioinactive; Sunny; OD; Liferexall

Radioinactive chronology
Pyramidi (2001)	Soundtrack to a Book (2006)

Pyramidi is the debut solo studio album by American hip hop artist Radioinactive. It was released on Mush Records in 2001.

== Critical reception ==
Professional ratings
Review scores
Source	Rating
AllMusic	3/5 stars
Robert Christgau	(2-star Honorable Mention)
Pitchfork	6.7/10
Portland Mercury	3.5/4 stars

Kingsley Marshall of AllMusic gave the album 3 stars out of 5, saying, "The resultant aural complexity amounts to one of the tougher listening experiences to be found in the Mush catalog, but will offer endless joy to those in search of something advanced." Brad Haywood of Pitchfork gave the album a 6.7 out of 10 and commented that "prescience and creativity give way to overkill and lack of execution on this one." He added, "This one might even be worth owning just for its distinctiveness." Julianne Shepherd of the Portland Mercury gave the album 3.5 stars out of 4, saying, "[T]he trippiness is enhanced by about seven vocal tracks on each song, making it sound like there's a lot of Radio-inactives on your headphones. Pyramidi is like looking at hiphop through a snowglobe, or without gravity."

== Track listing ==
All tracks are written by Kamal Humphrey de Iruretagoyena, except "Mud" by Iruretagoyena and Shovelhead and "Una Cosa" by Iruretagoyena and Sesquipedalien.

No.	Title	Producer(s)	Length
1.	"Intro"		1:07
2.	"Launch Padlock Smithereen"	Antimc	3:22
3.	"Look Within"	Radioinactive	0:29
4.	"Pyramidi"	Antimc; Radioinactive	4:21
5.	"Clam Chowder Day"	Sunny	1:31
6.	"Before the Thought"	Antimc; Radioinactive	3:53
7.	"Be Fulfilled"	Radioinactive	0:43
8.	"The Music"	OD; Radioinactive	3:35
9.	"Sufi Niteclub"	Radioinactive	0:37
10.	"My Education"	Antimc	5:35
11.	"Mud"	Radioinactive	3:42
12.	"Bop Nightmare"	Radioinactive	0:46
13.	"Impulsive"	Antimc	0:53
14.	"May Your Journey Be Filled with Light"	OD	1:38
15.	"Una Cosa"	OD	4:03
16.	"Swallow This Blanket"	Antimc	1:29
17.	"Witch Doctor"	Antimc; Radioinactive	0:18
18.	"Can't Crossover"	Antimc	3:52
19.	"Hair, Shoes & Eyebrows Part II"	Liferexall	2:51
20.	"Dub Funeral"	Radioinactive	0:37
21.	"Childish"	Radioinactive	2:39
22.	"Indecisive"	Antimc	0:40
23.	"Sasquatch"	Sunny	2:36
24.	"De Iruretagoyena"	Antimc	4:19
25.	"Our Souls"	Antimc	5:18
26.	"Formal Lecture on Poetry"	Antimc; Radioinactive	0:27
27.	"Alice in Acidland"	Radioinactive	0:27
28.	"Organ Grinder"	Antimc	2:42
29.	"The Earl of Nine Teas Walks with Kaleidescope Through the Streets of Yesteryear"	Antimc	4:46
30.	"Washing Broken Dishes"	Sunny	1:13
Total length:			70:30
