= Distant Drummer (album) =

Studio album by Omid
- Released: February 19, 2002
- Genre: Instrumental hip-hop
- Length: 51:26
- Label: Beneath the Surface
- Producer: Omid

Omid chronology
Beneath the Surface (1998)	Distant Drummer (2002)	Monolith (2003)

Distant Drummer is a studio album by American hip-hop producer Omid. It was released by Beneath the Surface on February 19, 2002. It draws inspiration from the music of Sun Ra, as well as a science fiction book Hyperion. The tracks from the album appeared on Logic 12, a Logic Skateboard Media video, in 2002.

== Critical reception ==
Professional ratings
Review scores
Source	Rating
UCD Advocate	B+
UG Rap	8.5/10
Urban Smarts	favorable
XLR8R	favorable

Writing for XLR8R, DJ Anna said: "While the songs don't always achieve the depth or scope of, dare I say, a DJ Shadow piece, they do exist as lovely and moving soundscapes, and Omid proves himself to be a technically awesome electronic composer."

The album reached number 3 on CMJ's "Hip-Hop" chart, as well as number 21 on KUCI's "Top 30" chart. Fritz the Cat of Vice included it on the "Top Nine" list in December 2003.

== Track listing ==
All tracks are written by Omid Walizadeh, except "Ways of the World" by Omid Walizadeh, Nikko, and Xololanxinxo.

No.	Title	Length
1.	"The Sad King"	4:44
2.	"At-One-Ment"	4:15
3.	"Musical Chairs"	1:25
4.	"Healing Bassics"	5:15
5.	"Island Covenant"	4:37
6.	"Ease in the Middle Piece"	4:44
7.	"Endymion"	3:52
8.	"Blue Android"	4:28
9.	"Cluster Tech."	4:50
10.	"Shreem"	3:21
11.	"Ways of the World"	3:59
12.	"Live at the Griffith Park Observatory"	5:34

== Personnel ==
Credits adapted from liner notes.

- Omid Walizadeh – production, mixing
- Leila – cello (9)
- Nikko – vocals (11)
- DJ Drez – turntables (11)
- Damon Tedesco – mastering
- Kevin Ramos – photography
- Sid M. Dueñas – design
