= Imaginary Places =

2002 single by Busdriver

Single by Busdriver

from the album Temporary Forever
- Released: 2002
- Genre: Alternative hip hop; experimental hip hop; classical music
- Label: Temporary Whatever
- Songwriter: Busdriver
- Producers: Paris Zax; Daddy Kev; Omid

Busdriver singles chronology
"Imaginary Places" (2002)	"'Avantcore'" (2005)

Imaginary Places is a single by American rapper Busdriver from his album Temporary Forever. It was released in 2002.

== Song information ==
The title track "Imaginary Places" is sampled from "Badinerie" from Johann Sebastian Bach's "Minuet and Badinerie Orchestral Suite No. 2 in B Minor" and the theme from Paganini's 5th Caprice. It is featured in the 2003 video game Tony Hawk's Underground. It is also featured in the viral video " CSS : phoon too much for zblock bunnyhop fragmovie". The song also appeared in The Proud Family: Louder and Prouder episode "Home School."

"Jazz Fingers" features Aceyalone on vocals.

== Track listing ==
1. Imaginary Places (produced by Paris Zax)
2. Mindcrossings (produced by Daddy Kev)
3. Jazz Fingers (produced by Omid)
