= Young Dangerous Heart (Subtitle album) =

Studio album by Subtitle
- Released: February 22, 2005
- Genre: Hip-hop
- Length: 59:21
- Label: Gold Standard Laboratories
- Producer: Subtitle; Alias; Omid; Thavius Beck; Cockamamie; Old Joseph; Life Rexall; Deeskee; Octavius; Headphone Science

Subtitle chronology
I'm Always Recovering from Tomorrow (2003)	Young Dangerous Heart (2005)	Terrain to Roam (2006)

Young Dangerous Heart is the first studio album by American rapper Subtitle. It was released on Gold Standard Laboratories on February 22, 2005.

== Production ==
Initially, Subtitle created the other version of the album that he solely produced. In a 2020 interview, he recalled, "The dudes from Gold Standard weren't into it because it went all over the place, production-wise and they needed a more cohesive project to release on a semi-large scale." He released that version himself, under the title Lost Love Stays Lost. For two thirds of Young Dangerous Heart, he got an outside production. He recalled, "As a result, I wrote better songs and the outside production made me step my beat game up, which gave me some type of credibility as a producer of some sort." His main sonic influences for the album were Slum Village's Fan-Tas-Tic (Vol. 1), Sonic Youth's Washing Machine, and Kanye West's College Dropout, as well as the Mars Volta.

== Critical reception ==
Professional ratings
Review scores
Source	Rating
Pitchfork	7.3/10
PopMatters	7/10 stars
Splendid	mixed
Tiny Mix Tapes	2/5 marks

Stefan Braidwood of PopMatters gave the album 7 out of 10 stars, commenting that Subtitle is "certainly forging his own territory, and, more than a deep voice, R&B collabos, or plat pop appeal, that's what hip-hop is about. Brian Howe of Pitchfork gave the album a 7.3 out of 10, writing, "Regardless of its merits and flaws, Subtitle's full-length debut confirms the arrival of a rap innovator in the tradition of Kool Keith, MF Doom, Doseone, and Missy Elliott; naturally, attempts to pigeonhole him end in futility."

== Track listing ==
No.	Title	Producer(s)	Length
1.	"Intro"	Subtitle	0:49
2.	"Gio-Graph-Ick"	Alias	4:23
3.	"Leave Home"	Omid	4:26
4.	"Palm Fronds"	Subtitle	2:12
5.	"Young Dangerous Heart"	Thavius Beck	3:42
6.	"Fast Food/Fast Death"	Cockamamie	4:19
7.	"Cray Crazy" (featuring Busdriver, Nocando, and Aceyalone)	Thavius Beck	5:05
8.	"Subtalk"	Old Joseph	2:48
9.	"Where To"	Subtitle	4:03
10.	"Con-Contrived (I'm Not)"	Life Rexall	3:06
11.	"Serial Boxes"	Subtitle	4:19
12.	"I Feel Nothing"	Deeskee	2:08
13.	"Springtime in Rufferdam"	Subtitle	2:24
14.	"Killer Drones on Street"	Octavius	3:10
15.	"Organichemico"	Headphone Science	2:45
16.	"Crew Cut (for Sale)" (featuring Nocando, 2Mex, LMNO, Existereo, Luckyiam, Awol One, Murs, Life Rexall, and Busdriver)	Subtitle	8:22
17.	"Outro"	Subtitle	1:22
Total length:			59:21
