= Memoirs of the Elephant Man =

Studio album by Busdriver
- Released: October 12, 1999
- Recorded: 1999
- Genre: Alternative hip-hop
- Length: 67:44
- Labels: Temporary Whatever; Afterlife Recordz
- Producer: C.V.E.

Busdriver chronology
Memoirs of the Elephant Man (1999)	Temporary Forever (2002)

Professional ratings
Review scores
Source	Rating
The Encyclopedia of Popular Music	3/5 stars
Philadelphia Weekly	C+

Memoirs of the Elephant Man is the debut album by the American rapper Busdriver. It was released in 1999 on Temporary Whatever. It was rereleased in 2001.

== Critical reception ==
Cincinnati CityBeat called the album "exquisitely weird and wonderfully heavy."

== Track listing ==
No.	Title	Length
1.	"Memoirs Intro"	1:17
2.	"Never Bite the Hand That Feeds You"	3:09
3.	"I Won't Dance" (feat. Riddlore?)	3:51
4.	"Driving Under the Influence"	2:57
5.	"Overshadow"	4:13
6.	"Painkillers" (feat. Chu-Chu)	4:15
7.	"Most Likely"	4:31
8.	"Blank Space"	1:16
9.	"L.A. Czars" (feat. 2Mex)	3:37
10.	"They Don't Know"	4:19
11.	"Night of the Living Dead" (feat. Ngafsh)	3:19
12.	"Mythic Proportions" (feat. Eva of Figures of Speech)	0:44
13.	"Everybody's Styling"	4:16
14.	"Think Different"	4:57
15.	"Get on the Bus" (feat. Abstract Rude)	4:08
16.	"Clean Break"	4:43
17.	"Walking Dead" (feat. 2Mex)	4:05
18.	"Party Pooper"	3:59
19.	"Buy One Style, Get Second Style Free" (feat. DJ Drez)	4:08
