= Sweat Lodge Infinite =

Studio album by 2Mex
- Released: October 21, 2003
- Recorded: 2002–2003
- Genre: Alternative hip-hop
- Length: 45:19
- Label: Temporary Whatever
- Producer: Logevity

2Mex chronology
B-Boys in Occupied Mexico (2001)	Sweat Lodge Infinite (2003)	2Mex (2004)

Sweat Lodge Infinite is a solo studio album by American rapper 2Mex. It was released on Temporary Whatever in 2003. Entirely produced by Longevity, it features guest appearances from Aceyalone, Busdriver, Kemit, Existereo, Liferexall, St. Mark 9:23, and Awol One.

== Critical reception ==
Professional ratings
Review scores
Source	Rating
Dusted Magazine	favorable
Exclaim!	mixed
PopMatters	mixed
Prefix	5.0/10
XLR8R	favorable

David Morris of PopMatters gave the album a mixed review, saying, "2Mex falls short of bringing truly next level shit, but he's really doing his damnedest, and there's definite pleasure to be had in hearing him reach." Thomas Quinlan of Exclaim! called it "a good album with a nice unified sound." He stated that "Longevity's production is primarily minimal drum-programming and unusual sound effects, while Mixmaster Wolf layers plenty of scratches that give the tracks more depth." Dave Segal of XLR8R wrote: "From the militant first track, 'Obey,' with its grandiose horn stabs, scratches from Breakestra's Mixmaster Wolf, and hypnotic organ riff, 2Mex thrusts you into the apocalyptic funkiness and exhilarating existentialism of golden-era crews like Public Enemy, X Clan and Poor Righteous Teachers."

== Track listing ==
No.	Title	Length
1.	"Obey"	3:09
2.	"Seconds Ago"	3:01
3.	"Pavilions of Sound"	3:46
4.	"3 or 13" (featuring Aceyalone)	3:48
5.	"Instead of Going Out"	4:20
6.	"Copy That" (featuring Busdriver and Kemit)	3:30
7.	"Before the Format"	2:39
8.	"M.A.S.H." (featuring Busdriver, Existereo, and Kemit)	4:24
9.	"In the No"	3:46
10.	"Skit"	3:15
11.	"Lightpost 2 Lightpost" (featuring Liferexall and St. Mark 9:23)	3:32
12.	"No Category" (featuring Aceyalone and Awol One)	4:25
13.	"Outro"	1:43
Total length:		45:19

== Personnel ==
Credits adapted from liner notes.

- 2Mex – vocals
- Longevity – additional vocals, production
- Aceyalone – vocals (4, 12)
- Busdriver – vocals (6, 8)
- Kemit – vocals (6, 8)
- Existereo – vocals (8)
- Liferexall – vocals (11)
- St. Mark 9:23 – vocals (11)
- Awol One – vocals (12)
- Mixmaster Wolf – turntables
- Daddy Kev – mixing
