= Temporary Forever =

Studio album by Busdriver
- Released: 2002
- Genre: Hip-hop
- Length: 63:55
- Label: Temporary Whatever
- Producers: Cerebro; Daddy Kev; Paris Zax; O.D.; Busdriver; Conartist; Marques Broadwell; Hive

Busdriver chronology
Memoirs of the Elephant Man (1999)	Temporary Forever (2002)	Cosmic Cleavage (2004)

Singles from Temporary Forever
- 1. "Imaginary Places" Released: 2002

Temporary Forever is the second studio album by American rapper Busdriver. It was released on Temporary Whatever in 2002. It features guest appearances from Radioinactive, Rhetoric, Of Mexican Descent, and Aceyalone. Most of the tracks were recorded and mixed by Daddy Kev, who is a co-executive producer of the album. All scratching on the album was done by D-Styles.

== Critical reception ==
Professional ratings
Review scores
Source	Rating
AllMusic	4/5 stars
CMJ New Music Monthly	favorable
Exclaim!	favorable
Urban Smarts	84/100

John Bush of AllMusic gave the album 4 stars out of 5, saying, "the album has so many incredible ideas and catchy riffs that it trumps entire careers by some rappers out there." He added, "Temporary Forever introduces one of the most imaginative talents to ever grace the rap world."

In 2008, Vibe included it on the "24 Lost Rap Classics" list. Sean Fennessey wrote, "his adenoidal flow, a breathless bundle of consonants and exclamation points, will challenge anyone looking to tune the MC out."

In 2015, HipHopDX included it on the "30 Best Underground Hip Hop Albums Since 2000" list.

== Track listing ==
No.	Title	Producer(s)	Length
1.	"New Aquarium"	Cerebro; Daddy Kev	1:07
2.	"Imaginary Places"	Paris Zax	3:15
3.	"Along Came a Biter"	Paris Zax	4:05
4.	"Idle Chatter"	O.D.	3:38
5.	"Gun Control"	Paris Zax	3:11
6.	"Mindcrossings"	Daddy Kev	2:56
7.	"Suing Sony"	Daddy Kev	2:46
8.	"Stylin' Under Pressure"	Busdriver	2:20
9.	"Single Cell Ego"	Daddy Kev	2:39
10.	"Somethingness" (featuring Radioinactive and Rhetoric)	Conartist	6:08
11.	"Driver's Manual"	Daddy Kev	0:50
12.	"The Truth of Spontaneous Human Combustion" (featuring Of Mexican Descent)	Marques Broadwell	4:39
13.	"Opposable Thumbs"	Paris Zax	4:43
14.	"Unplanned Parenthood"	Paris Zax	1:44
15.	"Jazz Fingers" (featuring Aceyalone)	O.D.	4:34
16.	"Reality Sandwich"	Hive	4:14
17.	"Wrong Route"	Cerebro; Daddy Kev	1:03
18.	"Post Apocalyptic Rap Blues"	Paris Zax	10:04
Total length:			63:55

== Personnel ==
Technical personnel

- Daddy Kev – mastering
