= 10 Haters =

Studio album by Flash Bang Grenada
- Released: August 23, 2011
- Genre: Hip-hop
- Length: 42:33
- Label: Hellfyre Club
- Producers: Dibiase; Nosaj Thing; Busdriver; Mexicans with Guns; E. Super; Mono/Poly; Free the Robots; Shlohmo; Blocade

10 Haters is the debut studio album by American hip-hop duo Flash Bang Grenada. It was released on Hellfyre Club on August 23, 2011.

== Background ==
The albums includes guest appearances from Open Mike Eagle and Del the Funky Homosapien, as well as productions from the likes of Dibiase, Nosaj Thing, Mexicans with Guns, Shlohmo, and Blocade.

== Critical reception ==
Professional ratings
Review scores
Source	Rating
Potholes in My Blog	2/5 stars
URB	3.5/5 stars

Brett Uddenberg of URB gave the album 3.5 stars out of 5, describing it as "a showcase of two of the west coast's wittier spitters stepping into a vocal booth and polishing their collective smirk into some bizarre gems." Jeff Weiss of Los Angeles Times called it "a smart, subversive swag-rap record."

It was included on Pitchfork's year-end "Overlooked Mixtapes" list, as well as Alarm's "50 Unheralded Albums from 2011" list.

== Track listing ==
No.	Title	Producer(s)	Length
1.	"Good Cop, Bad Cop"	Dibiase	3:51
2.	"Beat My Bitch"	Nosaj Thing	5:03
3.	"I Can Teleport"	Busdriver	3:52
4.	"Moisturizer"	Mexicans with Guns	3:44
5.	"Aphrodite"	E. Super	4:19
6.	"Bernie"	Busdriver	3:06
7.	"In a Perfect World" (featuring Open Mike Eagle)	Mono/Poly	4:50
8.	"10 Haters"	Free the Robots	3:50
9.	"Hyperbolic" (featuring Del the Funky Homosapien)	Shlohmo	5:51
10.	"Jimmy"	Blocade	4:07
