= Flash Bang Grenada =

American rapper

- Origin: Los Angeles, California
- Genres: Hip hop
- Years active: 2011–present
- Label: Hellfyre Club
- Members: Busdriver; Nocando

Flash Bang Grenada is an American hip hop duo based in Los Angeles, California. It consists of Busdriver and Nocando.

== History ==
Flash Bang Grenada released the debut album, 10 Haters, on Hellfyre Club in 2011. It featured vocal contributions from Open Mike Eagle and Del the Funky Homosapien. It was chosen by Alarm as one of the 50 Unheralded Albums from 2011.

== Discography ==
Albums

- 10 Haters (2011)
