= Mystic Chords of Memory =

US musical group

- Origin: United States
- Genre: Alternative rock
- Years active: 2004–present
- Labels: Rough Trade records Mush Records
- Members: Christopher Gunst; Jen Cohen

Mystic Chords of Memory is an American alternative rock duo consisting of Christopher Gunst of Beachwood Sparks and Jen Cohen of The Aislers Set.

== History ==
Mystic Chords of Memory released their self-titled debut album, Mystic Chords of Memory, on Rough Trade Records in 2004.

The band also released Tree Colored See, a collaborative album with Nobody, on Mush Records in 2006.

== Name ==
The phrase mystic chords of memory appears in the last paragraph of Abraham Lincoln's first inaugural address.

== Discography ==
=== Studio albums ===
- Mystic Chords of Memory (2004)

=== Collaborative albums ===
- Tree Colored See (2006) with Nobody

=== Singles ===
- "Broaden a New Sound" (2006) with Nobody
