= Rap Album One =

Studio album by Jonwayne
- Released: October 29, 2013
- Genre: Hip-hop
- Length: 38:13
- Label: Stones Throw
- Producers: Jonwayne; Scoop DeVille

Jonwayne chronology
Oodles of Doodles (2012)	Rap Album One (2013)	Jonwayne Is Retired (2015)

Rap Album One is the third studio album by American hip-hop artist Jonwayne. It was released on October 29, 2013, on Stones Throw Records. Music videos were created for "The Come Up" and "How to Be a Gemini."

== Critical reception ==
Professional ratings
Aggregate scores
Source	Rating
Metacritic	74/100
Review scores
Source	Rating
AllMusic	4/5 stars
Clash	7/10
Exclaim!	7/10
Fact	4/5 stars
HipHopDX	3.5/5 stars
Pitchfork	6.0/10
Potholes in My Blog	3.5/5 stars
Spectrum Culture	3/5 stars

At Metacritic, which assigns a weighted average score out of 100 to reviews from mainstream critics, the album received an average score of 74, based on 8 reviews, indicating "generally favorable reviews".

Del F. Cowie of Exclaim! gave the album a 7 out of 10, commenting that "Jonwayne's flow is verbose, cerebral and free-associative by nature; toss in the gruff delivery, and the MF Doom comparisons are inevitable." Kyle Kramer of Pitchfork gave the album a 6.0 out of 10, saying, "His sound is minimal, in many cases relying on just piano and subdued drum pattern—live he uses just a sampler and a mic—which works to vivid effect."

Laurent Fintoni of Fact praised the album as "the sound of an artist who's finally found some balance between his rapper and producer halves." In January 2014, it was named the Worldwide Winner of Album of the Year by British radio and club DJ Gilles Peterson. Max Bell of LA Weekly also called it "one of the best rap albums of the year".

== Track listing ==
No.	Title	Producer(s)	Length
1.	"After the Calm"	Jonwayne	4:36
2.	"You Can Love Me When I'm Dead"	Jonwayne	3:58
3.	"Find Me in the Future"	Jonwayne	2:48
4.	"The Come Up Pt. 1" (featuring Scoop DeVille)	Jonwayne	2:44
5.	"The Come Up Pt. 2"	Scoop DeVille	2:22
6.	"Yung Grammar"	Jonwayne	2:55
7.	"Reflection"	Jonwayne	4:50
8.	"Zeroh's Song"	Jonwayne	3:55
9.	"How to Be a Gemini"	Jonwayne	3:00
10.	"Black Magic"	Scoop DeVille	3:03
11.	"Sandals"	Jonwayne	4:03

== Personnel ==
Credits adapted from the album's liner notes.

- Jonwayne – vocals, production (tracks 1–4, 6–9, 11), recording
- D-Styles – turntables (track 2)
- Scoop DeVille – additional vocals (track 4), production (tracks 5, 10)
- Zeroh – additional vocals (track 8), additional keyboards (track 8)
- Mndsgn – additional keyboards (track 11)
- Daddy Kev – mixing, mastering
- Jeff Jank – design
- Theo Jemison – photography
