= Omid Walizadeh =

- Also known as: Omid, OD
- Born: Chicago, Illinois
- Origin: Long Beach, California
- Genres: Instrumental hip-hop, alternative hip-hop
- Occupation: Producer
- Instruments: Sampler, synthesizer
- Years active: 1998-present
- Labels: Beneath the Surface; Mush Records; Alpha Pup Records
- Website: Omid Walizadeh on SoundCloud

Omid Walizadeh, also known as Omid or OD, is a hip-hop producer based in Long Beach, California. He has produced tracks for the likes of Freestyle Fellowship, Busdriver, 2Mex, Subtitle, and Awol One.

== History ==
Omid Walizadeh graduated from Loyola Marymount University with a bachelor's degree in recording arts. He has produced tracks since 1992.

Inspired by the underground hip-hop movement at the Good Life Cafe in the early 1990s, he released a collaborative album, Beneath the Surface, in 1998. It featured over 30 rappers, mainly from Los Angeles.

His solo debut album, Distant Drummer, was released on Beneath the Surface in 2002. It was inspired by Dan Simmons' novel Hyperion, the music of Sun Ra, among other things.

In 2003, he released the album, Monolith, on Mush Records. It featured contributions from the likes of Abstract Rude, 2Mex, Buck 65, Luckyiam, Aceyalone, Murs, and Slug. The title comes from Arthur C. Clarke's novel 2010: Odyssey Two.

In 2007, he released the instrumental album, Afterwords 3, on Alpha Pup Records.

He is the music supervisor of This Is the Life, a documentary film which chronicles the Good Life Cafe.

In 2013, he returned with Modern Persian Speech Sounds.

== Style and influences ==
In a 2003 interview, Omid Walizadeh talked about his music making process: "90% of my music is sample based, but I tweek and rearrange and change the samples to my bidding. Just taking a note here and a drum hit there and creating a whole different arrangement."

He uses an Ensoniq ASR-10, Yamaha CS1x, and Pro Tools.

== Discography ==
=== Albums ===
- Beneath the Surface (1998)
- Distant Drummer (2002)
- Monolith (2003)
- Afterwords 3 (2007)
- Modern Persian Speech Sounds (2013)

=== Singles ===
- "Percussion Precaution" b/w "Rush" (2002)

=== Productions ===
- Busdriver - "Overshadow" from Memoirs of the Elephant Man (1999)
- Self Jupiter - "OD's Swing" "It Was on This Night" "When the Sun Took a Day Off and the Moon Stood Still" from Hard Hat Area (2000)
- Scarub - "Savvy Traveler" from Heavenbound (2000)
- Radioinactive - "Una Cosa" from Pyramidi (2001)
- 2Mex - "Percussion Percaution" "Offering" from B-Boys in Occupied Mexico (2001)
- Busdriver - "Jazz Fingers" from Temporary Forever (2002)
- Sach - "Illustrations (Remix)" from Suckas Hate Me (2002)
- Freestyle Fellowship - "Can You Find the Level of Difficulty in This?" "Got You on the Run" "Desperate" "Once Again" from Shockadoom (2002)
- Neila - "Unintentional Violence" from Vertical Trees with Eternal Leaves (2003)
- Writer's Block - "Sunset Limited" "Situations" from En Route (2004)
- Neila - "Rules" "Operating Instructions" from For Whom the Bells Crow (2004)
- Awol One - "Memowrecks" from Self Titled (2004)
- Sach - Sach 5th Ave (2004)
- 2Mex - "Alive-A-Cation" "Only As Good As Goodbye" "The Return of Fernandomania" "Ghost Memo" "Escape the Toyota Matrix" from 2Mex (2004)
- Busdriver - "Reheated Pop!" from Fear of a Black Tangent (2005)
- Subtitle - "Leave Home" from Young Dangerous Heart (2005)
- SonGodSuns - "Minors into Fire" from Over the Counter Culture (2005)
- Ellay Khule - "Califormula Mix" "Needle Skipping" "Fading Rhythms" "Very Latest Styles" "Time" "Call Me Khule" from Califormula (2005)
- Escape Artists - "E Pur Si Muove" from EA3 (2005)
- Subtitle - "Let's Get Lit" from Terrain to Roam (2006)
- Acid Reign - "Comfort Zone" from Time & Change (2006)
- Busdriver - "Me-Time (With the Pulmonary Palimpsest)" "Unsafe Sextet/Gilded Hearts of Booklovers" from Jhelli Beam (2009)
- Friday Night - "Friday Night Fever (Omid Remix)" from Friday Night Remixed (2010)
- Nomadee - "Forever" from Daydreams (2011)
- Freestyle Fellowship - "Introduction" "This Write Here" from The Promise (2011)
- Thirsty Fish - "Home Movies" (2012)
