= Jonwayne =

American rapper (born 1990)

- Born: Jonathan Wayne; June 5, 1990 (age 36); La Habra, California, U.S.
- Genre: Hip-hop
- Occupations: Rapper; record producer
- Instrument: Sampler
- Years active: 2008–present
- Labels: Alpha Pup; Leaving; Stones Throw; Authors Recording Company; The Order Label
- Website: jwayniac.bandcamp.com

Hand-drawn portrait of Jonwayne

Jonathan Wayne (born June 5, 1990), better known by his stage name Jonwayne, is an American rapper and record producer.

== Early life ==
Jonwayne was born in La Habra, California on June 5, 1990. He is a descendant of American Revolutionary War General "Mad" Anthony Wayne, from whom actor John Wayne took his stage name.

== Career ==
Jonwayne briefly worked as a stage actor after high school. Through these activities, he developed a crush on a girl who was interested in poetry; he then began writing his own poetry in order to impress her and quickly found a passion for it. Jonwayne's love of poetry led to his involvement in hip-hop at 17 years old when a rap group from West Covina began bringing their equipment to a Young Artists Workshop that he attended. In early 2009, he began frequenting Low End Theory, the Los Angeles club event where he would meet his friend and mentor, Dibiase. By 2010, he had booked his first gig at Low End Theory and became one of the youngest artists ever to perform there. He came to the attention of Stones Throw Records head Peanut Butter Wolf when the two were on the same bill at a benefit show at Low End Theory in 2010.

He released his debut album, the instrumental Bowser, on Alpha Pup Records in 2011. In that year, he also released a mixtape, I Don't Care. It was included on Pitchfork's "Overlooked Mixtapes" list. His 48-track instrumental album, Oodles of Doodles, was released on Stones Throw Records in 2012. In that year, he also released a mixtape, This Is False.

He has released a series of mixtapes, Cassette in 2012 followed by Cassette 2 and Cassette 3: The Marion Morrison Mixtape in 2013. The artwork for each mixtape mimicked the trade dress of recognizable products: a pack of Marlboro cigarettes (Cassette), a can of Coca-Cola (Cassette 2), and a first generation iPod (Cassette 3). In 2013, Philip Morris USA sent a cease and desist letter to Stones Throw, alleging that the design of Cassette infringed its trademark in the Marlboro packaging design. Stones Throw agreed to stop producing anymore copies of Cassette, noting that they were "just about out of tapes anyway." "Cool Runnings", a track from Cassette 2, was included on Drowned in Sound's "Top Tracks" list in April 2013.

He released Rap Album One in 2013, and Rap Album Two in 2017.

== Personal life ==
Jonwayne is currently based in Southern California.

== Discography ==
=== Studio albums ===
- Bowser (2011)
- Oodles of Doodles (2012)
- Rap Album One (2013)
- Here You Go (2015)
- Rap Album Two (2017)

=== Compilation albums ===
- Cassette on Vinyl (2014)

=== Mixtapes ===
- From the Vaults Pt. 1 (2008)
- From the Vaults Pt. 2 (2008)
- From the Vaults Pt. 3 (2009)
- From the Vaults Pt. 4 (2009)
- Thanks Bro (2011)
- I Don't Care (2011)
- This Is False (2012)
- Cassette (2012)
- Cassette 2 (2013)
- Cassette 3: The Marion Morrison Mixtape (2013)
- Yuletide Bangerz (2018)

=== EPs ===
- The Death of Andrew (2012)
- Jonwayne Fucks Disney (2012)
- Jonwayne Is Retired (2015)

=== Singles ===
- "Uh Oh" (2012) (with Jonti)
- "Wonka" (2016)
- "That's O.K." (2016)
- "Jump Shot" (2016)
- "40 Winks" (2016)
- "Out of Sight" (2017)
- "TED Talk" (2017)
- "Last Last Fall" (2018)

=== Guest appearances ===
- Groundislava - "Shlava" from Groundislava (2011)
- Quakers - "Smoke" from Quakers (2012)
- Jonti - "Red on Green" from Sine & Moon (2012)
- Free the Robots - "2040" from The Balance (2013)
- Mo Kolours - "Tears, Sand & Thorns" (2016)
- Samiyam - "What Can I Do" from Pizza Party (2017)
- Evidence - "To Make a Long Story Longer" from Weather or Not (2018)
- Dabrye - "Pretty" from Three/Three (2018)
- Beak - "There's No One" from L.A. Playback (2018)
- Zeroh - "Stratus.Quo" from 0 Emissions (2019)

=== Productions ===
- Homeboy Sandman - "Unforgettable" from Subject: Matter (2012)
- Homeboy Sandman - "Rain" and "Not Really" from First of a Living Breed (2012)
- Jeremiah Jae - "Seventy 8" from Bad Jokes (2013)
- Jeremiah Jae - "Making Shit" from Good Times (2014)
- Homeboy Sandman - "America, the Beautiful" and "Refugee" from Hallways (2014)
- Homeboy Sandman - "Heart Sings” from Kindness For Weakness (2016)
- Danny Watts - Black Boy Meets World (2017)
- Your Old Droog - “Listen (Jonwayne Remix)” from Looseys (2018)
- Your Old Droog - “The Man On the Moon” from Yodney Dangerfield (2022)

== Filmography ==
- The Eric Andre Show - Episode: "Lance Reddick; Harry Shum Jr." (2013)

== Books ==
- Line Segments (2016)
