= K-the-I??? =

American rapper

- Born: Kiki Ceac; Cambridge, Massachusetts, U.S.
- Origin: Los Angeles, California, U.S.
- Genres: Alternative hip-hop, underground hip-hop
- Occupations: Rapper, producer
- Years active: 2002-present
- Labels: Mush Records, Fake Four Inc, Big Dada, Backwoodz Records
- Website: soundcloud.com/k-the-i

Kiki Ceac, better known by his stage name K-the-I???, is an American rapper and producer based in Los Angeles, California and currently signed to Fake Four Inc.

== History ==
K-the-I??? began recording in 2002. He released several small-issue records before signing with Mush Records in 2006. His debut for the label, Broken Love Letter, was primarily self-produced. The follow-up, Yesterday, Today & Tomorrow, was produced by Thavius Beck and arrived in 2008. The album was released on Big Dada in the UK. Yesterday, Today & Tomorrow featured several guest rappers, including Busdriver and Nocando.

== Discography ==
=== Albums ===
- Teletron 1 (2003)
- Fair Weather Under the Surface Negative (2004)
- Broken Love Letter (2006)
- Yesterday, Today & Tomorrow (2008)
- Synthesthesia (2011)
- The Blueprint Of A Paper Airplane / Like Dust (Split with Walter Gross) (2013)
- Genuine Dexterity (Split with Kenny Segal) (2024)

=== EPs ===
- Yung Planetz EP (2012) (with Bleubird & Sole, as Waco Boyz)

=== Guest appearances ===
- The Train Rawbers - "Astroturf" on The Train Rawbers (2004)
- Nephlim Modulation Systems - "Hold the Atmosphere" from Imperial Letters of Protection (2005)
- Scott Da Ros - "Ocean Splits in Half" "Silence + Circles" from One Kind of Dead End (2006)
- DJ Mayonnaise - "Strateegery" on Still Alive (2007)
- Noah23 - "Tragic Comedy" on Rock Paper Scissors (2008)
- Loden - "Radio" on "Self-Aware Wolf" b/w "Radio" (2010)
- Sole - "Hustle Hard" on Nuclear Winter Volume 2: Death Panel (2011)
- OptimisGFN - "Cambridge's Finest" on Young Whipper Snapper (2015)
