= Subtitle (rapper) =

American rapper

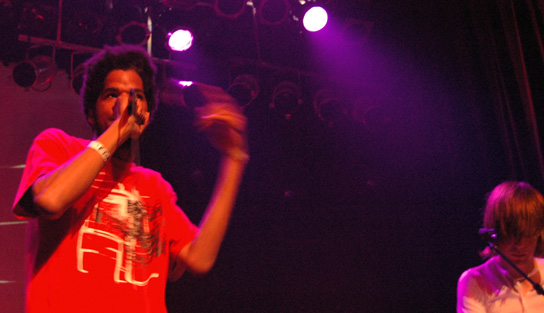
- Subtitle in 2014

Background information
- Born: Giovanni Marks; October 2, 1978 (age 47); Queens, New York, United States
- Origin: Los Angeles, California
- Genres: Alternative hip-hop, underground hip-hop Jazz rap
- Occupations: Rapper, producer
- Years active: 1998–present
- Labels: Alpha Pup Records; Gold Standard Laboratories

Giovanni Marks (born October 2, 1978), better known by his stage name Subtitle, is a rapper and producer based in Los Angeles, California. He is one half of the duo Lab Waste alongside Thavius Beck. He has also collaborated with other artists such as K-the-I???, Busdriver and Islands.

== Career ==
Subtitle released an EP entitled I'm Always Recovering from Tomorrow in 2003 and an album entitled Young Dangerous Heart in 2005, both on the label Gold Standard Laboratories. His group Lab Waste (with Thavius Beck) released an album, Zwarte Achtegrond, at the beginning of that year.

October 2006 saw the release of Terrain to Roam, an album which featured production from Daddy Kev, Daedelus, Thavius Beck, Omid, Nobody, Paris Zax, Madlib, Dntel, Crunc Tesla, and Small Is Beautiful among others.

== Discography ==
=== Albums ===
- Analog Gut (1998)
- How 2 Beat the Beat 1 & 2 (1998)
- Weekend Science 1 & 2 (1999) (with Mum's the Word)
- Delete the Elite (2001)
- Lost Love Stays Lost (2004)
- Young Dangerous Heart (2005)
- Zwarte Achtegrond (2005) (with Thavius Beck, as Lab Waste)
- Terrain to Roam (2006)
- Marks in Angles (2007)
- Double Tech Jeep Music (2015)
- FALL ALL OVER/DEAD OCTOBER (2020)

=== EPs ===
- I'm Always Recovering from Tomorrow (2003)

=== Singles ===
- "Young Dangerous Heart / Palm Fronds / The Haze on the Hill" (2005)

=== Guest appearances ===
- The Mind Clouders - "Upside Down 6" from Fake It Until You Make It (1999)
- Antimc - "Shake, Rattle, Rattle" from Run (2003)
- Thavius Beck - "June Gloom" from Decomposition (2004)
- Scream Club - "What You Gonna Do?" from Don't Bite Your Sister (2004)
- Existereo - "Work Related" from Crush Groove (2004)
- North American Hallowe'en Prevention Initiative - "Do They Know It's Hallowe'en?" (2005)
- Bleubird - "Everything Up" from Pilgrim of St. Zotique (2006)
- Islands - "Where There's a Will There's a Whalebone" from Return to the Sea (2006)
- Daedelus - "Unadventurer" from Throw a Fit (2006)
- Vyle - "Tech" from Oh I Think Dey Like Hoodtronics (2006)
- Kay the Aquanaut - "To the Last Drop" from Spinning Blue Planet (2007)
- Joe Dub - "LA2theBay" from Pooretry (2007)
- Depth Affect - "Street Level" from Hero Crisis (2008)
- K-the-I??? - "Stylin'" from Yesterday, Today & Tomorrow (2008)
- Self Jupiter & Kenny Segal - "Altered States" from The Kleenrz (2012)
- Senz Beats - "Raw Forces" and "After the Storm" from Tilting at Windmills (2013)
- Drummachinemike - "Sound Investments" from Drum Machine Music (2014)

=== Productions ===
- Daedelus - "Dumbfound (Subtitle Remix)" from "Something Bells" (2004)
- SonGodSuns - "Interruption from the Lie Love You" from Over the Counter Culture (2005)
- Noah23 - "Give It to the People" from Rock Paper Scissors (2008)
- Sole and the Skyrider Band - "Nothing Is Free" from Sole and the Skyrider Band Remix LP (2009)
- Thavius Beck - "Sheepish" from Dialogue (2009)
- Isaiah Toothtaker - "Pressure", "On the Outies", and "Still Ill" from Yiggy (2010)
