= Hellfyre Club =

American alternative hip hop record label

- Founded: 2011
- Founder: Nocando
- Status: Active
- Genre: Alternative hip hop
- Country of origin: U.S.
- Location: Los Angeles, California
- Official website: hellfyreclub.bandcamp.com

Hellfyre Club is an American independent record label based in Los Angeles, California. It was founded and is currently owned by rapper Nocando.

According to Pitchfork Media, it is "an assemblage of West Coast art rap luminaries connected to Project Blowed, a long-running hip hop workshop that served as a proving ground for 90s and aughts L.A. aesthetes from Freestyle Fellowship and Abstract Rude to Pigeon John."

== History ==
Hellfyre Club released Prometheus, a label compilation mixed by DJ Nobody, in March 2011. Another compilation, Veneris Nigrum, followed in November that year. It featured contributions from E.Super, Kail, Subtitle, Rheteric Ramirez, Open Mike Eagle, Pistol McFly, Sahtyre, Nocando, and VerBS. Dorner vs. Tookie, a 17-track compilation, was released on the label in November 2013.

On May 2, 2017, the label released its first project in nearly three years with "The Live I Live" EP by Cadalack Ron.

== Roster ==
- Nocando
- Kail

=== Former ===
- Falcons
- Intuition
- Pistol McFly
- Subtitle
- E.Super (Alpha MC, Alwayz Prolific, Duke Westlake, and Kuest 1)
- Flash Bang Grenada (Busdriver and Nocando)
- Kail
- Milo
- Rheteric Ramirez
- Taurus Scott
- VerBS
- Open Mike Eagle
- Busdriver
- Anderson .Paak

== Discography ==
- Prometheus (2011)
- Veneris Nigrum (2011)
- Dorner vs. Tookie (2013)

== See also ==
- List of record labels
- Underground hip hop
