= 2Mex =

American rapper (born 1973)

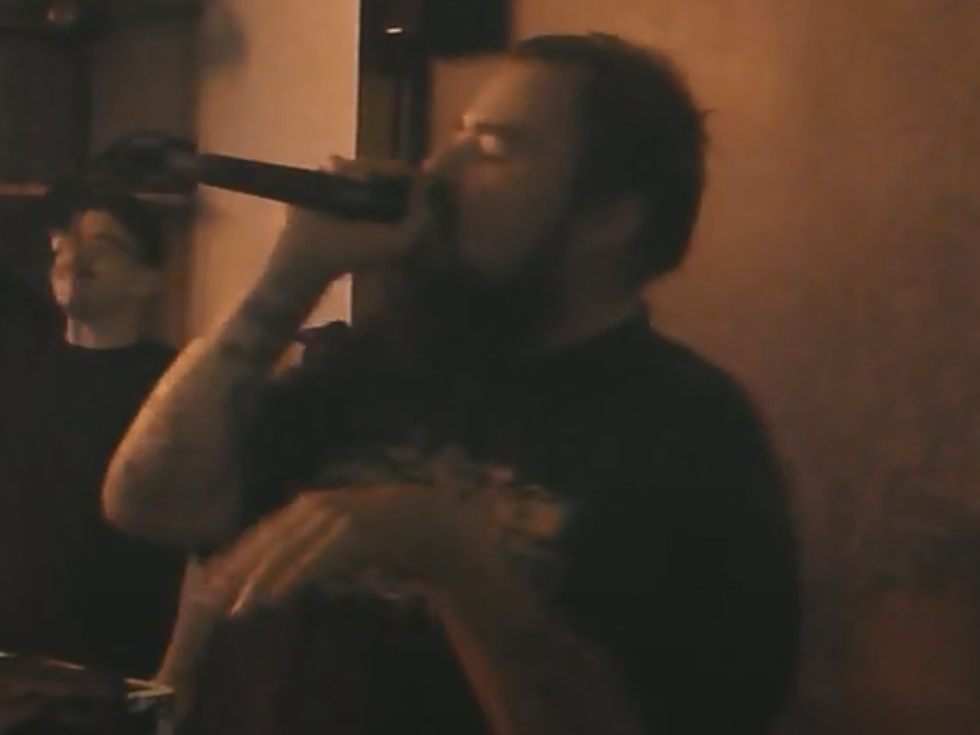
- Ocana performing in 2012

Background information
- Born: Alejandro Ocana; 1973 (age 52–53)
- Origin: Los Angeles, California, United States
- Genres: Alternative hip-hop Underground hip-hop
- Occupation: Rapper
- Years active: 1992–present
- Labels: Memo Records; Afterlife Records; Mean Street; Temporary Whatever; Paladin Creative Super Co. Strange Famous Records
- Member of: Visionaries; Of Mexican Descent; The Mind Clouders; SonGodSuns; $martyr; Look Daggers; The Returners

Alejandro Ocana (born in 1973), better known by his stage name 2Mex, is an American rapper. He is a member of Visionaries and Of Mexican Descent. He has collaborated with underground hip-hop artists such as Jel, Omid, Thavius Beck, Factor Chandelier, Radioinactive, and Isaiah "Ikey" Owens.

== History ==
2Mex attended the Good Life Cafe open mic nights in 1992, which played a significant role in shaping his early career. In 1998, he released his first album with Visionaries, as well as the debut album for Of Mexican Descent. He was also featured on the Omid compilation album Beneath the Surface.

In 1999, 2Mex was featured (along with Xololanxinxo as Of Mexican Descent) on the Fat Jack compilation album Cater to the DJ. That same year, he released his first solo album, Fake It Till You Make It, as part of The Mind Clouders, with producer Mums the Word.

In 2000, 2Mex was featured as a member of the Afterlife Crew on the Afterlife Records compilation Declaration of an Independent. He then released B-Boys in Occupied Mexico on Mean Street in 2001. Sweat Lodge Infinite was released on Temporary Whatever in 2003. The self-titled album, 2Mex, was released in 2004. He released My Fanbase Will Destroy You on Strange Famous Records in 2010. It features guest appearances from Murs, Prince Po, Busdriver and Nobody. In 2016, one of his legs was amputated due to complications from diabetes. He addressed the loss and other struggles in the 2017 album Lospital.

== Discography ==
=== Solo ===
Studio albums

- B-Boys in Occupied Mexico (Mean Street, 2001)
- Sweat Lodge Infinite (Temporary Whatever, 2003)
- 2Mex (Paladin Creative Super Co., 2004)
- Over the Counter Culture (Up Above, 2005) (as SunGodSuns)
- My Fanbase Will Destroy You (Strange Famous, 2010)
- Lospital (Water the Plants, 2017)
- Ghostwriting Songs for God (2021)

Mixtapes and EPs

- Unreleased Hits (Memo, 1998) [mixtape]
- Words. Knot Music. (Memo / Afterlife, 2000) [mixtape]
- The Sweat (2002) [EP]
- Knowhawk (Biofidelic / La2TheBay / Invisible Enemy, 2004) [mixtape]
- Gloria Was a KROQer (Up Above, 2006) [EP]
- Protect and Serve (2010) [mixtape]
- Cartoon Boyfriend (2015) [mixtape]
- Gentrification EP (2018) [EP]

Compilations

- Essential 2Mex Road CD (2005)
- New Wave Chola Road Mix (2006)
- Singles: Volume One (2007)
- Sound Hoarding Vol. 1 (2015)
- Sound Hoarding Vol. 2 (2015)
- Sound Hoarding Vol. 3 (2020)

=== Collaborations ===
Visionaries

Of Mexican Descent (2Mex with Xololanxinxo)

- Exitos y mas exitos EP (1998) [EP]
- Exitos y mas exitos (1998)
- Of Mexican Descent (Demo 1992) (2020) [EP]

Look Daggers (2Mex with Isaiah Owens)

- The Patience EP (2007) [EP]
- Suffer in Style (2008)

Other collaborations

- Fake It Until You Make It (1999) (with Mum's the Word, as The Mind Clouders)
- Money Symbol Martyrs (2006) (with Life Rexall, as $martyr)
- Break Up Your Make Up (2009) (with Deeskee, Die Young & Stacey Dee, as The Returners)
- Blessing in Disguise (2010) (with Key Kool & LMNO)
- Fallin' Angels (2011) (with Nobody, as SonGodSuns)
- Like Farther... Like Sun... (2013) (with Maiselph)
- Operation: Dark Winter December (2020) (with Anu322)

=== Guest appearances ===
- Key-Kool & Rhettmatic – "Visionaries (Stop Actin' Scary)" from Kozmonautz (1995)
- Nobody – "Shades of Orange" from Soulmates (2000)
- Abstract Tribe Unique – "Frisbee" from P.A.I.N.T. (2001)
- Existereo – "Morals" from Dirty Deeds & Dead Flowers (2001)
- Jel vs. 2Mex – "D.I.Y. Partisan" (2002)
- Busdriver & Radioinactive with Daedelus – "Barely Music" from The Weather (2003)
- Dax, Neogen, Dert, Reconcile, Professor Who, Dokument, Chosen1, Griffin, Lazarus, Raphi, Drastic, Propaganda & Macho – "Remember This Day" from Underground Rise, Volume 1: Sunrise/Sunset (2003)
- Omid – "Myth Behind the Man" from Monolith (2003)
- Abstract Tribe Unique – "Flow and Tell" from Showtyme (2003)
- Awol One – "Gagbuster" from Self Titled (2004)
- Shape Shifters – "American Idle" from Was Here (2004)
- Deep Rooted – "Give Thanks" from A New Beginning (2004)
- Subtitle – "Crew Cut (for Sale)" from Young Dangerous Heart (2005)
- Busdriver – "Sphinx's Coonery" from Fear of a Black Tangent (2005)
- Ellay Khule – "Fading Rhythms" from Califormula (2006)
- Prince Po – "Ask Me" from Prettyblack (2006)
- Thavius Beck – "Dedicated to Difficulty" from Thru (2006)
- Mestizo – "Back Wash" from Dream State (2007)
- The Gigantics – "Don't" from Die Already (2008)
- Expedyte feat Louis Logic, Phakt – "Sunny Daze" from Life (2008)
- Ceschi – "Same Old Love Song" (2009)
- Neila – "Mercy Refused" from Better Late Than Never (2009)
- Factor Chandelier – "Mental Illness" from Lawson Graham (2010)
- Radioinactive – "Mint Tea" from The Akashic Record (2013)
- Self Provoked – "Trophies" from [The Propaganda] (2015)
- Sal Crosby & Bons Reeb – "20" (2025)
