= Cyclic Defrost =

Australian magazine

- Cyclic Defrost Issue 16
- Editors: Bob Baker Fish, Chris Downton & Peter Hollo
- Categories: Music magazine
- Publisher: Cyclic Defrost
- Founded: 2002
- Final issue: June 2013 (print)
- Country: Australia
- Based in: Sydney
- Language: English
- Website: www.cyclicdefrost.com
- ISSN: 1832-4835

Cyclic Defrost is an Australian specialist electronic music magazine. It was founded and edited by Sebastian Chan, with current editors Bob Baker Fish, Chris Downton and Peter Hollo. It covers independent electronic music, avant-rock, experimental sound art and left field hip hop.

== History and profile ==
The magazine started as a photocopied zine in 1998, as an offshoot of the weekly Sydney club night Frigid, run by Chan and co-editor/designer Dale Harrison. Chan and Harrison had met at university and edited the university newspaper together. Harrison, now the bass player for Sydney band The Herd, resigned after Issue 12 (October 2005) and was replaced by designer Bim Ricketson. Matthew Levinson joined Chan as editor.

Each issue featured local and international music feature articles. Until Issue 16, comprehensive reviews covering CDs, DVDs and vinyl were also found in the print version of the magazine. After this issue, these continued on the website. The magazine also had a record sleeve design reviews section and a guest cover designer. Past cover designers include Rinzen, Bim Ricketson and Build. The magazine also incorporated a music listening club where CDs were posted to subscribers.

The magazine was published three times a year with a print run of 5000. It was available free in selected record stores and other outlets across Australia distributed by Inertia Distribution. The website contains an archive of the issues in PDF format.

In 2003, Cyclic Defrost, the Australian youth media art festival's noise project and SBS Radio's Alchemy program worked together on a project called Sonic Allsorts which featured non-English speaking music artists. A CD was produced and distributed in the magazine, and the artists were played on SBS Radio.

The National Library of Australia's Pandora Archive project has preserved the Cyclic Defrost website since 2004.

In 2005, the Australian Council for the Arts and Austrade assisted Cyclic Defrost to attend Sónar electronic music festival in Barcelona. A special sampler CD of music from Australian electronic music artists and producers, as well as the magazine itself, were distributed at the conference to help introduce Australian music and publications to overseas audiences.

Cyclic Defrost was chosen as a case study for the [Australia Council's Fuel 4 Arts' Protein project in 2005, based on it receiving a "New Audiences" grant in 2002.

Anna Poletti, in her book Intimate Ephemera: Reading Young Lives in Australian Zine Culture listed Cyclic Defrost as an example of Australian DIY culture, describing it as,

Contemporary Australian DIY culture has an equally strong interest in skill-sharing and development, non-commercial modes of circulation and distribution, and practices of craft and thrift as sources of pleasure and community-building which seek no greater effect than their own existence.

Sound and media artist Shannon O'Neill, writing for RealTime Arts, called the magazine a key participant in Australian music discourse.

In June 2013, after 47 issues, the final print issue was published. The online version remains in publication.

Following Cyclic Defrost's transition to a digital-only magazine in July 2013, Bob Baker Fish, Chris Downton and Peter Hollo assumed editorial duties for the website.
