= Low End Theory =

Music club night in Los Angeles (2006–2018)

Coordinates: 34.073861°N 118.216246°W

- Interactive map of Low End Theory
- Address: 2419 North Broadway
- Location: Lincoln Heights, Los Angeles, California
- Type: Music venue
- Events: Alternative hip hop; electronic

Low End Theory was a weekly experimental hip hop and electronic music club night that took place every Wednesday from 2006 to 2018 at The Airliner in Lincoln Heights, Los Angeles, California.

== History ==
Low End Theory was founded in 2006 by producer and Alpha Pup Records label head Daddy Kev and Project Blowdian All City Jimmy, formerly known as Nocando. The weekly event was named after The Low End Theory, the second studio album by American hip-hop group A Tribe Called Quest. As the "epicenter" of L.A.'s instrumental hip hop and L.A. Beat scene, Low End Theory has become one of the most influential venues for the 'beat music' genre. Long-time resident DJs include Daddy Kev, The Gaslamp Killer, Nobody, and D-Styles.

"L.A.'s monolithic weekly showcase for uncut beat-driven tracks" has been a launchpad for the success of prolific electronic artists such as The Glitch Mob, Daedelus, Nosaj Thing and Flying Lotus, who describes the club's humble beginnings as a sort of "producer's lounge". The club night "showcases the links between classic Los Angeles rap and the fractured jazz of Eric Dolphy but also demonstrates how artists are using dazzling instrument technologies to upend both of those traditions".

Low End Theory has garnered much attention after multiple performances by Thom Yorke, who played for the normal price of ten dollars. "If tickets were left to auction online, they'd bring in enough to fund a state Senate campaign".

In 2014, The First Low End Theory Festival was Held at the Echoplex in Los Angeles. The First Festivals Lineup Included The Internet, Invisibl Skratch Piklz, Nosaj Thing, Baths, Daedelus, Teebs, Jonwayne, Knxwledge, Shlohmo, Ras G, Dntel, Dibiase, Mono/Poly, House Shoes, Kamasi Washington, Anderson Paak, Matthewdavid, Elos, Astronautica, and milo along with residents Daddy Kev, Dj Nobody, D Styles, Gaslamp Killer, and Nocando.

The monthly Low End Theory Podcast began in 2009 and features mixes from a resident DJ and one guest DJ. Since its inception, Low End Theory has expanded to Japan, San Francisco, New York City, and Europe, performing quarterly in Japan and every now and again in the latter three.

== Closure ==
The final Low End Theory show occurred on August 8, 2018, with a lineup featuring Tyler, the Creator, TOKiMONSTA, The Glitch Mob, Taylor McFerrin, Tsuruda, and Jake Jenkins.
