= Alpha Pup Records =

American independent record label and distributor

- Parent company: Virgin Music Group
- Founded: 2004
- Founder: Daddy Kev; Danyell Jariel
- Distributor: Virgin Music Group / UMG
- Genre: Hip-hop; electronic
- Country of origin: United States
- Location: Los Angeles, California
- Official website: https://www.alphapuprecords.com/

Alpha Pup Records is an American independent record label based in Los Angeles, California. It was founded by Daddy Kev and Danyell Jariel in 2004. LA Weekly placed it at number 2 on the "Top 10 Most Exciting L.A. Indie Labels of 2010" list.

== History ==
BBC One DJ Mary Anne Hobbs has supported Alpha Pup Records from its inception and comments that "the artists involved with Low End Theory, with the Brainfeeder label, with Alpha Pup, with Leaving Records all have close ties with the UK". In 2014, Chris Ziegler of LA Weekly described the label as "a big part of the reason why" "Los Angeles is one of the most vital cities in the world for electronic music right now".

It has released music from edIT, Daedelus, Reefer, Nosaj Thing, Nocando, Free the Robots, Take, Dibiase, Jonwayne, Young Montana?, Kone, Virtual Boy, Dot, Nobody, Mike Gao, Astronautica, Elusive, Invisibl Skratch Piklz, Mast, and Ryan Porter.
