= Daddy Kev =

American DJ and audio engineer (born 1974)

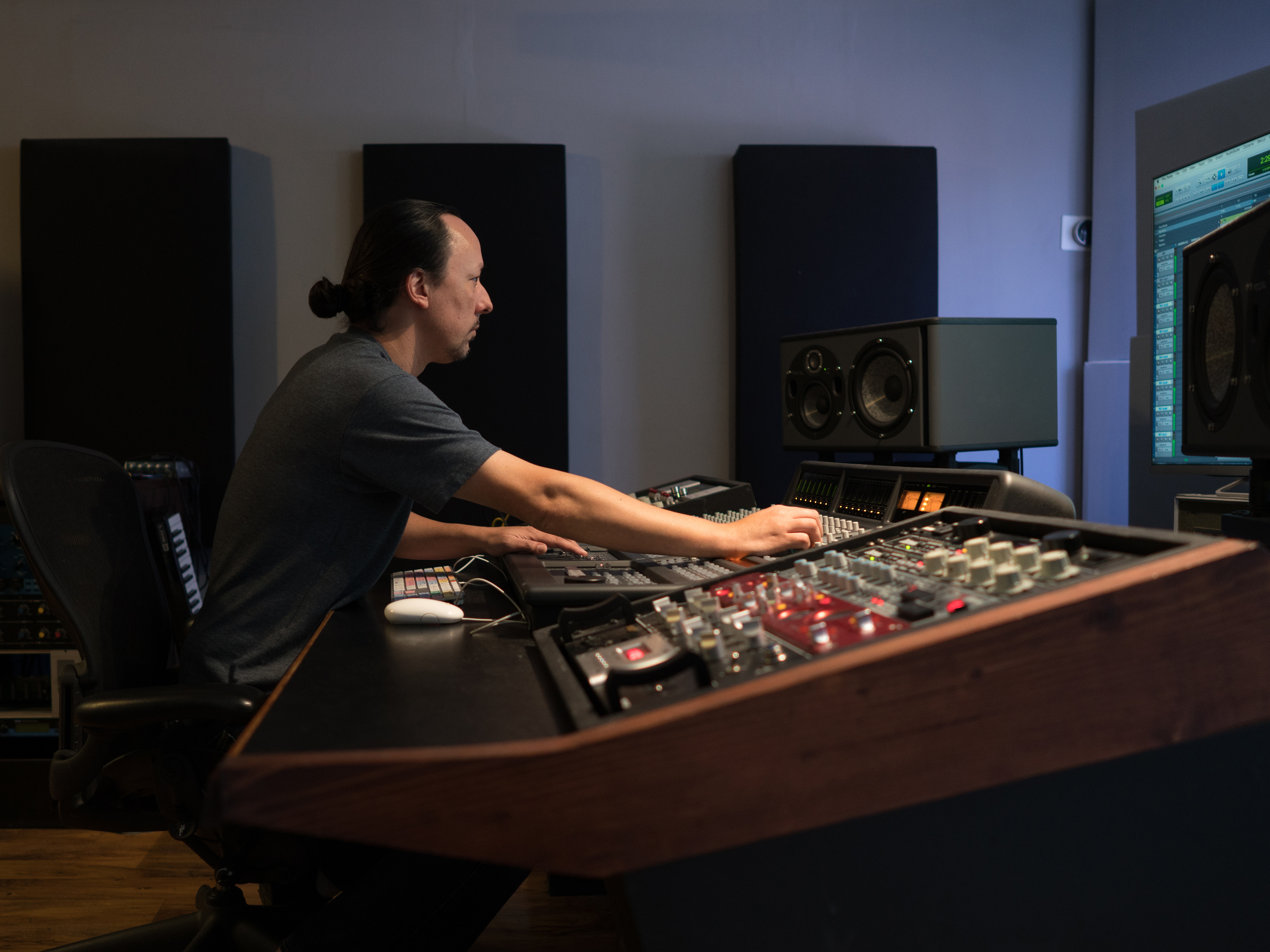
- Daddy Kev at Cosmic Zoo studio in 2018

Background information
- Born: Kevin Marques Moo; 1974 (age 51–52); Los Angeles, California, U.S.
- Genres: Hip-hop; electronic
- Occupations: DJ; engineer; producer
- Years active: 1998–present
- Labels: Alpha Pup; Celestial
- Website: www.alphapuprecords.com

Kevin Marques Moo (born 1974), better known by his stage name Daddy Kev, is an American record producer, DJ, Grammy Award-winning audio engineer, songwriter and executive from Los Angeles, California. He is the owner of Alpha Pup Records and the founder of Low End Theory. As an audio engineer, Daddy Kev has mixed and mastered albums by Flying Lotus, Thundercat, Kamasi Washington, and Leon Bridges.

== Early life ==
Daddy Kev was born and raised in the Harbor City neighborhood of Los Angeles. As a child, he played piano and trumpet. At the age of 13, he started playing turntables. He graduated from Narbonne High School. He earned a Bachelor of Arts in philosophy from University of California, San Diego.

== Career ==
In 2001, Daddy Kev released an EP, Lost Angels, on Celestial Recordings. It featured guest appearances from the rappers Myka 9, P.E.A.C.E., Busdriver, Awol One, and Circus. In that year, he also released Souldoubt, a collaborative album with Awol One, on Meanstreet Records. Another collaborative album with Awol One, titled Slanguage, was released on Mush Records in 2003. 2004 brought Busdriver's Cosmic Cleavage, which was produced entirely by Daddy Kev and released on Big Dada.

In 2006, he founded the weekly Low End Theory club night at the Airliner in the Lincoln Heights neighborhood of Los Angeles.

In 2012, he founded the studio Cosmic Zoo in Los Angeles along with the rapper Nocando.

At the 58th Annual Grammy Awards held in 2016, he was nominated for the Best Dance Recording award for mixing the Flying Lotus song "Never Catch Me" featuring Kendrick Lamar.

At the 63rd Annual Grammy Awards held in 2021, he won the Best Progressive R&B Album award for mixing the Thundercat album It Is What It Is.

In July 2021, he started the weekly Scenario club night in Los Angeles, which showcases upcoming artists in the local scene.

In 2022, he self-published a book on audio engineering entitled Audio Dynamics: Compression Techniques for Modern Mixing and Mastering.

At the 65th Annual Grammy Awards held in 2023, he was nominated for the Best Historical Album award for mastering the Freestyle Fellowship album To Whom It May Concern....

== Style and influences ==
Pitchfork called Daddy Kev "one of the Los Angeles underground's most visionary producers", while Fact called him "one of underground hip-hop's most respected engineers".

== Discography ==
=== Studio albums ===
- Souldoubt (2001) (with Awol One)
- Number 3 on the Phone (2002) (with Awol One)
- Slanguage (2003) (with Awol One)
- Reefer (2008) (with Nicholas Thorburn, as Reefer)

=== EPs ===
- Lost Angels (2001)
- Sound Advice (2003) (with The Grouch and D-Styles)
- Killafornia (2005) (with Awol One)

=== Singles ===
- "Rhythm" (2001) (with Awol One)

=== Productions ===
- Phoenix Orion – "Scanners", "Millennium Fever", "Dead Men Don't Download", and "Blade Runner" from Zimulated Experiencez (1998)
- Supernatural – "Seven Minutes of Understanding" (1999)
- Alien Nation – "Unicron" (1999)
- Sole – "Famous Last Words" from Bottle of Humans (2000)
- Naptron – "Marvin Meets Seymour Frye Pt. I" (2000)
- Mikah 9 – "First Things Last" from Timetable (2001)
- Abstract Rude – "Frisbee" from P.A.I.N.T. (2001)
- Busdriver – "Mindcrossings", "Suing Sony", and "Single Cell Ego" from Temporary Forever (2002)
- Existereo – "Four Way Window Pain" from Dirty Deeds & Dead Flowers (2003)
- Abstract Rude & Tribe Unique – "Flow and Tell" from Showtyme (2003)
- Neila – "Vertical Trees with Eternal Leaves" from Vertical Trees with Eternal Leaves (2003)
- Busdriver and Radioinactive – "Winthorp & Winthorp" (2003)
- Existereo – "Same Breath" from Crush Groove (2004)
- The Shape Shifters – "Rockin' These Mics", "Kreye Inn", and "Futuristic" from Was Here (2004)
- Busdriver – Cosmic Cleavage (2004)
- Sage Francis – "Dance Monkey" from A Healthy Distrust (2005)
- Awol One – "Everything's Perfect" from The War of Art (2006)
- Subtitle – "Restructure/Reroute" from Terrain to Roam (2006)
- Acid Reign – "Too Kool for Skool" and "Here Comes Trouble" from Time & Change (2008)
- The Grouch – "Shero" from Show You the World (2008)

=== Select works mastered by Daddy Kev ===
==== 2000s ====
- 2002 – Shockadoom – Freestyle Fellowship
- 2002 – Temporary Forever – Busdriver
- 2003 – Sound Advice – The Grouch
- 2004 – Bangzilla – Mix Master Mike
- 2004 – Cosmic Cleavage – Busdriver
- 2006 – Throw A Fit EP – Daedelus
- 2007 – Reset – Flying Lotus
- 2008 – Early Works For Me If It Works For You II – Dntel
- 2008 – Los Angeles – Flying Lotus
- 2008 – L.A. EP 1 X 3 – Flying Lotus
- 2008 – Ken Can Cook – Kenny Segal
- 2008 – Rap Beats Vol. 1 – Samiyam
- 2008 – Live at Low End Theory – Daedelus
- 2008 – Reefer – Reefer
- 2009 – Drift – Nosaj Thing
- 2009 – Brotha From Anotha Planet – Ras G

==== 2010s ====
- 2010 – Cosmogramma – Flying Lotus
- 2010 – Machines Hate Me – Dibiase
- 2010 – Ardour – Teebs
- 2010 – Midnight Menu – TOKiMONSTA
- 2010 – Shlomoshun Deluxe – Shlohmo
- 2010 – Cerulean – Baths
- 2010 – Camping – Shlohmo
- 2010 – After Parties 1 – Dntel
- 2010 – After Parties 2 – Dntel
- 2011 – The Golden Age of Apocalypse – Thundercat
- 2011 – Endless Planets – Austin Peralta
- 2011 – Bowser – Jonwayne
- 2011 – Collections 01 – Teebs
- 2011 – Creature Dreams – TOKiMONSTA
- 2011 – Complex Housing – Salva
- 2011 – Stade 2 – Mr. Oizo
- 2011 – Outmind – Matthewdavid
- 2011 – Manifestations – Mono/Poly
- 2011 – Life is Full of Possibilites (Deluxe Edition) – Dntel
- 2011 – Ghost People – Martyn
- 2011 – Sam Baker's Album – Samiyam
- 2012 – Until the Quiet Comes – Flying Lotus
- 2012 – The Death of Andrew – Jonwayne
- 2012 – When You're Gone – Lapalux
- 2012 – The Narcissist II – Dean Blunt
- 2013 – Indigoism – The Underachievers
- 2013 – Needs – Giraffage
- 2013 – Stade 3 – Mr. Oizo
- 2013 – Apocalypse – Thundercat
- 2013 – Kenny Dennis LP – Serengeti
- 2013 – Obsidian – Baths
- 2013 – Back on the Planet – Ras G
- 2013 – Rap Album One – Jonwayne
- 2014 – You're Dead! – Flying Lotus
- 2014 – In Return – ODESZA
- 2014 – a toothpaste suburb – Milo
- 2014 – Estara – Teebs
- 2014 – Desiderium – TOKiMONSTA
- 2014 – The Church – Mr. Oizo
- 2014 – Ocean Death – Baths
- 2014 – Vivid Green – Nobody
- 2015 – The Beyond / Where the Giants Roam – Thundercat
- 2015 – The Epic – Kamasi Washington
- 2015 – Jonwayne Is Retired EP – Jonwayne
- 2015 – The Courage of Present Times – Sonnymoon
- 2015 – So the Flies Don't Come – Milo
- 2015 – Hella Personal Film Festival – Open Mike Eagle
- 2015 – Mù Chè Shān Chū – Howie Lee
- 2015 – Plain Speaking – Scallops Hotel
- 2015 – Intermission – Shigeto
- 2015 – In the Moment E & F Sides – Makaya McCraven
- 2015 – Mars Is A Very Bad Place For Love – The Breathing Effect
- 2015 – Sold Out – DJ Paypal
- 2015 – Lil Me – Wiki
- 2015 – Chinese Nü Yr – Iglooghost
- 2015 – Thumbs – Busdriver
- 2015 – Evermore: The Art of Duality – The Underachievers
- 2015 – Shades – Alix Perez & EPROM
- 2016 – All Wet – Mr. Oizo
- 2016 – Callus – Gonjasufi
- 2016 – Labyrinths – Daedelus
- 2016 – Stairs – GASHI
- 2016 – Enter the Gungeon (Original Soundtrack) – Dose One
- 2016 – The Feminine: Act I – Anna Wise
- 2016 – Fool – Jameszoo
- 2016 – Astral Progressions – Josef Leimberg
- 2016 – No Reality – Nosaj Thing
- 2017 – Harmony of Difference – Kamasi Washington
- 2017 – Drunk – Thundercat
- 2017 – Brick Body Kids Still Daydream – Open Mike Eagle
- 2017 – Rap Album Two – Jonwayne
- 2017 – Mandela Effect – Gonjasufi
- 2017 – The Feminine: Act II – Anna Wise
- 2017 – Romaplasm – Baths
- 2017 – Spangle-Lang Lane – Ryan Porter
- 2017 – Triumph – Ronald Bruner Jr.
- 2017 – The Fisherman Abides – The Breathing Effect
- 2017 – Uprising – Miles Mosley
- 2018 – Who Told You to Think??!!?!?!?! – Milo
- 2018 – Aphelion – Ross from Friends
- 2018 – Heaven and Earth – Kamasi Washington
- 2018 – Overload – Georgia Anne Muldrow
- 2018 – Budding Ornithologists Are Weary of Tired Analogies – Milo
- 2018 – The Optimist – Ryan Porter
- 2018 – Family Portrait – Ross from Friends
- 2019 – Flamagra – Flying Lotus
- 2019 – I C U U C ME Pt. II – Sebastian Mikael
- 2019 – Force For Good – Ryan Porter
- 2019 – Encrypted & Vulnerable – Saul Williams
- 2019 – As If It Were Forever – Anna Wise
- 2019 – Epiphany – Ross from Friends
- 2019 – Zdenka 2080 – Salami Rose Joe Louis
- 2019 – Trust in the Lifeforce of the Deep Mystery – The Comet Is Coming

==== 2020s ====
- 2020 – It Is What It Is – Thundercat
- 2020 – Becoming — Music from the Netflix Original Documentary – Kamasi Washington
- 2020 – Crazy – Kelly Rowland
- 2020 – Purple Moonlight Pages – R.A.P. Ferreira
- 2020 – Anime, Trauma and Divorce – Open Mike Eagle
- 2020 – Photosynthesis – The Breathing Effect
- 2020 – Sea Monster – Joey Pecoraro
- 2020 – The Room – Ricky Reed
- 2020 – These Days – St. Panther
- 2020 – Ryan Porter (Live at New Morning, Paris) – Ryan Porter
- 2021 – bob's son: R.A.P. Ferreira in the garden level cafe of the scallops hotel – R.A.P. Ferreira
- 2021 – Gold-Diggers Sound – Leon Bridges
- 2021 – Duets | Golden Gate Bridge – Nate Mercereau
- 2021 – Under the Lilac Sky – Arushi Jain
- 2021 – Primordial Waters – Jamael Dean
- 2021 – Greatness / Places – St. Panther
- 2021 – BLK VINTAGE – BLK ODYSSY
- 2021 – the Light Emitting Diamond Cutter Scriptures – R.A.P. Ferreira
- 2021 – shut the fuck up talking to me – Zack Fox
- 2021 – When There's Love Around – Kiefer
- 2021 – To Whom It May Concern... – Freestyle Fellowship
- 2022 – Ozzy's Dungeon – Flying Lotus
- 2022 – PHILEO – Sebastian Mikael
- 2022 – Component System with the Auto Reverse – Open Mike Eagle
- 2022 – 5 to the Eye with Stars – R.A.P. Ferreira
- 2022 – Resilience – Ryan Porter
- 2022 – SUNDAYS EXPANSION – Nate Mercereau
- 2022 – Hyper-Dimensional Expansion Beam – The Comet Is Coming
- 2022 – wood tip – Zack Fox
- 2022 – LUME – Jeff Rona
- 2023 – Ojai Orange Grove Concert – Nate Mercereau
- 2023 – Intergalactic Warp Terminal 222 – Lionmilk
- 2023 – PHILEO Deluxe – Sebastian Mikael
- 2023 – Live in Venice – Nate Mercereau
- 2023 – Saana Sahel – Colloboh
- 2023 – Akousmatikous – Salami Rose Joe Louis
- 2023 – SOUTHEND LEGEND – KingTrey
- 2023 – Another Triumph of Ghetto Engineering – Open Mike Eagle
- 2023 – The Fall Collection – Hemlock Ernst & Height Keech
- 2023 – It's Ok, B U – Kiefer
- 2023 – How To Capture Playful – Pink Navel & Kenny Segal
- 2024 – Subtle Movements – Surya Botofasina, Nate Mercereau & Carlos Niño
- 2024 – the First Fist to Make Contact When We Dap – R.A.P. Ferreira & Fumitake Tamura
- 2024 – The Bird – Delilah Montagu
- 2024 – Delight – Arushi Jain
- 2024 – Paradigm Shift – Sebastian Mikael
- 2024 – This Ain't the Way You Go Out – Lucy Rose
- 2024 – Night Reign – Arooj Aftab
- 2024 – Spirit Box – Flying Lotus
- 2024 – OUTSTANDING UNDERSTANDING – R.A.P. Ferreira
- 2025 – Pale Blue Eyes – Lucy Rose
- 2025 – ASH (Original Motion Picture Soundtrack) – Flying Lotus
- 2025 – Lorings – Salami Rose Joe Louis
- 2025 – Weirdo – Emma-Jean Thackray
- 2025 – Oriki Duuru – Jamael Dean
- 2025 – Mystic Journey – Josef Leimberg
- 2025 – Gadabout Season – Brandee Younger
- 2025 – Openness Trio – Nate Mercereau, Josh Johnson, Carlos Niño
- 2025 – ANYWHERE HERE IS PERFECT – Sam Gellaitry
- 2025 – The Night Green Side of It – R.A.P. Ferreira & Kenny Segal
- 2026 – BIG MAMA – Flying Lotus
- 2026 – Sweet Dreams (Are Made Of This) – Anish Kumar & Arooj Aftab
- 2026 – 1983 (Remastered) – Flying Lotus
- 2026 – Mudhole – Captain Murphy
- 2026 – DOOMED! – Open Mike Eagle & Kenny Segal
- 2026 – Fantastic Thoughts – Nate Mercereau
- 2026 – Memory Bomb – Kiefer

== Awards and nominations ==
Award	Year of ceremony	Nominee / work	Category	Result	Ref(s)
Grammy Awards	2016	Flying Lotus featuring Kendrick Lamar – "Never Catch Me"	Best Dance Recording	Nominated	
Grammy Awards	2021	Thundercat – It Is What It Is	Best Progressive R&B Album	Won	
Grammy Awards	2023	Freestyle Fellowship – To Whom It May Concern...	Best Historical Album	Nominated	
