= Mush Records discography =

This is a complete list of all Mush Records so far.

== Releases ==
Cat. #	Artist	Title	Release date	Format
MH-001	Boom Bip & DJ Osiris	The Low End Sequence EP	March 10, 1998	12-inch EP
MH-002	Lulu Mushi	Oval Compositions	March 10, 1998	12-inch EP
MH-003	J. Cru	Freestyles	March 10, 1998	12-inch EP
MH-004	Glenn Underground	The Fish Fry	November 10, 1998	12-inch EP
MH-005	Nickodemus And Jay B.	A New Day	November 10, 1998	12-inch EP
MH-006	Neutrino	Quest	February 22, 2000	12-inch EP
MH-007	Fat Jon the Ample Soul Physician	Dyslexic	August 15, 2000	12-inch EP
MH-008	Fat Jon the Ample Soul Physician	Stasis	September 25, 2001	12-inch EP
MH-009	Nickodemus	Earth	November 7, 2000	12-inch EP
MH-010	Jel	The Meat & Oil EP	September 17, 2002	12-inch EP
MH-012	cLOUDDEAD	Apt. A	November 14, 2000	10-inch EP
MH-013	cLOUDDEAD	And All You Can Do Is Laugh	December 19, 2000	10-inch EP
MH-014	cLOUDDEAD	I Promise Never To Get Paint On My Glasses Again	January 16, 2001	10-inch EP
MH-015	cLOUDDEAD	JimmyBreeze	February 13, 2001	10-inch EP
MH-016	cLOUDDEAD	(Cloud Dead Number Five)	March 20, 2001	10-inch EP
MH-017	cLOUDDEAD	Bike	April 17, 2001	10-inch EP
MH-018	So-Called Artists	Sideshow	April 24, 2001	Picture Disc EP
MH-019	cLOUDDEAD	The Sound Of A Handshake/This About The City	March 12, 2002	10-inch EP
MH-020	cLOUDDEAD	The Peel Session	November 20, 2001	10-inch EP
MH-021	Busdriver and Radioinactive as The Weather	Touch Type/Winthorp & Winthorp	November 26, 2002	7-inch EP
MH-022	Antimc	Run	September 2, 2003	12-inch EP
MH-023	Fisk Industries	The Isle Of Wight EP	November 11, 2003	10-inch EP
MH-024	Loden	All That's Left Is Right	December 2, 2003	12-inch EP
MH-025	Andre Afram Asmar	Transmigration	September 30, 2003	12-inch EP
MH-026	cLOUDDEAD	Dead Dogs Two	February 3, 2004	12-inch EP
MH-027	Daedelus & Boom Bip	28:06:42:12	August 3, 2004	7-inch EP
MH-028	Busdriver	Avantcore	January 18, 2005	12-inch EP
MH-029	Nobody	Fancy	March 8, 2005	7-inch EP
MH-030	Her Space Holiday	Let's Get Quiet Vol. 1	May 31, 2005	12-inch EP
MH-031	Daedelus	Impending Doom/Just Briefly	December 13, 2005	12-inch EP
MH-032	Pedro	Fear & Resilience	November 9, 2004	12-inch EP
MH-033	Nobody & Mystic Chords of Memory	Broaden A New Sound	May 30, 2006	12-inch EP
MH-034	Daedelus	Sundown	October 3, 2006	12-inch EP
MH-035	Fisk Industries	77 And Rising	May 2, 2006	10-inch EP
MH-036	Her Space Holiday	Let's Get Quiet Vol. 2	June 12, 2007	12-inch EP
MH-037	Clue to Kalo	Man Who Took A Step Expecting A Stair But Instead Got Level Ground	November 14, 2006	Picture Disc EP
MH-038	Boy In Static	Where It Ends	July 10, 2007	Digital EP
MH-039	Head Like A Kite	No Ordinary Caveman	August 19, 2008	Digital EP
MH-040	Blue Sky Black Death	Rebel To The Grain/Slap Box With Jesus	To Be Released	7-inch EP
MH-041	Her Space Holiday	Sleepy Tigers	July 29, 2008	CD EP
MH-042	Bibio	Ovals And Emeralds	March 3, 2009	10-inch EP
MH-201	Boom Bip and Doseone	Circle	August 1, 2000	2×LP/CD
MH-202	Aesop Rock	Float	September 5, 2000	2×LP/CD
MH-203	Radioinactive	Pyramidi	August 28, 2001	2×LP/CD
MH-204	So-Called Artists	Paint By Number Songs	April 24, 2001	2×LP/CD
MH-205	Fat Jon the Ample Soul Physician	Wave Motion	April 30, 2002	1×LP/CD
MH-206	cLOUDDEAD	cLOUDDEAD	May 8, 2001	3×LP/CD
MH-207	Labtekwon	Song of the Sovereign	January 15, 2002	2×LP/CD
MH-208	Jel	10 Seconds	October 22, 2002	2×LP/CD
MH-209	Odd Nosdam	Plan 9... Meat Your Hypnotis.	January 22, 2002	2×LP/CD
MH-210	Qua	Forgetabout	July 16, 2002	CD
MH-211	Curse Ov Dialect	Lost In The Real Sky	May 27, 2003	2×LP/CD
MH-212	Reaching Quiet	In The Shadow Of The Living Room	June 25, 2002	2×LP/CD
MH-213	Clue to Kalo	Come Here When You Sleepwalk	March 4, 2003	2×LP/CD
MH-214	Awol One & Daddy Kev	Slanguage	March 18, 2003	2×LP/CD
MH-215	Busdriver & Radioinactive with Daedelus	The Weather	February 18, 2003	2×LP/CD
MH-216	Andre Afram Asmar	Racetothebottom	February 18, 2003	2×LP/CD
MH-217	Listener	Whispermoon	July 29, 2003	2×LP/CD
MH-218	Daedelus	Rethinking the Weather	June 10, 2003	1×LP/CD
MH-219	Villain Accelerate	Maid of Gold	August 12, 2003	2×LP/CD
MH-220	Neutrino	Neutrino	June 1, 2004	2×LP/CD
MH-221	Omid	Monolith	September 16, 2003	2×LP/CD
MH-222	Octavius	Audio Noir	October 14, 2003	2×LP/CD
MH-223	Thavius Beck	Decomposition	February 17, 2004	2×LP/CD
MH-224	Her Space Holiday	The Young Machines	September 30, 2003	1×LP/CD
MH-225	The Opus	Breathing Lessons	February 3, 2004	2×LP/CD
MH-226	Radioinactive and Antimc	Free Kamal	June 29, 2004	2×LP/CD
MH-227	Neotropic	White Rabbits	August 17, 2004	2×LP/CD
MH-228	Circus vs. Andre Afram Asmar	Gawd Bless the Faceless Cowards	June 15, 2004	2×LP/CD
MH-229	Qua	Painting Monsters On Clouds	June 1, 2004	CD
MH-230	cLOUDDEAD	Ten	March 16, 2004	1×LP/CD
MH-231	Her Space Holiday	The Young Machines (Remixed)	November 9, 2004	1×LP/CD
MH-232	Daedelus	Exquisite Corpse	March 22, 2005	1×LP/CD
MH-233	scntfc	Strong For The Future	December 14, 2004	1×LP/CD
MH-234	Bibio	Fi	February 8, 2005	1×LP/CD
MH-235	Busdriver	Fear of a Black Tangent	February 22, 2005	1×LP/CD
MH-236	S.E.V.A.	S.E.V.A.	June 28, 2005	1×LP/CD
MH-237	iD And Sleeper	Displacement	August 16, 2005	1×LP/CD
MH-238	Clue to Kalo	One Way, It's Every Way	September 20, 2005	1×LP/CD
MH-239	Bigg Jus	Poor People's Day	November 8, 2005	1×LP/CD
MH-240	Pedro	Pedro [2006 Edition]	February 14, 2006	2×LP/2×CD
MH-241	Nobody & Mystic Chords of Memory	Tree Colored See	April 25, 2005	1×LP/CD
MH-242	Caural	Remembering Today	December 6, 2005	LP/CD
MH-243	Blue Sky Black Death	A Heap of Broken Images	May 23, 2006	2×LP/2×CD
MH-244	Bibio	Hand Cranked	March 7, 2006	1×LP/CD
MH-245	Daedelus	Denies The Day's Demise	May 9, 2006	2×LP/CD
MH-246	Curse Ov Dialect	Wooden Tongues	September 19, 2006	CD
MH-247	Thavius Beck	Thru	October 3, 2006	1×LP/CD
MH-248	K-The-I???	Broken Love Letter	October 31, 2006	1×LP/CD
MH-249	Caural	Mirrors For Eyes	October 17, 2006	2×LP/CD
MH-250	Antimc	It's Free, But It's Not Cheap	November 14, 2006	1×LP/CD
MH-251	Loden	Valeen Hope	October 11, 2005	CD
MH-252	Lymbyc Systym	Love Your Abuser	January 30, 2007	1×LP/CD
MH-253	Fisk Industries	EPs And Rarities	May 15, 2007	2×LP/2×CD
MH-254	Boy In Static	Violet	May 29, 2007	1×LP/CD
MH-255	Pedro	You, Me & Everyone	November 6, 2007	CD
MH-256	4 Bonjour's Parties	Pigments Drift Down To The Brook	December 4, 2007	CD
MH-257	Sleeper	Behind Every Mask	February 17, 2009	CD
MH-258	Eliot Lipp	The Outside	April 8, 2008	CD
MH-259	Head Like A Kite	There Is Loud Laughter Everywhere	June 17, 2008	CD
MH-260	Her Space Holiday	XOXO, Panda And The New Kid Revival	October 7, 2008	CD
MH-261	Lymbyc Systym	Love Your Abuser Remixed	September 23, 2008	CD
MH-262	Clue to Kalo	Lily Perdida	January 20, 2009	CD
MH-263	Bibio	Vignetting The Compost	February 3, 2009	CD
MH-264	K-The-I???	Yesterday, Today & Tomorrow	November 4, 2008	CD
MH-279	Pregnant	Life Hard: I Try	September 6, 2011	CD
MH-287	Pregnant	Pottery Mill	April 30, 2013	Digital Album
MH-401	Various Artists	Ropeladder 12	March 14, 2000	3×LP/CD
MH-402	Various Artists	Ten Years Of Mush Records	December 30, 2008	2×CD
MH-601	Boom Bip	Doo Doo Breaks Volume 1	August 22, 2000	1×LP
MH-602	Boom Bip	Doo Doo Tones	October 22, 2002	1×LP
MH-603	Blockhead	Broke Beats	October 2, 2001	1×LP
MH-604	Boom Bip	Doo Doo Breaks Volume 2	January 21, 2003	1×LP
MH-605	Antimc	Bitter Breaks One	October 28, 2003	1×LP
MH-100	Shinamo Moki	You Couldn't Be More Distant	August 19, 2014	CD
MH-901	Various Artists	Mush Tour Spring 2002	June 24, 2003	DVD
