= Self Titled (Awol One album) =

Studio album by Awol One
- Released: June 8, 2004
- Genre: Hip-hop
- Length: 1:01:48
- Label: Paladin Creative Super Co.
- Producer: DJ Hashim; Evidence; KutMasta Kurt; LA Jae; Mike Nardone; Omid Walizadeh; Peyote Cody; Transducer; Truly Odd

Awol One chronology
Slanguage (2003)	Self Titled (2004)	The Chemikillz (2006)

Professional ratings
Review scores
Source	Rating
AllMusic	2/5 stars
HipHopDX	5.5/10
Spin	B+
Tiny Mix Tapes	3.5/5 marks

Self Titled is a solo studio album by American rapper Awol One. It was released on June 8, 2004 via Paladin Creative Superco. Production was handled by Transducer, DJ Hashim, Evidence, KutMasta Kurt, LA Jae, Mike Nardone, Omid, Peyote Cody and Truly Odd. It features guest appearances from Circus, 2Mex, Abstract Rude, Busdriver, Doc Lewd and Radioinactive.

== Track listing ==
No.	Title	Producer(s)	Length
1.	"Make"	Evidence	3:04
2.	"Believe"	KutMasta Kurt	4:26
3.	"Time"	Transducer	4:27
4.	"Slide"	DJ Hashim	4:03
5.	"S.O.T.F." (featuring Circus and 2Mex)	Transducer; DJ Bam-Bam (co.)	3:50
6.	"Antisocial"	Transducer	3:16
7.	"Matters" (featuring Circus)	Transducer	3:47
8.	"Grow" (featuring Abstract Rude)	Mike Nardone	3:31
9.	"Memowrecks"	Omid	3:36
10.	"Fears"	LA Jae	4:01
11.	"Fatalove"	Transducer	5:18
12.	"Realeyes"	Transducer	3:34
13.	"On"	Truly Odd	3:58
14.	"Push"	Peyote Cody	2:58
15.	"Take"	Transducer	3:39
16.	"Gagbuster" (featuring Busdriver, Circus, 2Mex, Radioinactive and Doc Lewd)	Transducer	4:20
Total length:			1:01:48
