= Awol One =

American rapper

- Also known as: Awolrus One
- Born: Anthony Charles Martin; Los Angeles, California, United States
- Origin: Los Angeles, California, United States
- Genres: Alternative hip-hop; underground hip-hop
- Occupation: Rapper Graphic Designer songwriter
- Years active: 1995–present
- Label: Fake Four Inc.
- Website: speakerface.store

Anthony Charles Martin, better known by his stage name Awol One, is a songwriter, alternative hip-hop artist and graphic designer based in Los Angeles, California.

== Discography ==
=== Albums ===
Awol One

- Souldoubt (2001) (with Daddy Kev)
- Number 3 on the Phone (2002) (with Daddy Kev)
- Speakerface (2002) (with Mike Nardone)
- Slanguage (2003) (with Daddy Kev)
- Self Titled (2004)
- The War of Art (2006)
- Only Death Can Kill You (2007) (with Factor Chandelier)
- Owl Hours (2009) (with Factor)
- The Landmark (2011) (with Factor)
- The Child Star (2011) (with Nathaniel Motte)
- The Mombie (2013)
- Feo (2016)
- Primer (2019)

The Shape Shifters (Awol One with Akuma, Circus, Die Young, DJ Rob One, Existereo, LA Jae, Life Rexall & Radioinactive)

- Planet of the Shapes (1998)
- Adopted by Aliens (2000)
- Know Future (2000)
- The Shape Shifters Was Here (2004)

Three Eyed Cowz (Awol One with Digit 6, DJ ESP, Gel Roc, Origin, Regret, Syndrome 228 & Vyrus)

- The Evil Cow Burger (1998)
- Four Eyed Mortalz (2000)

The Chemikillz (Awol One with Mascaria)

- The Chemikillz (2006)
- Eggs of Blood (2009)

Other collaborations

- Awol One & Ecid Are... (2010) (with Ecid)
- The Cloaks (2010) (with Gel Roc, as The Cloaks)

=== EPs ===
- Propaganda (2002) (with Fat Jack)
- Splitsville (2007) (split with DJ Moves & Josh Martinez)
- Shockra! (2012)
- Self Induced (2013)
- Crossroads EP (2015) (with Factor)

=== Guest appearances ===
- Fat Jack - “For Me” from Cater to the DJ (1999)
- Busdriver & Radioinactive with Daedelus - "Barely Music" from The Weather (2003)
- 2Mex - "No Category" from Sweat Lodge Infinite (2003)
- Abstract Tribe Unique - "Flow and Tell" from Showtyme (2003)
- Existereo - "Space Meditation" from Dirty Deeds & Dead Flowers (2003)
- Josh Martinez - "Women Loving Women" from Buck Up Princess (2004)
- Busdriver - "Cosmic Cleavage" from Cosmic Cleavage (2004)
- Circus vs. Andre Afram Asmar - "Nobody Special" from Gawd Bless the Faceless Cowards (2004)
- Fat Jack - “Calendar Girl” from Cater to the DJ 2 (2004)
- 2Mex - "Baby I Ain't Joking" from 2Mex (2004)
- Abstract Rude - "Waiting For My Ruca" from Look at All the Love We Found (2005)
- Daddy Kev - "Lick Me I'm Famous" from Lost Angels (2005)
- Subtitle - "Crew Cut (for Sale) from Young Dangerous Heart (2005)
- Blue Sky Black Death - "Everything" from A Heap of Broken Images (2006)
- Scuba Chicken - "Dave The Squirrel" from Lets Play Doctor (2006)
- LA Symphony - "Love for the Art" from Unleashed (2007)
- Josh Martinez - "Struts" from The World Famous Sex Buffet (2008)
- Factor Chandelier - "More Rude Than Handsome" from Chandelier (2008)
- Depth Affect - "Dusty Records" from Hero Crisis (2008)
- Speak Easy - "Speak Easy" from Speak Easy (2009)
- Grayskul & Maker - "Revenge of the Alleybastards" from Graymaker (2009)
- Myka 9 - "91 Octane" from 1969 (2009)
- Ceschi - "Same Old Love Song" (2009)
- Factor - "Don't Jock the Dead" from 13 Stories (2010)
- Existereo - "First Time Once Again" from Excuse My French (2010)
- Dark Time Sunshine - "Murder Scene" from Cornucopia (2010)
- Noah23 - "Murder City" from Fry Cook on Venus (2011)
- Factor - "What You Need" from Club Soda Series 1 (2011)
- Brzowski - "Covenant" from A Fitful Sleep (2011)
- Sixo - "Melting Away" from Tracking Perception (2012)
- Sixo - "Gorgeous" from Free Floating Rationales (2012)
- Cadalack Ron + Briefcase - "Jackknife" from Times Is Hard (2012)
- Kay the Aquanaut & Factor - "Pangean Drift" from Letters from Laika (2013)
- Gregory Pepper & Madadam - "Walrus for Mayor" from Big Huge Truck (2013)
