= Qua =

Qua or QUA may refer to:

== People ==
- Qua Grant (born 1999), American basketball player
- Qua Russaw (born 2005), American football player
- Alfonso Qua, sailor from Philippines
- Lam Qua (1801–1860), Chinese painter
- Qua, a recording artist for Mush Records

== Other ==
- Qua (album), a 2009 album by German band Cluster
- Castle Qua, in Scotland
- Quapaw language

== See also ==
- Lord Quas (musician)
- Quas
- quas primas
- QwaQwa
- Kua
- Quah (disambiguation)
- Kwa (disambiguation)
- Cwa (disambiguation)
- Qa (disambiguation)
