= Early Riser =

Studio album by Taylor McFerrin
- Released: June 2, 2014
- Genres: Soul jazz; electronica
- Length: 41:17
- Label: Brainfeeder
- Producer: Taylor McFerrin

Taylor McFerrin chronology
Early Riser (2014)	Love's Last Chance (2019)

Singles from Early Riser
- 1. "Place in my Heart" Released: February 28, 2011

Professional ratings
Aggregate scores
Source	Rating
Metacritic	78/100
Review scores
Source	Rating
AllMusic	4/5 stars
Crack	8/10
Exclaim!	8/10
Pitchfork	6.8/10
PopMatters	7/10
The Guardian	3/5 stars
The Irish Times	3/5 stars
The Line of Best Fit	8.5/10 stars
The Skinny	4/5 stars

Early Riser is the debut studio album by American musician Taylor McFerrin. It was released on June 2, 2014, through Brainfeeder. Produced by McFerrin himself, it features contributions from Bobby McFerrin, César Camargo Mariano, Emily King, Jason Fraticelli, Marcus Gilmore, Nai Palm, Robert Glasper, Ryat and Thundercat.

== Critical reception ==
Early Riser was met with generally favorable reviews from music critics. At Metacritic, which assigns a normalized rating out of 100 to reviews from mainstream publications, the album received an average score of 78 based on ten reviews.

Rory Foster of The Line of Best Fit wrote: "the album was not created lightly, and by no means deserves to be skimmed, but there's a diversity and thirst within this album that stands to keep Early Riser remembered for some time, and will no doubt lead McFerrin to achieve the same". AllMusic's Andy Kellman wrote: "while Early Riser was pieced and patched together, it flows as a gleaming focused set that combines left-field electronics, alternative R&B, and futuristic jazz". Del F. Cowie of Exclaim! wrote: "it's possible to detect elements of jazz, '70s soul, hip-hop and electronica in McFerrin's heliocentric mix, but through his intentional blurring of the boundaries, he underlines his mastery of and ultimate disregard for genre categorie". John Paul of PopMatters wrote: "with McFerrin and this latest crop of open, creative minds exploring the hallowed halls of jazz, there seems to be hope the form can and will continue to exist and evolve with society, remaining a relevant and integral art form on the musical and cultural landscape". Renato Pagnani of Pitchfork found that the album is "built for slow weekend mornings spent in bed with a loved one more than brisk, early-morning runs". In a mixed review, Lanre Bakare of The Guardian stated: "McFerrin seeks to take some of those flights of fancy and turn them into something that’s compatible with modern hip-hop and neo-soul".

== Track listing ==
No.	Title	Writer(s)	Length
1.	"Postpartum"	Taylor McFerrin; Jason Fraticelli	3:58
2.	"Degrees of Light"	T. McFerrin	2:48
3.	"The Antidote"	T. McFerrin; Naomi Saalfield	3:05
4.	"Florasia"	T. McFerrin	4:16
5.	"4 A.M."	T. McFerrin; Marcus Gilmore	0:40
6.	"Stepps"	T. McFerrin	5:00
7.	"Already There"	T. McFerrin; Robert Glasper; Stephen Bruner; Gilmore	2:59
8.	"Decisions"	T. McFerrin; Emily King	3:14
9.	"Blind Aesthetics"	T. McFerrin	1:09
10.	"Place in My Heart"	T. McFerrin; Christina McGeehan	4:56
11.	"Invisible/Visible"	T. McFerrin; Bobby McFerrin; César Camargo Mariano; Gilmore	4:23
12.	"PLS DNT LSTN"	T. McFerrin; Fraticelli; Gilmore	4:49
Total length:			41:17

Japanese edition bonus track
No.	Title	Length
13.	"My Queen" (featuring Vincent Parker)	4:45

== Personnel ==
- Taylor McFerrin — vocals (track 1), Rhodes electric piano (tracks: 1–6, 10–12), synthesizer, drums (track: 2–4, 6, 8–10), bass (tracks: 3, 4, 10), guitar (tracks: 4, 10), drum programming (track 11), producer
- Jason Fraticelli – vocals (track 1), bass (tracks: 1, 11, 12)
- Marcus Gilmore — drums (tracks: 1, 4, 7, 11, 12)
- Naomi "Nai Palm" Saalfield – vocals (track 3)
- Robert Glasper — Rhodes electric piano & synthesizer (track 7)
- Stephen "Thundercat" Bruner – bass (track 7)
- Emily King — vocals (track 8)
- Christina "Ryat" McGeehan – vocals (track 10)
- Robert Keith "Bobby" McFerrin Jr. — vocals (track 11)
- César Camargo Mariano — piano (track 11)
- Simon Benjamin – art direction, photography

== Charts ==
Chart (2014)	Peak position
Belgian Albums (Ultratop Flanders)	150
