= In My World (Matthewdavid album) =

Studio album by Matthewdavid
- Released: June 30, 2014
- Genre: Electronic
- Length: 30:23
- Label: Brainfeeder
- Producers: Matthewdavid; D/P/I

Matthewdavid chronology
Outmind (2011)	In My World (2014)

In My World is the second studio album by Matthewdavid. It was released on Brainfeeder on June 30, 2014.

== Critical reception ==
Professional ratings
Aggregate scores
Source	Rating
Metacritic	66/100
Review scores
Source	Rating
The 405	4/10
AllMusic	3/5 stars
Exclaim!	8/10
Fact	mixed
MusicOMH	4/5 stars
Pitchfork	5.4/10
Resident Advisor	2.5/5
The Skinny	3/5 stars
Tiny Mix Tapes	3.5/5 stars

At Metacritic, which assigns a weighted average score out of 100 to reviews from mainstream critics, the album received an average score of 66, based on 10 reviews, indicating "generally favorable reviews".

Dylan Kilby of MusicOMH gave the album 4 out of 5 stars, describing it as "a cluster of deep house grooves, chopped and screwed R&B vocals, and sub-bass that would be played at a futuristic Stonewall Inn." Matt Bauer of Exclaim! gave the album an 8 out of 10, writing, "it jettisons its predecessor's more experimental tendencies in favour of psychedelic, neo-soul-pop filtered through Brainfeeder's expected eccentricity." Larry Fitzmaurice of Pitchfork gave the album a 5.4 out of 10, commenting that "his choice to sing, rap, and sing-rap throughout In My World is obviously risky; his vocals tend to distract from what surrounds them, and his skill on the mic is, at best, rudimentary."

== Track listing ==
No.	Title	Length
1.	"In My World"	3:31
2.	"Cosmic Caller"	2:47
3.	"The Mood Is Right"	2:22
4.	"Perpetual Moon Moods"	3:43
5.	"House of Horus"	2:18
6.	"Next to You Always"	3:11
7.	"Artforms"	3:01
8.	"Singing Flats"	2:33
9.	"West Coast Jungle Juke"	3:01
10.	"Birds in Flight" (featuring The Light of Love Children's Choir)	3:56

== Personnel ==
Credits adapted from liner notes.

- Matthewdavid – production, recording, mixing, mastering
- D/P/I – co-production (3)
- The Light of Love Children's Choir – guest appearance (10)
- Logan White – photography
- Seth Ferris – design
