= Ideas+drafts+loops =

Mixtape by Flying Lotus
- Released: December 10, 2013
- Genres: Psychedelic; hip-hop; electronic; jazz
- Length: 61:24
- Labels: Self-released; Brainfeeder
- Producers: Flying Lotus; DJ Mehdi

Flying Lotus chronology
Duality (2012)	Ideas+drafts+loops (2013)	You're Dead! (2014)

Ideas+drafts+loops is a mixtape by Flying Lotus, released on December 10, 2013, by Brainfeeder. It was released for free via MediaFire and the Brainfeeder website. The mixtape contains guest appearances by Andreya Triana, Baths, Earl Sweatshirt, Mapei, Niki Randa, Shabazz Palaces, Thundercat, The Underachievers and Viktor Vaughn; and a remix of Kanye West's song "Black Skinhead".

== Composition ==
The mixtape was characterized as psychedelic and hip-hop, with August Brown of Los Angeles Times describing some songs as "dinner jazz", "synth-velvety" and "hard core".

The mixtape mainly consists of unfinished "scraps" from his then-upcoming 2014 album You're Dead!. However, it also contains previously released material. The song "About That Time" was written for and featured in Cartoon Network series Adventure Time, as the closing theme for the episode "A Glitch Is a Glitch", titled as "About That Time//A Glitch Is a Glitch". The songs "Aqua Teen 24" and "Chasing Apples" are used the intro and outro theme respectively for Aqua TV Show Show, an alternative title for the tenth season of the Adult Swim series Aqua Teen Hunger Force. "Colemans Groove" is a version of a groove used by Hodgy in his song "Lately", and "Between Villains" was previously released as a part of Adult Swim Singles Program 2013.

== Release ==
The mixtape was released via MediaFire as a compliment for having reached 300 thousand followers on Twitter. However, it was taken down by request of Nintendo of America on October 23, 2015. It was also posted on DatPiff as 24 Song Zip File.

== Reception ==
Brown said that "sonically, the package is all over the place", but "it's an interesting look behind the curtain". Carl Acheson of SLUG stated that the mixtape is "full of experiments and collaborations that show how flexible Flying Lotus is as an artist" and that "it is a psychedelic delve into the mind of an electronically inspired madman".

== Track listing ==
All tracks produced by Flying Lotus; except "Ideas", which is co-produced by DJ Mehdi.

Ideas+drafts+loops
No.	Title	Length
1.	"About That Time"	1:48
2.	"Adventure Sound" (featuring The Underachievers)	3:15
3.	"An Xbox Killed My Dog"	2:48
4.	"Aqua Teen 24"	0:46
5.	"Aqua Teen 24 Instrumental"	0:45
6.	"Between Villains" (featuring Earl Sweatshirt, Captain Murphy and Viktor Vaughn)	3:32
7.	"Chasing Apples"	1:52
8.	"Colemans Groove" (featuring Andreya Triana and Niki Randa)	1:25
9.	"Coswerved Draft"	1:15
10.	"Flotus"	3:27
11.	"Ideas" (featuring Mapei)	3:36
12.	"Hide Me" (featuring Shabazz Palaces)	1:41
13.	"Little Hours" (featuring Baths)	1:47
14.	"Meadow Man 2"	3:32
15.	"Oatmeal Face"	1:52
16.	"Osaka Trade"	2:41
17.	"Puppet Talk"	1:20
18.	"Stonecutters"	4:19
19.	"Such a Square"	2:28
20.	"The Diddler"	4:55
21.	"The Kill" (featuring Niki Randa)	3:25
22.	"Black Skinhead (Remix)" (featuring Thundercat)	3:08
23.	"Tree Tunnels 3"	1:24
24.	"Wake Me"	4:23
Total length:		61:24

Sample credits

- "An Xbox Killed My Dog" contains samples of "Tiden" by That's Why.
- "Aqua Teen 24" contains samples of "Here Comes the Meter Man", performed by The Meters.
- "Chasing Apples" contains samples of "Ode to Billie Joe", written by Bobbie Gentry and performed by Lou Donaldson.
- "Colemans Groove" contains samples of "Falcon Love Call (Armazém No. 2)", written by Jose Roberto Bertrami, Alex Malheiros and Ivan Conti, and performed by Azymuth; and "Lately", written and performed by Hodgy Beats.
- "Flotus" contains samples of "Beauty Products", composed by Andrzej Korzyński.
- "Puppet Talk" contains samples of "First Gymnopédie", composed by Erik Satie.
- "Tree Tunnels 3" contains samples of "Falcon Love Call (Armazém No. 2)", performed by Azymuth.
- "Wake Me" contains samples of "Don't Be Gone" by Chicago Gangsters.
