= Ghost People =

Studio album by Martyn
- Released: October 10, 2011
- Genre: Electronic
- Length: 46:12
- Label: Brainfeeder
- Producer: Martyn

Martyn chronology
Great Lengths (2009)	Ghost People (2011)	The Air Between Words (2014)

Singles from Ghost People
- 1. "Masks / Viper" Released: 2011

Professional ratings
Aggregate scores
Source	Rating
Metacritic	76/100
Review scores
Source	Rating
AllMusic	4.5/5 stars
BBC	favorable
Clash	8/10
Dusted Magazine	favorable
Exclaim!	favorable
Fact	3/5
Pitchfork	7.2/10
Resident Advisor	4/5 stars
The Skinny	4/5 stars

Ghost People is the second studio album by Martyn. It was released on Brainfeeder on October 10, 2011. It peaked at number 32 on the UK Dance Albums Chart.

== Critical reception ==
At Metacritic, which assigns a weighted average score out of 100 to reviews from mainstream critics, the album received an average score of 76 based on 12 reviews, indicating "generally favorable reviews".

Daniel Sylvester of Exclaim! commented that "Martyn has done an excellent job giving each track its own distinctive character". Ben Donnelly of Dusted Magazine described the album as "a dance record unconcerned with pop songs or headphone dynamics". Matthew Bennett of BBC concluded in his review that: "From his eulogy of Detroit strings and deep beats, to London's ambiguous constant reinvention of bass culture, these are tracks that will hold their own in any city with DJs operating at the forefront of the shifting beat."

== Track listing ==
No.	Title	Length
1.	"Love and Machines" (featuring The Spaceape)	1:53
2.	"Viper"	2:38
3.	"Masks"	4:58
4.	"Distortions"	4:56
5.	"Popgun"	5:38
6.	"I Saw You at Tule Lake"	1:08
7.	"Ghost People"	4:32
8.	"Twice As"	4:06
9.	"Bauplan"	3:42
10.	"Horror Vacui"	4:04
11.	"We Are You in the Future"	8:42

== Personnel ==
Credits adapted from liner notes.

- Martyn – writing, production
- The Spaceape – vocals (on "Love and Machines")
- Daddy Kev – mastering
- Erosie – cover art
- Mnono.pl – cover photography
- Maria Eisl – portrait photography

== Charts ==
Chart	Peak position
UK Dance Albums (OCC)	32
