= Obsidian (Baths album) =

Studio album by Baths
- Released: May 28, 2013
- Genres: IDM; synth-pop; electronic pop
- Length: 43:16
- Label: Anticon
- Producer: Baths

Baths chronology
Pop Music/False B-Sides (2011)	Obsidian (2013)	Romaplasm (2017)

Singles from Obsidian
- 1. "Miasma Sky" Released: March 6, 2013

Obsidian is the second studio album by American electronic musician Baths, released on May 28, 2013, by Anticon. The album was preceded by the single "Miasma Sky" released on March 6, 2013.

Obsidian received generally positive acclaim from critics and gained a title of "best new music" by Pitchfork. It also peaked at number fifteen and sixteen on Billboard's Top Dance/Electronic Albums and Heatseekers Albums respectively.

== Background ==
Will Wiesenfield started work on some tracks of Obsidian before his debut album Cerulean. During touring and promotion of his first album, he became seriously ill with a serious case of E. coli. Wiesenfield said he "got really sad and sort of felt this momentum to try and make this darker record". He commented that behind the music, "there’s a very distorted, raw state of mind" and explained that "it's this dichotomy. It's pop music, but it’s tragic and dark.”

== Critical reception ==
Professional ratings
Aggregate scores
Source	Rating
AnyDecentMusic?	7.4/10
Metacritic	76/100
Review scores
Source	Rating
AllMusic	4.5/5 stars
Clash	8/10
Consequence of Sound	3.5/5 stars
DIY	7/10
Exclaim!	9/10
Fact	4.5/5 stars
Pitchfork	8.6/10
PopMatters	7/10 stars
Slant Magazine	4/5 stars
Sputnikmusic	4.0/5

Obsidian received positive reviews from contemporary music critics. At Metacritic, which assigns a normalized rating out of 100 to reviews from mainstream critics, the album received an average score of 76, based on 22 reviews, which indicates "generally favorable reviews". Ian Cohen of Pitchfork praised the album saying "the gregarious and genial Wiesenfeld has created a more subversive work by getting uncomfortably close to pop." Vincent Pollard rated the album 9 out of 10, while writing in his review that "Obsidian is a gorgeous suite of electronic pop songs that will draw you in and stay with you for days on end." Slant Magazine described the music on the album as IDM. PopMatters's Robin Smith stated that Obsidian is a "self-sufficient synth-pop record in the vein of the Postal Service’s Give Up, ploughing through its songs and laying his beats as paths for stories."

== Track listing ==
All tracks are written by Will Wiesenfeld.

No.	Title	Length
1.	"Worsening"	4:26
2.	"Miasma Sky"	4:34
3.	"Ironworks"	4:40
4.	"Ossuary"	3:52
5.	"Incompatible"	4:40
6.	"No Eyes"	4:14
7.	"Phaedra"	4:52
8.	"No Past Lives"	3:40
9.	"Earth Death"	4:34
10.	"Inter"	3:50
Total length:		43:16

== Charts ==
Chart	Peak position
Top Dance/Electronic Albums	15
Heatseekers Albums	16

== Personnel ==
Credits adapted from the liner notes of Obsidian.

=== Musicians ===
- Will Wiesenfield – performance
- Ryan Satoru Studer – cello
- Luke Silas – drums (track 9)
- Amir Yaghmai – violin (tracks 5, 9)
- Andy Studer – violin (tracks 5, 9)
- Emily Call – violin (tracks 1–3, 10)
- Georgi Dimitrov – violin (tracks 1, 3)

=== Technical personnel ===
- Mario Luna – engineering
- Daddy Kev – mastering

=== Artwork ===
- Folder – design, typography
- Alex Takacs – art direction
