= Ryat =

American singer

- Born: New Jersey, U.S.
- Origin: Los Angeles, California, U.S.
- Genres: Electronica; jazz
- Occupations: Multi-instrumentalist; record producer; composer; vocalist
- Years active: 2006–current
- Labels: Obvious Bandits; Brainfeeder; Unspeakable Records
- Formerly of: As Human

Ryat (often stylized as RYAT is a New York City based Music producer, Multi-instrumentalist and Interdisciplinary Artist. She has released music on Brainfeeder, Ninja Tune.

== Career ==
RYAT began in 2006 in Philadelphia, where she met DJ/producer King Britt, who encouraged her to produce her own music using Ableton Live. She studied music programming, producing and hosted improvisation sessions playing with the older jazz fusion artists, Calvin Westin and Elliot Levin . Taylor McFerrin inspired her to create a live producers set up with Ableton, inspiring her to loop her music productions live. She met jazz musician, Tim Conley at a jam session at his house and started a band called As Human. After their band As Human split, she asked Conley to join her on tour.

In 2009, Ryat released the debut album, Street Noise Orkestra. Her second album, Avant Gold, was released in 2011. Her live show got the attention of Flying Lotus, who later invited her to join his label, Brainfeeder. She relocated to Los Angeles and was inspired by the natural surroundings and mysticism. Her third album, Totem, was released on the label in 2012. In 2015, she released music written for a Mixed Media show with dancers, projection mapping and interactive sensory technology, Alt Mode, which debuted in Central Park in 2015. RYAT announced a new album in 2025, coinciding with an Audio/Visual Exhibition.

== Style and influences ==
Ryat, is known for "maximalist production" in approach, often experimenting in electronics, vocal looping, and lush soundscapes. She has been compared with the artists like Björk. The music has been described as "beat couture".

== Discography ==
=== LPs ===
- Street Noise Orkestra (2009)
- Avant Gold (2011)
- Totem (2012)
- Alt Mode (2015)

=== Compilation albums ===
- Avant Gold Remixed (2011)
- Retrogrades B-Sides 2012-2014 (2018)
- Bedroom Demos (2018)

=== Guest appearances ===
- King Britt - "The Intricate Beauty" from The Intricate Beauty (2010)
- Lushlife - "Progress (Sun Glitters Reprise)" from Plateau Vision (2012)
- Soil & "Pimp" Sessions - "Kioku No Tabi" from Circles (2013)
- Botany - "Simple Creatures" from Lava Diviner (2013)
- Mast - "Until You Are Sound" from Omni (2014)
- Taylor McFerrin - "Place in My Heart" from Early Riser (2014)
- Botany - "Monthiversary" from Dimming Awe, the Light Is Raw (2015)
- Nadastrom - "Phantom Eyes" from Nadastrom (2015)
- Mast - "The Breakup" from Love and War (2016)
