= Family Portrait (album) =

Studio album by Ross from Friends
- Released: 27 July 2018
- Genre: Electronic
- Length: 53:13
- Label: Brainfeeder
- Producer: Ross from Friends

Ross from Friends chronology
Family Portrait (2018)	Tread (2021)

Family Portrait is the debut studio album by British electronic musician Ross from Friends. It was released on Brainfeeder on 27 July 2018.

== Critical reception ==
Professional ratings
Aggregate scores
Source	Rating
AnyDecentMusic?	7.3/10
Metacritic	77/100
Review scores
Source	Rating
AllMusic	4/5 stars
Clash	8/10
Exclaim!	8/10
MusicOMH	3/5 stars
NME	4/5 stars
Pitchfork	6.5/10
PopMatters	8/10
Q	4/5 stars
Resident Advisor	3.8/5
Rolling Stone	3.5/5 stars

At Metacritic, which assigns a weighted average score out of 100 to reviews from mainstream critics, the album received an average score of 77, based on 14 reviews, indicating "generally favorable reviews".

Paul Simpson of AllMusic gave the album 4 out of 5 stars, writing, "Like his older releases, this one favors grainy textures and sentimental vocal samples, but the beats are more broken this time out, drawing from electro and new wave rather than just the evenly paced pulse of house." He described it as "an uncommonly original album, keeping listeners guessing while making a significant, sometimes unexpected emotional impact."

=== Accolades ===
Publication	Accolade	Rank	Ref.
Mixmag	Top 50 Albums of 2018	9	
NME	Top 100 Albums of 2018	51	

== Track listing ==
All tracks are written by Ross from Friends, except saxophone on "Thank God I'm a Lizard" and "Don't Wake Dad" written by John Dunk.

No.	Title	Length
1.	"Happy Birthday Nick"	1:37
2.	"Thank God I'm a Lizard"	5:06
3.	"Wear Me Down"	5:19
4.	"The Knife"	3:33
5.	"Project Cybersyn"	5:09
6.	"Family Portrait"	1:42
7.	"Pale Blue Dot"	3:58
8.	"Back Into Space"	3:11
9.	"Parallel Sequence"	5:23
10.	"R.A.T.S."	5:29
11.	"Don't Wake Dad"	6:52
12.	"The Beginning"	5:54

Japanese edition CD bonus track
No.	Title	Length
13.	"Memento Mori"	4:23

== Personnel ==
Credits adapted from liner notes.

- Ross from Friends – production
- Daddy Kev – mastering engineer
- John Dunk – saxophone (2, 11)
- Lee Marshall – artwork

== Charts ==
Chart performance for Family Portrait
Chart (2018)	Peak position
Belgian Albums (Ultratop Flanders)	151
UK Dance Albums (Official Charts)	20
