= Outmind =

Studio album by Matthewdavid
- Released: April 19, 2011
- Genre: Electronic
- Length: 31:15
- Label: Brainfeeder
- Producer: Matthewdavid

Matthewdavid chronology
Outmind (2011)	In My World (2014)

Outmind is the first studio album by Matthewdavid. It was released on Brainfeeder on April 19, 2011.

== Production ==
It took four years for Matthewdavid to create the album. In a 2011 interview with Los Angeles Times, he said, "I think it's far-out enough to raise some questions from the listener, but it basically tells the story of my Los Angeles experience." The album includes guest appearances from Dogbite, Flying Lotus, and Niki Randa.

== Critical reception ==
Professional ratings
Review scores
Source	Rating
Consequence of Sound	B
Fact	3.5/5 stars
L.A. Record	favorable
The Line of Best Fit	mixed
MusicOMH	3/5 stars
Pitchfork	7.0/10
Resident Advisor	2.5/5

Keith Pishnery of Fact wrote, "In many ways, Outmind is one long, broken jam, but Matthewdavid succeeds in keeping the cacophony of disparate sound sources cohesive while maintaining a loose overall rhythm, just like the life and nature from which these sounds originate." Andrew Martin of Prefix commented that "The album features Matthewdavid's blending of dubstep, hip-hop, and electronic music with plenty of deconstructed samples and lo-fi ambient sounds thrown into the mix." Alex Young of Consequence of Sound described it as "a disorienting, never straightforward, and always inventive record whose every second is, for better or worse, unlike anything you'll hear all year."

== Track listing ==
No.	Title	Length
1.	"Los Angeles Is Beautiful"	1:42
2.	"Noche y Dia / San Raphael"	2:23
3.	"Prayers at Bedtime"	1:48
4.	"International" (featuring Dogbite)	3:03
5.	"Group Tea" (featuring Flying Lotus)	1:34
6.	"Like You Mean It"	3:22
7.	"Epic Swan"	1:44
8.	"Floor Music" (featuring Niki Randa)	2:07
9.	"Cucumber-Lime"	2:37
10.	"Today, the Same Way"	2:13
11.	"Being Without You"	1:58
12.	"No Need to Worry / Mean Too Much (Suite)"	6:50

== Personnel ==
Credits adapted from liner notes.

- Matthewdavid – music
- Dogbite – guest appearance (4)
- Flying Lotus – guest appearance (5)
- Niki Randa – guest appearance (8)
- Daddy Kev – mastering
- Miko Revereza – artwork
- Jesselisa – design
