= Estara =

Studio album by Teebs
- Released: April 8, 2014
- Genres: Instrumental hip-hop; ambient
- Length: 39:38
- Label: Brainfeeder
- Producer: Teebs

Teebs chronology
Ardour (2010)	Estara (2014)	Anicca (2019)

Estara (sometimes stylized as E s t a r a or E S T A R A) is the second studio album by Teebs. It was released on Brainfeeder on April 8, 2014. It features guest appearances from Jonti, Populous, Prefuse 73, and Lars Horntveth.

== Critical reception ==
Professional ratings
Aggregate scores
Source	Rating
Metacritic	68/100
Review scores
Source	Rating
AllMusic	4/5 stars
Clash	7/10
Consequence of Sound	C+
Exclaim!	8/10
Pitchfork	6.7/10
PopMatters	7/10 stars
Resident Advisor	3.5/5

At Metacritic, which assigns a weighted average score out of 100 to reviews from mainstream critics, the album received an average score of 68, based on 14 reviews, indicating "generally favorable reviews".

Nate Patrin of Pitchfork gave the album a 6.7 out of 10, writing, "Melancholy, bucolic relaxation, and agitated giddiness all run through this record, but its emotionally calming effect comes at the expense of anything truly revelatory or exciting." Tony Naylor of Resident Advisor gave the album a 3.5 out of 5, commenting that "Teebs employs dusty library music samples, astringent drones, twinkling percussion, punchy hip-hop drums and woody, autumnal tones to create defiantly utopian music."

== Track listing ==
No.	Title	Length
1.	"The Endless"	1:48
2.	"View Point"	2:39
3.	"Holiday" (featuring Jonti)	4:17
4.	"Shoouss Lullaby"	4:08
5.	"SOTM"	5:00
6.	"Hi Hat" (featuring Populous)	4:22
7.	"NY Pt. 1"	3:26
8.	"Piano Days"	1:22
9.	"Piano Months"	2:48
10.	"NY Pt. 2" (featuring Prefuse 73)	3:01
11.	"Mondaze"	1:57
12.	"Wavxxes" (featuring Lars Horntveth)	4:54

== Charts ==
Chart	Peak position
US Heatseekers Albums (Billboard)	39
US Top Dance Albums (Billboard)	19
