= Cosmic Cleavage =

Studio album by Busdriver
- Released: April 18, 2004
- Genre: Hip-hop
- Length: 29:37
- Label: Big Dada
- Producer: Daddy Kev

Busdriver chronology
| Temporary Forever (2002) | Cosmic Cleavage (2004) | Fear of a Black Tangent (2005) |

Cosmic Cleavage is the third studio album by American rapper Busdriver. It was released on Big Dada in 2004. The cover depicts an action figure of the Mazinger Z robot Aphrodite A firing its breast missiles.

== Critical reception ==
Professional ratings
Review scores
| Source | Rating |
|---|---|
| BBC | 3.5/5 stars |
| The Milk Factory | 4.1/5 |
| Pitchfork | 8/10 |
| Prefix | 6.0/10 |

Chris Dahlen of Pitchfork gave the album an 8.0 out of 10, saying: "With no breaks or gasps for air between the tracks, Cosmic Cleavage is Busdriver's tightest, most consistent album." However, he added, "it might not be the best starting place for new listeners." Paul Clarke of BBC gave the album 3.5 stars out of 5, describing it as "'acid jazz' in a literally hallucinogenic sense".

== Track listing ==
| No. | Title | Length |
|---|---|---|
| 1. | "Pool Drowning" | 2:06 |
| 2. | "Nagging Nimbus" | 2:31 |
| 3. | "Cosmic Cleavage" (featuring Awol One) | 2:04 |
| 4. | "Stingy Lover" | 0:45 |
| 5. | "Kev's Blistering Computer Tan and Driver's "Rapper's Rapper" Moniker" | 3:53 |
| 6. | "Unnecessary Thinking" (featuring Abstract Rude) | 2:08 |
| 7. | "Beauty Supply and Demand" | 2:03 |
| 8. | "She-Hulk Dehorning the Illusionist" | 2:51 |
| 9. | "Stride-Pianist Penis Envy" | 1:04 |
| 10. | "Purple Schards" | 2:00 |
| 11. | "Rap Sucks" | 1:41 |
| 12. | "Staring at the Sun" | 6:32 |
| Total length: | | 29:37 |

== Personnel ==
Credits adapted from liner notes.

- Busdriver – vocals
- Daddy Kev – production
- James Morris – bass guitar
- D-Styles – turntables
- Awol One – vocals (3)
- Abstract Rude – vocals (6)
