= You're Dead! =

Studio album by Flying Lotus
- Released: October 6, 2014
- Genres: Electronic; jazz; jazz fusion; hip-hop
- Length: 38:03
- Label: Warp
- Producer: Flying Lotus

Flying Lotus chronology
Ideas+drafts+loops (2013)	You're Dead! (2014)	Flamagra (2019)

Singles from You're Dead!
- 1. "Never Catch Me" Released: September 3, 2014

You're Dead! is the fifth studio album by American music producer Flying Lotus (Steven Ellison), released on October 6, 2014, by Warp Records. Flying Lotus recorded the album at his home in Los Angeles, using Ableton Live and other instruments and software. Like his previous two albums Cosmogramma and Until the Quiet Comes, You're Dead! features extensive contributions from Thundercat, who plays bass guitar on nearly every track and provides vocals on several. It also features guest performances from Angel Deradoorian, Niki Randa, Kendrick Lamar, Snoop Dogg, Kamasi Washington, Kimbra, and Herbie Hancock, along with Captain Murphy, Flying Lotus' rapper alter ego.

You're Dead was promoted with the single "Never Catch Me", which was nominated for Best Dance Recording at the 2016 Grammy Awards. Mainly an instrumental album, You're Dead! is described as electronic, jazz fusion and hip-hop. The album received widespread acclaim from critics, and peaked at number one on the US Dance/Electronic Albums and at number 19 on the US Billboard 200.

== Background and recording ==
Ellison and Thundercat developed the concept of the album. He said in an interview with Los Angeles Times:

[I was] driving my car with Thundercat, who plays bass on all the stuff. We were driving around listening to George Duke, and there was a moment when we were tripping on how crazy all that playing was. Well, why don't we make some [shit] like this now, that just kills everybody? When you hear it you're like, 'Oh [shit] you're dead!'"

Originally conceived as a double album, Ellison worked on the album soon after finishing his previous album, with the intent of creating "the fastest, hardest, most intense jazz record". Like his previous album, Until the Quiet Comes, he used both Ableton Live and live instruments to make the album. His music gear included Moog Voyager, Fender Rhodes, and Wurlitzer electric pianos, as well as a Gibson guitar, a Carvin Legacy 3 all-tube 3-channel amp head, a bank of six Moogerfooger analog effects modules and two Technics SL-1200 turntables. Daddy Kev, who mastered the album, said that You're Dead! had the largest dynamic range of any of Ellison's work.

== Music ==
You're Dead! is an electronic, jazz, jazz fusion and hip-hop album. It is also a concept album about death and afterlife. In an interview with Electronic Musician, Ellison said, "It's like, 'Hey, you're dead, who knows what's next, but our spirits live forever, and you lived through the good and bad sh*t,' not, 'Hey, you're dead, it's over.'" The album has complex melodies, syncopated rhythms, and textured productions.

"Theme", initially called "Jodorowsky", was the song that led into the concept of the album. "Cold Dead" started with an iPhone voice memo. "Stirring" is a homage to Ellison's friend Nick Terry, who had then-recently died. "Coronus, the Terminator" was the first song Ellison made in his new home; "Siren Song" was written for Pharrell. "Eyes Above" has a beat that he created with FKA Twigs and Niki Randa. "The Beyond", dedicated to "an unborn child", is inspired by Fantastic Planet. According to Ellison, "Fkn Dead" was the most difficult song on the album to make, but the arrangement for "Turkey Dog Coma" was the most complex. In "The Boys Who Died in Their Sleep", Ellison raps, under his alias Captain Murphy, about "being comfortable in a cloud where nothing ever happens", while naming OxyContin, Vicodin and Xanax.

== Artwork ==
The cover art for You're Dead! was designed by Japanese manga artist Shintaro Kago on the cover and inner sleeve, with further art being utilised in the accompanying live show. Much of the drawings featured men and women being disfigured and mutilated in unrealistic, hi-tech ways with a significant amount of gore and nudity.

== Release ==
The album's title and release date were announced on July 22, 2014. On October 7, 2015, Flying Lotus released a deluxe version of the album containing the instrumentals and the previously Japanese exclusive bonus track "Protector".

== Critical reception ==
Professional ratings
Aggregate scores
Source	Rating
AnyDecentMusic?	8.4/10
Metacritic	88/100
Review scores
Source	Rating
AllMusic	5/5 stars
The A.V. Club	A−
The Guardian	5/5 stars
The Irish Times	4/5 stars
Mojo	4/5 stars
NME	8/10
The Observer	5/5 stars
Pitchfork	8.3/10
Q	4/5 stars
Rolling Stone	4/5 stars

You're Dead! was met with widespread critical acclaim. At Metacritic, which assigns a normalized rating out of 100 to reviews from professional publications, the album received an average score of 88, based on 36 reviews. Aggregator AnyDecentMusic? gave it 8.4 out of 10, based on their assessment of the critical consensus.

Andy Kellman of AllMusic stated, "Like his great aunt, and his great uncle John Coltrane, Ellison has created exceptionally progressive, stirring, and eternal art." Clayton Purdom of The A.V. Club stated, "You're Dead! is his most confidently structured work yet." Matthew Bennett of Clash stated, "This, his fifth album, is also an overt ode to limbo, the halfway house of consciousness and true death. And this is where all 19 tracks dwell, in between the failing light of traditional jazz and the bursts of neon emitted from his polyrhythmic, nocturnal electronica." Adam Kivel of Consequence of Sound stated, "The album works best as a single, unified listen." In a glowing review for The Guardian Paul MacInnes said, "There's always been a sense that Ellison was stretching for a new musical vernacular, one that would continue the lineage of free jazz (he is the great-nephew of Alice Coltrane). This album suggests he might have found it." Chris Cottingham of NME stated, "You're Dead! is a madly inventive record, one that takes hip-hop and jazz as starting points, beats them both to death and then brings them back to life in an almost unrecognisable form." Logan Smithson of PopMatters stated, "You're Dead! is arguably his most imposing album thus far."

Nate Patrin of Pitchfork stated, "Flying Lotus has the notion that death should be the only limiting factor, and when he's put out a work that wrings beauty out of that very thing, what's the point of fearing anything?" Will Hermes of Rolling Stone stated, "Ellison makes the boldest, most fully engaged fusion of the hip-hop-laptop era." Franklin Jones of Slant Magazine stated, "While it may not be clear where we're headed throughout the album, Ellison maneuvers through the bedlam with such confidence that it's not just easy to get swept up in his grand vision of the Great Beyond, but to return for repeat visits." Michael Blair of XXL applauded the album overall saying, "The genius of Flying Lotus, which has been invariably present throughout his preceding releases, but most especially on You’re Dead!, is that he has an incredible ability to both illustrate and extract exceptional amounts of emotion, without saying much at all." Staff writer at Exclaim! Stephen Carlickm described the album as, "Excitingly new yet classically evocative, You're Dead! is contemplative but never boring, an example of genre cross-pollination that transcends novelty and, occasionally, time and space as well." Robert Christgau was less enthusiastic in his column for Cuepoint, citing "Turkey Dog Coma" and "Ready err Not" as highlights and writing, "The problem isn't that it's less than the sum of its parts—the problem is that there is no sum, only parts".

=== Accolades ===
Year-end lists for You're Dead!
Publication	Accolade	Rank	Ref.
The A.V. Club	Top 20 Albums of 2014	9	
Clash	Top 40 Albums of 2014	2	
Entertainment Weekly	Top 10 Albums of 2014	6	
Gorilla vs. Bear	Top 35 Albums of 2014	12	
The Guardian	Top 40 Albums of 2014	9	
Pitchfork	Top 50 Albums of 2014	17	
PopMatters	Top 80 Albums of 2014	3	
Rolling Stone	Top 50 Albums of 2014	11	
Sputnikmusic	Top 50 Albums of 2014	1	

== Commercial performance ==
The album debuted at number 19 on the US Billboard 200, with first-week sales of 17,000 copies in the United States. In its second week, the album dropped to number 67 on the chart, selling 5,000 copies, bringing its total album sales to 22,000 copies.

== Track listing ==
All tracks produced by Flying Lotus.

You're Dead! track listing
No.	Title	Writer(s)	Length
1.	"Theme"	Steven Ellison	1:24
2.	"Tesla"	Ellison; Stephen Bruner; Herbie Hancock	1:54
3.	"Cold Dead"	Ellison; Bruner; Kamasi Washington	1:34
4.	"Fkn Dead"	Ellison; Bruner	0:40
5.	"Never Catch Me" (featuring Kendrick Lamar)	Ellison; Kendrick Duckworth	3:54
6.	"Dead Man's Tetris" (featuring Captain Murphy and Snoop Dogg)	Ellison; Calvin Broadus	2:25
7.	"Turkey Dog Coma"	Ellison; Bruner	3:09
8.	"Stirring"	Ellison; Jeff Lynne	0:30
9.	"Coronus, the Terminator"	Ellison; Niki Randa	2:40
10.	"Siren Song" (featuring Angel Deradoorian)	Ellison; Angel Deradoorian	2:37
11.	"Turtles"	Ellison; Bruner	2:06
12.	"Ready err Not"	Ellison	1:45
13.	"Eyes Above"	Ellison	1:12
14.	"Moment of Hesitation"	Ellison; Washington; Hancock	2:18
15.	"Descent into Madness" (featuring Thundercat)	Ellison; Bruner	1:27
16.	"The Boys Who Died in Their Sleep" (featuring Captain Murphy)	Ellison	1:50
17.	"Obligatory Cadence"	Ellison	2:56
18.	"Your Potential // The Beyond" (featuring Niki Randa)	Ellison; Randa	1:45
19.	"The Protest"	Ellison	1:57
Total length:			38:03

Japanese, vinyl edition, and deluxe edition bonus track
No.	Title	Writer(s)	Length
20.	"Protector"	Ellison	2:12
Total length:			40:15

Notes

- "Dead Man's Tetris" features uncredited vocals by Earl Sweatshirt

Sample credits

- "Turtles" contains a sample of "L'Uccello Dalle Piume Di Cristallo" composed and performed by Ennio Morricone.
- "Obligatory Cadence" contains a sample of "Green Dew" composed by C. Staker, performed by The French Ensemble.

== Personnel ==
Credits adapted from the album's liner notes.

Musicians

- Flying Lotus (Note: Flying Lotus is credited not only as Flying Lotus, but also as Steven Ellison, his birth name, and Captain Murphy, an alias he uses for rapping. These credits put all of Ellison's credits in one, despite the various credited names.) – keyboards (tracks 1–9, 16, 19), sampling (tracks 1–3), backing vocals (tracks 1, 3–5, 17, 18), percussion (tracks 4, 15), synthesizers (track 6), vocals (tracks 6, 9, 15, 19)
- Justin Brown – drums (track 7)
- Ronald Bruner – drums (track 3)
- Taylor Cannizzaro – strings (track 18)
- Brandon Coleman – keyboards (tracks 3, 4, 7, 10, 11)
- Gene Coye – drums (tracks 2, 4, 14)
- Laura Darlington – flute (track 15), vocals (track 19)
- Angel Deradoorian – vocals (track 10), backing vocals (track 17)
- Arlene Deradoorian – backing vocals (tracks 10, 17)
- Miguel Atwood Ferguson – strings (tracks 7, 15, 19)
- Taylor Graves – keyboards (track 19)
- Herbie Hancock – keyboards (tracks 2, 14)
- Kimbra Johnson – vocals (track 19)
- Kendrick Lamar – vocals (track 5)
- Jeff Lynne – guitar (track 8)
- Deantoni Parks – drums (tracks 1, 5, 9, 10, 13, 19)
- Niki Randa – backing vocals (tracks 1, 10, 17), percussion (track 7), vocals
- Andres Renteria – percussion (tracks 1, 4, 7, 10, 14)
- Brendon Small – guitar (tracks 7, 10)
- Snoop Dogg – vocals (track 6)
- Thundercat – bass guitar (tracks 1–13, 15–19), guitar (track 4), backing vocals (tracks 5, 7, 17), vocals (track 15)
- Kamasi Washington – saxophone (tracks 1, 3, 7, 14), keyboards (track 1)

Production

- Flying Lotus – producer
- Daddy Kev – mastering
- Derek "MixedByAli" Ali – vocal mixing for Kendrick Lamar (track 5)
- Rich Costey – mixing (track 14)
- Martin Cooke – assistant engineer (track 14)
- Nicolas Fournier – assistant engineer (track 14)
- Mario Borgatta – mixing assistant (track 14)

Design

- Stephen Serrato – design
- Shintaro Kago – illustrations

== Charts ==
=== Weekly charts ===
Chart performance for You're Dead!
Chart (2014)	Peak position
Australian Albums (ARIA)	48
Austrian Albums (Ö3 Austria)	68
Belgian Albums (Ultratop Flanders)	29
Belgian Albums (Ultratop Wallonia)	76
Dutch Albums (Album Top 100)	55
French Albums (SNEP)	157
German Albums (Offizielle Top 100)	77
New Zealand Albums (RMNZ)	35
Swiss Albums (Schweizer Hitparade)	50
UK Albums (Official Charts)	24
US Billboard 200	19
US Top Dance Albums (Billboard)	1

=== Year-end charts ===
2014 year-end chart performance for You're Dead!
Chart (2014)	Position
US Top Dance/Electronic Albums (Billboard)	19

2015 year-end chart performance for You're Dead!
Chart (2015)	Position
US Top Dance/Electronic Albums (Billboard)	25
