= Pop Music/False B-Sides =

Compilation album by Baths
- Released: February 2, 2011
- Genre: Electronic, experimental, glitch
- Length: 42:00
- Label: Anticon

Baths chronology
Cerulean (2010)	Pop Music/False B-Sides (2011)	Obsidian (2013)

Professional ratings
Review scores
Source	Rating
Mixmag	4/5 stars
Pitchfork	7.4/10

Pop Music/False B-Sides is a compilation album by American electronic musician Baths. It was released during his 2011 tour.

In an interview with Blue Indian, Baths stated, "It’s original songs that happened after Cerulean. It’s sort of like an umbrella release for all those different things."

== Track listing ==
No.	Title	Length
1.	"Pop Song"	3:26
2.	"Overseas"	2:03
3.	"Nordic Laurel"	4:06
4.	"Turian Courtship"	4:08
5.	"Somerset"	2:13
6.	"Seaside Town"	3:20
7.	"Tatami"	3:55
8.	"Flux"	3:50
9.	"Stupor"	1:48
10.	"Iniuria Palace"	4:21
11.	"Lovesick Synthetic"	2:48
12.	"The Vapors"	2:57
13.	"Damnation"	3:07
