= The Weather (Busdriver, Radioinactive and Daedelus album) =

Studio album by Busdriver & Radioinactive with Daedelus
- Released: February 18, 2003
- Genre: Hip-hop
- Length: 60:47
- Label: Mush Records
- Producer: Daedelus

Professional ratings
Review scores
Source	Rating
AllMusic	2/5 stars
Dusted Magazine	unfavorable
East Bay Express	favorable
Exclaim!	mixed
Pitchfork	8.5/10
Robert Christgau	(dud)
Stylus Magazine	D

The Weather is a collaborative studio album by Busdriver & Radioinactive with Daedelus. It was released on Mush Records on February 18, 2003.

Daedelus released a reworking instrumental version of the album, titled Rethinking the Weather, on Mush Records on June 10, 2003.

== Critical reception ==
Julianne Shepherd of Pitchfork praised the album, writing, "The Weather is smart but not pretentious, skeptical but not misanthropic, and it proves avant-hiphop doesn't have to be avant-crappy." Meanwhile, Fredrick Thomas of Stylus Magazine criticized the album's consistency, writing: "It's not that any track on the album is actually bad when compared to artists doing similar work – it's just that it does nothing to differentiate them from the pack."

Eric K. Arnold of East Bay Express said, "Busdriver and Radioinactive's rhyming cadences owe a debt to both Freestyle Fellowship and Latyrx, while Daedelus' lo-fi Casio tones could qualify him for at least a charter membership in Anticon."

== Track listing ==
No.	Title	Length
1.	"Exaggerated Joy"	3:08
2.	"Pen's Oil"	4:27
3.	"Carl Weathers"	4:35
4.	"Glorified Hype Man"	3:34
5.	"Fine for a Robot"	4:44
6.	"Germs That May Cause the Following"	2:42
7.	"Weather Locklear"	4:17
8.	"Break for 2300"	2:25
9.	"DJ Furry"	2:50
10.	"Raffle Ticket Blues"	4:06
11.	"Sleep Standing Up"	2:28
12.	"Name Forgetter"	5:00
13.	"Thousand Words"	7:00
14.	"Fizzing Energy Drink"	0:23
15.	"Barely Music"	9:06

== Personnel ==
Credits adapted from liner notes.

- Busdriver – vocals, jacket zipper (2), party noisemaker (2)
- Radioinactive – vocals, gargle (5)
- Daedelus – production
- DJ ESP – turntables
- Rhetteric – vocals (4)
- Anita Qureshi – vocals (5)
- Myka 9 – whistle (7)
- Awol One – vocals (15)
- 2Mex – vocals (15)
- Circus – vocals (15)
- Daddy Kev – mixing
