= Gut (album) =

Studio album by Baths
- Released: February 21, 2025
- Genres: Indie rock; electropop
- Length: 53:00
- Label: Basement's Basement
- Producer: Will Wiesenfeld

Baths chronology
Romaplasm (2017)	Gut (2025)

Singles from Gut
- 1. "Sea of Men" Released: December 11, 2024; 2. "Eden" Released: January 15, 2025

Gut is the fourth studio album by American electronic musician Baths. It was released by Basement's Basement on February 21, 2025. It marks his first album in seven years, since his album Romaplasm in 2017. Gut was promoted with the release of its lead single "Sea of Men".

== Background and release ==
On December 11, 2024, Wiesenfeld announced that his upcoming album Gut was set to be released on February 21, 2025. According to Pitchfork, Wiesenfeld started working on the project before the pandemic started, and finished it on 2022. About Gut, Wiesenfeld stated that he was "trying to make my feelings make sense by not initially psychoanalyzing them, by instead just having feelings said and put on the table".

In an interview with Justin Moran for the magazine Paper, Wiesenfeld described Gut as an "immediate, nude, adult (and unadulterated), relentless, angry" record, and explained its concept, saying:

"I had to come to terms with how intensely sex governs my thinking, in all aspects of my life. Like I’m proudly out and gay and all of that, but it’s still embarrassing how pervasive my sexual thoughts are, or my self-analysis and criticism of those thoughts. Making a new record that reflected something honest about the most recent chapter of my life meant addressing those feelings, living inside of them — attempting to understand my sexuality and isolation by not diluting how those things exist for me, and chasing that same immediacy with the lyrics."

— Wiesenfeld explaining Gut to Justin Moran, on Paper

== Reception ==
Professional ratings
Review scores
Source	Rating
AllMusic	4.5/5 stars
Spectrum Culture	82%
PopMatters	8/10
Pitchfork	7.9/10
Jenesaispop	7.6/10

Gut was met with critical acclaim. Pitchfork's Eric Torres deemed it as "one of the most fully realized and exhilarating Baths albums to date", praising its "astonishing vulnerability". Similarly, Brian Stout of PopMatters hailed it as a "beautiful" and "potent" record, with some of Wiesenfeld's "warmest", and "most inviting" songs to date, made by such a "singular artist".

Writing for AllMusic, Heather Phares considered the record as a combination of the "maturity and depth" present on Wiesenfeld's previous work, with the "spontaneity of a beginner", making an "impressive" and "expressive" record, which showcases Wiesenfeld's "eloquent" and "hungry" artistic evolution.

== Track listing ==
All tracks are written by Will Wiesenfeld.

No.	Title	Length
1.	"Eyewall"	5:08
2.	"Sea of Men"	4:06
3.	"Peacocking"	3:42
4.	"Eden"	4:56
5.	"Homosexuals"	5:10
6.	"Cedar Stairwell"	4:16
7.	"American Mythos"	4:07
8.	"Chaos"	5:10
9.	"Governed"	5:05
10.	"Verity"	4:05
11.	"The Sound of a Blooming Flower"	7:09
Total length:		53:00

== Credits ==
Credits adapted from Baths' Bandcamp page.

- Will Wiesenfeld — vocals; performer; songwriter; composer; live drums (tracks 1, 2, 7); arrangement; mixing; layout
- Sam Kaufman-Skloff — performer and engineer
- Casey Deitz — performer and engineer (tracks 3, 8, 10); drum samples (tracks 5, 10, 11); strings (tracks 2, 4, 5, 6, 7, 9, 10, 11)
- Phil Hartunian — engineer (at Tropico Beauty)
- Isaura String Quartet — performers
  - Emily Call — violin
  - Madeline Falcone — violin
  - Betsy Rettig — cello
  - Rita Isabel Andrade — viola
- Heyshiro Matsuoka / 松岡平四郎 — art
- Paige Batson — management
- Heba Kadry — mastering

== Release history ==
Release dates and formats for Gut
Region	Date	Format	Label	Ref.
Various	February 21, 2025	Vinyl; digital download; streaming	Basement's Basement	

== See also ==
- List of 2025 albums
