= Sold Out (DJ Paypal album) =

Studio album by DJ Paypal
- Released: November 13, 2015
- Genre: Footwork
- Length: 38:48
- Label: Brainfeeder
- Producer: DJ Paypal, DJ Earl, Feloneezy, Jackie Dagger, Nangdo, DJ Taye, Keiska, Tielsie

DJ Paypal chronology
Buy Now (2015)	Sold Out (2015)	174.2.2 (2018)

Sold Out is the debut studio album by DJ Paypal. (Note: Resident Advisor states that it is an album. Meanwhile, Pitchfork states that it is a mini-album.) It was released by Brainfeeder on November 13, 2015. It is a record in the Chicago footwork style of dance music.

== Production ==
Paypal described it as intended to sound both beautiful and 'fucking hilarious' in an interview to Pitchfork: "Humor is the yin and yang that's missing from a lot of music. Either people take themselves way too seriously, or it's entirely a joke. I don't see it mixed together very often."

== Critical reception ==
Professional ratings
Aggregate scores
Source	Rating
Metacritic	77/100
Review scores
Source	Rating
Clash	8/10
Consequence of Sound	B
Exclaim!	7/10
Mixmag	10/10
Pitchfork	7.9/10
PopMatters	7/10 stars
Rolling Stone	3.5/5 stars
Spin	7/10
Tiny Mix Tapes	4/5 stars

At Metacritic, which assigns a weighted average score out of 100 to reviews from mainstream critics, Sold Out received an average score of 77% based on 10 reviews, indicating "generally favorable reviews".

Colin Joyce of Spin wrote: "You'll get no closer to ascertaining his actual identity, but as the balance between jokes and earnest emoting narrows, Sold Out presents something of an abstract portrait of the man behind the haze." Ashley Hampson of Exclaim! described it as "an expansive take on footwork, incorporating expressive elements of soul, hip-hop and, most notably, jazz."

Paper included it on the "10 Most Underrated Albums of 2015" list. PopMatters placed it at number 17 on the "Best Electronic Music of 2015" list.

== Track listing ==
No.	Title	Length
1.	"Sold Out"	3:46
2.	"Ahhhhhhh"	5:37
3.	"Slim Trak"	4:02
4.	"Awakening"	3:55
5.	"We Finally Made It" (featuring DJ Earl)	2:53
6.	"With Uuuuuuu" (featuring Feloneezy and Jackie Dagger)	5:13
7.	"On a Cloud" (featuring Nangdo and DJ Taye)	4:06
8.	"Say Goodbye" (featuring Keiska and Tielsie)	7:27
Total length:		38:48
