= Free Kamal =

Studio album by Radioinactive and Antimc
- Released: June 29, 2004
- Genre: Hip-hop
- Length: 48:26
- Label: Mush Records
- Producer: Antimc

Professional ratings
Review scores
Source	Rating
AllMusic	3.5/5 stars
Brainwashed	mixed
Dusted Magazine	favorable
Exclaim!	favorable
Pitchfork	7.7/10
PopMatters	favorable

Free Kamal is a collaborative studio album by Radioinactive and Antimc. It was released on Mush Records in 2004. It debuted at number 35 on CMJ's Hip Hop chart.

== Critical reception ==
Brian Howe of Pitchfork gave the album a 7.7 out of 10, saying, "While its themes are often serious, Free Kamal is giddy and upbeat, a bright ray of SoCal summer." Meanwhile, Justin Cober-Lake of PopMatters said, "They usually match clever lyrics to interesting beats, and their missteps are a somewhat natural part of taking creative chances."

== Track listing ==
No.	Title	Length
1.	"With Light Within"	3:52
2.	"Chop Chop"	3:03
3.	"Movin' Truck"	4:25
4.	"First World Justice System"	4:35
5.	"The Weight of Secrets"	3:46
6.	"Citrus"	3:06
7.	"Stop Me Equals Death"	2:29
8.	"The Physics of My Success"	4:05
9.	"Running with Scissors"	4:20
10.	"Dinosaur Eggs"	4:03
11.	"Folding Dirty Laundry"	4:01
12.	"Magnets"	6:41
