= Lily Perdida =

Studio album by Clue to Kalo
- Released: 20 January 2009
- Length: 40:57
- Label: Mush Records

Clue to Kalo chronology
One Way, It's Every Way (2005)	Lily Perdida (2009)

Lily Perdida is the third studio album by Clue to Kalo. It was released through Mush Records on 20 January 2009. The album tells the story of the title character from the perspective of those around her.

== Production ==
Clue to Kalo's Mark Mitchell says of the album's concept:

I wanted to make a folk record which was about one particular person based on what everyone else was saying about them. I read a lot of old traditional song lyrics and absorbed the language that was used. A lot of key words came up in these songs, so I wanted to have echoes of that language, but take it out of its context and use it in a modern story.

== Critical reception ==
Professional ratings
Aggregate scores
Source	Rating
Metacritic	72/100
Review scores
Source	Rating
AllMusic	3.5/5 stars
Cokemachineglow	55%
Exclaim!	favorable
No Ripcord	8/10
PopMatters	7/10 stars
Spectrum Culture	1.5/5
XLR8R	mixed

At Metacritic, which assigns a weighted average score out of 100 to reviews from mainstream critics, the album received an average score of 72, based on 4 reviews, indicating "generally favorable reviews".

Alan Ranta of PopMatters gave the album 7 stars out of 10, stating, "It is [Mark] Mitchell's most organic fusion yet, dripping with indie psychedelia through delicate melodies of acoustic guitar, harpsichord, flute, and anything under the stairs he could squeeze through his soundcard." He added, "It's as impressive as it is warm and charming." Ian Gormely of Exclaim! commented that "this cycle of heavy-hearted pop tunes is spiritually reminiscent of '60s concept records like Pet Sounds and Odessey and Oracle — fun and heartbreaking all at once." Dominic Umile of XLR8R wrote, "This is a dense, challenging ride, where the search for the big hooks is sometimes derailed by an onslaught of smaller ones."

== Track listing ==
No.	Title	Length
1.	"Lull for Dear Life" (By the Parents)	4:20
2.	"User to a Carrier" (By the Sister)	3:57
3.	"Hail to the Full Release" (By the Boy)	3:35
4.	"It's Here the Story's Straight" (By the Peers)	3:30
5.	"Mine Disaster After Theirs" (By the Brother)	4:21
6.	"The Infinite Orphan" (By the Familiars)	3:34
7.	"Of Him on Her Heels" (By the Narrator)	4:47
8.	"What Went Down Around" (By the Eavesdropper)	2:22
9.	"Which Notice to Your Next of Kin?" (By the Confidante)	5:37
10.	"All's Made Meaning" (By the Chorus)	4:54
Total length:		40:57

== Personnel ==
Credits adapted from liner notes.

- Mark Mitchell – music
- Ellen Carey – additional music
- Curtis Leaver – additional music
- Vic Conrad – additional music
- Cornel Wilczek – additional music
- Martin Butler – additional music
- Emilie Flierl – additional music
- Alan Beverley – additional music
