= Hakushi Hasegawa =

Japanese electronic J-pop musician

Hakushi Hasegawa 長谷川白紙
- Born: December 21, 1998 (age 27); Tokyo, Japan
- Genres: Electronica; nu jazz; breakcore; j-pop; progressive pop
- Occupation: Singer-songwriter
- Instruments: Vocals, piano, synthesizers
- Years active: 2016–present
- Labels: Maltine Records (2017); Musicmine (2018–2020); Brainfeeder (2023–present)
- Website: hakushihasegawa.com

Hakushi Hasegawa (Japanese: 長谷川白紙, Hepburn: Hasegawa Hakushi; born December 21, 1998) is a Japanese singer-songwriter born in Tokyo, Japan. After releasing music on SoundCloud and signing to netlabel Maltine Records, they made their debut with the release of their first EP, iPhone Six Plus, in 2016. They followed this up with their second EP, Somoku Hodo, in 2018 and their debut album, Air Ni Ni, in 2019, as well as a cover album, Bones of Dreams Attacked!, in 2020. In 2023, Hasegawa signed to American record label Brainfeeder and released their third original album, Mahōgakkō, in 2024.

Hasegawa is nonbinary and uses they/them pronouns.

== Early life ==
Hakushi Hasegawa was born in Tokyo, Japan on December 21, 1998. They began taking piano lessons at a young age and later in life found themself in online chatrooms discussing electronic music. There they were introduced to artists such as Nyolfen.

== Career ==
On August 31, 2016, Hasegawa released their debut single, Hadairo No Kawa (肌色の川, Flesh Colored River), on SoundCloud, which went viral in Japan, grabbing the attention of the founder of Maltine Records, Tomohiro Konuta, who would sign them to the label. A year later, Hasegawa would release their debut EP, iPhone Six Plus, through Maltine Records.

This got them the attention of independent record label Musicmine, which oversaw the release of Hasegawa's follow-up EP Somoku Hodo (2018). Less than a year later, Hasegawa released their debut album, Air Ni Ni, which garnered positive reviews, with multiple domestic outlets calling it their "Album of the Year".

Hasegawa performed at the Secret Sky Festival held by American musician Porter Robinson as a response to the restrictions COVID-19 put on live music.

In May 2020, Hasegawa released Bones of Dreams Attacked!. Described as a "stylistic U-Turn", the entire album is composed of stripped back cover versions of J-pop and J-rock songs, as well as a cover of "A Whole New World" from Disney's 1992 film Aladdin. Artists covered include bands such as Sōtaisei Riron, Sakanaction and Sambomaster, among others.

After drawing the attention of American producer Flying Lotus, Lotus invited Hasegawa to perform at his 2021 online live-music event The Hit. In July 2023, Hasegawa announced their signing to Flying Lotus' record label Brainfeeder. They are the first Japanese act to be signed by the label. In July 2023, Hasegawa released the single "Mouth Flash", enlisting the video production group Tsuribu Tokyo for a music video.

Hasegawa composed the soundtrack for the Japanese drama I am Dead!, directed by Makoto Nagahisa. It was released on October 4, 2023.

May 2024 saw the release of two singles for the upcoming album: "Boy's Texture" and "Departed". Both singles were accompanied by music videos animated by digital artist Gauspel. "Departed" also landed on Pitchfork's "Selects", a weekly curated playlist. On July 24, 2024, Hasegawa released their third original album Mahōgakkō. In an interview for Bandcamp, Hasegawa talks about their newfound interest in experimenting with their voice, citing Alvin Lucier's I am sitting in a room as inspiration. In the same interview, they describe Mahōgakkō as "meaner" than their earlier work and voice the prediction that it will "likely go down as [their] most disorganized, distorted [and] chaotic album".

== Influences ==
Hasegawa cited labelmates Iglooghost, Jameszoo, Thundercat and Hiatus Kaiyote as musical and creative influences, as well as J-pop singers Aiko and Ken Hirai.

== Discography ==
=== Studio albums ===
- 2019 – Air Ni Ni
- 2020 – Bones of Dreams Attacked!
- 2023 – I Am Dead! (Original Soundtrack)
- 2024 – Mahōgakkō
- 2026 – Honest Feeling Album

=== EPs ===
- 2017 – iPhone Six Plus
- 2018 – Somoku Hodo

=== Singles ===
- 2016 – "Hadairo No Kawa"
- 2020 – "Otogasuru" (with yuigot)
- 2020 – "Sukuinote" (with Yukichikasaku/men)
- 2021 – "Uni"
- 2022 – "Thunder in Bud" (with KAF)
- 2024 – "Wonderful Christmastime"
