= Romaplasm =

Studio album by Baths
- Released: November 17, 2017
- Genres: Electronica; EDM; glitch; IDM
- Length: 47:16
- Label: Anticon
- Producer: Baths

Baths chronology
Obsidian (2013)	Romaplasm (2017)	Gut (2025)

Romaplasm is the third studio album by American electronic musician Baths. It was released by Anticon on November 17, 2017.

== Critical reception ==
Professional ratings
Aggregate scores
Source	Rating
Metacritic	73/100
Review scores
Source	Rating
Pitchfork	7.9/10
PopMatters	6/10 stars
The Skinny	4/5 stars

At Metacritic, which assigns a weighted average score out of 100 to reviews from mainstream critics, the album received an average score of 73 based on eight reviews, indicating "generally favorable reviews".

Christopher Laird of PopMatters gave the album 6 stars out of 10, calling it "[Baths'] most personal and reflective album to date." Sasha Geffen of Pitchfork gave the album a 7.9 out of 10, saying, "Without abandoning the conundrums that made Obsidian so emotionally indelible, he's embellished the worlds of his songs with color from the dreams in which he's immersed himself over the years."

== Track listing ==
No.	Title	Length
1.	"Yeoman"	4:28
2.	"Extrasolar"	4:37
3.	"Abscond"	4:35
4.	"Human Bog"	4:23
5.	"Adam Copies"	4:02
6.	"Lev"	2:13
7.	"I Form"	4:16
8.	"Out"	3:56
9.	"Superstructure"	4:03
10.	"Wilt"	3:41
11.	"Coitus"	3:32
12.	"Broadback"	3:36

== Personnel ==
Credits adapted from AllMusic website.

Musicians

- Will Wiesesfield – performer, composer
- Emily Call – violin
- Alfred Dalrington – bass clarinet
- Madeline Falcone – violin
- Isaura String Quartet – strings
- Betsy Rettig – cello
- Melinda Rice – viola
- Derek Stein – cello
- John Wiesenfeld – guitar
- Adam Wolf – French horn

Technical personnel

- Daddy Kev – mastering
- Morgan Greenwood – additional production
- Mario Luna – engineering

Artwork

- Will Wiesesfield – cover photography
- Mario Luna – cover photography
- Cory Schmitz – design, layout, text
