= Ardour (album) =

Studio album by Teebs
- Released: October 19, 2010
- Genre: Instrumental hip-hop
- Length: 52:03
- Label: Brainfeeder
- Producer: Teebs

Teebs chronology
Ardour (2010)	Estara (2014)

Ardour is the debut studio album by Teebs. It was released on Brainfeeder on October 19, 2010.

== Production ==
When Teebs created the songs for the album, his father got ill. The two spent more time together and understood each other. Teebs made his father listen to his music for the first time. After the death of his father, he took a break from creating music for about four or five months. He then randomly bought some instruments such as a little flute and wind chimes and created a song called "Burner". It took two years for him to create the album.

== Critical reception ==
Professional ratings
Review scores
Source	Rating
Dusted Magazine	favorable
The Line of Best Fit	favorable
Pitchfork	8.0/10
Potholes in My Blog	4/5 stars
The Quietus	favorable
Resident Advisor	3.5/5 stars
The Skinny	3/5 stars
XLR8R	8.5/10

Rory Gibb of The Quietus commented that "Ardour is a lush, sumptuous record, openly heartfelt and immediately welcoming, though deceptively complex beneath its gauzy surface." Nate Patrin of Pitchfork gave the album an 8.0 out of 10, writing, "It's wispy and gentle and a bit cheerful on the surface, but giving it a deep listen will bring forth some of the more complex and abrasive elements to the forefront."

Kristina Benson of LA Weekly called it "one of the most delicate and lovely albums of the year". Jeff Weiss of Los Angeles Times wrote, "it's one of the most anticipated records within the Los Angeles beat community".

== Track listing ==
No.	Title	Length
1.	"You've Changed"	2:14
2.	"Bound Ball"	2:09
3.	"Double Fifths"	2:14
4.	"While You Doooo"	1:33
5.	"Moments"	2:35
6.	"Burner"	3:14
7.	"Wind Loop"	3:16
8.	"Lakeshore Ave."	1:47
9.	"Arthur's Birds"	5:19
10.	"Gordon"	3:29
11.	"Bern Rhythm"	2:37
12.	"Felt Tip"	3:02
13.	"King Bathtub"	2:57
14.	"My Whole Life"	3:13
15.	"Long Distance"	2:55
16.	"Why Like This"	2:59
17.	"Humming Birds"	4:40
18.	"Autumn Antique"	1:58
