= Under the Lilac Sky =

Studio album by Arushi Jain
- Released: July 9, 2021
- Genres: Hindustani classical; electronic; modular synthesizer

Arushi Jain chronology
With & Without (2019)	Under the Lilac Sky (2021)	Delight (2024)

Under the Lilac Sky is the second studio album by Indian composer Arushi Jain. It was released on July 9, 2021, via Leaving Records.

== Background ==
Arushi Jain is an Indian composer who grew up in New Delhi and lived there for 18 years. She began singing with her family at age eight and began vocal training. She studied at the Center for Computer Research in Music at Stanford University. She was based in Brooklyn as of 2021. Jain finished writing Under the Lilac Sky during COVID-19 lockdowns in 2020. Most of the pieces were composed for a performance at Alsisar Mahal in Rajasthan.

== Music ==
Under the Lilac Sky blends Hindustani classical music ragas with modular synthesizers. As well, elements of drone and new age are used. Each of the six tracks represents a specific time in the transition from day to night.

== Critical reception ==
Professional ratings
Review scores
Source	Rating
Ammar Kalia (The Guardian)	4/5 stars
Andrew Male (Mojo)	4/5 stars
Bhanuj Kappal (Pitchfork)	7.6 / 10
Jon Dale (Uncut)	8 / 10

Under the Lilac Sky received positive reviews from The Guardian, Mojo, Uncut, and Pitchfork writers.
