= Cerulean (Baths album) =

Studio album by Baths
- Released: June 22, 2010
- Genres: Hypnagogic pop; glitch; experimental pop; wonky
- Length: 43:24
- Label: Anticon
- Producer: Baths

Baths chronology
Cerulean (2010)	Pop Music/False B-Sides (2011)

Cerulean is the debut studio album by American electronic musician Baths. It was released on June 22, 2010, by Anticon.

== Critical reception ==
Professional ratings
Aggregate scores
Source	Rating
AnyDecentMusic?	7.5/10
Review scores
Source	Rating
AllMusic	4/5 stars
The A.V. Club	A−
BBC Music	(favorable)
Drowned in Sound	8/10
Exclaim!	(favorable)
Pitchfork	8.2/10
PopMatters	7/10 stars
Resident Advisor	4/5
The Skinny	4/5 stars
Spin	6/10

The album received generally favorable reviews from critics. The lead single "Maximalist" was premiered by Earmilk and later featured on Pitchfork. Later in 2010, Pitchfork gave Cerulean an "Honorable Mention" in their countdown of the best albums of 2010. The album was also named by The A.V. Club as the 21st best album of 2010.

== Track listing ==
No.	Title	Length
1.	"Apologetic Shoulder Blades"	2:29
2.	"Lovely Bloodflow"	3:35
3.	"Maximalist"	3:19
4.	"♥"	3:17
5.	"Aminals"	3:18
6.	"Rafting Starlit Everglades"	3:52
7.	"Hall"	3:31
8.	"You're My Excuse to Travel"	3:34
9.	"Rain Smell"	4:23
10.	"Indoorsy"	2:44
11.	"Plea"	4:15
12.	"Departure"	4:48
13.	"Thaumas" (bonus track)	5:17

== Personnel ==
Credits adapted from AllMusic website.

Musicians

- Will Wiesenfield – performer
- Mario Luna – guitar, vocals (track 7)

Technical personnel

- Daddy Kev – mastering

Artwork

- Jesselisa Moretti – artwork, design
