= DJ Paypal =

- Born: North Carolina, United States
- Genre: Footwork
- Occupations: Record producer, DJ
- Years active: 2012–present
- Labels: Sewage Tapes, Interscape Records Ltd., Mall Music Inc., LuckyMe, Brainfeeder

DJ Paypal is a footwork producer. Born in North Carolina, they reside in Berlin and are a member of the Teklife crew. They have often performed live with their face hidden to remain anonymous. Their 2015 debut album, Sold Out, was released on Brainfeeder to generally favorable reviews.

== Discography ==
Studio albums

- Sold Out (2015)
- 174.2.2 (2018)

EPs

- Why (2012)
- Drake Edits (2014)
- Buy Now (2015)

Singles

- "IRL" (2013)
- "Dose" (2016)
- "F.U.I.T.H" (2020)
