= Taylor McFerrin =

American singer-songwriter

- Born: Taylor McFerrin; June 28, 1981 (age 45); San Francisco, California
- Origin: Brooklyn, New York City
- Genres: Beatbox; future soul
- Occupations: Singer-songwriter; record producer; beatboxer; multi-instrumentalist
- Years active: 2006–present
- Label: Brainfeeder
- Website: http://www.taylormcferrin.com/

Taylor McFerrin (born June 28, 1981, in San Francisco, California) is an American DJ, music producer, keyboardist & beatboxer based in Brooklyn, New York City, United States. He is the eldest son of popular vocalist and classical conductor Bobby McFerrin.

McFerrin released his debut album Early Riser (2014) on Flying Lotus' Brainfeeder Records. The album features guest appearances from Nai Palm (Hiatus Kaiyote), Thundercat, Robert Glasper, Cesar Mariano, Marcus Gilmore and Bobby McFerrin.

Taylor's latest musical venture sees him as part of Robert Glasper's new jazz fusion supergroup, "R+R=Now", alongside Christian Scott, Terrace Martin, Derrick Hodge and Justin Tyson. The group released an album, Collagically Speaking via Blue Note Records in June 2018.

== Discography ==
=== Albums ===
- 2014: Early Riser
- 2019: Love's Last Chance

=== EPs ===
- 2006: Broken Vibes

=== Singles ===
- 2011: "Place in My Heart"
- 2020: "Chance to Say My Piece" (feat. Marcus Gilmore)
- 2022: "TELE PHOTO" / "ORIGINAL SUN"

=== Other appearances ===
Title	Year	Other artists	Album	
"Jubilee"	1982	Bobby McFerrin	Bobby McFerrin	Backing Vocal
"Taylor Made"	2002	Bobby McFerrin	Beyond Words	Beatbox
"If I Don't" (Taylor McFerrin Remix)	2006	Amp Fiddler, Corinne Bailey Rae	—N/a	Remixer
"What You Want (Taylormade)"	2006	Ty, Jason the Angrynotes, Joy Jones	Closer	Beatbox, producer
"Go With Love"	2007	RAHJ, Brockett Parsons	Brownswood Bubblers Two	Beatbox
"Nightwalker"	2008	TK Wonder	—N/a	Producer
"Love Conversation"	2010	José James	Blackmagic	Co-writer, producer
"Interlude"	2011	Dego	A Wha' Him Deh Pon?	Keyboards
"Come To My Door" (Taylor McFerrin Remix)	2013	José James	Come to mMy Door	Remixer
"Laputa ft. Anderson.Paak" (Taylor McFerrin Remix)	2016	Hiatus Kaiyote	Laputa ft. Anderson.Paak	Remixer
"Collagically Speaking"	2018	R+R=Now	"Collagically Speaking"	Composer, producer, Synthesizer
