= Celestial Recordings =

Record label

Celestial Recordings is a record label founded in 2010 by Steve Kelley. The label specialises in Electronic Music, focusing mainly in Deep and Tech House.

== See also ==
- List of record labels
