= Matthewdavid =

American record producer

- Born: Matthew David McQueen; May 20, 1984 (age 42); Atlanta, Georgia, U.S.
- Origin: Los Angeles, California, U.S.
- Genres: Electronic; new age
- Occupations: Record producer; DJ
- Years active: 2008–present
- Labels: Leaving Records; Brainfeeder; Plug Research

Matthew David McQueen (born May 20, 1984), better known by his stage name Matthewdavid, is an American record producer and DJ based in Los Angeles, California. He is a co-founder of Leaving Records. He has collaborated with Sun Araw, Dog Bite, and Serengeti.

== Early life ==
Matthewdavid was born in Atlanta, Georgia. As a child, he took guitar lessons and piano lessons. At the age of 14, he moved to Gulf Breeze, Florida with his family. At the age of 15, he started making music. He attended Florida State University. In 2006, he moved to Los Angeles, California. He interned at Plug Research and Dublab.

== Career ==
In 2008, Matthewdavid and Jesse Moretti co-founded Leaving Records. His debut studio album, Outmind, was released on Brainfeeder in 2011. The follow-up studio album, In My World, was released on Brainfeeder in 2014. Under the moniker Matthewdavid's Mindflight, he released Trust the Guide and Glide in 2016, and Ophiuchus in 2017.

== Discography ==
=== Studio albums ===
- Outmind (2011)
- In My World (2014)
- Trust the Guide and Glide (2016) (as Matthewdavid's Mindflight)
- Ophiuchus (2017) (as Matthewdavid's Mindflight)

=== Compilation albums ===
- Disk Collection (2009)
- Disk II (2012)
- Time Flying Beats (2018)

=== Live albums ===
- Livephreaxxx!!! (2011) (with Sun Araw)
- A Meditation on Events in 2016 (2016)

=== EPs ===
- Spills (2008)
- Los Angeles 2/10 (2010) (split with Sweatson Klank)
- Davis (2011) (with Serengeti)
- Swedish Fish (2011) (split with Odd Nosdam)
- International (2011)
- Culture Mystery (2012)
- Jewelry (2012)
- Destin (2012)
- Producers in 2012 Learn to Spread Love (2012)
- Mindflight (2013)
- Spore Drive (2019) (split with Seiho)
