= Quah =

Quah may refer to:

- Tahlequah, Oklahoma, a city in Oklahoma
- Issaquah, Washington, a city in Washington state
- Quah (album), an album by Jorma Kaukonen
- a Hokkien-language romanization of the Chinese surname Ke (surname), common in Southeast Asia
