= Clue to Kalo =

Australian folktronica band

- Origin: Adelaide, South Australia
- Genres: Folktronica, Ambient
- Years active: 1999–present
- Label: Mush Records
- Members: Mark Mitchell; Ellen Carey
- Website: Clue to Kalo on MySpace

Clue to Kalo is a Folktronica band from Adelaide, South Australia, featuring Mark Mitchell and a revolving cast of supporting musicians. Clue To Kalo’s initial commercial success came in the US through LA-based Mush Records. They were featured in Spin as Artist of the Day in September 2005. Lily Perdida, released 20 January 2009, has received critical favor.

== History ==
Adelaide's Clue to Kalo began as Mark Mitchell's solo recording project, piecing together samples and electronic instruments into "multilayered... homemade puzzle pop". As the band developed into a full line-up, Mark continued to record the base tracks on his computer, allowing the other members to layer their contributions on top. Their 2005 release, One Way, It's Every Way, earned them a spot in that year's South by Southwest festival. Clue to Kalo completed recording Lily Perdida in 2007, with Ellen Carey as a full-time member.

Mark has suspended his pursuit of a PhD in English Cultural Studies at a South Australian University to support the band full-time.

== Discography ==
=== Albums ===
- 2003: Come Here When You Sleepwalk
- 2005: One Way, It's Every Way
- 2009: Lily Perdida

=== EPs ===
- 2006: Man Who Took a Step Expecting a Stair But Instead Got Level Ground - Tour CD/Limited Edition 12" Picture Disc

== Videography ==
=== Videos ===
- 2005: "The Just is Enough"
