= Depth Affect =

Depth Affect was a French music group, active from 2004 to 2012. Their style was influenced by hip-hop, electronica, and pop.

Originally a duo of David Bideau and Rémy Charrier, from Nantes, France, in 2004 they opened for Alias. The duo added DJ Kalmook (Frédéric Puren) et the VJ DeesK (Xavier Brunet) and produced Arche Lymb in 2006, with the Autres Directions in Music label. The album was well-received critically. Afterwards the group performed at festivals and concerts in France along with rinôçérôse, Why?, dEUS, Coldcut, and Franz Ferdinand.

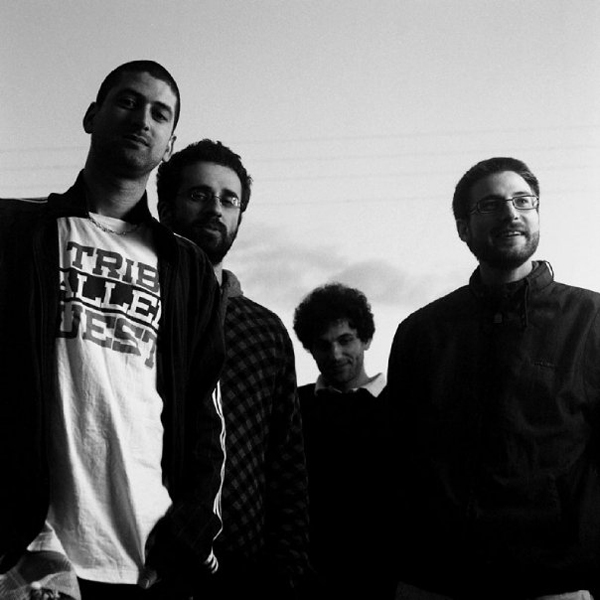
Depth Affect

In 2008 the group released Hero Crisis which was considered more accessible, consistent and catchy than the first album.

In 2010 the group made the EP Chorea. Songs from the EP can be downloaded free from SoundCloud.

In 2010 and 2011 the group toured Belgium, England and Russia).

In 2011 the album Draft Battle was released.

Depth Affect disbanded in August 2012.
