= Circus (rapper) =

American rapper

- Born: Marcus Aureli
- Origin: Los Angeles, California
- Genre: Alternative hip-hop
- Occupation: Rapper
- Years active: 1998-present
- Label: Mush Records
- Member of: Shape Shifters

Marcus Aureli, better known by his stage name Circus, is an American rapper based in Los Angeles, California. He is a member of Shape Shifters.

== Career ==
Circus released Gawd Bless the Faceless Cowards, a collaborative album with producer Andre Afram Asmar, on Mush Records in 2004. AllMusic gave the album 3 out of 5 stars, while Exclaim! described it as "a good album that might be Circus's most accessible release to date".

== Discography ==
=== Albums ===
- Gangstahz fo Gawd (2002)
- Bootlegs (2003)
- Gawd Bless the Faceless Cowards (2004) with Andre Afram Asmar

=== Guest appearances ===
- Omid - "Farmers Market of the Beast" from Beneath the Surface (1998)
- Three Eyed Cowz - "Broken Chain Shifters" from The Evil Cow Burger (1998)
- The Mind Clouders - "Unraveling" from Fake It Until You Make It (1999)
- Greenthink - "Circus Sells Lojak Doortadoor" from Blindfold (1999)
- 2Mex - Words Knot Music (2000)
- Daddy Kev - "This Stuff's Really Wacko" from Lost Angels (2001)
- Busdriver & Radioinactive with Daedelus - "Barely Music" from The Weather (2003)

=== Compilation appearances ===
- "Holy Shit!" from Music for the Advancement of Hip Hop (2000)
