= Ross from Friends =

British electronic music producer and DJ (born 1993)

- Also known as: Bubble Love
- Born: Felix Clary Weatherall; June 1993 (age 32); Colchester, Essex, England
- Genres: Electronic music, dub techno, vaporwave, house
- Occupation(s): DJ, record producer
- Years active: 2012–present
- Labels: Brainfeeder
- Website: rossfromfriends.net

Felix Clary Weatherall (born June 1993), known by his stage name Ross from Friends, is a British electronic music producer and DJ. He is signed to the Brainfeeder label, and released his debut album Family Portrait in July 2018, being noted as "one to watch" by The Guardian.

Weatherall began to make music under a number of different names before settling on Ross from Friends in 2012. The name was chosen because a TV in the studio he was using had a DVD of Friends stuck inside it, and so would only play episodes of Friends.

== Career ==
Weatherall's first releases came on small UK electronic labels, such as Magicwire and Lobster Theremin. His 2015 release "(Talk to Me) You'll Understand" was described by XLR8R as "a hazy lo-fi number with woozy synths and classy vocal samples." This breakthrough track has around nineteen million streams on YouTube.

Mixmag published a joke article on 1 April 2018, suggesting that David Schwimmer, who played Ross in the TV sitcom Friends, was suing Weatherall.

His debut album Family Portrait was released in July 2018. Mixmag described it as combining various electronic influences like "the vibrancy of hip hop, Japanese boogie, and house music". Weatherall rejects the use of the term 'lo-fi' for his music "because of the connotations of it."

In August 2019, Weatherall released Epiphany on Brainfeeder, a three track EP with artwork designed by the skateboarder Chad Muska.

Since 2024, Weatherall has also produced, released and performed under a separate alias, Bubble Love. His self-titled debut album under this alias was released on 6 December 2024 via his own record label, Scarlet Tiger.

== Live show ==
Weatherall tours his live show with his band members and friends, Jed Hampson and John Dunk. The live set has a unique setup "combining saxophone and keys with Ableton-led beats and basslines". The three bandmates have taken their live show to festivals and venues such as Glastonbury, Coachella, The Roundhouse and Sonar.

== Personal life ==
Weatherall was born and grew up in Brightlingsea, near Colchester, Essex, in a musical family. His father was a designer of electronic sound systems for live shows, and played "Hi-NRG and nascent techno music at squat parties".

Weatherall's first music video "Pale Blue Dot" is composed of archival homemade footage taken by his mother, telling the story of the spontaneous raves his parents set up with his father's homemade soundsystem on a bus around Europe in 1990.

== Discography ==
=== As Ross from Friends ===
==== Studio albums ====
- Family Portrait (July 2018, Brainfeeder)
- Tread (October 2021, Brainfeeder)

==== Extended plays ====
- David Crane's Amazing Tennis (2013)
- Alex Brown (2015)
- You'll Understand (2015)
- Don't Sleep, There Are Snakes (2017)
- The Outsiders (2017)
- Aphelion (2018)
- Epiphany (2019)

==== Remixes ====
- "Wallflower (Ross from Friends Remix)" (2015)
- "Halfway to Nowhere (Ross from Friends Remix)" (2017)
- "Edison (Ross from Friends Remix)" (2018)
- Thundercat — "Friend Zone (Ross from Friends Remix)" (2018)
- Flume (featuring London Grammar) — "Let You Know (Ross from Friends Remix)" (2019)

=== As Bubble Love ===
==== Studio albums ====
- Bubble Love (December 2024, Scarlet Tiger)

==== Singles ====
- Lying In The Sand (April 2025, Scarlet Tiger)

==== Remixes ====
- Ross From Friends — "Love Divide (Bubble Love Remix)"
- Ross From Friends — "The Knife (Bubble Love Remix)"
