= Martyn (musician) =

- Born: Martijn Deijkers; 1975 (age 50–51); Geldrop, Netherlands
- Genres: Dubstep, drum and bass, house, techno
- Occupations: Producer, DJ
- Years active: 2005–present
- Labels: 3024, Brainfeeder, Revolve:r, Ostgut Ton
- Website: 3024world.com

Martijn Deijkers (sometimes spelled Deykers), known professionally as Martyn, is a Dutch producer and DJ from Eindhoven, currently based in Washington D.C. in the United States. He is the son of Dutch former footballer Gerrie Deijkers. He started his career by DJing drum and bass in 1996, but began to include more of a dubstep influence after first hearing Kode9's "Sine of the Dub". He released his first 12" singles in 2005, incorporating elements of both techno and jungle. Deijkers' first album, Great Lengths, was released in 2009. In 2010 he released Fabric 50, the 50th installment of the Fabric Mix DJ series. Martyn's second studio album, Ghost People, was released in 2011 on the American label Brainfeeder.

== Discography ==
=== Studio albums ===
- Great Lengths (2009)
- Ghost People (2011)
- The Air Between Words (2014)
- Voids (2018)
- Music for Existing (2026)

=== Compilation albums ===
- Fabric 50 (2010)

=== EPs ===
- Newspeak (2013)
- Block The Box (2015)

=== Singles ===
- "Get Down" b/w "Black Lies" (2005)
- "Nxt 2 U" b/w "Deepwood" (2005)
- "Cloud Convention" b/w "Believe It" (2006)
- "I Wonder Why" b/w "Share My Wings" (2006)
- "Velvet" b/w "Twenty Four" (2007)
- "Broken" (2007)
- "Natural Selection" b/w "Vancouver" (2008)
- "Left Hander" b/w "Shook Up" (2010)
- "Masks" b/w "Viper" (2011)
- "Hello Darkness" (2012)
