= The Shape Shifters =

American hip-hop group

- Origin: Los Angeles, California, U.S.
- Genre: Alternative hip-hop
- Years active: 1998–present
- Labels: Champion Sound; Celestial Recordings; Mean Street; Cornerstone R.A.S.
- Members: Akuma; Awol One; Circus; Die Young; Existereo; LA Jae; Life Rexall; Perk One; Radioinactive
- Past members: DJ Rob One; Item; Meck(Gary Gnu); Relm; Ser; Shumagorath; Transducer/>Bleek

The Shape Shifters are an underground hip-hop collective based in Los Angeles, California. It consists of Akuma, Awol One, Circus, Die Young, Existereo, LA Jae, Life Rexall, Perk One, and Radioinactive.

The group prevented the Shapeshifters, another act from the United Kingdom, from using the name in the United States. That resulted in the latter changing its name to Shape:UK, but for the United States only.

== Discography ==
=== Albums ===
- Planet of the Shapes (1998)
- Know Future (1999)
- Adopted by Aliens (2000)
- Soul-Lows (2002)
- Soulows Two (2004)
- The Shape Shifters Was Here (2004)

=== Singles ===
- "Triple Threat" (1998)
- "2012" (1999)
- "Circuit City" (2004)
