= Baths (musician) =

American electronic musician (born 1989)

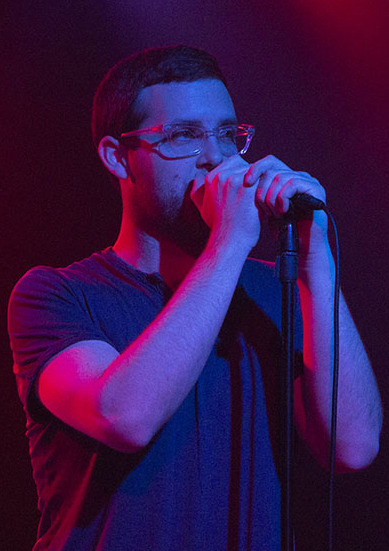
- Baths in concert, April 27, 2014

Background information
- Also known as: Geotic; [Post-Foetus]
- Born: William Boris Wiesenfeld; April 16, 1989 (age 37); Tarzana, Los Angeles, California, United States
- Origin: Culver City, Los Angeles, California, United States
- Genres: Electronic; electronica; electropop; glitch-pop
- Occupations: Singer; producer
- Years active: 2007–present
- Labels: Anticon; Basement's Basement; Ghostly
- Website: bathsmusic.net

William Boris Wiesenfeld (born April 16, 1989), better known by his stage name Baths, is an American electronic musician. He was born in the Tarzana neighborhood of Los Angeles and was raised in Woodland Hills, Los Angeles. He currently resides in Culver City, Los Angeles, California. Southern California Public Radio described him as "LA's big new electronica musician" in 2010. Previously signed with Anticon, he now releases music through his own label Basement's Basement.

== History ==
Will Wiesenfeld is a classically trained musician, and began learning the piano at the age of four "to compete with his brother". By twelve he had "completely abandoned it," but continual musical experimenting led him to record his first piece of music at age fourteen. He released a few projects, including an album entitled The Fabric, as his previous moniker, [Post-foetus]. He also ventured into a more ambient style with side-project Geotic, which Irish magazine State.ie called "gorgeous".

Will Wiesenfeld derives his current alias from his childhood memory of taking in art and music by dwelling on it in his bathtub, which he claims he was very fond of. Baths released the debut album Cerulean under Anticon in 2010. He recorded the entire album in two months from his bedroom. It was listed by The A.V. Club as the 21st best album of 2010. It also made Pitchfork's "Album of the Year: Honorable Mention" list.

His second album, Obsidian, was released in May 2013.

On March 6, 2014, during a concert in Hong Kong, Wiesenfeld unveiled one of his latest tracks from his EP "Ocean Death", released on May 6, 2014.

On November 16, 2017, Baths released his third album, Romaplasm.

On May 29, 2020, Baths released his fourth album Pop Music/ False B-Sides II on his own label, Basement's Basement. The album was supported by the singles "Wistful (Fata Morgana)" and "Mikaela Corridor".

On December 11, 2024, Baths released a new single, "Sea of Men", and announced a 2025 release date for his forthcoming full-length album Gut.

== Style ==
The BBC's Mike Diver claims Baths' nearest musical soundalike is chillwave musician Toro y Moi. Drowned in Sound noted Baths' use of "unorthodox" sounds layered in and around the electronics, in particular "clicking pens, vocal samples, rustling blankets and scissor snaps". British newspaper The Guardian's Paul Lester commented he was reminded of "J Dilla playing around with the Pavement and Prince catalogues" while listening to Cerulean.

In a 2017 interview with Ethan Gach from Kotaku, Baths said that he drew some inspiration from anime and video games such as The Elder Scrolls V: Skyrim and Dragon Age: Inquisition.

== Discography ==
=== As Baths ===
==== Studio albums ====
Title	Details
Cerulean	Released: July 6, 2010; Label: Anticon
Obsidian	Released: May 28, 2013; Label: Anticon
Romaplasm	Released: November 17, 2017; Label: Anticon
Gut	Released: February 21, 2025; Label: Basement's Basement

==== Compilations ====
Title	Details
Pop Music/False B-Sides	Released: May 31, 2011; Label: Anticon
Pop Music/False B-Sides II	Released: May 29, 2020; Label: Basement's Basement

==== Singles and EPs ====
- The Nothing (2011)
- Ocean Death (2014)
- "Yeoman" (2017)
- "Out" (2017)
- "Extrasolar" (2017)
- "Clarence Difference" (2019)
- "Wistful (Fata Morgana)" (2019)
- "Mikaela Corridor" (2020)
- "Be That" (2020)
- "Slut Hymn" (2023)
- "Projecting A Life" (2023)
- "Do I Make the World Worse" (2023)
- "Sea of Men" (2024)
- "Eden" (2025)
- 3 Negative Pop(?) Songs (2026)

==== Music videos ====
- "Lovely Bloodflow" (2010)
- "Out" (2017)
- "Mikaela Corridor" (2020)
- "Projecting A Life" (2023)
- "Sea of Men" (2024)
- "Eden" (2025)

=== As Geotic ===
==== Full length releases ====
- Eyes (2008)
- Duchenne Smile (2009)
- Hearth (2009)
- Realms (2010)
- Mend (2010)
- Morning Shore (Eon Isle) (2014)
- Sunset Mountain (Eon Isle) (2014)
- Neptune (2015)
- Abysma (2017)
- Traversa (2018)
- Oxperls (2020)
- To Not Now, Nor To Ever, Despair (2022)
- Oversight (2023)
- The Anchorite (2024)

==== Compilations ====
- Various / Singles (2014)

==== Singles and EPs ====
- Winter Loops (2008)
- Bless The Self (2011)
- "Troperens" (2019)

==== Music videos ====
- "Actually Smiling" (2017)
- "Nav" (2017)
- "Gondolier" (2018)
- "Knapsack" (2019)

=== As [Post-foetus] ===
- The 1st Will Wiesenfeld EP (2007)
- The Fabric (2010)
- Zero Songs EP (2007 - 2012) (2020)

=== Guest appearances ===
- Daedelus – "French Cuffs" from Bespoke (2011)
- Dntel – "Still" from Aimlessness (2012)
- Groundislava – "Suicide Mission" from Feel Me (2012)
- Cokiyu – "Twinkle Way" from Haku (2013)
- Nobody – "Beaches" from Vivid Green (2013)
- Ryan Hemsworth – "Still Cold" from Guilt Trips (2013)
- Flying Lotus – "Little Hours" from Ideas + Drafts + Loops (2013)
- Ryan York – "The Other Side of Backwater" from Zipperlegs (2015)
- D33J – "Wisp" from Death Valley Oasis (2017)
- Lala Lala – "€ € € €^^%%!!!!!heaven!!!!!!" (2020)
- Loraine James – "On The Lake Outside" from Reflection (2021)
- Hrishikesh Hirway – "Seams" from Rooms I Used To Call My Own (2022)
- Bambina – "Boys Who Run" (2023)
- Lillie West – "LUNGA" from if i were a real man i would be able to break the neck of a suffering bird (2025)
- Akira Kosemura – "The Walking Man" from MIRAI (2025)
- Colin Self – "The Thief's Journal" from respite ∞ levity for the nameless ghost in crisis (2026)

=== Remixes ===
- Oscar McClure – "Kitchen Scraps (Baths' Otalgia Mix)" (2010)
- Fol Chen – "In Ruins (Baths Remix)" (2010)
- Themselves – "Deadcatclear II (Baths Remix)" (2010)
- Shlohmo – "Post Atmosphere (Baths Remix)" (2010)
- Rafter – "Fruit (Baths Remix)" (2010)
- Gold Panda – "Marriage (Baths Remix)" (2011)
- Son Lux – "Rebuild (Baths Remix)" (2012)
- Lali Puna – "Move On (Baths Remix)" (2012)
- Dntel – "Jitters (Geotic Mix)" (2012)
- Grizzly Bear – "Will Calls (Baths Remix)" (2014)
- WHY? – "Easy (Baths Remix)" (2018)
- Tomas Barfod feat. Jonas Smith – "Family (Baths Remix)" (2018)
- Mikky Ekko –"What's It Like Now (Baths Remix)" (2018)
- Let's Eat Grandma – "I Will Be Waiting (Baths Remix)" (2018)
- Imogen Heap – "The Quiet (Re-imagined by Baths)" (2019)
- Themselves – "Deadcatclearii (Remix)" (2019)
- Dosh – "Summertime Time (Baths Remix)" (2020)
- Katie Dey – "Loving (Baths Remix)" (2021)
- ODESZA – "Today (Baths Rework)" (2022)
- PENDANT – "Static Dream (Baths Remix)" (2022)
- Optometry – "Wrong Things (Baths Remix)" (2024)
- Tom Vek – "The Lower The Sun (Baths Remix)" (2025)
- Disiniblud – "Disiniblud (Baths Remix)" (2025)

=== Soundtrack work ===
- Bee and PuppyCat (2013–2022) (credited as Will Wiesenfeld)
- Queer Japan (2019) (credited as Geotic)
- Big Boys (2023) (credited as Baths)
