= Slanguage (album) =

Studio album by Awol One and Daddy Kev
- Released: March 18, 2003
- Genre: Alternative hip-hop
- Length: 59:06
- Label: Mush Records
- Producer: Daddy Kev

Awol One and Daddy Kev chronology
Number 3 on the Phone (2002)	Slanguage (2003)

Professional ratings
Review scores
Source	Rating
AllMusic	3/5 stars
Brainwashed	favorable
Dusted Magazine	favorable
Exclaim!	favorable
Pitchfork	5.5/10
PopMatters	favorable
XLR8R	mixed

Slanguage is the third collaborative studio album by Awol One and Daddy Kev. It was released on Mush Records on March 18, 2003. It features contributions from D-Styles.

== Critical reception ==
Rob Theakston of AllMusic wrote, "it's probably the closest fusion of free improv jazz and hip-hop that's ever been committed to disc." He called it "a record that requires intense concentration and immediate attention in order for everything to make sense." Dave Heaton of PopMatters said, "Slanguage finds Awol One and Daddy Kev taking a schizophrenic approach to MCing and DJing, switching everything up constantly, while creating a continuous mood that makes the album feel more like one piece of music than a collection of songs."

== Track listing ==
No.	Title	Length
1.	"Ear Drums for Beer Runs at AA"	0:41
2.	"Start Your Road Trip Now"	1:23
3.	"My Father Is Time, My Mother Is Nature"	1:21
4.	"Six Black Roses Are Sent to Your House"	2:58
5.	"Audio Bibles Are Written on Stone Tablet Tables"	1:05
6.	"Finger Paint with Bloodlike War Paint"	2:31
7.	"That One Song That You Play When You're Faded"	2:10
8.	"Mechanical Angel in Purgatory"	1:47
9.	"Reflections for Scratching Your Face Off"	2:31
10.	"Grey Skys in Psycho-Delic RGB"	1:27
11.	"Idiot Savant Autistic Delivery"	5:34
12.	"Bootleg Monster Movies"	5:13
13.	"Montgomery Burns' Quest for Power"	3:22
14.	"Bladder Sweat A.K.A. Colon Soup Rockin' the Mic"	4:16
15.	"My Favorite Weapon Selection"	1:07
16.	"High School Love Story Drop Out Song"	4:42
17.	"Psychos vs. Suckers Are the Branch Davidians"	0:45
18.	"Buyin' Friends on Ebay"	3:41
19.	"Slowly Means God Is My Witness"	3:02
20.	"A Trainwreck in the Netherworlds"	3:37
21.	"The Rules of the Week"	5:03
22.	"Turn Your Lights Off Conspiracy"	0:50

== Personnel ==
- Awol One – vocals, keyboards
- Daddy Kev – production, arrangement, percussion
- D-Styles – turntables
