= CWA =

CWA or Cwa may refer to:

== Organisations ==
- CWA Constructions, a Swiss manufacturer of gondolas and people mover cabins, a division of Doppelmayr Garaventa Group
- Central Weather Administration, the weather agency of Taiwan
- Catch Wrestling Association, a former German/Austrian professional wrestling promotion
- Continental Wrestling Association, another professional wrestling promotion, based in Memphis, Tennessee
- Civil Works Administration, a New Deal era agency in the US
- College of West Anglia, a college in Norfolk, England
- Country Women's Association, Australian Rural Women's Group
- Crime Writers' Association, a British crime authors' organisation
- Concerned Women for America, a conservative Christian lobbying group in the US
- Cardroom Workers' Amalgamation, a defunct British trade union
- Communications Workers of America, a labor union

== Science and technology ==
- Closed-world assumption, formalisms of knowledge representation
- Cognitive work analysis, a framework for describing complex systems
- County Warning Area, a forecast region for which the US National Weather Service issues individual weather reports
- Cwa, in Köppen climate classification, is one of the humid subtropical climates with monsoonal influences
- Corona-Warn-App, a COVID-19 contact tracing mobile app
- Center Weather Advisory, weather advisory service in the United States for aviation

== Other uses ==
- Canada Wildlife Act
- Cwa people, non-Mbuti Pygmies of the Democratic Republic of the Congo
- Chessington World of Adventures, an amusement park in Surrey, England
- Central Wisconsin Airport (IATA code)
- Conference on World Affairs, at University of Colorado, Boulder, US
- CEN Workshop Agreement, a reference document from the European Committee for Standardization
- Clean Water Act, an environmental law in the US
- Choi Wan station (station code CWA), a planned station in Hong Kong's Metro system
- Community Workforce Agreement, a type of labor agreement
