= Never Catch Me =

Single by Flying Lotus featuring Kendrick Lamar

from the album You're Dead!
- Released: September 3, 2014
- Genre: Electronic; drum and bass; jazz rap; footwork; nu jazz; experimental; wonky
- Length: 3:31
- Label: Warp
- Songwriters: Steven Ellison; Kendrick Duckworth
- Producer: Ellison

Flying Lotus singles chronology
"Putty Boy Strut" (2012)	"Never Catch Me" (2014)

Kendrick Lamar singles chronology
"i" (2014)	"Never Catch Me" (2014)	"The Blacker the Berry" (2015)

Music video
- "Never Catch Me" on YouTube

"Never Catch Me" is a song by American music producer Flying Lotus from his fifth studio album You're Dead! (2014). The song features vocals from hip hop recording artist Kendrick Lamar. "Never Catch Me" received a nomination for Best Dance Recording at the 58th Grammy Awards.

== Composition ==
The song features "buoyantly" jazzy, occasionally Zappa-esque production. Kendrick Lamar raps over warp-speed psychedelic soul-jazz beat. According to music critics, the track shows influences from jazz-tinged drum and bass artist Roni Size, the "gleeful" mania of OutKast’s "B.O.B", and early '90s jazz rap. The track's instrumental samples Eric McDaniels and TLC Cathedral Choirs ONE MORE CHANCE, notably the bassline provided by Reggie Young.

== Critical reception ==
Music critics favorably reviewed "Never Catch Me". Named Best New Track by Pitchfork Media, editor Jayson Greene praised Lamar's performance, writing "his hyper-vaulting flow and embedded rhyme patterns within rhyme patterns". For its year-end list of "The 100 Best Tracks of 2014", Pitchfork ranked the song at number 23. Also commenting on Lamar, Billboard's Chris Payne wrote, "There aren't many A-list rappers who could handle a beat like this, but Kendrick is clearly one of them." Rolling Stone editor Jon Dolan gave the song three-and-a-half out of five stars, commenting "Over offhandedly lovely, warp-speed psychedelic soul-jazz, Lamar unleashes a word-mad waterfall with a worried emotional core ("analyze my demise I say I'm super-anxious", he raps)." Consequence of Sound editor Nina Corcoran wrote: "when combined with one of Lamar’s hottest verses to date (before To Pimp a Butterfly), the song explodes. But it doesn’t stop there. FlyLo shows off his talent by shifting gears post-Kendrick verse the only way you can: insane keys, double-time bass drum, and unrelenting hand claps. Eventually, it’s all swallowed up in massive swelling synth and choral hums, fading to a beautiful, passionate outro."

== Music video ==
Directed by Hiro Murai, the video begins at a funeral (including attendees Flying Lotus and Thundercat in cameo roles). Seemingly a sad video, it turns instantly joyful when the two late children—a boy and a girl—bound out of their caskets at the front of the church and dance gleefully down the aisle. The mourners can't see the children as they dance right out of the church and out onto a blacktop, but a group of other kids chases after them as they hop in a hearse and drive away.

The clip was featured by several publications on their year-end list of best videos, including Pitchfork, Spin, and Stereogum—with the latter listing it at number one. The video received two nominations at the 2015 MTV Video Music Awards: Best Choreography and Best Cinematography, ultimately winning the latter.

== Charts ==
Chart (2014)	Peak position
Belgium (Ultratip Bubbling Under Flanders)	71
Japan Hot 100 (Billboard)	100
