= Antimc =

American hip hop producer (born 1978)

- Also known as: Anonymous
- Born: Matthew Alsberg; February 19, 1978 (age 48); Los Angeles, California
- Genres: Alternative hip hop
- Occupations: Producer, multi-instrumentalist
- Years active: 1999-present
- Label: Mush Records
- Website: antimc.bandcamp.com

Matthew Alsberg, better known by his stage name Antimc, is an American hip hop producer from Los Angeles, California.

== Career ==
Antimc released Free Kamal, a collaborative album with rapper Radioinactive, on Mush Records in 2004.

He released the album, It's Free, but It's Not Cheap on Mush Records in 2006. It featured guest appearances from Busdriver and Andrew Broder, among others.

== Discography ==
=== Albums ===
- Instrumentals at Work (1999)
- Old Leg (2001)
- Free Kamal (2004) with Radioinactive
- It's Free, but It's Not Cheap (2006)

=== EPs ===
- Run (2003)
- Bitter Breaks One (2003)

=== Productions ===
- Radioinactive - "Elevator Shoes" from Fo' Tractor (1999)
- Radioinactive - Pyramidi (2001)

=== Contributions ===
- Busdriver - "Handfuls of Sky" and "Scoliosis Jones" from Jhelli Beam (2009)
