= Teebs =

American musical artist (born 1987)

- Born: Mtendere Mandowa; April 10, 1987
- Origin: Los Angeles, California
- Genres: Hip-hop, instrumental hip-hop
- Occupation: Producer
- Years active: 2009-present
- Labels: Brainfeeder, Svetlana Industries, All City Records, My Hollow Drum
- Website: soundcloud.com/teebsio mtendereteebs.com

Mtendere Mandowa, better known by his stage name Teebs, is an American record producer and visual artist from Los Angeles, California. He is a member of the My Hollow Drum collective. He is also one half of the duo Sons of the Morning.

== Life and career ==
Born in The Bronx, Mandowa was raised by parents from Malawi and Barbados.

Teebs released his first album, Ardour, on Brainfeeder in 2010. LA Weekly called it "one of the most delicate and lovely albums of the year". It was followed by a compilation album, Collections 01, released on Brainfeeder in 2011.

In 2013, Sons of the Morning, his collaborative project with Prefuse 73, released the debut EP, Speak Soon Volume One, on Yellow Year Records. In 2014, Teebs released his second studio album, Estara, on Brainfeeder. In October 2019, Teebs released his third studio album, Anicca, also on Brainfeeder, with features from Panda Bear, Pink Siifu, Sudan Archives, and more.

In September 2022, Teebs released "Did It Again," a single featuring Panda Bear, along with the b-side "NES."

== Style and influences ==
Teebs' style has been referred to as "beat music", a style which involves recording, layering, altering and organizing several sounds including harps, shakers, drum taps and even tape peeling.

== Discography ==
=== Studio albums ===
- Ardour (2010)
- Estara (2014)
- Anicca (2019)

=== Compilation albums ===
- Collections 01 (2011)

=== EPs ===
- The Tropics EP (2010) (with Jackhigh)
- Los Angeles 6/10 (2010) (with Daedelus)
- Speak Soon Volume One (2013) (with Prefuse 73, as Sons of the Morning)

=== Singles ===
- "Why Like This?" (2010)
- "Did It Again" (2022) (with Panda Bear)

=== Productions ===
- Captain Murphy - "The Prisoner" from Duality (2012)

=== Remixes ===
- Populous with Short Stories - "Only Hope (Teebs Remix)" from Remixed in Basic (2010)
- Nosaj Thing - "Caves (Teebs Remix)" from Drift Remixed (2010)
- Exile - "So We Can Move (Teebs Remix)" from Radio Bonus (2010)
- Oscar McClure - "Teebs' Never Repeat It Mix" from Compost (2010)
- Flying Lotus - "Archway (Teebs Remix)" from Cosmogramma Alt Takes (2011)
- Shlohmo - "Wen Uuu (Teebs Remix)" from Vacation: Remixes (2012)
- Hundred Waters - "Boreal (Teebs Remix)" from Boreal Remix EP (2013)
- The Go! Team - "Get It Together (Teebs Remix)" from Thunder, Lightning, Strike Remixed (2025)
