= Andre Afram Asmar =

- Origin: Los Angeles, California
- Genre: Alternative hip-hop
- Occupation: Producer
- Years active: 2000-present
- Label: Mush Records

Andre Afram Asmar is an American hip-hop producer from Los Angeles, California.

== Career ==
Andre Afram Asmar released the solo album, Race to the Bottom, on Mush Records in 2003.

He released Gawd Bless the Faceless Cowards, a collaborative album with rapper Circus, on Mush Records in 2004.

== Discography ==
=== Albums ===
- The Living Zombeats (2000)
- Race to the Bottom (2003)
- Gawd Bless the Faceless Cowards (2004) with Circus
- Harmonic Emergency (2011)

=== EPs ===
- Asmar Beats Vol. 1 (1998)
- Transmigration (2003)
