= Radioinactive =

American rapper

- Born: Kamal Humphrey de Iruretagoyena
- Origin: Los Angeles, California
- Genre: Hip-hop
- Occupations: Rapper, producer
- Years active: 1998-present
- Labels: Mush Records, Stranger Touch Records, Flying Carpet Studios, Laitdbac Records

Kamal Humphrey de Iruretagoyena, better known by his stage name Radioinactive, is an American hip-hop artist from Los Angeles, California. He is a member of The Shape Shifters. He was a member of Log Cabin along with Eligh, Murs and Scarub. He has released a number of solo albums, as well as collaborating with artists such as Busdriver, Daedelus, and Antimc.

== Life and career ==
Radioinactive released the first solo album, Pyramidi, on Mush Records in 2001. The Weather, his collaborative album with rapper Busdriver and producer Daedelus, was released on the label in 2003.

In 2004, he released a collaborative album with producer Antimc, titled Free Kamal, on Mush Records. Josh Drimmer of Dusted Magazine said: "Intelligent and fun, it's a good record to listen to with a cool glass of lemonade. And a dictionary."

His second solo album, Soundtrack to a Book, was released on Stranger Touch Records in 2006. Mason Jones of Dusted Magazine described it as "an excellent mini-album, perhaps the best yet from Radioinactive." He released the third solo album, The Akashic Record, on Flying Carpet Studios in 2012.

== Discography ==
=== Albums ===
- Pyramidi (2001)
- The Weather (2003) (with Busdriver and Daedelus)
- Free Kamal (2004) (with Antimc)
- Soundtrack to a Book (2006)
- The Akashic Record (2012)

=== EPs ===
- The Music (1999)
- Fo' Tractor (2003)
- Hip-Hop Helmet (2014)

=== Singles ===
- "Touch Type" b/w "Winthorp & Winthorp" (2003) (with Busdriver)
- "Mint Tea" b/w "Bury Me Standing" (2012) (with 2Mex and La Caution)
- "Chump" (2013)
- "Natural Born Loser" (2016) (with Sheila Brody)

=== Guest appearances ===
- Omid - "Farmers Market of the Beast" from Beneath the Surface (1998)
- Neila - "Da Duh" from Starting Early (2000)
- Busdriver - "Somethingness" from Temporary Forever (2002)
- TTC - "Latest Dance Craze" from Batards Sensibles (2004)
- Awol One - "Gagbuster" from Self Titled (2004)
- Akuma and Factor Chandelier - "Dig Dig Dig" from Dawn of a New Era (2005)
- Poirier - "Propaganda" from Rebondir EP (2006)
- Phoenix Orion & Paranorml - "Ahead of Our Time" from Beyonders: Time Capsule (2006)
- Prosperous - "Limo Clorox" from Solar Residue (2006)
- M.Fusion - "One Life to Live" from The Goth Kid EP (2007)
- Existereo - "Shifter Track" from Excuse My French (2010)
- Blaq Tongue Society - "Third Eye of the Sun" from Blaq Tongue Society (2013)
