= Brainfeeder =

American independent record label

- Founded: 2008
- Founder: Flying Lotus
- Distributors: Alpha Pup Records (U.S.); Ninja Tune (Rest of World)
- Genre: Electronic; hip-hop; jazz; experimental
- Country of origin: United States
- Location: Los Angeles, California, U.S.
- Official website: www.brainfeedersite.com

Brainfeeder is an independent record label based in Los Angeles, California, founded by Flying Lotus in 2008, focusing on electronic music and instrumental hip-hop. It has signed artists such as Ras G, Samiyam, The Gaslamp Killer, Thundercat, The Underachievers, Lapalux, Daedelus, Genevieve Artadi, Hiatus Kaiyote, Kit Sebastian and Mr. Oizo.

== History ==
In 2007, Brainfeeder debuted as the name of a four-hour radio broadcast by Flying Lotus and his friends on Dublab. It is also the name of the first track on Flying Lotus's album Los Angeles. In 2008, Brainfeeder officially launched as a record label. In 2010, Ninja Tune offered Brainfeeder a deal to manufacture, distribute and promote the catalogue worldwide, with Alpha Pup Records remaining as the U.S. digital distributor. In that year, Brainfeeder was listed by LA Weekly as the most exciting Los Angeles indie label. In 2012, it was named "Label of the Year" at Gilles Peterson's Worldwide Awards.

== Roster ==
- Austin Peralta
- Captain Murphy
- Daedelus
- DJ Paypal
- Dorian Concept
- Flying Lotus (Note: While Flying Lotus founded Brainfeeder, he remains signed to Warp Records for his own major physical releases.)
- Genevieve Artadi
- George Clinton
- Georgia Anne Muldrow
- Hakushi Hasegawa
- Hiatus Kaiyote
- Iglooghost
- Jaga Jazzist
- Jameszoo
- Jeremiah Jae
- Kamasi Washington
- Kit Sebastian
- Lapalux
- Locust Toybox
- Lorn
- Louis Cole
- Martyn
- Matthewdavid
- Miguel Atwood-Ferguson
- Mono/Poly
- Mr. Oizo
- Ras G
- Ross from Friends
- Ryat
- Salami Rose Joe Louis
- Samiyam
- Taylor McFerrin
- Teebs
- Terence Etc.
- The Gaslamp Killer
- Thundercat
- Tokimonsta
- The Underachievers

== Brainfeeder Films ==
In July 2016, Flying Lotus announced that a new film division was in work, and Brainfeeder Films was founded as a film finance and production company with Eddie Alcazar that September.
