= Flying Lotus discography =

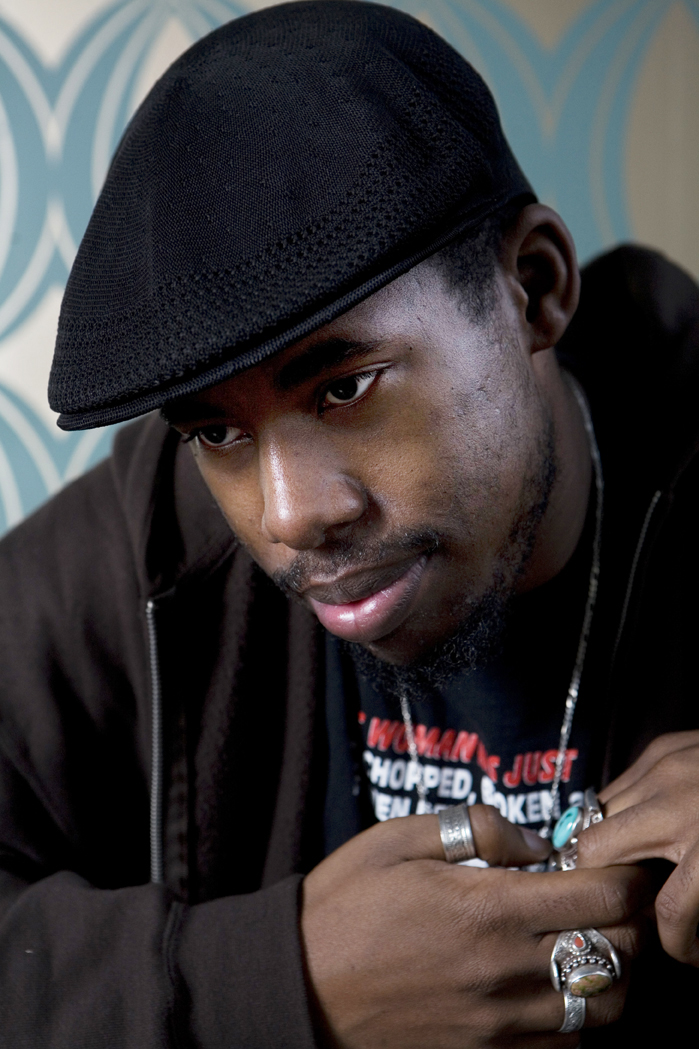
- Flying Lotus in May 2008
- Studio albums: 6
- Extended plays: 7
- Compilation albums: 1
- Mixtapes: 2

The discography of Flying Lotus, an experimental multi-genre music producer, laptop musician, and rapper from Los Angeles, California.

== Albums ==
=== Studio albums ===
| Title | Details | Peak positions | | | | | | | | | |
| Title | Details | US | US Dance | AUS | BEL | FRA | GER | JPN | NLD | SWI | UK |
|---|---|---|---|---|---|---|---|---|---|---|---|
| 1983 | Release date: October 3, 2006; Label: Plug Research; Formats: LP, CD, digital download | — | — | — | — | — | — | — | — | — | — |
| Los Angeles | Release date: June 10, 2008; Label: Warp; Formats: LP, CD, digital download | — | 16 | — | — | — | — | — | — | — | ― |
| Cosmogramma | Release date: April 20, 2010; Label: Warp; Formats: LP, CD, digital download | 88 | 3 | — | — | 159 | — | — | — | — | 60 |
| Until the Quiet Comes | Release date: October 1, 2012; Label: Warp; Formats: LP, CD, digital download | 34 | 2 | — | 26 | 160 | 83 | 41 | 72 | 99 | 34 |
| You're Dead! | Release date: October 7, 2014; Label: Warp; Format: LP, CD, digital download | 19 | 1 | 48 | 29 | 157 | 77 | — | 55 | 50 | 24 |
| Flamagra | Release date: May 24, 2019; Label: Warp; Format: LP, CD, digital download | 45 | 1 | 55 | 16 | ― | 20 | 28 | 60 | — | 25 |
"—" denotes a recording that did not chart or was not released in that territory.

=== Compilations ===
| Year | Compilation details |
|---|---|
| 2009 | LA CD: Released: 17 October 2009; Label: Beat Records (Japan); Formats: CD |

=== Soundtrack ===
| Year | Soundtrack details |
|---|---|
| 2018 | Perfect: Released: 11 March 2018; Label: Self-released; Formats: digital download |
| 2021 | Yasuke: Released: 30 April 2021; Label: Netflix, Warp; Formats: LP, CD, digital download |

=== Mixtapes ===
| Year | Mixtape details |
|---|---|
| 2012 | Duality (as Captain Murphy): Released: 28 November 2012; Label: Brainfeeder, Roam International (Limited physical release); Formats: digital download |

=== Demos ===
- 2005: July Heat

Note: Various unofficial Flying Lotus demos leaked by fans are sometimes mistaken as official Flying Lotus releases, such as "Raw Cartoons."

== Extended plays ==
| Year | EP details |
|---|---|
| 2007 | Reset: Released: 1 October 2007; Label: Warp; Formats: Vinyl, digital download |
| 2008 | L.A. EP 1 X 3: Released: 14 July 2008; Label: Warp; Formats: Vinyl, digital download |
| 2008 | Shhh!: Released: August 2008; Label: White Label; Formats: Vinyl, digital download |
| 2008 | L.A. EP 2 X 3: Released: 24 November 2008; Label: Warp; Formats: Vinyl, digital download |
| 2009 | L.A. EP 3 X 3: Released: 19 August 2009; Label: Warp; Formats: Vinyl, digital download |
| 2010 | Pattern+Grid World: Released: 20 September 2010; Label: Warp; Formats: Vinyl, digital download |
| 2011 | Cosmogramma Alt Takes: Released: 12 January 2011; Label: Warp; Formats: Vinyl, digital download |
| 2019 | Presents INFINITY "Infinitum" - Maida Vale Session TX: 19/08/10: Released: 15 November 2019; Label: Warp; Formats: Vinyl, digital download |
| 2023 | Flying Objects (with Smoke DZA): Released: 1 September 2023; Label: Smoker's Club; Formats: digital download |
| 2024 | Spirit Box: Released: October 29, 2024; Label: Warp; Formats: digital download |
| 2026 | Big Mama: Released: March 6, 2026; Label: Brainfeeder; Formats: digital download |

== Singles ==
=== Charted singles ===
| Title | Year | Peak chart positions | | | Album |
| Title | Year | BEL | JPN | US Dance | Album |
|---|---|---|---|---|---|
| "Never Catch Me" (featuring Kendrick Lamar) | 2014 | 121 | 100 | — | You're Dead! |
| "Spontaneous" (featuring Little Dragon) | 2019 | ― | — | 50 | Flamagra |
| "More" (featuring Anderson .Paak) | 2019 | ― | — | 30 | Flamagra |
| "Black Balloons Reprise" (featuring Denzel Curry) | 2019 | ― | ― | 41 | Flamagra |
"—" denotes a release that did not chart.

=== 12-inch singles ===
- 2006: Pink Sun EP (12", EP) My Room Is White (Flying Lotus Remix) - Plug Research
- 2008: Cool Out (12") Lost (Flying Lotus Remix) - Hyperdub
- 2008: Dive EP (12", EP) Blank Blue (Flying Lotus Remix) - Ubiquity Records
- 2008: Get Dirty EP (12", EP) Game Over (Flying Lotus Remix) - Ghostly International
- 2008: Natural Selection (Flying Lotus' Cleanse Mix) / Vancouver (2562's Puur Natuur Dub) (12")
- 2008: Woebegone (CD, Single, Promo) Woebegone (Flying Lotus Remix) - Ninja Tune
- 2009: Glendale Galleria (12", Single) - Tectonic

== Collaborations ==
- 2008: "One for Pep Pep (Remix)" (Tim and Eric's Awesome Record, Great Songs! Volume One)
- 2008: "Testament (w/ Gonjasufi)
- 2009: "Bootleg Beats" (w/ Samiyam)
- 2011: "Kryon" (w/ Kode9 & the Spaceape)
- 2011: "Group Tea" (w/ Matthewdavid)
- 2011: "Lost" (w/ King Midas Sound)
- 2012: "Lately" & "Lamented" (w/ Hodgy Beats)
- 2013: "Dog It" (w/ Jonwayne, Jeremiah Jae)
- 2013: "Between Villains" (w/ Earl Sweatshirt, Viktor Vaughn & Thundercat)

== Mixes ==
- 2008: Flying Lotus 'Brainfeeder Radio' Part 2
- 2009: The Black Fist
- 2011: Lover's Melt (Stones Throw Podcast)
- 2011: Lover's Melt Pt. 2 (Brainfeeder Podcast)
- 2012: Lover's Melt Pt. 3 (Brainfeeder Podcast)
- 2013: Lover's Melt Pt. 4 (Brainfeeder Podcast)
