= Big Mama (EP) =

2026 EP by Flying Lotus

EP by Flying Lotus
- Released: March 6, 2026
- Genre: Electronic
- Length: 13:21
- Label: Brainfeeder
- Producer: Flying Lotus

Flying Lotus chronology
| Spirit Box (2024) | Big Mama (2026) |

Big Mama is the eleventh extended play (EP) by American musician Flying Lotus. It was released through Flying Lotus' own record label, Brainfeeder, his first project to be released, on March 6, 2026. Following multiple projects including the sci-fi film Ash (2025), Flying Lotus returned to producing electronic music, with a desire to experiment using FM synthesis and spending two months producing 10–15 seconds of music per day for two months, evolving into the sonic abrasiveness of Big Mama.

Solely produced by Flying Lotus with mastering by American DJ Daddy Kev in New Zealand, the former visualized images of "getting shot out of a cannon", inspiring the EP's artwork (created by Christopher Ian Macfarlane). Inspired by the '90s cartoons The Simpsons and The Ren & Stimpy Show, Big Mama's design conceptualizes around the titular character, "a bomb with a big booty", who destroys a futuristic city. Big Mama's design was interfered several times on the size of her butt to make it a priority of the cover.

Released with an accompanying animated short film and no singles, Big Mama received mixed reviews from music critics, crediting its experimental approach while criticizing its production for its perceived setbacks of rushed ideas and its constantly conflicting tracks. Big Mama is also accompanied by an animated stop motion short film, released in blue-colored vinyl, and features an additional track that contains the whole EP but in a full unseparated mix. Big Mama charted on the UK Album Downloads and North American College and Community Radio (NACC) charts.

== Background ==
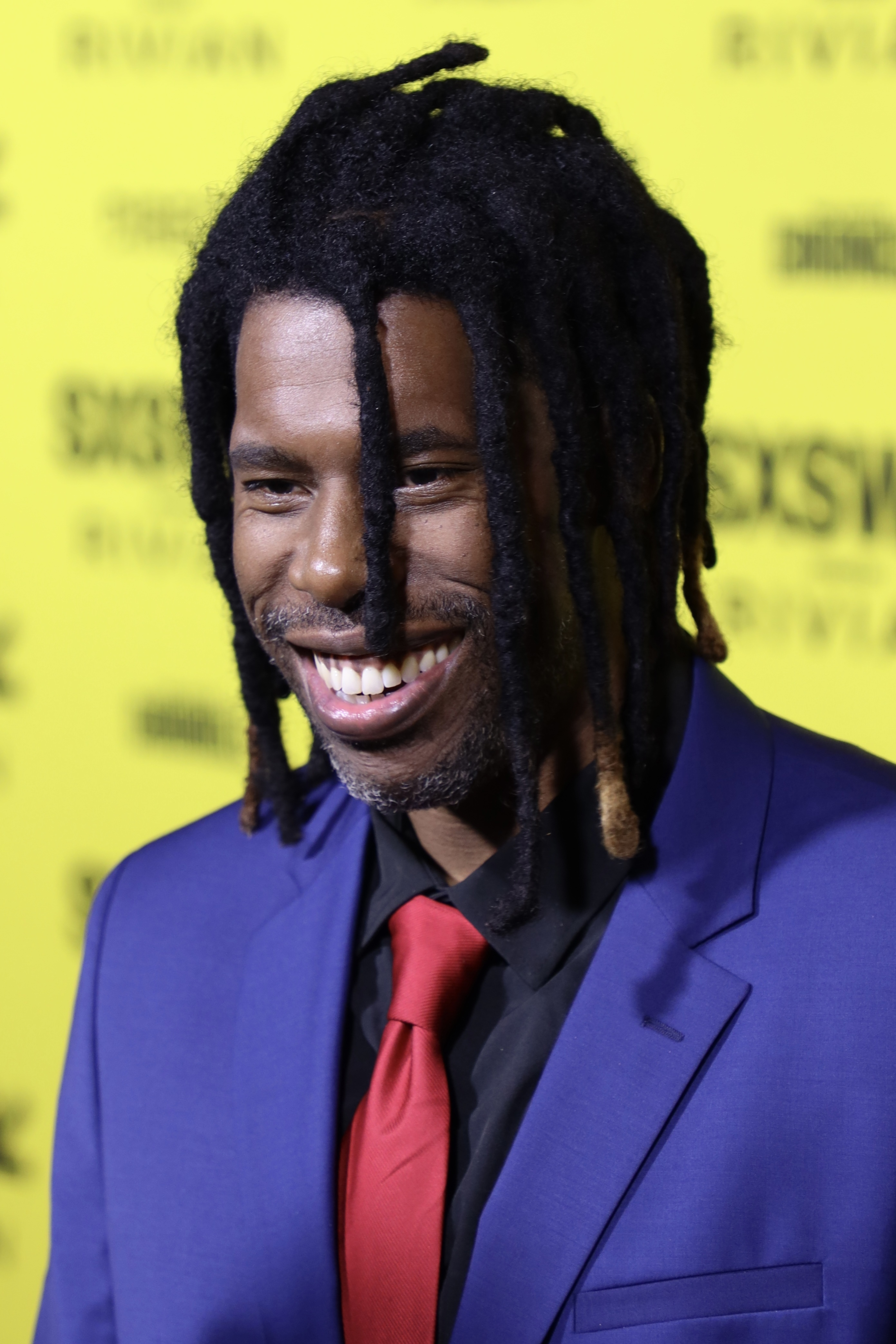
Flying Lotus (pictured in 2025), producer of Big Mama

In the past few years, Flying Lotus' musical activity slowed down as he focused on side projects. He ventured into his filmmaking career with horror film Kuso (2017) and sci-fi film Ash (2025), in which he scored both of its soundtracks. He also worked on production for a Magic Johnson docuseries, iPhone ringtones, and a Netflix anime score. His previous non-score project was the house-based EP Spirit Box (2024). At the time, his latest studio album was Flamagra (2019), and shelved a nearly-completed album in 2023 due to conflicting with other projects.

== Production ==
At the time Flying Lotus finished Ash, he went back into making music. Wanting to create something "truly electronic", he decided not to continue the same route from the film. He studied audio engineering, experimented with recording sources, and used FM synthesis, evolving into Big Mama. He mainly experimented on the EP in New Zealand, looking at it as a "blank sketchbook" instead of a "grid machine". Unlike Flying Lotus' previous works, no loops were used on Big Mama, instead spending two months on producing the project with 10–15 seconds of new music per day before connecting them together as a "palette of sounds", collecting various sounds in "formless sound designs", using only a laptop and controller. Big Mama was entirely produced by Flying Lotus, while Daddy Kev serves as its mastering engineer.

While producing Big Mama, Flying Lotus visualized images of "getting shot out of a cannon", keeping the image of a "cartoony attack on the city" intact as an album artwork idea, wanting to do something "pure fun" as a release from working on Ash. Its artwork was created by Christopher Ian Macfarlane, inspired by the aesthetics of '90s cartoons, particularly The Simpsons and The Ren & Stimpy Show. It features the titular character, representing "a bomb with a big booty", destroying a futuristic city with "other kaiju mechs". Flying Lotus and Macfarlane interfered several times on the size of the character's butt, emphasizing it as a "priority on the screen".

== Composition ==
=== Overview ===
Big Mama is an electronic music EP containing seven tracks at a runtime of thirteen minutes, shining as a spiritual successor to Flying Lotus' EP Pattern+Grid World (2010) and sharing "free-jazzy breaks" from his studio album You're Dead! (2014). The EP is described by The Fader as a "13-minute flurry of sounds" dense in "tangled percussion and synth lines" made without any loops, unlike Flying Lotus' previous works that involved looping. Explaining the radical change, he stated that "every bar is unique" and wanted to make it feel unpredictable. Described by Flying Lotus as "experimental, maximalist, hyperfast, electronic bursts of energy", Big Mama uses multiple instruments, including a harp, electric guitar, bass, and saxophone. Sonically, its transitions between tracks are "deliberately abrasive" that result in a sequence that's contrastive while connected by "frantic logic", exploring "inner chaos and pure, unadulterated joy".

=== Tracks ===
"In the Forest – Day"
"In the Forest – Day" transcends through "formless bleeps and skitters" in minimalistic Game Boy-esque production.

"Horse Nuke"
"Horse Nuke" chaotically mixes IDM with Jersey club-esque booms and deconstructed club.

The opening track, "Big Mama", boosts the EP as a "sonic declaration" within 36 seconds, highly reminiscent of Adult Swim bumpers Flying Lotus composed previously in the 2000s. The second track, "Captain Kernel", transitions minimalistic ambient music into a "16-bit reprise" of Yumiko Kanki-esque jazz fusion, expressing "neon chords over jazzy keyboard runs". The third track, "Antelope Onigiri", compresses ten various breakdowns into an acid-bass track with "synth-drenched blinks and blistering tempos" in less than two minutes. The fourth track, "In the Forest – Day", conceptualizes around "formless bleeps and skitters" swirling into a softer outro interrupted by a "half-hidden dreamscape", sonically the opposite to Flying Lotus' EP Spirit Box (2024). Even when it stops for minimalism, he adds a light amount of layering beyond conventional Game Boy-esque music.

Following a harsh transition, the fifth track, "Brobobasher", an interpretation of the early Chicago house scene reminiscent of DJ Shy FX, starts with a reflective piano track before shifting to electro production with four-on-the-floor kicks and "hallucinatory pads" and concluding with "noodling jazz fusion". The sixth track, "Horse Nuke", an IDM track in a "bassy" level, begins from an "opening drone" into a chaotic mix of Jersey club-esque booms and "plasticky arpeggios" akin to deconstructed club. The seventh and final track, "Pink Dream", combines both arcade melodies and Alice Coltrane piano tracks in a way that builds up to its end through "winding notes and beat switches" in a zany slush reminiscent of his previous studio albums: Los Angeles (2008), Cosmogramma (2010), and Until the Quiet Comes (2012).

== Promotion and release ==
On February 5, 2026, Flying Lotus announced the release of Big Mama on March 6, though his record label Brainfeeder. It is his first release under the record label, since he founded it in 2008. Promoting the album, Flying Lotus released a teaser trailer for an accompanying short film, and no singles were released. On March 6, Big Mama was released to streaming services, digital download, and screen-printed blue vinyl, along with a stop motion short film directed by Daniel Larsson and Tomas Redigh of Rymdreglage. Commercially, the EP peaked at number 34 on the UK Album Downloads chart and at number 51 on the North American College and Community Radio (NACC) chart.

== Critical reception ==
Professional ratings
Review scores
| Source | Rating |
|---|---|
| Pitchfork | 5.2/10 |
| Spectrum Culture | 65% |
| Sputnikmusic | 3.7/5 |

Reviews of Big Mama, specifically the artist's new direction in style, were mixed. Those from Sputnikmusic, DJ Mag and EDM Identity welcomed the artist's move into Iglooghost-esque cartoony colorfulness and pacing. Chris Fulton of Spectrum Culture positively compared Big Mama's production to Flying Lotus' Adult Swim bumps from the 2000s, but found its exploration of chaos as "discordant", suggesting Flying Lotus' preferred the "immediate thrill" of the project over a "lasting melodic statement". The EP's worst critic, Sam Goldner of Pitchfork, felt the artist got himself dug into "immature tendencies" with "trollish sound effects", rushed ideas, and surface-level approaches to its genres.

== Track listing ==
Volume 1
| No. | Title | Length |
|---|---|---|
| 1. | "Big Mama" | 0:36 |
| 2. | "Captain Kernel" | 3:04 |
| 3. | "Antelope Onigiri" | 1:46 |
| 4. | "In the Forest – Day" | 2:06 |
| 5. | "Brobobasher" | 1:51 |
| 6. | "Horse Nuke" | 2:36 |
| 7. | "Pink Dream" | 1:23 |
| Total length: | | 13:22 |

Volume 2
| No. | Title | Length |
|---|---|---|
| 1. | "Big Mama (EP continuous mix)" | 13:21 |
| Total length: | | 26:43 |

== Personnel ==
Credits were adapted from Tidal.

- Flying Lotus – production, all instruments, arrangements, mixing
- Daddy Kev – mastering
- Christopher Ian Macfarlane – artwork

== Charts ==
| Chart (2026) | Peak position |
|---|---|
| UK Album Downloads (Official Charts) | 34 |
| US & Canadian College Radio Top 200 (NACC) | 51 |
