= Until the Quiet Comes =

2012 album by American electronic music producer Flying Lotus

Studio album by Flying Lotus
- Released: September 26, 2012
- Recorded: 2011–12
- Studio: Home recording (Mount Washington)
- Genres: Electronica; electronic jazz; psychedelia
- Length: 46:42
- Label: Warp
- Producer: Flying Lotus

Flying Lotus chronology
Pattern+Grid World (2010)	Until the Quiet Comes (2012)	Duality (2012)

Singles from Until the Quiet Comes
- 1. "See Thru to U" Released: August 16, 2012; 2. "Putty Boy Strut" Released: September 19, 2012

Until the Quiet Comes is the fourth studio album by American electronic music producer Flying Lotus, released on September 26, 2012 by Warp Records. Flying Lotus was inspired to create the album by psychedelic music, African percussion, and concepts of the human subconscious and dream world. He recorded for two years at his home in Los Angeles, experimenting with different mixing techniques and dynamics while primarily using an Ableton Live sequencer along with other instruments and software. The producer was accompanied on certain songs by guest vocalists, including Erykah Badu, Thom Yorke, and Laura Darlington. The album also continued his creative partnership with bassist Thundercat, who had appeared on Flying Lotus' 2010 record Cosmogramma.

An electronic jazz album, Until the Quiet Comes features free jazz elements, varying musical tones, contrasting scales, and shifts in rhythmic feel. Its songs are sequenced together and characterized by what music journalists noted to be ghostly vocal production, irregular drum beats, pulsating percussive textures, trembling basslines, trilled synthesizers, and fluctuating samples. The album has a journey-like concept and dreamy musical narrative, which Flying Lotus conceived while imagining himself in the process of astral projection. He later said the album could be interpreted uniquely by listeners; it has been interpreted by writers as a musical accompaniment to dreams and a process of emotional introspection by the producer.

Until the Quiet Comes was marketed with two singles and a short film featuring music from the album. Flying Lotus also promoted the album with an international concert tour from October to November 2012, performing at venues in North America and abroad. The album debuted at number 34 on the Billboard 200 and sold 13,000 copies in its first week of release. It was a widespread critical success, receiving praise for its complex music and Flying Lotus' sound engineering.

== Background ==
I feel like that [dream] world fascinates me so much. That feeling is very present in the artist's mind where creative ideas flourish. The notion of the unknown and beyond is something that I've always been curious about, and the music and work that do [sic] is where I can ask those questions.

— Flying Lotus, Vibe

In 2010, Flying Lotus released his third album Cosmogramma to critical acclaim and mainstream exposure. He recorded the album while grieving his mother's death, and titled it as a reference to his late great-aunt Alice Coltrane. The album showcased his dense, loose mix of electronic and live instrumentation with avant-garde jazz, dance, and hip-hop influences. During its recording, he developed a creative relationship with contributing bassist Thundercat, a member of his Brainfeeder record label. They continued working together on Flying Lotus' 2010 EP Pattern+Grid World, which continued the dense electronic style of Cosmogramma. They developed more musical ideas together, from which Flying Lotus culled and produced for Thundercat's debut album The Golden Age of Apocalypse in 2011.

For Until the Quiet Comes, Flying Lotus was inspired by African percussion music and psychedelic bands such as Silver Apples, Can, Stereolab, Portishead, and Gentle Giant. He also returned to listening to the music of his relatives Alice and John Coltrane after listening excessively to austere electronica while recording Cosmogramma. Musically, he wanted to avoid repeating himself and chose a more minimal direction for the album, seeking to eschew the "strange sense of urgency" of Cosmogramma's music for "tension and release". He elaborated on his direction for the album in an interview for The National, saying that "I think I'd have been in a bad position if I tried to recreate the same energy as I did on Cosmogramma – like, go in further. How about we pull back, try to do something that gets to the core of the emotional sentiment. Not so grand, more intimate. But still have the core of what it is."

Conceptually, Flying Lotus pursued human-subconscious and dream world themes. He sought to tone down Cosmogramma's grandiose, universal concept and create a timeless, journey-like work with Until the Quiet Comes, from which he felt listeners could interpret their own stories. He imagined himself astral projecting when conceiving the album and tried to translate ideas from fiction he had read into music, including holographic universes, metaphysics, New Age philosophy, and astrodynamics. In conceiving a narrative for the album, he drew on Joseph Campbell's hero's journey literary theory to introduce a world, characters, and situations musically. He characterized the album as both "a collage of mystical states, dreams, sleep and lullabies", and "a children's record, a record for kids to dream to". He clarified the idea in an interview for Spin as "that whole experience of being innocent in this new world that you don't really understand. I imagined Little Nemo on a flying bed floating over the city, and this is the soundtrack to it." Flying Lotus felt more confident in his ideas and as a recording artist after striving to distinguish himself from his contemporaries on previous albums.

== Recording and production ==
[Flying Lotus] used to be printing mixes that were completely maxed, so this record was definitely different ... he's become more aware of the limitations of plug-ins, how far he can really overload things without the signal falling apart. Looking at way back until today, his compositional understanding, his ability to balance arrangements, has really moved forward into a less-cluttered headspace.

— Daddy Kev, Electronic Musician

Flying Lotus started working on Until the Quiet Comes at his home in Mount Washington, Los Angeles, which featured more acoustic space than his previous residence in Echo Park. He recorded the album for two years, using a spacious room there as a recording studio. He revisited scrapped ideas from the sessions for Thundercat's debut album and revised their direction for Until the Quiet Comes. The song "Hunger" developed from a demo he had recorded for the soundtrack to one of the Twilight films, and "Sultan's Request" was performed live by Flying Lotus for three years before the album. For "Electric Candyman", he used a beat he had prepared for sessions that ultimately fell through with Burial, and he used a five-year-old recording with Samiyam for the second half of "The Nightcaller".

Flying Lotus recorded Until the Quiet Comes in a three-part process—first composing rough drafts for songs, then refining them for several months with additional instrumentation to make them substantial, and finally mixing the songs for a cohesive album. Unlike with his previous work, he concentrated on his music's dynamics rather than just its production when working on the album. Interested in music theory and arrangements, he started taking piano lessons at the beginning of the album's recording to learn more chords and progressions. Rather than emphasize conventional song structure elements such as hooks and choruses, Flying Lotus composed instrumentals that he found to be more intellectual and less danceable than Cosmogramma and treated them as the basis of tracks when recording the album. He also recorded melodic refrains to evoke feelings of childlike innocence on songs.

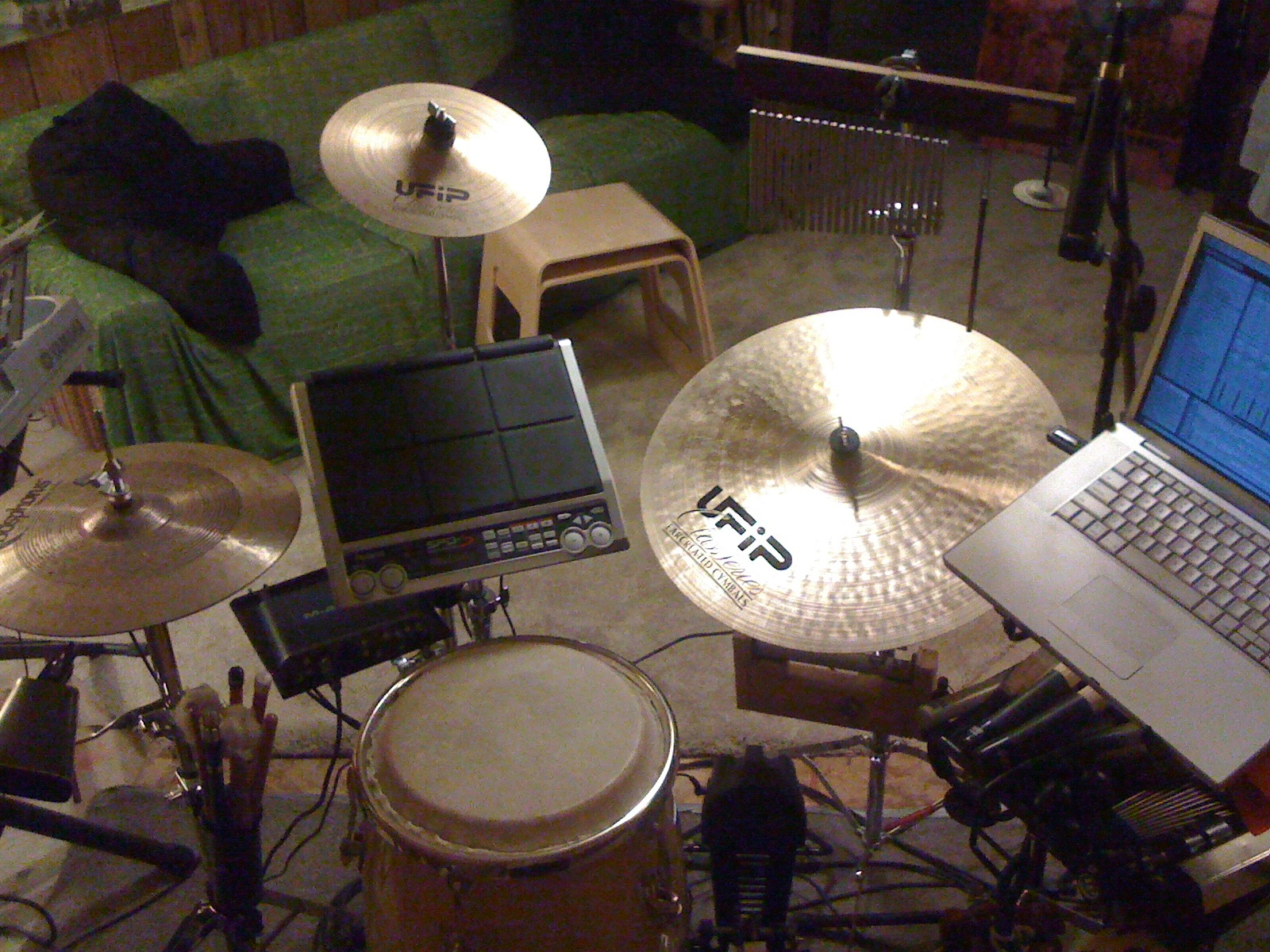
Flying Lotus used analog and digital instruments including percussion and the Ableton Live sequencer (pictured).

Flying Lotus worked primarily with an Ableton Live music sequencer through his MacBook Pro laptop. At his home studio, he had upgraded monitors acquired from after his move there, and various digital and analog instruments, including a drum kit, a Fender Rhodes piano, Wurlitzer electric pianos, Access Virus and Minimoog Voyager synthesizers, a drum machine, three Mac Powerbooks, and a DSP unit. He played drums without quantizing them and referred to the personal library of samples he had amassed over his career while producing the album. He recorded the song "Dream to Me" the day after purchasing a microKORG synthesizer. He ultimately recorded over 60 songs for the album before editing them down.

To attain certain dynamics on songs, Flying Lotus studied different mixing techniques and switched software midway through the album's recording. He later cited the switch as the reason for the album's completion being overdue, although he felt that it was productive to challenge himself as a student of music. Flying Lotus employed a trial and error approach to mixing and applied his new knowledge of compression to attain a more satisfactory result before the album's master. He also sought to limit distracting frequencies and segues in favor of more important sounds throughout the album. To make certain sounds more affecting, he used the side-chain compression technique to trigger compression of different organ, strings, and bass sounds upon a drum kick on a song. He said of his production and the music's dynamic range in an interview for Electronic Musician, "I've been learning to bring things down before I even start. I'll start composing a track at like −8dB, then I have all this headroom to play with afterward. I've learned how to tuck and limit things, learned to EQ before you limit."

As with his previous releases, Until the Quiet Comes was mastered by engineer Daddy Kev at his Echo Chamber Studio in Eagle Rock. He used a Pro Tools 9 workstation and various EQ plug-ins on his Mac Pro, while working at a 24-bit, 96 kHz audio quality to comply with iTunes' "Mastered for iTunes" regulations. To preserve the tracks' original dynamics, Daddy Kev used a signal chain that processed both digital and analog signals. He found the mastering process to be "very intimate" and likened it to "giving birth" for Flying Lotus, saying in an interview, "We may go through multiple mixes so a certain 808 can sit right in the pocket for him, and while he's finishing his edits its my job to boost just the right things by a decibel or two, and keep things sonically correct." He used both professional and club-oriented amplifiers and monitors to minimize harmonic distortion and maintain Flying Lotus' minimalist aesthetic, which, along with his need to find a quiet mental space, inspired the album's title: "I wanted to set people up to this idea, before they even heard it, that the quiet was a key word in the whole thing ... [A] part of pulling it back is some kind of growing up."

=== Collaborations ===
Flying Lotus collaborated with other musicians for additional elements on songs. He worked with instrumentalist and musical director Miguel Atwood Ferguson to incorporate strings arrangements to songs. Thundercat played live bass on nine of the album's songs. To develop basslines for songs, Flying Lotus had Thundercat's bass plugged into a DI unit of a FireWire interface as he improvised riffs to Flying Lotus' suggestions. Flying Lotus captured flat-levelled bass ideas into the interface, which allowed him to manipulate their tone and integrate them with digital instruments and samples on songs. He attributes the continuity of the album's music to Thundercat's bass playing. For certain tracks on the album, Flying Lotus wanted to use vocalists that would "see their sound as texture as opposed to the song", and said of this preference in an interview for Vibe, "Sometimes singers overdo it so that you only focus on the voice, which is cool sometimes, but it's my record – I'm producing it – so the songs should be about the track as a whole. The people that are my favorites are ones who have such a respect for what's already there. They don't try to approach it thinking they're going to turn it into a song, but rather going to add to it."

Flying Lotus enlisted other vocalists, including Thom Yorke on "Electric Candyman", Laura Darlington on "Phantasm", Erykah Badu on "See Thru to U", and Thundercat on "DMT Song". Yorke wanted to be involved with the album after collaborating on "...And the World Laughs with You" for Cosmogramma, and exchanged his vocals via email. Flying Lotus admired him for knowing "when things work and [when] they don't. He doesn't bullshit in that way. He spends his time wisely. I wish I could say that about a lot more people." He met Badu through Thundercat, who had played in her backing band and collaborated with her on The Golden Age of Apocalypse, and started working on her own upcoming album while recording Until the Quiet Comes. Flying Lotus also planned to work with Jonny Greenwood, but the collaboration fell through. Instead, he appropriated music from one of Greenwood's film soundtracks for the song "Hunger", for which Greenwood is credited as composer.

== Music ==
Until the Quiet Comes conforms to its own internal logic. Tracks shudder to a halt midway through their development only to return as mutated shadows of their former selves and continually jarring juxtapositions of disparate stylistic features punctuate the album's progression.

— Thomas May, musicOMH

Until the Quiet Comes is characterized by varying musical tones, contrasting scales, both consonant and dissonant sounds, counterpoint, and shifts in feel. Its complex, diverse soundscapes deviate from popular music song forms and employ contrast and improvisational adjustments in mood, structure, and time signature. Darryl Kirchner of The Huffington Post notes an emphasis on timbre throughout the album. Mark Richardson of Pitchfork observes Flying Lotus "putting a smaller frame around each individual part" throughout the album's shifts and finds the "energy" to be "just as strong" as on his previous albums, but "concentrated into a smaller space." Although he finds it less "imposing" than its predecessor, Thomas May of musicOMH comments that "Until the Quiet Comes is like a chamber concerto to Cosmogramma's symphony", noting "an increased sense of space and separation" on the former.

Songs on the album incorporate ghostly vocal production, winding basslines, uptempo drum-and-bass fills, broad orchestral elements, pulsating percussive textures, bright keyboards, trilled synthesizers, and fluctuating samples. They are sequenced together and exhibit a diminishing pace from the end of one track to the start of another. Joe Tacopino of Rolling Stone views that the album's guest vocalists "float into [Flying Lotus's] realm like visitors, just as fragile and malleable as the other elements he employs. This reiterates the album's feel as one complete story, instead of disparate songs." Fellow music journalist Vincent Pollard comments that most of the vocals are "used as subtle textures" and observes Flying Lotus "employing more organic tropes in his digital mix". He incorporates horn arrangements and live drum patterns, while his programmed beats evoke the "in the pocket" drumming of percussionists such as Rashied Ali. The songs also exhibits Flying Lotus' characteristic mix of skittering, muffled percussion atop slightly irregular drum beats, accompanied by Thundercat's trembling basslines.

Stylistically, the album eschews Flying Lotus' hip-hop roots for jazz influences, including free form jazz tonality and undertones, and jazz-based time signatures and patterns. Gabrielle Ahern of CMJ calls it "a moody, electronic version of experimental jazz." Jonny Ensall of Time Out views the album as "a digital jazz record which pushes hip hop beats and R&B melodies into bold, new syncopated and atonal territory." Tony Ware of Electronic Musician attributes "certain chord choices and the interest in astral mystical states that permeates Until the Quiet Comes" to Flying Lotus' "family lineage" of jazz musicians. Uncut finds it "often reminiscent of his auntie's work", while Consequence of Sound's Derek Staples perceives a "free jazz aesthetic" similar to "his great-uncle John Coltrane's Ascension", viewing both albums as "exercise[s] in dense rhythmic layers and melodic dissonance." The album also repurposes elements of pop, soul, fusion, and psychedelia in a modern classical fashion. Q describes the album as "a lush, almost psychedelic mood piece." Lucy Jones of NME attributes the album's "meander[ing] and experiment[ing]" to a progressive rock influence.

=== Concept and interpretations ===
Until the Quiet Comes has been described by Uncut and Mojo as having a dreamy musical narrative; the latter magazine said it is, "quite literally, a dream album". Andy Beta from Spin likened it to the "dreams within dreams within dreams" concept from the 2010 film Inception. Karen Lawler of State said "if the limbo between awake and sleeping, dreams and nightmares could be expressed through music, this album might well be it." Jeff Weiss, writing in LA Weekly, felt the record had a loose concept that "surrounds the nocturnal visions of a child lost in spacedust dreams" and likens it to a narcotic film in the vein of Little Nemo and Michel Gondry, writing that "swirling voices seem like clouds communing. Snare crashes mimic obscene villains. Hard beats propel chase scenes. Basslines gurgle like goofy dancing sidekicks. Erykah Badu plays the all-powerful good witch. Thom Yorke guests as the gnomish sorcerer with the seraphic yawp."

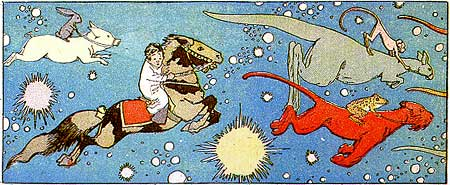
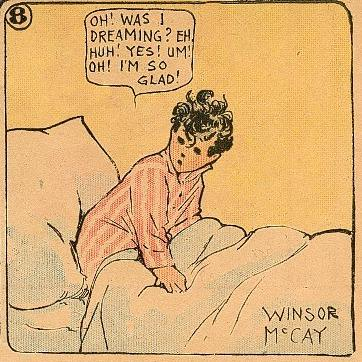
The album's concept was inspired by Little Nemo, a fantasy comic strip about a little boy's nightly dreams.

In the opinion of Will Ryan from Beats Per Minute, Until the Quiet Comes was another "journey" concept work by Flying Lotus, but distinguished it as an introspective, "subconscious" journey following the "temporal" journey idea of his 2006 debut 1983, the "geographical" 2008 album Los Angeles, and the "cosmic", "out-and-out musical" Cosmogramma. Rory Gibb from The Quietus wrote that the narrative on this album veered into "the corridors" of Flying Lotus' "own mind", interpreting his guest vocalists as "disembodied phantoms, reanimated figments of his imagination stripped of agency and directed to their roles by [his] subconscious." Gibb argued that Until the Quiet Comes was "an important and significant album" partly for engaging with "grand narratives" such as "the shifting identities of both humans and electronic music forms in a digital age", and "the internet's erosion of memory processes".

Reef Younis of Clash perceived an emotional context to the album, writing that, "where [Flying Lotus] grieved on Cosmogramma, he believes on Until The Quiet Comes and there's a burgeoning sense of hope and coherence and optimism". Arnold Pan of PopMatters calls Until the Quiet Comes "a subliminal soundtrack to the postmodern experience of everyday life" and views that Flying Lotus' subtle, "sentient and sensual" details throughout the album's music represent "an undertone of yearning emotion and even soulfulness that separates [his] aesthetic on Quiet from that of other producer-types who may be just as proficient, technically speaking."

=== Songs ===
The opening track "All In" incorporates bells, kick and snare drums, shakers, harps, guitar, and electric bass. It features a reverberating, high-pitched note, whose discordant sound is subsequently offset by keyboard flourishes and cursory snare drums. Lilting background vocals during the song's melodic section lead to a bass kick and aggressive drum patterns. The wistful "Getting There" expands on the previous track with a basic drum kick, Sonar blip sounds, chimes, and a walking bassline. It has heavy emphasis on the first and third beat of every measure. "Until the Colours Come" contains modulated synthesizers. "Heave(n)" features bright, round keyboards, jazz and electronica elements, and tonal shading. Mark Richardson of Pitchfork views that the music from "All In" to "Heave(n)" comprise an opening section on the album that "functions as a sort of miniature suite of downtempo jazz."

"Tiny Tortures" features echoing, tendrillar guitar, minimal glitch sounds, and post-rock melodies. The song begins with a skeletal, irregular rhythm, comprising a digital wood block, snare drum, and hissing cymbals, that is subsequently contrasted by Thundercat's harmonic bass runs. "All the Secrets" has a new-age sound and features Casiotone breakdowns, deftly timed vocal samples, restless drumming, poignant piano, and post-dub elements. "Sultan's Request" has a square wave bassline, tense synthesizers, and transitioning pitches and textures, spanning from a low-end drop to an upper register of high-pitched samples and steady hand claps. "Putty Boy Strut" features an alien critter voice, complex drum programming, and acousmatic jazz guitars. It concludes with a brief violin section.

"See Thru to U" incorporates jazz fusion and funk styles. It features a loose arrangement, tom-tom drums, hi-hats, double bass, and tribal rhythms. Erykah Badu's vocals on the song are distorted and layered into loose, overlapping patterns, scat arrangements, and high-pitched vocal runs. "DMT Song" and "Nightcaller" serve as the album's centerpiece. The former song, titled after the natural psychedelic compound dimethyltryptamine, incorporates jazz-funk and light tenor to chorused falsetto vocals by Thundercat. It transitions into "The Nightcaller", which has analog 4/4 percussion, piercing synthesizers, and interplay between Thundercat's bass and virtuosic cello. The song's smooth, muffled beat climaxes as a euphoric crescendo. The densely textured title track features expressive bass playing by Thundercat, continuous gong and handclaps, and J Dilla-like keyboard. "Only If You Wanna" is a futuristic jazz trio piece with both digital and analog sounds. AllMusic's Andy Kellman delineates the songs from "See Thru to U" to "Only If You Wanna" as the album's most musically connected and "least divisible" section.

"me Yesterday//Corded"
28-second sample of "me Yesterday//Corded"

"Electric Candyman" has a dreamy R&B style and features distant, cooing vocals by Thom Yorke, a rattling drum sample, ghostly drones, and anthropoid shrieks. Yorke chants on the song, "look into my mirror and say my name", a reference to the titular character in the 1992 film Candyman. Flying Lotus said of his vocals on the song, "I like it when he gets into that spooky pocket. People are like, that doesn't sound like Thom, make it sound more like Thom – but I'm like, it's my album." The electro-acoustic "Phantasm" contains slinky vocals by Laura Darlington, metronome clicks, oscillating string arrangements, and agitated downtempo sounds. "me Yesterday//Corded" features bright arpeggios, twisted bass grooves, and a subsuming vocal chorus. Flying Lotus characterizes the song as a reflection of his past emotions. "Dream to Me" has overlapping synthesizers and serves as an exodus in the album's conceptual arc.

== Marketing and sales ==
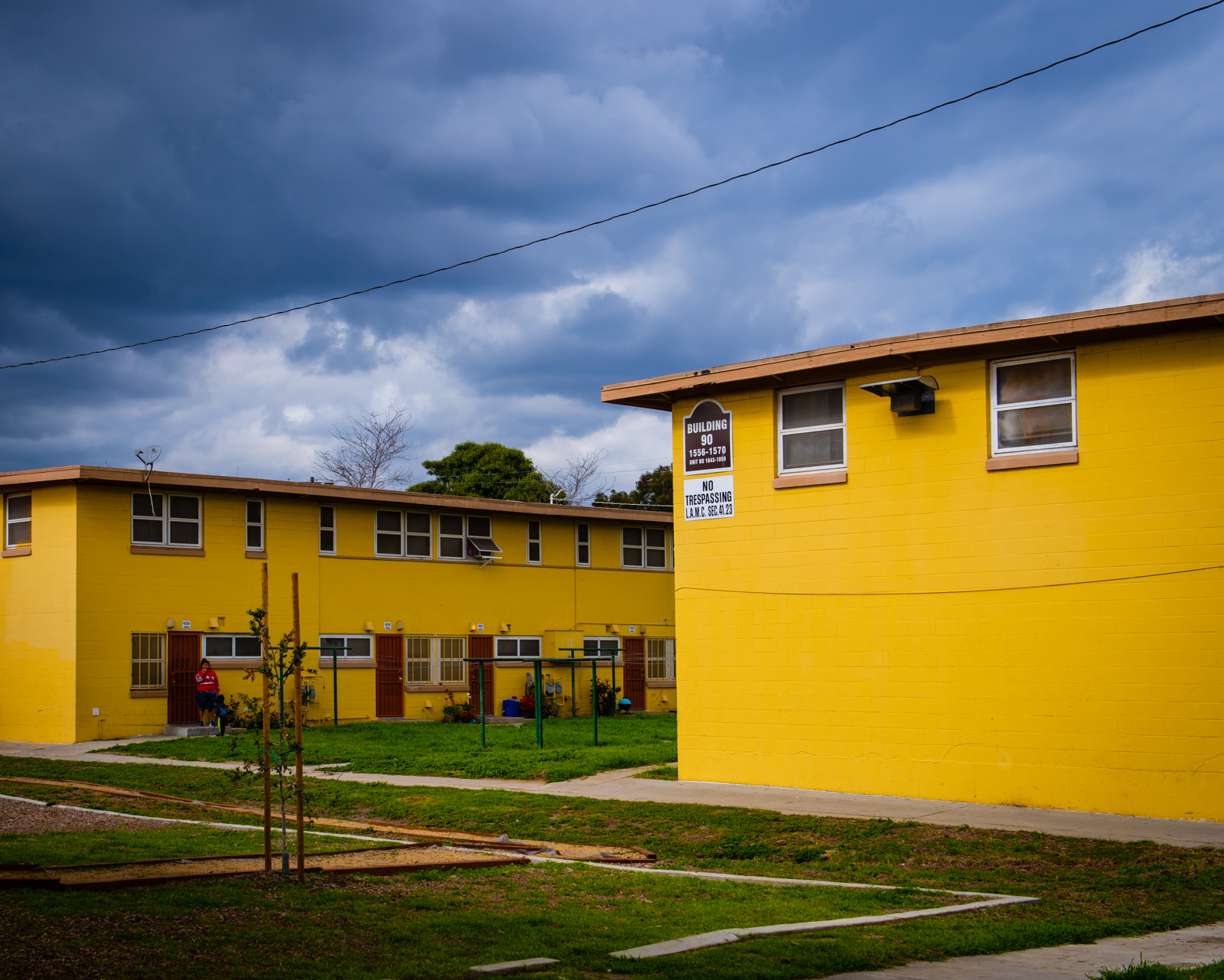
Nickerson Gardens in Watts, the setting for Until the Quiet Comes' promotional film of the same name

Two singles were released to promote Until the Quiet Comes, beginning with "See Thru to U" on August 16, 2012, as a digital download on iTunes. It was accompanied by the release of an abstract music video online. On September 17, Flying Lotus released a teaser video called Small Moments, in which previews of the album's songs were accompanied by mysterious, botanical imagery. "Putty Boy Strut" was released on September 19 with an accompanying animated, robot-themed video by Cyriak. A music video for "Tiny Tortures" was released on November 29 and featured Elijah Wood playing a depressed man without a right arm who envisions objects in his room recreating his arm, but is revealed to be torturing himself.

A short film promoting the album was released on September 6, 2012. It was titled after the album and directed by Kahlil Joseph, who shot it in 35 mm film at the Nickerson Gardens housing project in Watts, Los Angeles and incorporated three songs from the album—"See Thru to U", "Hunger", and "Getting There". The film was intended to be a tragic depiction of urban life featuring Joseph's interpretations of innocence, violence, and death. It begins with an African-American youth's death, segues into a scene of affection shared among other African-American males, and concludes with the shooting of another, whose death is reversed to the effect of a dance. A scene in the film also features an inner city youth wearing a shirt bearing the words "J Dilla Changed My Life", an allusion to the influence of J Dilla on Flying Lotus. The film received praise from critics, and its viral success led to Warp Records' decision to pitch it to a music video network; it was ultimately accepted and aired by MTV2. Hilton Als of The New Yorker called the film "an amalgamation of horrifying beauty" and wrote of Joseph's use of rewind, "the character's fall becomes a kind of dance—for life."

Until the Quiet Comes was first released in Japan on September 26, 2012, as a CD, before a wider release on all formats—CD, vinyl, and digital—by Warp Records on October 2. It was also made available for streaming online from September 26 to October 2, the date of its release in North America. Until the Quiet Comes was sent as a single 47-minute digital track to music critics who would be reviewing it. Flying Lotus intended for the album to be listened as a whole instead of skimmed through by listeners. During October, he appeared at several release events, including in-store appearances, signings, DJ sets, and interview sessions at music venues and retailers.

In the first week of release, the album debuted at number 34 on the Billboard 200, selling 13,000 copies. By October 7, 2012, it had sold 14,000 copies, according to Nielsen SoundScan. The album also debuted at number 34 on the UK Albums Chart, becoming Flying Lotus' highest-charting record there. In Belgium, it charted for four weeks, peaking at number 26.

== Critical reception ==
Professional ratings
Aggregate scores
Source	Rating
AnyDecentMusic?	8.2/10
Metacritic	83/100
Review scores
Source	Rating
AllMusic	4.5/5 stars
The A.V. Club	A−
Financial Times	4/5 stars
The Guardian	3/5 stars
The New Zealand Herald	4/5 stars
NME	9/10
Pitchfork	8.5/10
Q	4/5 stars
Rolling Stone	3.5/5 stars
Spin	7/10

Until the Quiet Comes was met with widespread critical acclaim. At Metacritic, which assigns a normalized rating out of 100 to reviews from mainstream publications, the album received an average score of 83, based on 36 reviews.

The album was hailed by NME magazine's Lucy Jones as "the sound of the future" and by Scott Kara of The New Zealand Herald as a "masterpiece of sound engineering". Reviewing for AllMusic, Andy Kellman said Flying Lotus "not only peels away layers from his sound but organizes his tracks into a gracefully flowing sequence" on what is "his most accessible and creative release yet." Filter magazine's Kyle Lemmon found his musicianship deft and the songs invariably "vaporous and angelic or menacing and silhouetted", and Thomas May from musicOMH praised both the difficult concept and its execution. "With an unprecedented melodic disposition and busy yet rarely cluttered arrangements", May wrote, "this album possesses remarkable poise and balance in the face of its fearsome complexity." Drowned in Sound's Jazz Monroe believed it may prove to be the producer's best album because of his ability to "close the schism between the true avant-garde and the leftfield mainstream". Arnold Pan of PopMatters said that his amalgamated music was achieved with admirable ease and lucidity, as Flying Lotus "conducts a master class on both how to create flow as well as how to maintain it through an entire album." While finding the record's "complicated brilliance" less "boisterous" than Cosmogramma, Jonah Bromwich of The A.V. Club claimed the album "does a better job than its predecessor of weaving together the tangled strands of" disparate styles and concluded, "after multiple listens, the album reveals itself to be as nuanced, as subtle, and a lot more digestible". Also in comparison to Cosmogramma, Vincent Pollard wrote in Exclaim! that it accomplishes a more spiritual yet unpretentious depth, resulting in "one of the most rewarding and beautiful albums of the year".

Some reviewers were less impressed. State magazine's Karen Lawler said the songs are "too short for any single musical concept to fully develop", and Alex Macpherson from The Guardian found the record to be "packed full of ideas" on tracks that "feel less like fully fleshed-out compositions than lightly drawn sketches started, but not always finished". In Rolling Stone, Will Hermes applauded Flying Lotus' "taste for 21st-century soul jazz with swarming high-end displays", but said "it all adds up to something so captivating that vocal guests ... can get a little lost. Although maybe that's the point". Robert Christgau named the title track and "Sultan's Request" as highlights but was lukewarm about the jazz-inspired musical concept, saying that it "achieves the sopranos-and-tinkle phase of sophisticated aural pansensuality". Jazz critic Tom Hull called it a "dreamy series of blips and voices" that is "mostly pleasant enough but a couple trigger my classical gag reflex."

== Touring ==
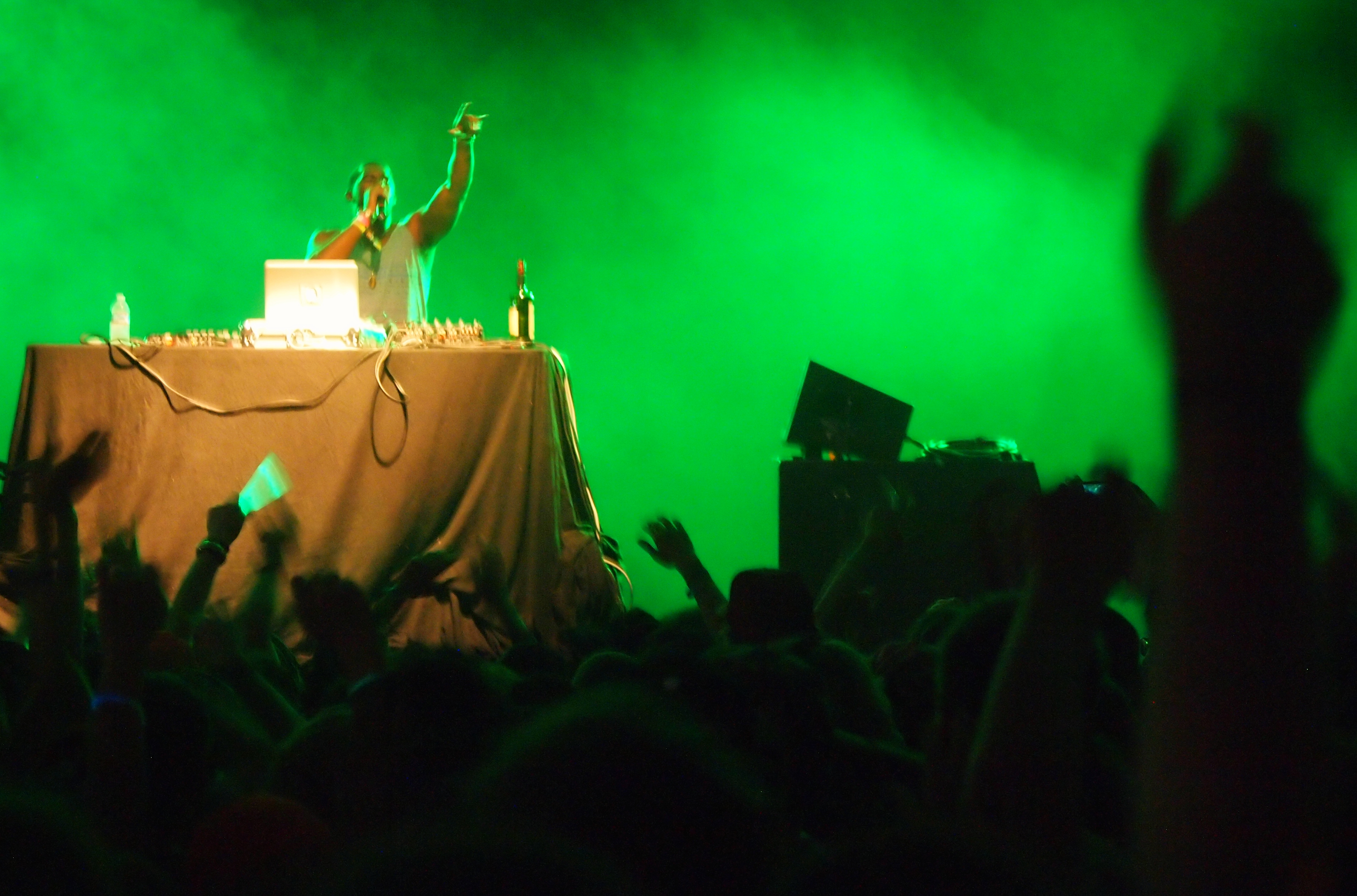
Flying Lotus performing in 2012

Flying Lotus first performed in promotion of the album at the Hollywood Bowl in Los Angeles on September 23, 2012. He then embarked on an international tour for the album during October to November 2012, playing 11 concert dates in North America and eight dates abroad, including Europe and Japan. He performed strictly with his laptop, and excluded takes of songs he had recorded with Miguel Atwood Ferguson's string quartet, feeling that the strings would not translate live. Along with his own material, Flying Lotus included remixes of other artists' songs in his live sets, including Jay-Z, Alicia Keys, and Kanye West.

Flying Lotus felt that his grasp on new mixing techniques helped make his live shows more "evolved and changed a little bit", telling Exclaim! in October 2012, "It's more dynamic. But still a party! Not like my albums, [which] are more like personal exchange; [live] it's nice to have that social experience." Reviewing his performance at Danforth Music Hall that month, Now journalist Kevin Ritchie observed a "resoundingly maximal aesthetic and sound" that was "way more bombastic EDM" than the album's "IDM abstraction". As an example, Ritchie cited the producer's mixing of "the recognizable with the weird, like when Kanye West's Mercy gave way to the hand-claps of Quiet cut Putty Boy Strut." Flying Lotus also worked with longtime collaborator Dr. Strangeloop to create collage-like imagery during the shows, including geometric visuals synched to the performed music. Joshua P. Ferguson of Time Out wrote of the visual effects in Flying Lotus' performance at Metro Chicago, "all manner of Tron-like halos, expanding and contracting orbs, starscapes and unidentifiable amorphous globs of color raced, shot and oozed their way across screens placed both in front of and behind Flying Lotus."

== Track listing ==
No.	Title	Writer(s)	Producer(s)	Length
1.	"All In"	Steven Ellison	Flying Lotus	2:59
2.	"Getting There" (featuring Niki Randa)	Ellison, Nicole A. Randa	Flying Lotus	1:49
3.	"Until the Colours Come"	Ellison	Flying Lotus	1:07
4.	"Heave(n)"	Ellison	Flying Lotus	2:22
5.	"Tiny Tortures"	Ellison	Flying Lotus	3:03
6.	"All the Secrets"	Ellison	Flying Lotus	1:56
7.	"Sultan's Request"	Ellison	Flying Lotus	1:42
8.	"Putty Boy Strut"	Ellison	Flying Lotus	2:53
9.	"See Thru to U" (featuring Erykah Badu)	Ellison, Erica Wright	Flying Lotus	2:24
10.	"Until the Quiet Comes"	Ellison	Flying Lotus	2:11
11.	"DMT Song" (featuring Thundercat)	Stephen Bruner, Austin Peralta, Ellison	Flying Lotus	1:19
12.	"The Nightcaller"	Sam Baker, Ellison	Flying Lotus	3:29
13.	"Only If You Wanna"	Bruner, Ellison	Flying Lotus	1:42
14.	"Electric Candyman" (featuring Thom Yorke)	Ellison, Thomas Yorke	Flying Lotus	3:32
15.	"Hunger" (featuring Niki Randa)	Ellison, Jonathan Greenwood, Randa	Amanda Ramirez (add.), Andres Renteria (add.), Flying Lotus, Rebekah Raff (add.)	3:39
16.	"Phantasm" (featuring Laura Darlington)	Laura Darlington, Ellison	Flying Lotus	3:51
17.	"me Yesterday//Corded"	Ellison	Flying Lotus	4:39
18.	"Dream to Me"	Ellison	Flying Lotus	1:36
19.	"The Things You Left" (Japanese bonus track)	Ellison	Flying Lotus	2:49
Total length:				46:42

Notes

- (add.) denotes additional production.
- "Hunger" incorporates elements from "Guitar 12" by Jonny Greenwood.

== Personnel ==
Credits are adapted from the album's liner notes.

- Sam Baker – composer
- Brandon Coleman – keyboards
- Gene Coye – drums
- Daddy Kev – mastering
- Laura Darlington – composer, vocals
- Dorian Concept – keyboards
- Erykah Badu – composer, vocals
- Miguel Atwood Ferguson – strings
- Flying Lotus – composer, producer
- Jonny Greenwood – composer
- The Integration Players – strings
- Dan Kitchens – photography
- Austin Peralta – composer, keyboards
- Niki Randa – composer, vocals
- Stephen Serrato – art direction, design
- Thundercat – bass guitar, composer, vocals
- Thom Yorke – composer, vocals

== Charts ==
Chart (2012)	Peak position
Belgian Albums Chart (Flanders)	26
Belgian Albums Chart (Wallonia)	142
Dutch Albums Chart	72
German Albums Chart	83
Irish Albums Chart	50
Italian Albums Chart	89
Japanese Albums Chart	41
Swiss Albums Chart	99
UK Albums Chart	34
US Billboard 200	34
US Independent Albums	7
US Top Dance/Electronic Albums	2

== Release history ==
Region	Date	Label
Japan	September 26, 2012	Warp Records
Netherlands	September 27, 2012	Warp Records
Australia	September 28, 2012	Warp Records
Germany	September 28, 2012	Warp Records
Ireland	September 28, 2012	Warp Records
United Kingdom	October 1, 2012	Warp, PIAS Recordings
Canada	October 2, 2012	Warp
United States	October 2, 2012	Warp
Sweden	October 3, 2012	Warp

== See also ==
- Dream art
