= Theo Ellsworth =

American self-taught artist and comic creator

Theo Ellsworth is a self-taught artist and comics creator best known for his graphic novels Capacity and Sleeper Car. In 2010, he was a recipient of the Best Art Vinyl award for the Flying Lotus EP Pattern+Grid World. He lives with his wife and son in Missoula, Montana.

== Biography ==
Theo Ellsworth was born in Los Angeles, California where he lived until he was six when his family relocated to Missoula, Montana. His father worked in hospice and his mother worked for a company that provided services for people with mental disabilities. Ellsworth has an older brother and a younger sister. He notes having difficulty paying attention in school, oftentimes daydreaming during lessons. Ellsworth dropped out of high school and received his GED. Ellsworth travelled around the United States, living out of his car, occasionally returning to Missoula. He used this period as a time of introspection and to figure out how to make art and comics the central focus of his work. He sold his car and used that money, in addition to working odd jobs, while he wrote the first six issues of Capacity.

While Ellsworth tried some formal art classes, he found the instruction counterproductive to his own artistic style and vision. He is instead self-taught. Ellsworth notes Henry Darger, Adolf Wölfli, and Martin Ramirez as artistic influences.

== Career ==
Ellsworth's first book Capacity was published in 2008 by Secret Acres. It is a compilation of mini-comics he produced between 2005 and 2007. Ellsworth also created an additional 100 pages of material specifically to tie all the stories together for the book's publication. In 2013, Ellsworth published Capacity #8, a new issue that continues his Capacity series.

In 2009, Secret Acres published Ellsworth's Sleeper Car, a 32-page comic. A selection from Sleeper Car, Norman Eight's Right Arm was chosen by Neil Gaiman for The Best American Comics 2010.

Book One of his The Understanding Monster trilogy came out in 2012 and won the 2013 Lynd Ward Honor Book prize given out by Penn State. Excerpts from "The Understanding Monster Vol. 1" were selected by Scott McCloud to be included in the "Best American Comics 2014." Volume Two of the Understanding Monster was released in the fall of 2014, and Volume Three was released in the fall of 2015.

In 2021, Ellsworth created a comics adaptation of a short story by Jeff Vandermeer, which was published by Drawn & Quarterly.

His work has been described as "a cross between cartooning and art, poetry and the nonsensical ramblings of a writer emerging from a dream."

== Anthology credits and references ==
Ellsworth is credited as the artist for "A History of Nonviolence" which appeared in 2013 in issue 3 of the political comics anthology, "Occupy Comics." Ellsworth is also credited as a contributor to the comic anthology "Little Nemo: Dream Another Dream", which features contemporary artists' homages to Windsor McCay's oversized Sunday newspaper comics of the early 20th century.

Fred Johnson utilizes Ellsworth's artwork in "Perspicuous Objects," a series of articles that explores comics in-depth by combining the lenses of visual rhetoricians with cartoonists and comic theorists.

Ellsworth contributed a 10-page comic titled Hyper Curious to the anthology "Alive Outside", edited by Cullen Beckhorn and Marc Bell, published by Neoglyphic Media in 2024.

== Published works ==
- Ellsworth, Theo. Sleeper Car, Secret Acres, 2009. ISBN 978-0-9799609-6-3
- Ellsworth, Theo. Capacity, Secret Acres, 2010. ISBN 978-0-9799609-2-5
- Ellsworth, Theo. The Understanding Monster, Secret Acres, 2012. ISBN 978-0-9831662-4-5

== Sources ==
- Sienkiewicz, Bill; Pope, Paul; Mack, David; Powell, Nate; Thompson, Craig; Allred, Michael; Ellsworth, Theo; Dalrymple, Farel (2014). Little Nemo: Dream Another Dream (1st ed.). Locust Moon Press. p. 144. ISBN 0989907694.
- Pizzolo, Matt. "Occupy Comics Issue Three", Black Mask Studios, 2012.
