= Already =

Already may refer to:

== Albums ==
- Already (Jesus Jones album), 1997
- Already (Edison Lighthouse album), 1971

== Songs ==
- "Already" (song), 2019 song by Beyoncé, Shatta Wale and Major Lazer
- "Already", 2009 song by Mannie Fresh on his album Return of the Ballin'
- "Already", 2011 song by Freddie Gibbs on his album Lord Giveth, Lord Taketh Away
- "Already", 2011 song by Samiyam on his album Sam Baker's Album
- "Already", 2013 song by Gucci Mane on his mixtape Trap House 4
- "Already", 2014 song by Anderson Paak on his album Venice
- "Already", 2014 song by Chief Keef on his album Nobody
- "Already", 2022 song by (G)I-dle on their album I Never Die
