= The Long Lost (album) =

Studio album by The Long Lost
- Released: March 2, 2009
- Genre: Electroacoustic, psychedelic
- Length: 44:28
- Label: Ninja Tune
- Producer: Alfred Darlington, Laura Darlington

Singles from The Long Lost
- 1. "Woebegone" Released: 2008; 2. "Amiss" Released: 2009

Professional ratings
Review scores
Source	Rating
AllMusic	3.5/5 stars
Cokemachineglow	mixed
XLR8R	7/10

The Long Lost is the debut studio album by American electronic musician Daedelus and their wife Laura Darlington under the name The Long Lost. It was released on Ninja Tune in 2009.

== Critical reception ==
Tim Sendra of AllMusic gave the album 3.5 stars out of 5, saying: "It may not work for everyone, especially someone looking for the visceral thrills of a Daedelus record, but if you are captured, you will end up captivated by The Long Lost." August Howard of XLR8R gave the album a 7 out of 10, saying: "While The Long Lost may not be a groundbreaking effort, it's unquestionably a pleasant listen." David Abravanel of Cokemachineglow said: "Inevitably, boredom, cynicism, and even jealousy may arise as issues here, but it's hard not to be momentarily entranced by something so loving and so strange."

== Track listing ==
No.	Title	Length
1.	"The Art of Kissing"	2:53
2.	"Amiss"	2:58
3.	"Sibilance"	3:18
4.	"Overmuch"	3:17
5.	"Past Perfect"	5:15
6.	"Ballroom Dance Club"	2:39
7.	"Siren Song"	3:00
8.	"Colour"	3:48
9.	"Regrets Only"	3:52
10.	"Cat Fancy"	2:36
11.	"Woebegone"	2:29
12.	"Finders Keepers"	3:44
13.	"Domestics"	2:30
14.	"Awash"	2:18

== Personnel ==
Credits adapted from liner notes.

- Alfred Darlington – vocals, guitar, bass guitar, clarinet, melodica, keyboards, drum programming, writing, production
- Laura Darlington – vocals, flute, toy piano, kalimba, omnichord, writing, production, artwork
- Dexter Story – drums
- Christina Rossetti – lyrics (8)
- Andres Renteria – percussion (10)
- Ben Wendel – bassoon (12)
- Pete Curry – recording
- Matt Pzonak – recording
- Andrew Turner – recording
- Thom Monahan – mixing
- JJ Golden – mastering
