= Cosmogramma =

2010 album by Flying Lotus

Studio album by Flying Lotus
- Released: May 3, 2010
- Recorded: October 2008–2009
- Studio: Los Angeles
- Genres: Electronica; psychedelic hip-hop; instrumental hip-hop; wonky; IDM; nu jazz; glitch hop; electro swing
- Length: 45:36
- Label: Warp
- Producer: Flying Lotus

Flying Lotus chronology
Los Angeles (2008)	Cosmogramma (2010)	Pattern+Grid World (2010)

Cosmogramma is the third studio album by American music producer Steven Ellison as Flying Lotus, released by Warp Records on May 3, 2010. Recording sessions began in October 2008 in Ellison's apartment in Los Angeles, immediately following his previous album and the death of his mother. Ellison used a laptop, a sampler and a drum machine, along with live instruments. The album draws conceptually on lucid dreaming and out-of-body experiences, with contributions from Laura Darlington, Miguel Atwood-Ferguson, Niki Randa, Thom Yorke, Ravi Coltrane, Rebekah Raff and Thundercat.

Cosmogramma is an eclectic electronica, experimental, IDM and nu jazz record, with influences spanning numerous genres, including psychedelic hip-hop and glitch. Its songs were described by journalists as multi-layered, dense, varied and with extensive production techniques, incorporating a maximalist and Afrofuturist style.

Cosmogramma was promoted with a free "augmented reality" application called Cosmogramma Fieldlines. Though Ellison released no singles, he went on a tour through Canada, Europe, and United States in promotion of the album. The album entered and peaked at number 60 on the UK Albums Chart, and at number 88 on the US Billboard 200 chart. Upon release, the album received widespread critical acclaim, and was placed on numerous year-end lists. In 2011, Ellison released a compilation of B-sides, Cosmogramma Alt Takes. At the turn of the decade, several publications listed Cosmogramma among the greatest albums of the 2010s.

== Background ==
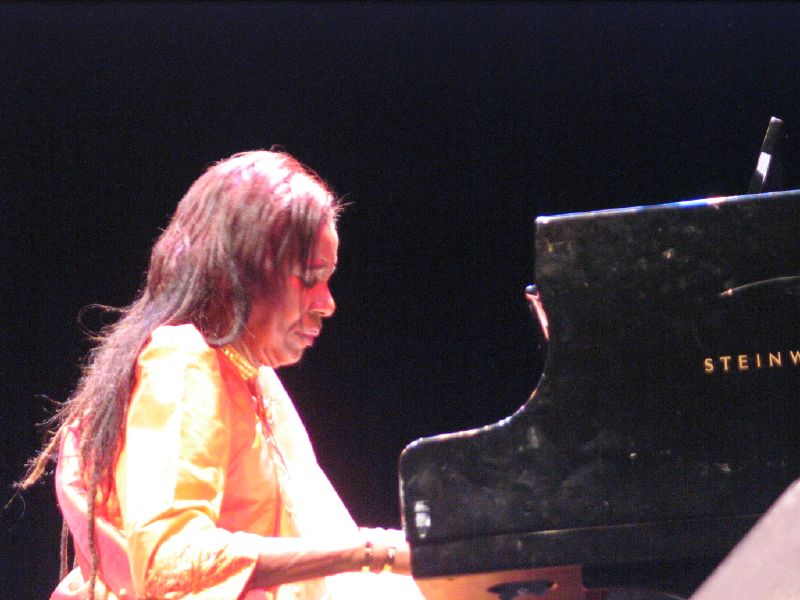
Alice Coltrane, Ellison's great-aunt, who inspired the title of the album (pictured in 2006).

On October 31, 2008, Ellison's mother died of complications from diabetes, 21 months after his great-aunt Alice Coltrane's death. Ellison said, "I decided that if I was going to speak after that experience [the death of his mother], it better be something honest, and deeper than a record that was just made for the times. I wanted to do something that made her proud."

The title is an obstruction of "cosmic drama". Ellison said:

My aunt had an ashram in Agoura full of devotees... And I was listening to one of her recorded discourses talking about how once this earthly experience is over, we won't be wearing our costumes anymore, playing parts in this "cosmic drama", she called it. But I thought she said "cosmogramma". That word haunted me for a long time until I found out it actually exists. It refers to the study of the universe, and heaven and hell as well.

== Recording and production ==
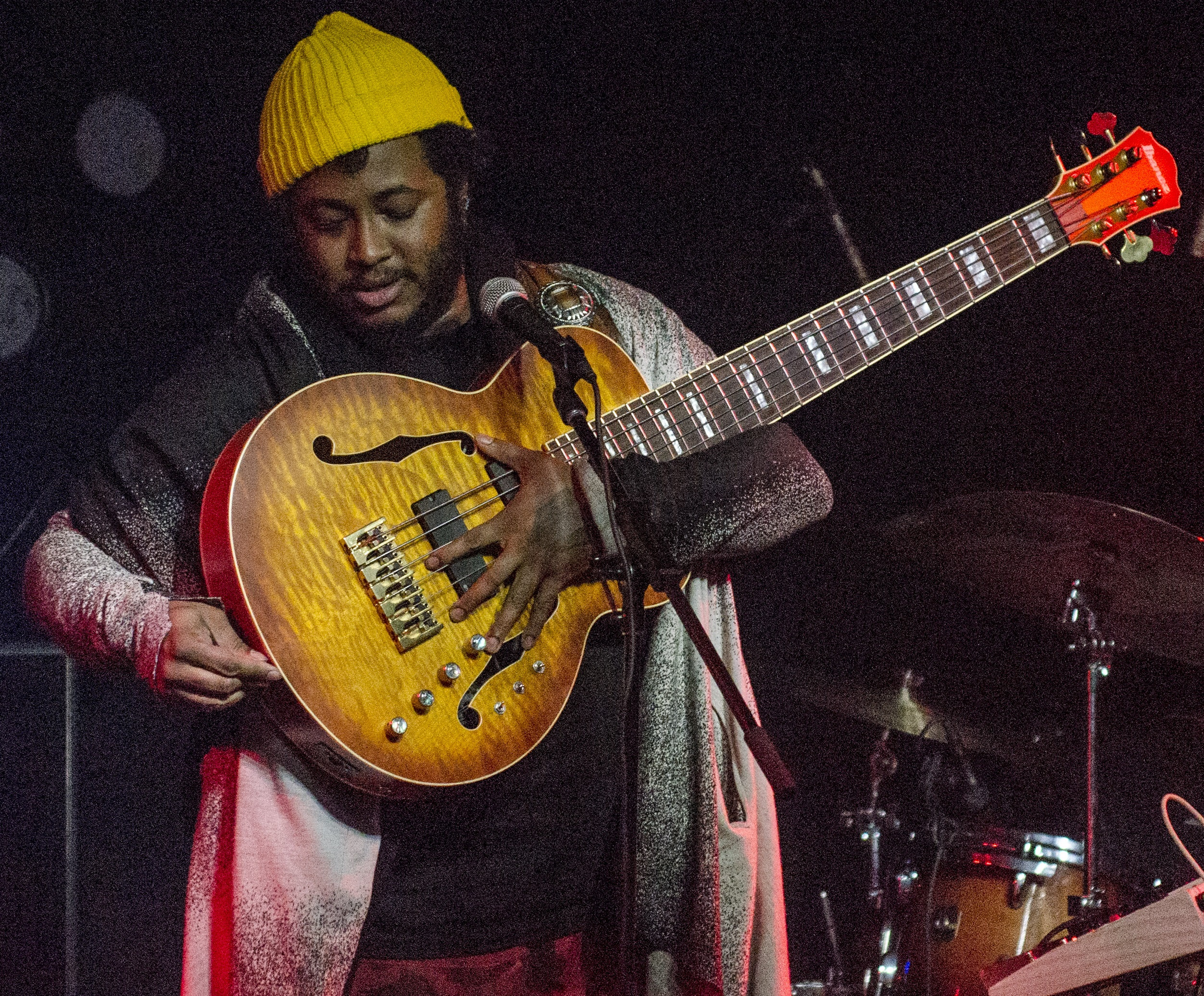
Thundercat, who played bass for various tracks and contributed with vocals (pictured in 2015).

The recording sessions began in October 2008, immediately following his sophomore album Los Angeles, and while grieving his mother's death. Following a session for the track "Computer Face", he had found the energy and theme for Cosmogramma. The album was fully recorded in Ellison's apartment in Los Angeles, California. During the album's recording, Ellison developed a creative relationship with Thundercat, a member of his Brainfeeder record label. The artwork is an excerpt of Codex Tor, a series of books of compiled illustrations by Leigh McCloskey, Ellison's art mentor. It features "lots of circles and intricate lines, matching Flying Lotus' throbbing, more-is-more music". Warp also released other versions of the cover art.

The album features Ravi Coltrane, Miguel Atwood-Ferguson, Thundercat and Rebekah Raff, who later formed the live band Infinity. It also features guest vocals by Laura Darlington, Niki Randa and Thom Yorke of Radiohead. For the track "...And the World Laughs with You", Ellison was put in contact with Yorke by Mary Anne Hobbs, and they started conversing the same day. After trading a series of emails, he received Yorke's vocals by email. The track was titled before Yorke had written lyrics. Yorke kept the original title, which Ellison appreciated, saying: "He also kept the same name I had for it, which really meant a lot to me. All of the song titles mean something, and that one does for sure."

While his mother was in the hospital, Ellison brought in a mobile recording rig and set microphones around her room to gather audio samples, such as a respirator and vital-sign monitors. The samples were also used in the closing track "Galaxy in Janaki", a tribute to his mother. On the process of recording his mother's respirator, Ellison said: "I know it was a weird thing to do. I'm not the type to go out recording things like that. But I didn't want to forget that space." When asked where the title came from, he said: "that's the term my aunt gave my mother. It means mother as well." (The 1972 Alice Coltrane album World Galaxy features tracks titled "Galaxy in Turiya" (referring to Coltrane's adopted Sanskrit name, Turiyasangitananda or Turiya) and "Galaxy in Satchidananda" (referring to the guru Satchidananda Saraswati, from whom Coltrane sought spiritual guidance).) He also used other samples, such as video game sounds.

Ellison said the process of recording was "quite DIY". He also said the mixing was "the hard part", but a "cathartic" and "fun" process. Daddy Kev, of Low End Theory and Alpha Pup Records, handled mastering, which was overseen by Ellison. Daddy Kev said that it lasted four months, when it usually takes a few days.

== Composition ==
"Mmmhmm"
"Mmmhmm" features Thundercat's vocals and Ellison's experimental electronic production.

"Galaxy in Janaki"
The last song of the album, dedicated to Ellison's mother, with rimshots, strings, horn stabs and rapid bass scales.

Compared to earlier releases, which were primarily based on electronic and digital mediums, Cosmogramma marks a change for Flying Lotus. He started to use live performances, including harp, bass, strings, live drums, saxophone, keyboard and trumpet. However, he also used a laptop, a sampler and a drum machine to produce and to manipulate samples.

Cosmogramma is described as electronica, experimental, experimental hip-hop, nu jazz, psychedelic hip-hop and IDM. The album includes elements of ambient, chiptune, digital glitch, dubstep, drum and bass, free jazz, house, P-Funk, soul and techno.

The album is considered to have a dense, Afrofuturist and maximalist style. It is multi-layered and subtly orchestral, with variations in depth and timbre, and production techniques such as ducking, pumping, real inputting and tempo misalignment. The album drew comparisons with DJ Shadow's Endtroducing.

Cosmogramma was conceived by Ellison as a "map of the universe" and a "space opera", fusing 20th- and 21st- century music. It was inspired by lucid dreaming, out-of-body experiences and daydreams, as well as psychoactive drugs like mescaline and DMT. The first two themes were also featured on his next album, Until the Quiet Comes.

=== Tracks ===
"Clock Catcher" has fast, "fierce, off-kilter" hi-hats. "Pickled!" was described as a "basstronica odyssey". "Nose Art" combines "raygun squiggles" and "grinding mechanical noises", with "woozy", "symphonic" synths. "Intro//A Cosmic Drama" has "cinematic depth". "Zodiac Shit" has a "heavy, loping" bass thump, vintage synths, syncopated drum solos, and "spooky" strings. "Computer Face//Pure Being" is a "track of almost heavy metal proportions". "...And the World Laughs with You" is a glitchy song, with Yorke's vocals chopped and resampled. "Arkestry" is a jazz composition, which was compared to Sun Ra.

"Mmmhmm" has a main melody with "a breezy tropical air" and a "machine-like" beat. Its outro contains a transition to "Do the Astral Plane", a "Theo Parrish–styled" house song which features "spaced-out" scat singing from Thundercat. The distorted vocal samples and arrangement of "Satelllliiiiiiite" were compared to Burial; the song leads to "German Haircut", which features a "jazzy octave" bass and "sax 'n' drums noodling". "Recoiled" was described as a collision of "Whinnying Baltimore, helium-vocalled UK hardcore and harp". "Dance of the Pseudo Nymph" is a "funky" dubstep song. The "percolating" strings of "Drips//Auntie's Harp" lead into "Table Tennis", which contains Laura Darlington's "breathy", "Astrud Gilberto-esque" vocals. The last track, "Galaxy in Janaki", has horn stabs, strings, "stuttering" rimshots and "rapid-fire" bass scales.

== Promotion and release ==
Screenshot of the application Cosmogramma Fieldlines.

Cosmogramma was advertised through an application called Cosmogramma Fieldlines, an augmented reality app released free of charge. This app was controlled using a webcam or a mouse, and was developed by Aaron Meyers and Warp. The application was built on openFrameworks.

In February 2010, Ellison started a tour through Canada, Europe and the United States. The album release party was held on May 14, 2010, over two nights at The Echoplex, in Los Angeles. The show had opening performances from Infinity, Low End resident DJ The Gaslamp Killer, Gonjasufi, and sound artist Matthewdavid.

The album was released on May 3, 2010, through Warp Records. Limited pressings with a golden slipcase were also released. On April 16, 2011, Ellison released the album's B-side EP, Cosmogramma Alt Takes.

== Reception ==
Professional ratings
Aggregate scores
Source	Rating
AnyDecentMusic?	8.3/10
Metacritic	86/100
Review scores
Source	Rating
AllMusic	5/5 stars
The A.V. Club	A
The Guardian	4/5 stars
The Irish Times	4/5 stars
MSN Music (Expert Witness)	A−
NME	8/10
Pitchfork	8.8/10
Rolling Stone	3/5 stars
Spin	8/10
The Times	5/5 stars

At Metacritic, which assigns a normalized rating out of 100 to reviews from mainstream publications, Cosmogramma received an average score of 86, indicating "universal acclaim", based on 26 reviews. Chris Martins of The A.V. Club praised the album as "one of the most musical and inventive to fly the electronica banner in years," and a "hybridized work that challenges others to follow its dazzling blueprint". Robert Christgau, writing for MSN Music, wrote that "part of its delight is how naturally the disparate parts fit together, but another part is how they add up to phantasmagoria if you let your attention wander (and don't be a tight-ass—you should)". William Rauscher of Resident Advisor noted that the album's "sheer amount of diversity" makes it a "much more challenging affair" than its predecessor, Los Angeles.

Simon Reynolds cited Cosmogramma as an example of what he describes as a "hyper-eclectic approach" to production that can be "rich and potent on some levels, but ultimately fatiguing and bewildering for most listeners", further characterizing the album as "hip-hop jazz for the ADHD generation". In a mixed to positive review, Jon Dolan of Rolling Stone wrote: "There's some info overload, but Ellison is an ace with pacing, and a distracted soulfulness guides the frantic laptop science."

=== Commercial performance ===
Cosmogramma sold 12,000 copies in its first two weeks of release. In January 2011, it had sold 33,574 copies. Commercially, the album peaked at number 88 on the US Billboard 200 and number three on the US Top Dance Albums chart, both on the week of May 22, 2010. While Cosmogramma remained on the former chart for two weeks, it was much successful on the Top Dance Albums chart, remaining there for fifteen weeks. In addition, the album peaked at number 60 on the UK Albums chart on the week of May 5, 2010.

=== Accolades ===
Cosmogramma appeared in numerous year-end lists. According to Metacritic, Cosmogramma was the 13th most acclaimed album of the year, and the "year's best-reviewed electronica album".

Cosmogramma was awarded the top spot in Exclaim! magazine's annual ranking of electronic albums, with Exclaim!'s Dimitri Nasrallah writing of Ellison: "In the five years since he first appeared on the scene, the Los Angeles native's talents have grown in such leaps and bounds that he now finds himself pioneering a full-blown West-Coast beats renaissance." It was later ranked the fourteenth best album of 2010 by Pitchfork, and named the best album of the year at British radio DJ Gilles Peterson's 2011 Worldwide Winners awards ceremony. In 2019, Cosmogramma was also listed among the greatest albums of the 2010s decade by The A.V. Club (33), Consequence (48), Pitchfork (68) and Uproxx (61).

Publication	Accolade (2010)	Rank
The A.V. Club	The Best Music of 2010	22
AllMusic	Favorite Albums of 2010	*
Consequence of Sound	The Top 100 Albums of 2010	8
Exclaim!	Top Electronic Albums of the Year	1
NME	75 Best Albums of 2010	61
Paste	The 50 Best Albums of 2010	49
Pitchfork	The Top 50 Albums of 2010	14
PopMatters	The 70 Best Albums of 2010	3
Stereogum	Top 50 Albums of 2010	19
Uncut	The 50 Best Albums of 2010	30
The Wire	The 50 Best Albums of 2010	25
"*" denotes an unordered list.

== Track listing ==
All music is composed by Steven Ellison, except where noted.

Standard edition
No.	Title	Writer(s)	Length
1.	"Clock Catcher"		1:12
2.	"Pickled!"		2:13
3.	"Nose Art"		1:58
4.	"Intro//A Cosmic Drama"		1:14
5.	"Zodiac Shit"		2:44
6.	"Computer Face//Pure Being"		2:32
7.	"...And the World Laughs with You" (featuring Thom Yorke)	Steven Ellison; Thom Yorke	2:55
8.	"Arkestry"		2:51
9.	"MmmHmm" (featuring Thundercat)	Stephen Bruner	4:14
10.	"Do the Astral Plane"		3:57
11.	"Satelllliiiiiiiteee"		3:49
12.	"German Haircut"		1:57
13.	"Recoiled"		3:36
14.	"Dance of the Pseudo Nymph"		2:46
15.	"Drips//Auntie's Harp"		2:10
16.	"Table Tennis" (featuring Laura Darlington)	Ellison; Laura Darlington	3:01
17.	"Galaxy in Janaki"		2:27
Total length:			45:36

Japanese edition bonus track
No.	Title	Writer(s)	Length
18.	"Velvet Cake"	Ellison	2:40
Total length:			48:16

== Personnel ==
Credits adapted from digital booklet.

=== Musicians ===
- Brian Martinez – guitar (track 16)
- Dorian Concept – keyboard (track 11)
- Laura Darlington – vocals (track 16)
- Low Leaf – keyboard (track 14)
- Miguel Atwood-Ferguson – strings and string arrangements (tracks 4, 5, 10, 15, 17)
- Niki Randa – vocals (track 4)
- Ravi Coltrane – tenor saxophone (tracks 8, 12)
- Rebekah Raff – harp (tracks 1, 4, 5, 8, 12, 13, 15, 17)
- Richard Eigner – drums (track 12)
- Thom Yorke – vocals (track 7)
- Thundercat – bass (tracks 2, 4, 5, 7, 9, 11, 14, 17), vocals (tracks 9, 10, 14)
- Todd Simon – trumpet (track 10)

=== Technical personnel ===
- Flying Lotus – production, engineering
- Daddy Kev – mastering
- Leigh J. McCloskey – artwork
- Brandy Flower – design

== Charts ==
Chart (2010)	Peak position
UK Albums (Official Charts)	60
US Billboard 200	88
US Top Dance Albums (Billboard)	3

== See also ==
- 2010 in music

== Bibliography ==
- Hodgson, Jay (2010). Understanding Records: A Field Guide To Recording Practice. Bloomsbury Publishing. ISBN 978-1-44116-566-4.
