= 1983 (Flying Lotus album) =

Studio album by Flying Lotus
- Released: October 3, 2006
- Genre: Instrumental hip-hop
- Length: 33:53
- Label: Plug Research
- Producer: Flying Lotus

Flying Lotus chronology
July Heat (2005)	1983 (2006)	Reset (2007)

1983 is the debut studio album by American electronic music producer Steven Ellison, under his moniker Flying Lotus. It was released by Plug Research on October 3, 2006. The album is named after Ellison's year of birth. The 20th anniversary edition was re-released on vinyl for Record Store Day on April 17th, 2026.

== Critical reception ==
Professional ratings
Review scores
Source	Rating
AllMusic	3.5/5 stars
Cokemachineglow	favorable
Dusted Magazine	favorable
Pitchfork	5.8/10
XLR8R	favorable

Marisa Brown of AllMusic gave the album 3.5 stars out of 5, writing, "It's controlled and circular but also very warm and expressive, able to have fun, to not take itself too seriously." Chet Betz of Cokemachineglow commented that "1983 isn't very obvious about envelope-pushing, yet it's rare that an instrumental hip-hop album can remain eminently listenable while standing so firm in character and purpose, ontological towards its subgenre without forgetting to funk, simultaneously without milking the funk for its more shameless immediacies." Dave Segal of XLR8R called the album "a rare species of cosmic underground hip-hop". He added, "Flying Lotus combines Madlib's affinity for jazzy arrangements and chord progressions, Nobody's and Daedelus' psychedelic textural proclivities, and J Dilla's economical, dusted funkiness." Meanwhile, Brian Howe of Pitchfork gave the album a 5.8 out of 10, stating, "like an overly workshopped novel, the album is stylish, well-turned, and interchangeable with its peers".

In 2017, Ammar Kalia of Clash wrote, "Composed using a patchwork of influences ranging from jazz harp to Japanese synthpop, Afro-Cuban rhythm and distorted game sounds, it serves as a mission statement, setting the tone for Ellison's future works."

== Track listing ==
No.	Title	Length
1.	"1983"	5:10
2.	"São Paulo"	2:08
3.	"Bad Actors"	1:28
4.	"Orbit Brazil"	2:40
5.	"Shifty"	1:28
6.	"Babble"	0:53
7.	"Pet Monster Shotglass"	6:39
8.	"Hello"	2:48
9.	"Untitled #7"	3:22
10.	"Unexpected Delight" (featuring Laura Darlington)	3:22
11.	"1983" (Daedelus's Odd-Dance Party Remix [bonus track])	3:55
Total length:		33:53

== Personnel ==
Credits adapted from liner notes.

- Flying Lotus – music
- Laura Darlington – vocals (10)
- Daedelus – remix (11)
- Kelly Hibbert – mastering
- Brandy Flower – artwork

== Charts ==
Chart performance for 1983
Chart (2026)	Peak position
UK R&B Albums (Official Charts)	5
