= Ash (2025 film) =

Film by Flying Lotus

- Theatrical release poster
- Directed by: Flying Lotus
- Written by: Jonni Remmler
- Produced by: Matthew Metcalfe; Nate Bolotin
- Starring: Eiza González; Aaron Paul; Iko Uwais; Kate Elliott; Beulah Koale; Flying Lotus
- Cinematography: Richard Bluck
- Edited by: Bryan Shaw
- Music by: Flying Lotus
- Production companies: XYZ Films; GFC Films; Brainfeeder Films
- Distributed by: RLJE Films; Shudder (United States); Amazon MGM Studios (International)
- Release dates: March 11, 2025 (SXSW); March 21, 2025 (United States)
- Running time: 95 minutes
- Country: United States
- Language: English
- Box office: $1.1 million

Ash is a 2025 American science fiction horror film written by Jonni Remmler, and directed and scored by Flying Lotus. It stars Eiza González, Aaron Paul, Iko Uwais, Kate Elliott, Beulah Koale, and Lotus. Its plot deals with an astronaut who awakens aboard a station on a strange planet with all her crew killed. Subject to amnesia and paranoia, she cannot determine whether to trust a man who claims he knows her and was sent to rescue her.

Ash had its world premiere at the SXSW on March 11, 2025, and was released on March 21, 2025. The film has grossed $1.1 million and received generally positive reviews from critics, with praise aimed towards the performances, atmosphere, and visuals, as well as Lotus's direction and score.

== Plot ==
Riya wakes up aboard a scientific research station on a distant, barren planet with no recollection of how she got there. While exploring the station, she suffers nightmarish flashbacks and finds several corpses. She encounters a man named Brion, who claims to be a companion responding to her distress call. An investigation reveals that Riya, Brion, and the deceased crew—command officer Adhi, Riya's boyfriend Kevin, Clarke, and Davis—were part of several expeditions to discover new habitable planets. The planet they are currently on, designated K.O.I-442 (nicknamed "Ash"), is Earth's last hope for success. While the crew inhabited the planetside station, Brion stayed on a second station in orbit to maintain contact with Earth and monitor the crew's progress.

Riya and Brion fail to find Clarke, the only crew member whose corpse was not among the dead, and make preparations to leave the planet. Riya begins to experience more flashbacks of murdering the crew. During a meteor storm, the station's systems register a hull breach. While working to seal the breach, Riya finds signs of someone having been inside the maintenance shafts. She suspects that Clarke is still alive and was infected by something unknown, which caused her to become psychotic and made her responsible for the crew's death and the station's sabotage.

Due to the station's oxygen supply rapidly depleting, Riya and Brion must leave on the first line-up with the orbital station. In a drone's memory bank, Riya finds recordings of an EVA investigation after Brion discovered strange emissions from multiple points on the planet, yielding the discovery of atmospheric converters of alien origin. Brion tells her that when Davis dropped a rock into the converter's shaft, the device suddenly activated, propelling the rock back up and killing him. Riya and Brion have an argument where he refuses to stay, insisting that the revelation of advanced alien life comes before finding out what happened.

Brion and Riya prepare for evacuation when she suddenly has a flashback of Adhi aggressively attacking her, forcing her to kill him. After recovering, she encounters Clarke, who flees into the maintenance tunnels. Riya follows and finds Brion's corpse. Clarke attacks her, and Riya retreats into the station's bathroom, where she plugs a shower hose into Clarke's helmet and drowns her. Upon scanning Clarke's body, Riya finds no trace of infection. She is forced to return to the lander but finds it sabotaged. She returns to the station and scans Brion's body, discovering that he had died before she met him.

Riya realizes that she is the one infected, and she hallucinated Brion due to a nanotechnological parasite residing in her. It is revealed that Kevin inadvertently brought an alien invertebrate that disrupted contact with orbital and forced Brion to come down. Adhi and the others argued for immediate evacuation, but Riya insisted on staying to investigate and recover the terraforming technology. While researching the alien, a parasite broke out and infected Adhi, causing him to attack the crew. After killing Adhi, Kevin became infected and kills Brion. Then, Riya killed Kevin, and the parasite infected her. Seeking to kill herself before it could fully take hold of her, Riya ingested potassium cyanide from the station's sick bay, but survived when the parasite neutralized the toxin.

The parasite informs Riya that its race has already claimed this planet. Believing the human race to be an inefficient life form, it has chosen to merge with and evolve her. Riya extracts the parasite, but it infests and revives Brion. She kills it with a welding torch and restores the lander, taking off toward the orbital facility. As she nears it, it's revealed that the facility has been overtaken by a large parasitic entity.

== Cast ==
- Eiza González as Riya Ortiz
- Aaron Paul as Brion Cargyle
- Iko Uwais as Adhi
- Beulah Koale as Kevin
- Kate Elliott as Catherine Clarke
- Flying Lotus as Shawn Davis

== Production ==
In August 2022, it was announced that Joseph Gordon-Levitt and Tessa Thompson were cast in the film. In March 2023, it was announced that Aaron Paul and Eiza González were cast to replace Gordon-Levitt and Thompson respectively. In May 2023, it was announced that Uwais, Koale, Elliott and Flying Lotus were cast in the film and that production had begun.

Flying Lotus learned how to make computer-generated imagery effects from YouTube videos. Filming was done inside a former door manufacturing plant in New Zealand using an Arri Alexa 35 camera. The film was edited using Media Composer. Miniatures for the film were created by Adam Makarenko.

The ending fight scene was inspired by Resident Evil. Terrence Malick, Ryuichi Sakamoto, and John Carpenter were given special thanks in the credits. Flying Lotus stated that the soundtrack was inspired by the work of Carpenter.

== Release ==
Ash was released theatrically in the United States on March 21, 2025, by RLJE Films and Shudder. In February 2024, Amazon MGM Studios acquired international distribution rights to the film at the European Film Market for around $10 million, releasing on their Prime Video streaming service.

== Reception ==
=== Box office ===
In the United States, Ash was released alongside The Alto Knights and Snow White, and was projected to gross around $2 million from 1,136 theaters in its opening weekend. It did not meet those projections, instead grossing $689,144 in its first three days.

=== Critical response ===
On the review aggregator website Rotten Tomatoes, 71% of 92 critics' reviews are positive, with an average rating of 5.9/10. The website's consensus reads: "Flying Lotus' Ash delivers the phantasmagorical goods with vivid visuals and a throbbing soundscape, elevating a predictable sci-fi story into a memorably stylish head-trip." Metacritic, which uses a weighted average, assigned the film a score of 63 out of 100, based on 16 critics, indicating "generally favorable" reviews.

Katie Rife of IndieWire graded the film a B− and wrote, "Like Brandon Cronenberg's Possessor, Ash makes extensive use of cut-ins that violently tear through the frame, jarring the audience with nightmarish imagery that's disarming under normal circumstances and probably soul-searingly terrifying if one's third eye happens to be open at the time. Think rage monsters — coated in blood that's as thick as crude oil — who scream under red lights as the score spikes in the background. It's very much a horror movie, and a freaky one at times."

Zachary Lee of RogerEbert.com gave the film three stars out of four, writing, "Ash may not reinvent the sci-fi horror genre, but Flying Lotus knows when to subvert tropes and when to lean into them. When it's all executed with as controlled a precision as we see here, it's nothing less than thrilling. It's a B-movie operating at the highest levels of craftsmanship, intrigue, and performance."

== See also ==
- Friend of the World, a 2020 film with a similar premise
- Space horror

== Works cited ==
- Bramesco, Charles (2025). "Deadly Outpost". Filmmaker. Vol. 33, no. 3. The Gotham Film & Media Institute.
