= Sam Baker's Album =

Studio album by Samiyam
- Released: June 28, 2011
- Genre: Instrumental hip hop
- Length: 39:45
- Label: Brainfeeder
- Producer: Samiyam

Samiyam chronology
Rap Beats Vol. 1 (2008)	Sam Baker's Album (2011)	Wish You Were Here (2013)

Sam Baker's Album is a studio album by American hip hop producer Samiyam. It was released through Brainfeeder on June 28, 2011.

== Critical reception ==
Professional ratings
Aggregate scores
Source	Rating
Metacritic	68/100
Review scores
Source	Rating
BBC	favorable
Beats Per Minute	73%
Fact	3.5/5 stars
NME	6/10
Pitchfork	6.3/10
Resident Advisor	3.5/5
The Skinny	4/5 stars
XLR8R	6/10

At Metacritic, which assigns a weighted average score out of 100 to reviews from mainstream critics, the album received an average score of 68, based on 9 reviews, indicating "generally favorable reviews".

Sam Wiseman of The Skinny gave the album 4 out of 5 stars, commenting that "Sam Baker's Album works within a fairly narrow set of methodological constraints, but within those, it demonstrates impressive ingenuity." Laurent Fintoni of Fact described it as "the best possible showcase of Samiyam's incredible talent when it comes to swung, synth-heavy music production." Glenn Jackson of XLR8R wrote, "All in all, most every cut on Sam Baker's Album is solid in its own right, but maybe 40 minutes is just too much, considering that the lines which box in the instrumental hip-hop genre become only more clear as the album pushes on."

== Track listing ==
No.	Title	Length
1.	"Escape"	3:45
2.	"Bedtime"	1:21
3.	"Pressure"	2:11
4.	"Bricks"	1:41
5.	"Already"	1:44
6.	"Frosting Packets"	3:45
7.	"Kitties"	1:14
8.	"Where Am I"	2:39
9.	"Cushion"	2:22
10.	"Turtles"	1:27
11.	"My Buddy"	3:09
12.	"No Dinner"	1:30
13.	"Understanding"	2:46
14.	"Wonton Special"	1:49
15.	"Taco Delay"	1:56
16.	"Lifesized Stuffed Animal"	2:55
17.	"Sometimes"	3:31
