= Duality (mixtape) =

2012 debut mixtape by Captain Murphy

Mixtape by Captain Murphy
- Released: November 28, 2012
- Genres: Alternative hip-hop; experimental hip-hop
- Length: 36:39
- Label: Brainfeeder
- Producers: Alejandro Jodorowsky; Flying Lotus; Jeremiah Jae; Just Blaze; Madlib; Samiyam; Teebs; TNGHT

Flying Lotus chronology
Until the Quiet Comes (2012)	Duality (2012)	Ideas+Drafts+Loops (2013)

Instrumentals

Professional ratings
Review scores
Source	Rating
Consequence of Sound	B
Free City Sounds	B
Pitchfork	8.0/10

Duality (stylized as DU∆LITY) is the debut mixtape from Captain Murphy, the animated rapper alter-ego of experimental musician Flying Lotus. It was initially released as a 34-minute short film featuring songs performed by Murphy as well as archived cult footage (including footage involving Heaven's Gate co-founder Marshall Applewhite), pornography, cartoons and 1980s films. A deluxe edition was released for download on November 28, 2012, with tracks separated, as well as bonus tracks and instrumentals.

== Background ==
Captain Murphy first appeared over the summer of 2012 on the Flying Lotus-produced track "Between Friends" for the 2012 Adult Swim Singles Program. The track also featured Odd Future's Earl Sweatshirt trading verses with Murphy. Speculation began to arise that Murphy was either Tyler, The Creator, Earl Sweatshirt, Flying Lotus, or a combination of the three due to the frequent pitch shifts in vocals. Between July and September 2012, Murphy released several music videos on YouTube that featured animation by lilfuchs. Over the months, Captain Murphy began hinting toward his debut project Duality, which was scheduled to be released in November 2012.

== Release ==
On November 15, 2012, Captain Murphy started a website and posted a 34-minute video titled "Duality" that featured his music as well as archived cult footage and lilfuchs-produced animation. He then began hinting at a deluxe version with separated tracks, bonus tracks and instrumentals. On November 28, Murphy released the deluxe version for download, along with the launch of a merchandise line. The mixtape was released with separate artwork for each track, created by lilfuchs. The album features samples from the 1987 film Robocop, also referenced in Flying Lotus' rap name Captain Murphy after the titular Officer Murphy, as well as recordings of Marshall Applewhite of Heaven's gate, Carey Burtt's Mind Control Made Easy, Kenneth Anger's Invocation of my demon brother, Lucifer Rising, and archival documentary recordings.

On the night of the deluxe version release, Murphy played his first show at the Low End Theory in Los Angeles, California. He performed his set in a cloak to conceal his identity, but toward the end of the show, he revealed himself to be Flying Lotus.

== Track listing ==
No.	Title	Producer(s)	Length
1.	"Disciples"		0:43
2.	"El Topo"	Alejandro Jodorowsky	1:10
3.	"Mighty Morphin' Foreskin"	Flying Lotus	3:32
4.	"The Ritual"	Just Blaze, Jeremiah Jae	3:09
5.	"Between Friends" (featuring Earl Sweatshirt)	Flying Lotus	3:40
6.	"Children of the Atom"	Madlib, Flying Lotus	1:45
7.	"Jalapeños"	Jeremiah Jae	1:19
8.	"Gloe"	Jeremiah Jae	1:24
9.	"The Killing Joke"	Flying Lotus	2:02
10.	"Hovercrafts and Cows"	Flying Lotus	2:01
11.	"Gone Fishing" (featuring Jeremiah Jae)	Flying Lotus	3:37
12.	"Drive Thru"	Samiyam	2:08
13.	"Immaculation" (featuring Azizi Gibson & Jeremiah Jae)	Flying Lotus	3:05
14.	"The Prisoner"	Teebs	1:56
15.	"Shake Weight" (Bonus track)	TNGHT	2:30

Instrumentals
No.	Title	Producer(s)	Length
1.	"El Topo"	Alejandro Jodorowsky	0:50
2.	"Mighty Morphin' Foreskin"	Flying Lotus	2:35
3.	"The Ritual"	Just Blaze, Jeremiah Jae	3:13
4.	"Between Friends"	Flying Lotus	2:27
5.	"Children of the Atom"	Madlib, Flying Lotus	1:39
6.	"Jalapeños"	Jeremiah Jae	1:20
7.	"Gloe"	Jeremiah Jae	1:26
8.	"The Killing Joke"	Flying Lotus	1:57
9.	"Hovercrafts and Cows"	Flying Lotus	2:41
10.	"Gone Fishing"	Flying Lotus	3:40
11.	"Immaculation"		3:07
12.	"The Prisoner"	Teebs	1:59
13.	"Drive Thru"	Samiyam	1:25
14.	"Personalities" (Bonus track)		2:04
15.	"The Idea" (Bonus track)		3:09

Bonus track
No.	Title	Length
1.	"Innocence 2"	2:09
