= Reset (Flying Lotus EP) =

EP by Flying Lotus
- Released: October 1, 2007
- Recorded: September 2007
- Genres: Electronic; instrumental hip-hop
- Length: 17:32
- Label: Warp
- Producer: Flying Lotus

Flying Lotus chronology
1983 (2006)	Reset (2007)	Los Angeles (2008)

Reset is an EP by American electronic music producer Flying Lotus. It was released by Warp Records on October 1, 2007.

== Critical reception ==
Professional ratings
Review scores
Source	Rating
BBC	(favorable)
Drowned in Sound	(8/10)
Exclaim!	(favorable)
The Skinny	3/5 stars

Charles Ubaghs of Drowned in Sound gave the EP an 8 out of 10, saying: "If he can expand on what he's accomplished here with the same level of technical skill and vision, then Flying Lotus just might be onto something that forces us all to stand up and take notice in the very near future." Stephanie Kale of Exclaim! said: "The closest comparison is J Dilla's Donuts - the grooves come hard and fast like sweet interludes that keep you wanting more."

Jack McFarlane of The Skinny described "Tea Leaf Dancers" as "a seductive and sultry post-midnight slow dancer with top 40 written all over it".

== Track listing ==
No.	Title	Length
1.	"Tea Leaf Dancers" (featuring Andreya Triana)	3:12
2.	"Vegas Collie"	2:18
3.	"Massage Situation"	2:47
4.	"Spicy Sammich"	4:15
5.	"Bonus Beat"	0:51
6.	"Dance Floor Stalker"	4:10
