= Flamagra =

Studio album by Flying Lotus
- Released: May 24, 2019
- Recorded: 2015–2019
- Genres: Jazz-funk; hip-hop; electronic
- Length: 66:57
- Label: Warp
- Producer: Flying Lotus

Flying Lotus chronology
You're Dead! (2014)	Flamagra (2019)	Yasuke (2021)

Singles from Flamagra
- 1. "Fire Is Coming" Released: April 17, 2019; 2. "Spontaneous / Takashi" Released: April 23, 2019; 3. "More" Released: May 8, 2019; 4. "Black Balloons Reprise" Released: May 21, 2019

Alternative cover
- Deluxe Edition cover art

Flamagra is the sixth studio album by American record producer Flying Lotus (Steven Ellison), released on May 24, 2019 by Warp Records. It is his first album since You're Dead! in 2014. The lead single, the spoken-word "Fire Is Coming" featuring David Lynch, was released along with its video on April 17, 2019. The album also features contributions from Anderson .Paak, George Clinton, Little Dragon, Tierra Whack, Denzel Curry, Shabazz Palaces, Thundercat, Toro y Moi and Solange. A deluxe version of the album with the instrumentals was released on May 29, 2020.

== Background ==
Ellison said that he had gathered different material from the past five years in the process of making the record, and had a "thematic idea" about making an album with a fire concept during that time. He imagined an "eternal flame sitting on a hill", and upon hearing David Lynch talking at a party he was attending, asked him to record the same words for his album, at which point he said the idea for the album became fixed.

The track "Post Requisite" was featured on the soundtrack of Ellison's 2017 feature film Kuso and was accompanied by a music video. Prior to the album's release, the tracks "Fire Is Coming", "Spontaneous", "Takashi", "More" and "Black Balloons Reprise" were released as singles. The latter is a reprise of the song of the same name from Denzel Curry's 2018 album Ta13oo. The opening track "Heroes" is a new version of the previously released song "Heroes Pt. 5".

== Critical reception ==
Professional ratings
Aggregate scores
Source	Rating
AnyDecentMusic?	7.8/10
Metacritic	80/100
Review scores
Source	Rating
AllMusic	3.5/5 stars
The A.V. Club	B+
The Guardian	3/5 stars
The Independent	4/5 stars
The Irish Times	5/5 stars
Mojo	4/5 stars
NME	5/5 stars
Pitchfork	7.8/10
Q	4/5 stars
Rolling Stone	4/5 stars

At Metacritic, which assigns a normalized rating out of 100 to reviews from mainstream publications, Flamagra received an average score of 80, based on 27 reviews.

=== Year-end rankings ===
Publication	Accolade	Rank	Ref.
Afisha Daily (Russia)	The Best Foreign Albums of 2019	20	

== Commercial performance ==
As of July 2019, the album has moved 10,000 units in United States.

== Track listing ==
Credits adapted from liner notes.

No.	Title	Writer(s)	Length
1.	"Heroes"	Steven Ellison; Stephen Bruner	2:44
2.	"Post Requisite"	Ellison; Bruner	2:08
3.	"Heroes in a Half Shell"	Ellison; Bruner; Brandon Coleman	1:17
4.	"More" (featuring Anderson .Paak)	Ellison; Anderson .Paak; Bruner; Justin Brown; Dennis Hamm	4:17
5.	"Capillaries"	Ellison	1:54
6.	"Burning Down the House" (featuring George Clinton)	Ellison; George Clinton; Bruner; Coleman	3:03
7.	"Spontaneous" (featuring Little Dragon)	Ellison; Yukimi Nagano; Erik Bodin; Fredrik Wallin; Håkan Wirenstrand; Bruner; Coleman	2:08
8.	"Takashi"	Ellison; Syunsuke Ono; Bruner; Coleman	5:51
9.	"Pilgrim Side Eye"	Ellison; Herbie Hancock; Bruner; Miguel Atwood-Ferguson	1:30
10.	"All Spies"	Ellison	1:45
11.	"Yellow Belly" (featuring Tierra Whack)	Ellison; Tierra Whack	3:11
12.	"Black Balloons Reprise" (featuring Denzel Curry)	Ellison; Denzel Curry; Bruner	2:41
13.	"Fire Is Coming" (featuring David Lynch)	Ellison; David Lynch; Bruner; Atwood-Ferguson; Hamm	3:16
14.	"Inside Your Home"	Ellison; Bruner	1:26
15.	"Actually Virtual" (featuring Shabazz Palaces)	Ellison; Ishmael Butler; Bruner; Coleman	1:58
16.	"Andromeda"	Ellison; Bruner	1:28
17.	"Remind U"	Ellison; Coleman	2:41
18.	"Say Something"	Ellison; Bruner; Atwood-Ferguson; Hamm	1:15
19.	"Debbie Is Depressed"	Ellison; Bruner	2:19
20.	"Find Your Own Way Home"	Ellison; Taylor Graves	1:40
21.	"The Climb" (featuring Thundercat)	Ellison; Bruner; Atwood-Ferguson; Coleman	3:15
22.	"Pygmy"	Ellison; Bruner	1:24
23.	"9 Carrots" (featuring Toro y Moi)	Ellison; Toro y Moi; Atwood-Ferguson	3:01
24.	"FF4"	Ellison; Atwood-Ferguson	1:11
25.	"Land of Honey" (featuring Solange)	Ellison; Solange; Robert Glasper; Bruner; Atwood-Ferguson	3:27
26.	"Thank U Malcolm"	Ellison; Coleman; Bruner	1:32
27.	"Hot Oct."	Ellison; Bruner	4:35
Total length:			66:57

Japanese edition bonus track
No.	Title	Writer(s)	Length
28.	"Quarantine"	Ellison; Bruner	3:48
Total length:			70:45

Sample credits

- "Post Requisite" contains a sample of "Everything You Do Is a Balloon" by Boards of Canada.
- "Heroes in a Half Shell" contains audio samples of the Dragon Ball series.
- "Black Balloons Reprise" contains a sample of "Ten Et Tiwa" by Alain Goraguer.
- "Debbie Is Depressed" contains a sample of the theme for the Wii Shop Channel by Kazumi Totaka.

== Personnel ==
Credits adapted from liner notes.

Musicians

- Miguel Atwood-Ferguson – strings (1, 3, 12, 19, 20, 26)
- Ashley Norelle – backing vocals (4)
- Taylor Graves – keyboards (4)
- Ronald Bruner – drums (8, 26), backing vocals (20)
- Deantoni Parks – drums (19, 21)
- Niki Randa – backing vocals (20)
- Thundercat – bass (1, 2, 4, 6–9, 12–16, 19, 21, 22, 26, 27), Backing vocals (20, 21)

Technical

- Flying Lotus – mixing
- Daddy Kev – mixing, mastering

Artwork

- Winston Hacking – artwork
- Echelon Color – retouching
- Stephen Serrato – layout
- Guccimaze – typeface design
- Joph (Jeong-woo Jo) – portrait

== Charts ==
Chart (2019)	Peak position
Australian Albums (ARIA)	55
Austrian Albums (Ö3 Austria)	47
Belgian Albums (Ultratop Flanders)	16
Belgian Albums (Ultratop Wallonia)	122
Canadian Albums (Billboard)	74
Dutch Albums (Album Top 100)	60
German Albums (Offizielle Top 100)	20
Japan Hot Albums (Billboard Japan)	36
Japanese Albums (Oricon)	28
Lithuanian Albums (AGATA)	96
Scottish Albums (Official Charts)	20
UK Albums (Official Charts)	25
US Billboard 200	45
US Independent Albums (Billboard)	5
US Top Dance Albums (Billboard)	1
US Indie Store Album Sales (Billboard)	1
