= Los Angeles (Flying Lotus album) =

Studio album by Flying Lotus
- Released: July 9, 2008
- Recorded: September 2007 – March 2008
- Genres: Lofi hip-hop; experimental hip-hop; instrumental hip-hop; electronic; IDM
- Length: 43:17
- Label: Warp
- Producers: Flying Lotus (also exec.); Byron the Aquarius; The Gaslamp Killer; Matthewdavid; Samiyam

Flying Lotus chronology
Reset (2007)	Los Angeles (2008)	Cosmogramma (2010)

Los Angeles is the second studio album by American electronic music producer Flying Lotus, released on July 9, 2008 by Warp Records. The cover was designed by British graphic design agency Build featuring photography by Timothy Saccenti, and the album is named after Flying Lotus' place of birth.

== Critical reception ==
Professional ratings
Aggregate scores
Source	Rating
Metacritic	81/100
Review scores
Source	Rating
AllMusic	5/5 stars
Clash	10/10
Drowned in Sound	8/10
The Irish Times	3/5 stars
The Observer	4/5 stars
Pitchfork	8.5/10
Resident Advisor	5/5
Spin	4/5 stars
URB	4/5 stars
XLR8R	9/10

At Metacritic, which assigns a weighted average score out of 100 to reviews from mainstream critics, Los Angeles received an average score of 81 based on 13 reviews, indicating "universal acclaim".

Resident Advisor ranked Los Angeles as the third best album of 2008, while Fact ranked it as the year's tenth best album. Pitchfork placed it at number 28 on its list of the best albums of 2008. In 2017, Los Angeles ranked at number 14 on Pitchfork's list of "The 50 Best IDM Albums of All Time".

== Track listing ==
All songs produced by Flying Lotus except where noted.

No.	Title	Producer(s)	Length
1.	"Brainfeeder"		1:31
2.	"Breathe . Something/Stellar STar"		3:20
3.	"Beginners Falafel"		2:28
4.	"Camel"		2:22
5.	"Melt!"		1:45
6.	"Comet Course"		3:01
7.	"Orbit 405"		0:44
8.	"Golden Diva"	Flying Lotus; Matthewdavid	4:02
9.	"Riot"		4:02
10.	"GNG BNG"	Flying Lotus; The Gaslamp Killer	3:38
11.	"Parisian Goldfish"		3:01
12.	"Sleepy Dinosaur"		1:55
13.	"RobertaFlack" (featuring Ahu)	Flying Lotus; Samiyam; Byron the Aquarius	3:07
14.	"SexSlaveShip"	Flying Lotus; Matthewdavid	2:14
15.	"Auntie's Harp"		0:55
16.	"Testament" (featuring Gonjasufi)		2:28
17.	"Auntie's Lock/Infinitum" (featuring Laura Darlington)		2:44
Total length:			43:17

Japanese edition bonus tracks
No.	Title	Length
18.	"Interference"	2:46
19.	"Backpack Caviar"	3:23
Total length:		49:26

== Charts ==
Chart (2008)	Peak position
US Top Dance Albums (Billboard)	16
