= Samiyam =

American hip hop producer

- Born: Sam Baker; Ann Arbor, Michigan
- Origin: Los Angeles, California
- Genres: Hip hop
- Instruments: Sampler; turntable; drum machine; synthesizer
- Years active: 2002–present
- Labels: Brainfeeder; Hyperdub; Poo-Bah; Stones Throw; Leaving
- Website: www.stonesthrow.com/artist/samiyam/

Sam Baker, better known by his stage name Samiyam, is an American hip hop producer based in Los Angeles, California.

== Life and career ==
Samiyam released the Return EP on Hyperdub in 2008. He also released Rap Beats Vol. 1 in the same year.

His official debut album, Sam Baker's Album, was released on Brainfeeder in 2011. He returned with the album, Wish You Were Here, in 2013.

In 2015, his collaborative track with Earl Sweatshirt and Budgie, titled "Quest/Power", was uploaded to SoundCloud. In 2016, he released the album, Animals Have Feelings, which featured guest appearances from the likes of Earl Sweatshirt, Action Bronson, and Jeremiah Jae.

== Discography ==
=== Albums ===
- Rap Beats Vol. 1 (2008)
- Sam Baker's Album (2011)
- Wish You Were Here (2013)
- Animals Have Feelings (2016)
- Pizza Party (2017)
- I Got Sh*t to Do (2019)
- one on each planet (2019)
- reflectionz (2019)

=== EPs ===
- Return (2008)
- Man vs. Machine (2009)
- Los Angeles 3/10 (2010) (split with Ras G)

=== Productions ===
- Daedelus - "Make It So (Samiyam Remix)" (2008)
- Flying Lotus - "RobertaFlack" from Los Angeles (2008)
- Flying Lotus - "Grapesicles (Samiyam Remix)" from L.A. EP 2 X 3 (2008)
- Exile - "Population Control (Samiyam Remix)" from Radio AM/FM (2010)
- Blu - "NotU.mov" (2010)
- Blu - "Everybody Nose", "Soupa", and "Jazmine" from York (2011)
- Pharoahe Monch - "Haile Selassie Karate" from W.A.R. (We Are Renegades) (2011)
- Shigeto - "And We Gonna (Samiyam Chopsticks Remix)" from Shigeto Presents: Full Circle Remixes (2011)
- Captain Murphy - "Drive Thru" from Duality (2012)
- The Gaslamp Killer - "Peasants, Cripples & Retards" from Breakthrough (2012)
- Earl Sweatshirt - "20 Wave Caps" from Doris (2013)
- Joey Badass - "O.C.B." from B4.Da.$$ (2015)
- Earl Sweatshirt - "Quest/Power" (2015)
- Cohen - "E Efshar" from Rap (2015)
- Evidence - "To Make a Long Story Longer" (featuring Jonwayne) from Weather or Not (2018)
- Action Bronson - "Splash" from Only For Dolphins (2020)
- Earl Sweatshirt - "Lobby (interlude)" from Sick! (2022)
- Danny Brown - "Celibate" from Quaranta (2023)
