= Pattern+Grid World =

EP by Flying Lotus
- Released: September 20, 2010
- Genres: Electronica, hip-hop, dubstep, wonky, IDM, glitch
- Length: 18:41
- Label: Warp
- Producer: Flying Lotus

Flying Lotus chronology
Cosmogramma (2010)	Pattern+Grid World (2010)	Until the Quiet Comes (2012)

Pattern+Grid World is an EP by American electronic producer Flying Lotus. It was released by Warp Records on September 20, 2010.

== Release and reception ==
Warp Records first released Pattern+Grid World in the United Kingdom on September 20, 2010; its release in the United States was the following day. The EP's sixth track "Camera Day" was later sampled for rapper Killer Mike's 2011 song "Swimming", which was released as part of Adult Swim's single series.

Pattern+Grid World received widespread acclaim from critics. At Metacritic, which assigns a normalized rating out of 100 to reviews from mainstream publications, the EP received an average score of 82, based on 10 reviews. The Wire wrote that while Flying Lotus pursued similar ideas on his previous album Cosmogramma, Pattern+Grid World "seemed to favor consistent, looping palettes and original electronics over the latter's ad hoc sampling". PopMatters critic Dylan Nelson found it "tighter, more balanced, more claustrophobic and more melodic" than its predecessor, while Larry Fitzmaurice from Pitchfork said it sounded "fully formed and precisely assembled". Robert Christgau from MSN Music was somewhat less enthusiastic, citing "PieFace" and "Clay" as highlights while reducing his review of the EP to the description "notes for an aural jigsaw puzzle".

== Track listing ==
All tracks are written by Flying Lotus.

No.	Title	Length
1.	"Clay"	2:53
2.	"Kill Your Co-Workers"	3:04
3.	"PieFace"	2:34
4.	"Time Vampires"	2:23
5.	"Jurassic Notion/M Theory"	3:15
6.	"Camera Day"	2:23
7.	"Physics for Everyone!"	2:09

Japanese release bonus track
No.	Title	Length
8.	"One for Koopa"	2:40

== Personnel ==
Credits are adapted from AllMusic.

- Flying Lotus – composer, engineer, producer
- Thundercat - bass
- Jason Goz – mastering
- Theo Ellsworth – design, illustrations
