= The Long Lost =

American musical duet

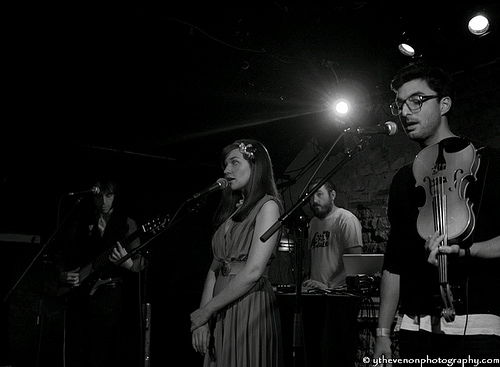
- Daedelus (left) and Laura Darlington (center) performing in Metz, France, 2009.

Background information
- Origin: Santa Monica, California
- Genres: Folk, lo-fi, psychedelic
- Years active: 1998–present
- Labels: Ninja Tune
- Members: Daedelus; Laura Darlington

The Long Lost is a collaboration between American musicians Daedelus and Laura Darlington. The pair are also husband and wife. They dated in high school after initially meeting as members of their high school orchestra, as well as partners in the ballroom dance club. After a few years apart, they re-met and gradually formed this project. In 2009, the duo released the first studio album, The Long Lost, on Ninja Tune. Daedelus has stated that they were working on more collaborative material back in 2010.

== Discography ==
=== Albums ===
- The Long Lost (2009)

=== Singles ===
- "Woebegone" (2008)
- "Amiss" (2009)
