= Babel =

Babel is a name used in the Hebrew Bible for the city of Babylon and may refer to:

== Arts and media ==
=== Written works ===
==== Books ====
- Babel (book), by Patti Smith
- Babel (2012 manga), by Narumi Shigematsu
- Babel (2017 manga), by Yūgo Ishikawa
- Babel, a 1922 novel by John Cournos
- Babel, a 1969 novel by Alan Burns
- Babel, 2016, by Zygmunt Bauman and Ezio Mauro
- Babel, 2018, about linguistics by Gaston Dorren
- Babel-17, a 1966 science fiction novel by Samuel R. Delany
- Babel, or the Necessity of Violence, a 2022 novel by R. F. Kuang

==== Periodicals ====
- Babel (magazine), about linguistics
- Babel, a journal produced by the Australian Federation of Modern Language Teachers Associations
- Babel, a journal published by the International Federation of Translators
- Babel (newspaper), an Iraqi newspaper

=== Film and television ===
==== Star Trek ====
- "Babel" (Star Trek: Deep Space Nine), an episode of Star Trek: Deep Space Nine
- Babel (planet), a neutrally aligned planet in the Star Trek universe
- "Babel One", an episode of Star Trek: Enterprise
- "Journey to Babel", an episode of Star Trek (original series)

==== Other uses in film and television ====
- Babel (1999 film), directed by Gérard Pullicino
- Babel (2006 film), directed by Alejandro González Iñárritu
- Babel (TV series), a 2019 South Korean television series
- "Babel", an episode of Green Lantern: The Animated Series
- "Babel", an episode of Batman Beyond
- "The Sausages of Babel", Dutch TV-presenting trio

=== Music ===
==== Albums ====
- Babel (D*Note album), 1993
- Babel (Mumford & Sons album), 2012, by Mumford & Sons, or its title track (see below)
- Babel (soundtrack), by Gustavo Santaolalla, the soundtrack album from the 2006 film
- Babel, by German electronic musician Klaus Schulze, 1987
- Babel, by Hughes de Courson, 2008
- Babel, by Gabriel Yacoub, 1997
- Babel, by Philip Catherine, 1980

==== Songs ====
- "Babel" (song), the title track of the album Babel by Mumford & Sons
- "Babel", from the album Heligoland by Massive Attack

==== Other uses in music ====
- Babel Label, a British record label
- Babel (Stravinsky), a 1944 cantata

=== In other media ===
- Babel (radio station), Uruguay
- Babel, a Turbo CD role-playing game released by Nippon Telenet

== Places ==
- Babel, Carmarthenshire, a village in Wales
- Babel, Khuzestan, a village in Iran
- Babel Island, Tasmania, Australia
- Babel River, Alaska, US
- Bangka Belitung, a province in Indonesia, abbreviated Babel
- Babil Governorate, in Iraq (named after Babylon) is sometimes transliterated as "Babel"
- Mount Babel (Alberta), Canada
- Mount Babel (Quebec), Canada

== Science and technology ==
- 5808 Babelʹ, a minor planet
- Babel (protocol), a routing protocol for wired, wireless, and hybrid IP mesh networks
- Babel (transcompiler), a JavaScript transcompiler
- GPSBabel, GPS file format conversion software
- OpenBabel, open-source chemical modeling software

== Other ==
- Babel (restaurant), in Budapest, Hungary
- Babel (surname)
- Babels, a volunteer translators network
- Bobole, a Coahuiltecan tribe, may be spelled Babel

== See also ==
- Babel fish (disambiguation)
- Tower of Babel (disambiguation)
- Bab (disambiguation)
- Babbel, an online language learning platform
- Babble (disambiguation)
- Bable, an alternative name of the Asturian language of Spain
- Babol, a city in Iran
