= Neō Wax Bloom =

Studio album by Iglooghost
- Released: 29 September 2017
- Recorded: 2016–March 2017
- Genre: Electronic; experimental; wonky; future bass; nu jazz; experimental pop
- Length: 40:58
- Label: Brainfeeder
- Producer: Iglooghost

Iglooghost chronology
Little Grids (2016)	Neō Wax Bloom (2017)	Clear Tamei (2018)

Singles from Neō Wax Bloom
- 1. "Bug Thief" Released: 8 August 2017; 2. "White Gum" Released: 11 September 2017; 3. "Sōlar Blade" Released: 21 September 2017

Neō Wax Bloom is the debut studio album by English electronic musician Seamus Malliagh under his recording alias Iglooghost, released on 29 September 2017 on Brainfeeder. Characterised by complex and energetic song structures, Neō Wax Bloom is a maximalist album which "dismantle[s] any notion of genre before putting the pieces back together in [its] own unique way". The album peaked at number nine on Billboard's American Dance/Electronic Album Sales chart, and received generally positive critical reception upon initial release.

== Background ==
"I think I was arrogant enough to think I was invincible and could wing it through pushing myself over my limits. I ended up just going super-super-Saiyan and fucking up my health by the end of the record. Trying to be as productive as humanly possible can end up as the most hindering thing ever creatively."

– Malliagh on his mental health after making Neō Wax Bloom

Malliagh had wanted to create a full-length studio album since the beginning of his career using the recording alias Iglooghost, but said that he felt he needed to "find a reason to justify making one"; getting to the "eureka moment" of making an album involved "years and years of tantrums and smashing up my stuff in fits of rage". Malliagh began work on Neō Wax Bloom in 2016, with the first track made for the LP being "Bug Thief", and completed it in March 2017. Malliagh described the production of Neō Wax Bloom as being akin to the precision of military training, saying that he was having to "discipline the fuck outta myself and override that natural human instinct to cut corners [...] and I sorta broke my brain in the process". Malliagh spent at least one month per track producing the album with Reason, sometimes one day per two or three measures of a track, and he stated that he had experienced several "semi-mental breakdowns" putting together the album while also having to scrap four tracks that were near completion.

"Göd Grid", the final track on Neō Wax Bloom, was particularly painful for Malliagh as a piece significant to the concept of the album; taking three months to work on the track, his process of production initially yielded an eight minute track, but "there were like 64 bars I fucking hated that I ended up chopping off in the end", and it was subsequently trimmed to a length of four minutes. The file size of the project additionally led to the track being impossible to play through Reason without audio glitches, requiring him to repeatedly save after making minuscule edits. Further contributing to his frustration was the track's particularly fast tempo, which meant "the same amount of effort I'd normally put into writing a bar counted for significantly fewer seconds", although this quirk also applied to the production of other sections of the album.

== Concept ==
Malliagh explained in 2017 that Neō Wax Bloom deals with "primal religious themes" and a "millennial nihilist thing" that had prevented him from having personally consistent spiritual beliefs. In a PopMatters interview marking the album's release, Malliagh additionally joked that the album is based on a real event, stating:

It's a long story. In real life, I live in this huge mansion that changes color, glows in the dark, and has a lot of floating parts/rooms. It's a really weird looking place until you get used to it. Anyway, I have this giant garden I hang out in a lot, and I met these strange little beings through a little portal I found. I learnt about the void some of them live in that's called "Mamu", and how a giant calamity involving two huge eyeballs falling from the sky had completely screwed up their ecosystem. I made a big album inspired by all this stuff. So it's not really a concept album, considering it all actually happened I suppose.

The concept of Neō Wax Bloom is subsequently the story of the creatures, which include a worm named Xiangjiao (previously described in Malliagh's EP Chinese Nü Yr), a "bug thief" named Uso, a "multicoloured pom-pom monk" named Yomi, and a witch named Lummo, trying to recover from the active destruction of their world.

== Composition and style ==
Neō Wax Bloom has been regarded as a maximalist work. According to Jay Balfour in a Pitchfork review of the album, its style creates an "unnerving effect" that comes from its "alien" sound palette, its "frantically" and "aggressively" fast pace, with sounds "immediately fleeting", and the absence of obvious loops or conventionally repeated refrains. As he wrote, only "a soaring, soulful vocal sample that needles its way throughout several tracks" serves as "a rare bit of human comfort". Malliagh clarified that he "really hate[d] when albums have like four tracks that essentially say the same thing", and embarked on the production of the album wanting the tracks to each have a different mood and "purpose": "I set out to never copy/paste a single bar so all the songs would work as these constantly evolving pieces rather than beats". Malliagh also stated that it was "way harder than it sounded when I realized I had to figure out totally unique substrates for more tracks than I'd ever released".

Neō Wax Bloom is similar to other records released on Brainfeeder in that it "dismantle[s] any notion of genre before putting the pieces back together in [its] own unique way", stated Paul Carr of PopMatters. As Malliagh described the album's influences, "it's a big ass amalgamation of the random stuff I listen to in a way. I'd be going to sleep to Balinese music, waking up to Steve Reich or some shit and then going running to loud ass footwork and bass music and old IDM. I think my brain just chewed it all up and spat it out". Malliagh always felt "too exhausted" after working extensively on the production of the album, and refrained from engaging with newer electronic dance music to avoid feeling burnt out. He opted to study new age music, math rock, choral music and Japanese ambient music from the 1980s as reference points for the album. He particularly paid attention to the use of synthesizers to replicate acoustic instruments by Japanese ambient composers, and Neō Wax Bloom subsequently has a sound palette which ambiguously combines both acoustic and electronic sounds.

The album variously explores and eclectically combines genres including trap, J-pop, dancehall, dubstep, wonky, hip hop, future garage, grime, and the PC Music-defined style of bubblegum bass. A vocal sample of Charlotte Day Wilson's performance on a song by Iglooghost released in 2016 titled "Gold Tea" recurs throughout the album, processed and harmonized in different ways in each track. There are also other appearances of vocals on the album, such as a sample of British rapper AJ Tracey's "Naila" on "White Gum", American rapper Mr. Yote's verse on "Teal Yomi / Olivine", and Japanese singer-songwriter Cuushe's singing on the ballad "Infinite Mint", all of which are variously pitch-shifted to sound distinctly characterised.

== Release and promotion ==
Neō Wax Bloom was promoted by the release of the singles "Bug Thief" (8 August 2017), "White Gum", (11 September), and "Sōlar Blade" (21 September). "Sōlar Blade" also had a 3D music video that was directed by Mushbuh and premiered on 23 September 2017 via Adult Swim. Brainfeeder issued Neō Wax Bloom on 29 September 2017. Vinyl releases of the LP come with a 12-page comic strip as well as stickers of the characters in the album's story. Selling 1,000 copies in its first week of release, Neō Wax Bloom debuted at number nine on Billboard's United States Dance/Electronic Album Sales chart.

== Critical reception ==
Professional ratings
Aggregate scores
Source	Rating
AnyDecentMusic?	7.6/10
Metacritic	83/100
Review scores
Source	Rating
AllMusic	4/5 stars
Clash	8/10
Earbuddy	6/10
Exclaim!	7/10
Gigsoup	86%
Loud and Quiet	9/10
Pitchfork	7.3/10
PopMatters	9/10 stars
Spectrum Culture	3.75/5 stars

At Metacritic, which assigns a weighted mean rating out of 100 to reviews from mainstream publications, Neō Wax Bloom received a score of 83, based on 6 reviews, indicating "universal acclaim".

London in Stereo honored Neō Wax Bloom as "a record of rare originality and dizzying immersion". An AllMusic journalist claimed that "if you're up for a highly creative, exhilarating sugar rush, Neō Wax Bloom will undoubtedly be one of the most joyous surprises of the year". A Noah Harrison, calling Iglooghost "one of today's most inventive producers", labeled the album as "nothing short of sonic onslaught… in the best way possible". Gigsoup praised the LP's "unpredictable, complex and rewarding" production, particularly on the song "Solar Blade", and its originality in terms of sounds and melodies. Brett Peters claimed that with the album, "Malliagh presents himself as a highly capable producer, finding both innovation and a unique lane for his music in one of the most saturated modern genres". Clash magazine stated it "begs for multiple listens and, once you've digested every morsel, you'll be wanting to visit Mamu more often", and Exclaim! described it as a "fantastical cartoon that's crash-landed in reality, and it begs your attention".

Some critics highlighted how clear and cohesive Mallagh made the LP's otherwise frantic compositions and production. A Nest HQ reviewer was one of them, claiming, "Iglooghost executes with a technical precision that which would make any music theory nerd foam at the mouth, while still remaining accessible to less pretentious ears moving across a club floor". He favorably labeled Iglooghost as a "fresh voice, challenging our preconceived notions on what constitutes club-ready dance music and exploring the boundaries between the cerebral and the visceral". Loud and Quiet's Stephen Butchard jokingly honored it as "an epic ode to short-attention spans that will make you glad it fried your brain with information and desensitised you to bright lights". He praised the album's "otherworldly quality" and its lack of repetition that gives it a tingly "human element". However, some reviewers felt the album was too tiresome to listen to due to its chaotic and overstuffed structure.

=== Year-end list rankings ===
Publication	Rank
AllMusic (Electronic)	*
Exclaim! (Dance and Electronic)	7
Loud and Quiet	26
Nest HQ	37
Mixmag	37
PopMatters	15
PopMatters (Avant-Garde and Experimental Music)	4
Sputnikmusic	28
"*" indicates an unordered list.

== Track listing ==
Track lengths derived from Apple Music.

No.	Title	Length
1.	"Pale Eyes"	2:24
2.	"Super Ink Burst"	3:27
3.	"Bug Thief"	3:19
4.	"Sōlar Blade"	3:53
5.	"White Gum"	4:10
6.	"Purity Shards"	1:38
7.	"Zen Champ"	3:23
8.	"Infinite Mint" (featuring Cuushe)	5:35
9.	"Teal Yomi / Olivine" (featuring Mr. Yote)	5:14
10.	"Peanut Choker"	3:36
11.	"Göd Grid"	4:19
Total length:		40:58

== Release history ==
Region	Date	Format(s)	Label
Worldwide	29 September 2017	CD; digital download; vinyl	Brainfeeder

== Charts ==
Chart (2017)	Peak position
US Dance/Electronic Album Sales (Billboard)	9
