= Tower of Babel (disambiguation) =

The Tower of Babel in the Hebrew Bible was a tower built by a united humanity in an attempt to reach the heavens.

Tower of Babel may also refer to:

== Artwork ==
- The Tower of Babel (Bruegel), painting by Pieter Bruegel the Elder
- The Tower of Babel (M. C. Escher), woodcut by Maurits Cornelis Escher

== Games ==
- Tower of Babel (board game), board game by Reiner Knizia
- Tower of Babel (1986 video game), a video game by Namco for the Famicom and the Sharp X68000
- Tower of Babel (1989 video game), computer game for the Amiga, Atari ST and Acorn Archimedes
- The Tower of Babel, a location in the RPG Final Fantasy IV, translated as the Tower of Babil
- The Tower of Babel, a temple to the god Marduk in Indiana Jones and the Infernal Machine
- The Tower of Babel, a location in the Super NES game Illusion of Gaia

== Literature ==
- Babel Tower, an A. S. Byatt novel published in 1996
- JLA: Tower of Babel, a Justice League of America story arc
- "Tower of Babylon" (story), science fiction novelette by Ted Chiang
- Tower of Babel: The Evidence Against the New Creationism, book by Robert T. Pennock
- The Tower of Babel (novel), a 1968 novel by Morris West
- The Tower of Babble: Sins, Secrets and Successes inside the CBC, book by Richard Stursberg
- Star Trek: Enterprise – Rise of the Federation – Tower of Babel, a Star Trek: Enterprise novel by Christopher L. Bennett

== Music ==
- "Tower of Babble" or "Tower of Babel", the prologue in the musical Godspell
- "Tower of Babel", a song from Elton John's 1975 album, Captain Fantastic and the Brown Dirt Cowboy

== Other uses ==
- "Tower of Babel" (Dilbert), episode of the TV cartoon show Dilbert
- The Tower (tarot card), which is sometimes called The Tower of Babel
- Tower of Babel (Utah), a butte in Arches National Park, USA
- Tower of Babel (website), an etymological project by linguist Georgiy Starostin

== See also ==
- Babel (disambiguation)
