= Anomie Belle =

American musician

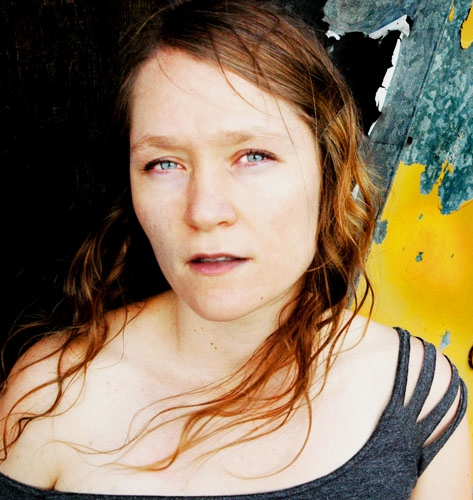
- Anomie Belle in 2009

Background information
- Genres: electronic, trip hop, art pop, experimental, neo soul, avant-garde, glitch
- Instruments: vocals, violin, guitar, synthesizer, drums, electronics, bass, laptop, sampler, drum machine, live looping
- Years active: 2008–present
- Labels: Diving Bell, Ninja Tune
- Website: Official Site

Anomie Belle Campbell (an·o·me bel) is an American multi-instrumentalist, vocalist, songwriter, producer, and artivist from Seattle. Originally a classically trained violinist and songwriter, Anomie began writing and recording music as a child. Anomie has since developed an eclectic and avant-garde musical style that incorporates aspects of electronic, classical, art pop, experimental, trip hop, glitch, and soul.

Anomie's music grapples with issues ranging from critiques of power to intimacy and sexuality, and often explores the emotional experiences of "beautiful alienation" created by the isolation and passive guilt of unsustainable lifestyles that are destructive to human well-being and the natural environment. Anomie has also highlighted these issues in collaboration with artists across disciplines, including Culture Jammers such as The Yes Men and transgender choreographer, Sean Dorsey. Anomie is queer and blurs typical representations of sexuality and gender.

== History ==
Anomie released a debut album Sleeping Patterns in November 2008. In support of the release, Anomie toured with Little Dragon and Manuok. Sleeping Patterns garnered further commercial success after the song How Can I Be Sure appeared in the Xbox 360 game Alan Wake. Anomie toured extensively in 2009, 2010, 2011 in the US and Canada, first with The Album Leaf, and then with Tricky, and later with Gustavo Santaolalla's band Bajofondo. Live performances feature Anomie performing vocals, violin, electric guitar, keyboards, bass, drum machine, samplers and programming by looping themself live. During a second tour with The Album Leaf and Sea Wolf, Anomie also performed with The Album Leaf for their entire set.

Anomie's second album, The Crush, released in September 2011. It includes collaborations with Mr. Lif, Jon Auer of The Posies, and Trespassers William lead vocalist Anna-Lynne Williams, all of whom Anomie has performed with on stage during their respective live performances. Anomie followed The Crush with several EPs, featuring members of the Sneaker Pimps, remixes, and covers of Ain't No Sunshine and Everything in Its Right Place.

In 2012 Anomie contributed vocals and production to several tracks on Eighty One, the album from Ninja Tune artist Yppah. The two artists met when they performed together on tour with Bonobo. Over the next two years, Anomie toured in support of the album as a featured artist during live Yppah performances, performing on guitar, keys, violin, drum machine and vocals.

Flux, Anomie's third album, features an interdisciplinary art project exploring disillusionment and the search for identity, and was released in the US in August 2016, and worldwide in 2017. Fourteen visual art pieces were curated by photographer and frequent music collaborator, Fiona Smith, to accompany the album in an artbook, featuring new works from Marco Mazzoni, Redd Walitzki, Mark Demsteader, Kari-Lise Alexander, Casey Weldon, Meredith Marsone, Alessandra Maria, Alex Garant, Alpay Efe, Januz Miralles, Maria Teicher, Antonio Velfín, Alexandra Becker-Black and Zin Lim. Each piece is a portrait of Anomie and their music, and was displayed at Modern Eden Gallery. Anomie followed Flux with several EPs, including a cover of King of Carrot Flowers, and a full-length remix album, Flux Remixed, including remixes by Antibalas, Prefuse 73, Blockhead, DJ Nobody, Alex Banks, Diasuke Tanabe, Robot Koch, El Huervo, Cuushe, Monokle, Aiko Aiko, Lushloss, and Televangel of Blue Sky Black Death; with cover art by Minjae Lee (aka GrenoMJ).

In 2018 Anomie created original music (alongside musicians Alex Kelly, Jesse Olsen Bay, Ben Kessler, Grey Reverend) for Sean Dorsey's dance-theater work, Boys in Trouble, which was awarded an Isadora Duncan Award for Best Music/Sound. The work is performed by the 5 dancer-performers of Sean Dorsey Dance, and unpacks contemporary American masculinity with unflinching honesty and from unapologetically trans and queer perspectives. Boys In Trouble premiered in April 2018 at San Francisco's Z Space before launching a 2-year, 20-city international tour. In 2022 Anomie again created original music for Sean Dorsey's dance-theater work. The Lost Art of Dreaming is an invitation to embrace expansive imagination, reconnect with longing, connect with joy and pleasure, toward loving Futures, and it premiered on November 18th, 2022 in San Francisco, before touring extensively over the next two years.

== Discography ==
=== Albums ===
- 2008 Sleeping Patterns
- 2011 The Crush
- 2017 Flux (Diving Bell Co.)
- 2018 Flux Remixed (Diving Bell Co.)

=== Singles and EPs ===
- 2011 How Can I Be Sure EP
- 2011 Inky Drips EP
- 2011 Machine EP
- 2012 Picture Perfect (single) (Japan only)
- 2018 Carrot Flowers EP
- 2018 The Good Life EP
- 2018 Right Way (single)
- 2018 Lovers (single)
- 2018 Saturday Gives (single)

=== Appearances ===
- 2012 Yppah - Eighty One (Ninja Tune)
- 2012 D. Song (feat Anomie Belle) (Ninja Tune)
- 2012 Film Burn (feat Anomie Belle) (Ninja Tune)
- 2012 Believe Me by Trespassers William (Saint Marie Records)
- 2013 Cliff by Lotte Kestner (Saint Marie Records)
- 2018 The Setup (Anomie Belle Remix) by El Huervo (Swedish Columbia)
- 2019 Chasms (feat Ásgeir) by Alex Banks (Mesh)

=== Compilation appearances ===
- 2009 No Lip Vol. 3 (Mohawk Bomb Records)
- 2010 Alan Wake - OST Limited Edition Soundtrack
- 2013 Plush - Original Motion Picture Soundtrack (Varèse Sarabande Records)

=== Contributor ===
- The First Time I Heard David Bowie (2012) by Scott Heim
- HOME (2015) by Marco Mazzoni

== TV, Film and Video Game uses ==
- Anomie wrote and recorded the song "Violence" for the Catherine Hardwicke film Plush
- "February Sun", "How Can I Be Sure", "On TV", "American View", "Before You Leave Me", and "Bedtime Stories" appeared on episodes of Jersey Shore (TV series)
- "How Can I Be Sure" appeared on an episode of United States of Tara
- "Inky Drips", "Privilege", "Before You Leave Me", "How Can I Be Sure", and "February Sun" appeared on episodes of MTV's Friendzone (TV series)
- Anomie scored the short film Dark Material
- "American View" appeared on an episode of Roadtrip Nation
- "How Can I Be Sure" appeared on Xbox 360 and computer game Alan Wake
- Anomie wrote and recorded original music for Shaun Scott's film Seat of Empire
- "Down" appeared in the film L.A., I Hate You
- "John Q Public" appeared on Microsoft Windows game APB: All Points Bulletin
- "Down" appeared in the independent film Jamie and Jessie Are Not Together
- "February Sun" appeared in the film Todo el Mundo tiene a Alguien Menos Yo ("Everybody's Got Somebody But Me")
- "Unwind" and "How Can I Be Sure" appeared in the film Good Kisser
- "D Song" appeared on Netflix's cyberpunk series Altered Carbon (Season 2, Episode 2)
- "Soon Enough" appeared in the dark fantasy television series Bitten
