= Yppah =

American musician (born 1981)

- Born: Jose Luis Corrales Jr. March 31, 1981 (age 45)
- Origin: Long Beach, California, U.S.
- Genres: Electronic, electronic rock
- Occupations: Musician, songwriter, remixer, producer
- Instruments: Guitar, bass, synthesizer, keyboards, drums, melodica, laptop
- Years active: 2004–present
- Labels: Future Archive Recordings, Counter Records, Ninja Tune, Happy End Music
- Formerly of: The Truth
- Website: yppah.bandcamp.com

Joe Corrales Jr., also known as Yppah (pronounced "Yippah"), is an American electronic/rock musician. He is currently signed to Future Archive Recordings and resides in Long Beach, California, United States.

Corrales' 2010 song "Never Mess with Sunday" was sampled in Lil Peep's platinum-certified single "Star Shopping".

== History ==
=== Early years ===
Corrales began playing guitar and bass in rock bands during high school, and later became more involved in electronic music and turntablism. He was involved in the early creation of mashups, and was part of a turntablist group called The Truth. Yppah is influenced by shoegaze, various electronic music, psychedelic soul, and rock music, evidenced by heavy use of reverb, effects, and electronics.

=== You Are Beautiful at All Times ===
His first album, titled You Are Beautiful at All Times, was released in 2006 on the Ninja Tune label. The single "Again with the Subtitles" was released immediately prior to the album, and was featured in the film 21. "It's Not the Same", a song from the album, was used in a trailer for Alone in the Dark, as well as the episode "Last Resort" from the series House. Similarly, the song "In Two, the Weakly" is featured in the CSI episode "Ending Happy".

=== They Know What Ghost Know ===
They Know What Ghost Know was released on May 18, 2009 in the UK, Japan and Australia. The U.S. release date was June 23, 2009. Released to positive reviews, the album has a more pronounced shoegaze and psychedelic sound with "lush" instrumentation. The album crosses into numerous genres, with NME associating it with other DJ-based albums while other reviewers referring to it as "big beat".

=== Eighty One ===
Eighty One was released on February 4, 2012 in Japan and April 2, 2012 worldwide to critical acclaim. Eighty One is Yppah's most widely received album to date, with the singles "Film Burn" and "D. Song" (both featuring Anomie Belle) charting on radio stations across North America and Japan. "D. Song" was featured in the second episode of season two of the Netflix show Altered Carbon. Eighty One features several guest appearances by Seattle artist Anomie Belle who Corrales met when the two artists performed together on tour with Bonobo. Belle has also appeared with Yppah during live performances, performing guitar, keys, violin, drum machine and vocals in support of the album.

=== Tiny Pause ===
On October 22, 2012, Corrales announced that the fourth album was almost complete, containing 11 tracks. The final album was cut down to nine tracks and was officially released on October 16, 2015.

=== Sunset in the Deep End ===
The fifth album from Yppah was released on February 7, 2020 on Future Archive Recordings.

== Discography ==
=== Albums ===
- You Are Beautiful at All Times, Ninja Tune, 2006
- They Know What Ghost Know, Ninja Tune, 2009
- Eighty One, Ninja Tune, 2012
- Tiny Pause, Counter Records, 2015
- Sunset in the Deep End, Future Archive Recordings, 2020

=== Singles ===
- "Again with the Subtitles", Ninja Tune, 2006
- "D. Song" (feat. Anomie Belle), Ninja Tune, 2012
- "Film Burn" (feat. Anomie Belle), Ninja Tune, 2012
- "Bushmills", self-released, 2014

=== Remixes ===
- "Harvest Dance" - DJ Kentaro feat. Hifana (Beat Records), 2007
- "Coisa Do Gringo" - ZerodB (Ninja Tune), 2008

=== Productions ===
- The Use of Of (CD album) - Babel Fishh, 2005
- "A Photo of a Photograph" - Babel Fishh (Best Friends, CD compilation), Happy End Music, 2006
- "Coisa Do Gringo" - ZerodB (Heavyweight Gringos, CD album), Ninja Tune, 2008

=== Compilation appearances ===
- Best Friends - "Again with the Subtitles", Happy End Music 2006
- You Don't Know Us - A New Selection from Ninja Tune - "Again with the Subtitles", Ninja Tune 2006
- Zentertainment 2006 - "Again with the Subtitles", Ninja Tune 2006
- You Don't Know Ninja Cuts DJ Food's 1000 Mask Mix - "Again with the Subtitles", Ninja Tune 2008
- You Don't Know: Ninja Cuts - "Again with the Subtitles", Ninja Tune 2008
