= Sean Dorsey =

Canadian-American dancer and choreographer

- Born: 1972 or 1973 (age 53–54); Vancouver, Canada
- Education: University of British Columbia
- Occupation: Dancer • choreographer • trans rights activist
- Employer(s): Sean Dorsey Dance; Fresh Meat Productions
- Website: seandorseydance.com

Sean Dorsey is a Canadian-American transgender and queer choreographer, dancer, writer and trans rights activist. He is widely recognized as the United States' first acclaimed transgender modern dance choreographer. Dorsey founded his San Francisco-based dance company Sean Dorsey Dance, which incorporates transgender and LGBTQ+ themes into all of their works. Dorsey is also the founder and artistic director of Fresh Meat Productions, a non-profit organization. Fresh Meat Productions creates and commissions new work, presents performing arts programs, conducts education and engagement, and advocates for justice and equity in the Arts. The organization hosts Fresh Meat Festival in San Francisco, an annual festival of transgender and queer performance.

== Biography and education ==
Sean Dorsey is from a working-class background. He was born in Vancouver, British Columbia but has resided in San Francisco, California since 2003.

Dorsey obtained a Bachelor of Arts in Political Science and Women's Studies from the University of British Columbia. He then enrolled in the Community & Economic Development graduate program at Simon Fraser University. He eventually starting formal dance training when he was in his twenties, enrolling at Main Dance Place in Vancouver. Dorsey then began professional dance training at the age of 25. He then joined the site-specific dance company Lizz Roman and Dancers in San Francisco.

== Notable works ==
=== The Outsider Chronicles (2005) ===
"The Outsider Chronicles" was a compilation of five related but individual pieces that were created between 2003 and 2005. The project starts with the 2003 duet "Red Tie, Red Lipstick," featuring Dorsey and Mair Culbreth. The piece is about police brutality against queer and transgender individuals. The second section of "Outsider" is called "Second Kiss," which premiered in 2004. Dorsey and Culbreth play a transgender boy and a cisgender girl. The piece tells the tale of their first kisses together as fourth-graders, and the complications that arose because of their respective gender identities. The next section of "Outsider" was called "6 Hours" and premiered in 2005. The piece portrays the process of coming-out about one's gender identity to a lover. The piece also tackles parental relationships, and the whole thing takes place within the setting of a six-hour road trip. The fourth piece, also from 2005 and entitled "In Closing," was about mindfulness, the passage of time and mortality in a queer romantic relationship. The piece featured Dorsey alongside Culbreth. The final work of "The Outsider Chronicles" was the 2005 piece "Creative." The piece was about gender correction therapy, and was stylistically unique because it was directly addressed to audience members. "Creative" also focused on the idea of physical ornamentation as a negotiation of power and a way to demonstrate discrimination against queer and transgender individuals. The piece demonstrated the performative and immaterial aspects of ornamentation, specifically through the example of knitting. The five distinct stories of "The Outsider Chronicles" were presented as a complete show at ODC Theater (San Francisco) in 2005, and was re-mounted as a full-evening at Dance Mission Theater (San Francisco) in 2006. The work garnered Dorsey two Isadora Duncan Awards and a Goldie Award for performance.

=== Uncovered: The Diary Project (2009) ===
"Uncovered: The Diary Project" is the first of Dorsey's trilogy of full-evening works that reveal previously censored, buried and/or forgotten trans and LGBTQ history: "Uncovered: The Diary Project" (2009), "The Secret History of Love" (2013) and "The Missing Generation" (2015).

"Uncovered: The Diary Project" is an evening-length performance consisting of two works, entitled "Lost/Found" (2007) and "Lou" (2009). Both of these works are built around diary entries. The first piece, "Lost/Found," is a duet danced by Sean Dorsey and Brian Fisher. This 15-minute piece is based upon the diaries of transgender and LGBT people: Dorsey's childhood copy of Norman Rockwell's Diary for a Young Girl and several other diaries of LGBT people.

The second piece, "Lou," is a 45-minute suite of dances performed by Dorsey, Brian Fisher, Juan de la Rosa, and Nol Simonse. "Lou" is based on the lifelong diaries of Lou Sullivan (1951-1991), an trailblazing transgender gay man and activist who lived in San Francisco until his passing from AIDS. Sullivan was the center of the Bay Area and American FTM community during the 1980s. He was considered one of the first gay-identified transgender men to physically transition, and he made many contributions to the transgender community. Dorsey hoped to use his piece to highlight Sullivan's activism as well as his deeper emotional life. "Lou" consists of 12 sections, and is based on two major textual sources: Sullivan's lifelong collection of journals, and Dorsey's own writing. To create "Lou," Dorsey spent a year hand-transcribing 30 years of Sullivan's diaries - which Sullivan bequeathed to San Francsico's GLBT Historical Society's archives before his death from AIDS complications. Dorsey functions as a vessel that preserves and shares Sullivan's legacy, physicalizing the idea of futuritive possibility. "Uncovered: The Diary Project" fights the possibility of historical erasure that transgender people like Dorsey or Sullivan are subject to. "Uncovered" is about the ways our culture remembers, constructs (or erases) history (especially trans history), the negotiation of masculinity by different people, identity negotiation, and the drive towards actualizing desire.

=== The Secret History of Love (2013) ===
Dorsey created "The Secret History of Love" over a two-year period, after which it toured to 20 different U.S. cities. The 75-minute show features the Sean Dorsey Dance company and transgender singer-songwriter Shawna Virago. The piece features athletic modern-dance choreography, partnering, and a musically innovative soundtrack by seven different composers. Dorsey created "The Secret History Of Love" by creating and conducting his National LGBT Elders Oral History Project, in which Dorsey recorded oral history interviews with trans and LGBTQ elders across the US. "The Secret History Of Love" reveals the underground ways that trans and LGBTQ people managed to not only survive but also thrive in decades past, despite tremendous obstacles. The piece was formulated through live interviews and oral accounts from ten LGBTQ seniors, their narratives demonstrating the ways that LGBTQ people survived and loved each other in past decades. These elders' voices and remarkable real-life stories are featured in the work's multi-layered soundscore, along with Dorsey's own writing and central narration. Dorsey's show examines the complexity of being trans, LGBTQ and/or in love while being labeled a sexual and/or social deviant. In older generations, "the LGBTQ community maneuvered, took root despite intolerance, repression and violence against them while implicitly asking the question: will the coming acceptance of alternative lifestyles eventually win broad public approval?" Dorsey expresses how secrecy was a fundamental aspect of trans and LGBTQ life in past generations. The Secret History of Love won an Isadora Duncan Dance Special Achievement Award.

=== The Missing Generation (2015) ===
"The Missing Generation" was Sean Dorsey Dance's 10th Anniversary Season project and arguably Dorsey's most acclaimed work at that date. It was nominated for two different Isadora Duncan Awards, and was awarded an "Izzie" for Best Soundscore/Music/Text. Dorsey received an NEA (National Endowment for the Arts) grant to support the piece's creation in 2014, making Dorsey the first trans dance artist to be awarded an NEA grant. "The Missing Generation" premiered in San Francisco in May 2015. The piece is currently on a 2-year national tour to 20 different cities. "The Missing Generation" gives voice to transgender and LGBTQ longtime survivors of the early AIDS epidemic, portraying the historic and continuing devastating toll that the AIDS epidemic had on transgender and LGBTQ communities during the 1980s and 1990s. While the AIDS crisis was most prominent in the 1980s, Dorsey's work emphasizes the importance of intergenerational sharing and the retainment of history. Dorsey spent two years recording 75 hours of oral history interviews with trans and LGBTQ survivors of the early AIDS crisis, as well as conducting archival research in several cities, including San Francisco, New York City, Atlanta, Maine, and Washington DC. This research resulted in 75 hours of oral material; Dorsey spent over 500 hours building a soundscore that incorporates a fraction of these 75 hours of voices/interviews, and worked with four composers, who created original music for the show's soundscore. The score was composed by Alex Kelly, Ben Kessler, Jesse Olsen Bay, and Jeffrey Alphonsus Mooney. "The Missing Generation" featured Dorsey's 4-member ensemble: three queer cisgender male dancers who performed alongside Sean Dorsey: Nol Simonse, Brian Fisher, and ArVejon Jones.

The dance piece is divided into 16 sections and is a multi-layered fusion of dance, story, theater and movement. Two sections that contextualize the epidemic are called "The Great Rainbow Migration," about the migration of many trans and LGBTQ people away from repressive home towns/cities and into/toward larger urban centers, and "The Long Party," about the sexual revolution of the 1970s. These sections reflect on the many LGBTQ people who formed new "chosen" families after being exiled from their original homes, many of them having to live "double lives" in their everyday lives. Unlike most AIDS narratives, which only focus on homosexual and bisexual cisgender males, Dorsey's piece highlighted the experiences and importance of the transgender community (especially trans women, and especially Black trans women and other trans women of color) within the AIDS epidemic. Trans women of color simultaneously had some of the highest rates of infection and the least access to resources and rights protections. The piece reflected not only on AIDS survivors, but also on the organizations, resources, and activism that held trans and LGBTQ communities together. While political leaders failed to acknowledge or respond to the AIDS pandemic, there was a revolutionary sense of solidarity and compassion within trans and queer communities. The piece is ultimately about themes that everyone can relate to, such as grief, loss, isolation, self-exploration, love, unity, and healing.

In July 2017, "The Missing Generation" was presented at the American Dance Festival in Durham NC, making Dorsey the US' first trans dance artist presented at ADF. In June 2018, The Joyce Theater in New York, NY presented the New York premiere performances of "The Missing Generation," making Dorsey the US' first transgender dance artist to be presented at The Joyce.

=== Boys In Trouble (2018) ===
Dorsey's "Boys In Trouble" premiered in April 2018 at San Francisco's Z Space before launching a 2-year, 20-city international tour. "Boys In Trouble" is an 80-minute dance-theater work that unpacks contemporary American masculinity with unflinching honesty and from unapologetically trans and queer perspectives. The work is performed by the 5 dancer-performers of Sean Dorsey Dance (Sean Dorsey, Brian Fisher, ArVejon Jones, Nol Simonse and Will Woodward), with original music by Alex Kelly, Jesse Olsen Bay, Ben Kessler, Grey Reverend and Anomie Belle.

"Boys In Trouble" utilizes a mix of full-throttle contemporary dance, storytelling, queer partnering, dialogue and monologues and humor to explore themes including toxic masculinity, body shame, whiteness, racism, trans identity, Black queer love and joy, and humorous send-ups of 'butch' and 'macho' identities.

Critics have called "Boys In Trouble" “a visually stunning, emotionally rich, and profoundly timely examination of masculinity and gender by one of the nation’s most visionary choreographers; ” a “poignant [...] mix of happiness, heartbreak, confessional dialogue, salty language, goofy humor and gorgeous partnering;" and “lush, expansive dance.

"Boys in Trouble” was commissioned by Bates Dance Festival, Dance Place (Washington, DC), Highways Performance Space (Los Angeles, CA), Maui Arts & Cultural Center (Maui, HI), Seven Stages (Atlanta, GA), and the Queer Cultural Center (San Francisco, CA).

=== The Lost Art Of Dreaming (2022) ===
"The Lost Art Of Dreaming" premiered at San Francisco's Z Space theater in November 2022. This 70-minute work invites audiences to reconnect with longing, embrace expansive imagination, connect with joy and pleasure, and move toward loving futures.

Critical responses called "The Lost Art Of Dreaming" a "lush meditation on longing, and a raucous, sensual celebration of our right to joy and pleasure … all performed exquisitely by a stellar cast of dancers" (Bay Times) and "expressive dancers, spectacular couture costumes and an uninhibited, enthusiastic embrace of joy" (KQED).

The work is performed by the 5 dancer-performers of Sean Dorsey Dance (Sean Dorsey, Brandon Graham, Héctor Jaime, David Le, and Nol Simonse, with original music composed by: Jesse Olsen Bay, Anomie Belle, LD Brown, Frida Ibarra, Alex Kelly, Ben Kessler and Kelsey Lu. "The Lost Art Of Dreaming" features intricate, elaborate costumes by Costume Designers Tiffany Amundson, Krystal Harfert and Melissa Castaneda. The work's Technical Director is Emily Paulson, and Lighting Designer is Clyde Sheets.

"The Lost Art Of Dreaming" utilizes Dorsey's signature mix of contemporary dance, storytelling, queer partnering, dialogue and monologues and humor. The work also represents a new creative direction for Dorsey: "[The Lost Art Of Dreaming] marks a major shift in Dorsey’s art. His four previous works, each two or three years in the making, have combined dance, music and storytelling to preserve LGBTQ history and illuminate the past, drawing on archival research and oral histories. Along the way, the 50-year-old himself made history, winning five Isadora Duncan Dance Awards, a Dance/USA Artist Fellowship and seven National Endowment for the Arts grants, in addition to becoming the first transgender artist to grace the cover of Dance Magazine. Now, for the first time, his dance is looking to the future." (SF Chronicle)

Dorsey describes "The Lost Art Of Dreaming" as a multi-year project that includes a 70-minute dance-theater work for stage, and also includes other community activities and online resources, including The Futurist Pledge, The Dictionary Of Joy and Pleasure, Postcards From The Future, and a Spell/Incantation to Dream), a series of dance films, and DREAM LABS (creative workshops for trans and LGBTQI+ and allied communities).

"The Lost Art Of Dreaming" was commissioned by American Dance Festival, Dance Place (Washington DC), 7 Stages (Atlanta GA), Velocity Dance Center (Seattle WA), Queer Cultural Center (San Francisco CA), and Yerba Buena Gardens Festival; and developed through residencies with the National Choreography Center in Akron (Akron OH).

=== Other choreographic and film works ===
Other choreographic works by Sean Dorsey include My Unmistakable Chosen (2001), A Small Class of Words (2002), Hero (2003), Reply Here (2012) and choreography for a music video by Anohni that was directed by The Wachowskis (2008).

Dorsey is also a dance filmmaker, and created a series of 9 dance films as part of his project 'The Lost Art Of Dreaming'. These films featured Sean Dorsey and Sean Dorsey Dance company dancers in outdoors locations around the San Francisco Bay Area. Three films in the series (AT WATER'S EDGE, PLACE/PORTAL and SEEK/AFTER) continue to screen at national and international film festivals.

== Activism ==
Dorsey's works reflect on transgender and LGBTQ themes while challenging social norms. His works are largely an example of embracing one's sexuality, gender, and body through dance. Dorsey is called a "pioneer in dance," for "bringing transgender issues and bodies alongside others to the stage in humane, poignant, visually stunning, and often funny ways."

Many of Dorsey's dance pieces use archival information, giving a historical and biographical component to his art. His combination of archival practice, artistic collaboration, and grassroots activism, make his performances sites for historical production. Transgender issues are markedly underrepresented in art and media, and when they are presented it is usually by cisgendered individuals. Academic Jess O'Rear has stated that as a transgender person making transgender art, Dorsey's work has helped refute harmful tropes and stereotypes. Critical reviews of his work highlight the tensions and intersections between transgender issues and other queer issues that Dorsey's work explores. Other critics emphasize how he provides an example of the power of art for people undergoing transitions, changes, or traumas and the revolutionary and liberatory possibilities of "finding joy through queer and transgender bodies and experiences, ultimately asserting the value of these lives through their celebratory presence in performance."

Dorsey is a longtime advocate for Trans Equity in the dance field. Dorsey is the founder and Artistic Director of the trans arts non-profit Fresh Meat Productions. Fresh Meat Productions invests in the creative expression and cultural leadership of transgender and gender-nonconforming communities. The organization creates and commissions new work, presents performing arts programs, conducts education and engagement, and advocates for justice and equity in the Arts. Dorsey directs Fresh Meat's national education and advocacy program TRANSform Dance.

== Awards, achievements and recognition ==
Sean Dorsey Dance was named "San Francisco's Best Dance Company" by SF Weekly and one of the nation's "Top 25 to Watch" by Dance Magazine. Sean Dorsey has won five Isadora Duncan Dance Awards and the Goldie Award for Performance.

Dorsey has been awarded many major commissions: National Dance Project / New England Foundation for the Arts, National Performance Network, Creative Work Fund, Wallace Alexander Gerbode Foundation, William and Flora Hewlett Foundation, San Francisco Arts Commission, Queer Cultural Center (San Francisco), American Dance Festival (Durham), The Theater Offensive (Boston), Links Hall (Chicago), Bates Dance Festival (Lewiston), Dance Place (Washington DC), 7 Stages (Atlanta), Highways Performance Space (Los Angeles), Maui Arts & Cultural Center (Maui), and Velocity Dance Center (Seattle). "Dorsey has been profiled on PBS-TV, NBC-TV, NPR-radio, KQED, BalletTanz, Time Out New York, Dance Magazine, American Theater Magazine, OUT Magazine, The Advocate, San Francisco Magazine, San Francisco Chronicle, SF Weekly, LA Weekly, Miami Herald, Chicago’s Windy City Times, Boston’s Bay Windows, New York’s Dance Insider, Philadelphia Dance Journal, San Antonio Current, Curve Magazine and many other publications."

In June 2018, Dorsey became the first-ever US transgender artist to be presented at The Joyce Theater in New York, NY.

In November 2019, Dorsey became the first-ever openly-transgender person on the cover of Dance Magazine. Also in 2019, Dorsey was awarded an inaugural Dance/USA Artist Fellowship.

In 2020, Dorsey was named a Doris Duke Artist in dance.

In 2023, Dorsey was awarded an Emmy Award for his collaboration and choreography on the short film "Sean Dorsey Dance: Dreaming Trans and Queer Futures," produced by KQED for its series 'If Cities Could Dance'. The short was Directed by Lindsay Gauther, Produced by Kelly Whalen and Masha Pershay, with Cinematography by Elie M. Khadra, and has screened at more than 20 international film festivals.
