= Cuushe =

Japanese singer-songwriter and record producer

- Birth name: Mayuko Hitotsuyanagi
- Origin: Kyoto, Japan
- Genres: Dream pop
- Occupations: Singer-songwriter; multi-instrumentalist; record producer
- Years active: 2010–present
- Labels: Flau; Cascine
- Website: www.cuushe.net

Mayuko Hitotsuyanagi, better known by her stage name Cuushe, is a Japanese singer-songwriter, multi-instrumentalist, and record producer from Kyoto. She is based in Tokyo. She is one half of the duo Neon Cloud along with Geskia. Her music has been released on Flau and Cascine.

== Biography ==
Growing up in Kyoto, Cuushe spent time in Osaka before moving to Tokyo. She also spent extended periods of time in London and Berlin. She started making music in 2008.

Her debut studio album, Red Rocket Telepathy, was released in 2009. In 2012, she released an EP, Girl You Know That I Am Here but the Dream. Her second studio album, Butterfly Case, was released in 2013. Patrick St. Michel of Pitchfork called it "a captivating collection of dream pop." In 2015, she released an EP, Night Lines. "We Can't Stop", a song from the EP, was used in the American dark comedy television series Search Party.

In 2017, she became a victim of stalking and online sexual harassment by the glitch musician Ametsub, who broke into her house and stole her unreleased recordings, musical equipment, and personal items such as clothes and photographs.

== Style and influences ==
In a 2012 interview with Dazed, Cuushe cited "musician friends, movies, [and] sadness" as her top 3 musical inspirations.

Colin Joyce of Pitchfork wrote, "The wispy-voiced Tokyo songwriter is nominally a dream-pop act, indulgent in the stirring static and hushed whispers that have become requisite for the genre."

== Discography ==
=== Studio albums ===
- Red Rocket Telepathy (2009)
- Butterfly Case (2013)
- Waken (2020)

=== EPs ===
- Knit (2011) (with Geskia, as Neon Cloud)
- Girl You Know That I Am Here but the Dream (2012)
- Scar (2014) (with Geskia, as Neon Cloud)
- Night Lines (2015)

=== Singles ===
- "Light" (2020) (with Evan Dorrian, as FEM)

=== Guest appearances ===
- Iglooghost - "Gold Coat" from Chinese Nü Yr (2015)
- Iglooghost - "Infinite Mint" from Neō Wax Bloom (2017)
- Anomie Belle - "Unwind (Cuushe Remix)" from Flux Remixed (2018)
