= Gloo =

British electronic music group

Background information
- Genres: Glitch-pop, footwork, experimental pop
- Years active: 2018–present (as label); 2019–present (as musical project)
- Members: Iglooghost; Kai Whiston; BABii

Gloo (sometimes stylized in all caps as GLOO) is an English electronic music group composed of musicians Iglooghost, Kai Whiston, and BABii. The trio released their debut album, XYZ in 2019. Gloo is also the name of the label which the three artists have self-released some of their solo projects under.

== History ==
The trio are all musicians and frequent collaborators from the United Kingdom. Iglooghost and Whiston are long-time friends from Shaftesbury, although Whiston initially disliked Iglooghost's "faux-FlyLo beats." BABii hails from Margate, where she played a show together with Iglooghost. As the two familiarized themselves with each other, BABii gave vocal stems to Iglooghost and would feature on several tracks on his 2018 Clear Tamei and Steel Mogu EPs. The two EPs were companion pieces released through Gloo. BABii then met Whiston at a festival. She also designed machines that gave fans rewards during an Iglooghost and Kai Whiston tour.

In 2018, Whiston described Gloo as an open and loosely defined creative concept, telling Paper in an interview:

The definition is intentionally vague but it's not so much an imprint or label or distribution or anything. I guess you could say it's like an umbrella term that we use for things of product variety. Think like, Donda by Kanye but just fun creative shit. If Iglooghost decides he wants to build and sell furniture, he'll do it under GLOO. If I wanna sponsor a wrestling tournament, I'll do it under GLOO.

Whiston's 2018 album Kai Whiston Bitch was the first project to be made after Iglooghost and Whiston formally teamed up, and the trio formed in earnest in 2019. The group's sound has been described as diverse and frenetic; their music incorporates elements of grime, synth-pop, and bass, among other genres.

They released their first track, titled "Lamb", on 28 August 2019. On 18 September 2019, the group's debut studio album XYZ was released. The album received positive critical reception. Max Cussons of Contactmusic.com wrote that the album "saw the three bring out the best in each other across several future-fusion tracks, with Whiston bringing a lot of the muscle and spunk." In his 4.5 out of 5 star review of the album, Cussons called the group "three bright rays of hope in UK electronic music."

== Discography ==
=== Studio albums as Gloo ===
Title	Album details
XYZ	Released: 18 September 2019; Format: CD, streaming audio

=== Studio albums released through Gloo label ===
Title	Album details
Lei Line Eon (by Iglooghost)	Released: 2 April 2021; Format: LP, streaming audio
MiiRROR (by BABii)	Released: 21 May 2021; Format: LP, CD, streaming audio
SCREAMER (by BABii)	Released: 27 July 2022; Format: LP, streaming audio
SCREAMER_edit_Vii (by BABii)	Released: 13 January 2023; Format: streaming audio

=== EPs released through Gloo label ===
Title	Album details
Clear Tamei (by Iglooghost)	Released: 8 August 2018; Format: LP, streaming audio
Steel Mogu (by Iglooghost)	Released: 8 August 2018; Format: LP, streaming audio
Kai Whiston Bitch (by Kai Whiston)	Released: 23 November 2018; Format: LP, streaming audio, cassette tape
iii+ (by BABii)	Released: 7 May 2020; Format: LP, streaming audio, cassette tape
