= Good Like That =

Good Like That may refer to:

- "Good Like That", song by Kylie Minogue from Fever
- "Good Like That", song by Yppah from You Are Beautiful at All Times
