= Babble =

Babble may refer to:

- Babble (That Petrol Emotion album), 1987 album by That Petrol Emotion
- Babble, 1979 album by Kevin Coyne and Dagmar Krause
- Babble (band), a later incarnation of the Thompson Twins
- Babble (company), a British internet technology company
- Babbling, a stage in child language acquisition
- Babble.com, online magazine
- Doctor Babble, the baby version of Doctor Eggman, from New Yoke City, in Sonic Prime

== See also ==
- Babel (disambiguation)
- Babbel, an online language learning platform
- Babol, a city in Iran
- Bable, an alternative name of the Asturian language of Spain
