= Clear Tamei =

EP by Iglooghost
- Released: 8 August 2018
- Genres: Wonky; bass; glitch hop; drill 'n' bass; experimental; electronic
- Label: Brainfeeder
- Producer: Seamus Malliagh

Iglooghost chronology
Neō Wax Bloom (2017)	Clear Tamei (2018)	Steel Mogu (2018)

Clear Tamei is an extended play (EP) by producer Seamus Malliagh, known by his stage name Iglooghost, released on the Brainfeeder label on 8 August 2018. It is the first of two EPs released by Malliagh, the second being Steel Mogu.

The EP, especially the title track, notably contains lyrics rapped and chanted in an as-yet-unnamed constructed language developed by Malliagh, described by Jay Balfour writing for Pitchfork as "mumbled gibberish".

== Background ==
Clear Tamei was first teased by Malliagh on his Twitter account, announcing that new music would be coming soon since his 2017 release Neō Wax Bloom.

On 27 June, Brainfeeder, the label who released Neō Wax Bloom, confirmed they would be releasing the two EPs Clear Tamei and Steel Mogu on 8 August 2018.

On 12 July, Malliagh released the music video for the title track to Clear Tamei.

== Track listing ==
No.	Title	Length
1.	"Påleo Mamu"	0:39
2.	"New Vectors"	3:32
3.	"Clear Tamei"	4:22
4.	"Namā"	4:05
5.	"Shrine Hacker" (featuring Babii)	7:45
