= Chinese Nü Yr =

EP by Iglooghost
- Released: 30 October 2015
- Genres: Experimental; electronic; wonky
- Length: 16:20
- Label: Brainfeeder
- Producer: Iglooghost

Iglooghost chronology
Treetunnels (2014)	Chinese Nü Yr (2015)	Milk Empire (2015)

Chinese Nü Yr is an extended play (EP) by producer Seamus Malliagh, known by his stage name Iglooghost, released on the Brainfeeder label on 30 October 2015. Containing elements of footwork, bass, grime and 2-step garage, the EP's sound is represented by a worm who goes through several nonsensical lands. To make Chinese Nü Yr, Malliagh first designed the cover art and then developed songs with structures and sound to fit the artwork. Upon release, the EP garnered generally favorable reviews from critics, a common praise being its unique style.

== Composition ==
Chinese Nü Yr is an electronica album using elements of bass, grime and 2-step garage. Malliagh explained that Chinese Nü Yr is based on a story about 'Xiāngjiāo', a gelatinous and amorphous worm who wears a witch hat and is voiced by heavily pitch-shifted and processed recordings of his father and little sister. Xiāngjiāo is forced to go through portals in colorful and nonsensical lands, having to dodge things such as peanuts, floating fruit, pink-colored fog, and mountains growing out of the ground. Xiāngjiāo fears both the unfamiliarity of future lands and the extreme speed at which it travels.

Malliagh described writing the EP's story as if he was scoring a film, first making the cover art for the EP, and then coming up with the structures and sounds of the songs to fit it. He said in an interview with LA Weekly that "Marrying music and pictures is the funnest thing ever. There's so many subconscious elements at play. Looking at a 'mega-sick' picture can make even the most crappy, uncool song sound awesome. Art has this incredible way of subconsciously enhancing music."

== Tracks ==
Chinese Nü Yr's first two tracks, "Xiangjiao" and "Mametchi / Usohachi", were compared by Resident Advisor journalist Andrew Ryce to the works of labels PC Music and Noumenal Loom; his reason of the comparison for the former song was due to its "mush-mouthed vocals" and trance music sounds, the hip-hop and uptempo "speedy chop-up" of the latter for its vocals reminiscent of the song "Hard" by English producer Sophie. "Mametchi / Usohachi" ends with a rap verse from Japanese singer and producer Mr. Yote, whom Iglooghost said had "amazing taste in melodies" and that her work "sounds wide-eyed and childlike but is also introspective, like a genius baby." "Gold Coat" is the least frantic of all of the EP's four tracks, and Ryce also called it his least favorite of the songs: "Mal's strength comes from deftly juggling ideas, so "Gold Coat"'s dubstep-tempo diversion feels like a regression." "Peach Rift", the heaviest-sounding and longest cut on the EP at over five minutes, was described by Ryce as a "Rubik's Cube of heavy basslines, chirpy synths, and chattering vocals that never quite line up, which can be numbing by the end."

== Release and reception ==
"Gold Coat" was Chinese Nü Yr's lead single, released on 7 October 2015. Six days later, the label Brainfeeder announced they would release the EP on 30 October 2015. Two days before the release of the EP, the music blog Pigeons & Planes premiered "Xiangjiao". Iglooghost said the name of the record came from looking at the sky while flying back home from his gig in Rome: "The sky looked really weird and for some reason the word Chinese New Year came into my head. I was really happy, because everything seemed super cool, life just seemed really warm and nice. I think the word Chinese New Year sounds warm and cool. I imagine fireworks, red colours and Chinese lanterns.” Upon its distribution, Chinese Nü Yr garnered positive reviews. Gary Suarez, reviewing for The Quietus, spotlighted the EP's "mirthfully manic synthesis of garage, hip-hop, footwork, and as-yet undefined (sub)genres" that "makes him a beatmaker to watch." Both Ryce and Exclaim! critic Ashley Hampson praised Malliagh for making such a unique record while still fitting with the works of other acts on the Brainfeeder label.

== Track listing ==
No.	Title	Length
1.	"Xiangjiao"	2:52
2.	"Mametchi / Usohachi" (featuring Mr. Yote)	3:39
3.	"Gold Coat" (featuring Cuushe)	4:20
4.	"Peach Rift"	5:29
Total length:		16:20
