= Babel (surname) =

Babel is a surname. Notable people with the surname include:

- Balázs Bábel (born 1950), Hungarian Roman Catholic archbishop
- Günther Babel (born 1952), German politician
- Isaac Babel (1894–1940), Soviet journalist, playwright, and short story writer
- Johann Baptist Babel (1716–1799), Swiss sculptor
- Louis Babel (1826–1912), Oblate priest
- Meike Babel (born 1974), German tennis champion
- Pierre-Edmé Babel (1720–1775), French engraver
- Ryan Babel (born 1986), Dutch footballer

== See also ==
- Babel (disambiguation)
