= Mark Demsteader =

British artist

Mark Demsteader (born 1963) is a British figurative artist. According to The Daily Telegraph, he is "one of Britain's best-selling figurative painters".

In 2024 Cheshire Art Gallery held the long awaited Moorland Exhibition & published a book about the life & art of Mark Demsteader titled Moorland, (Author Nick Brown OBE) Cheshire Art gallery also produced an accompanying film about Mark Demsteader. (Created by the award winning film maker Gaius Brown)

He has held an annual solo exhibition with Panter & Hall in the West End of London since 2004. He is now represented in Daikanyama, Japan by Art Obsession.

Notably, he produced a surreal portrait of musician Anomie Belle for her album Flux, and 34 paintings of Harry Potter actress Emma Watson.
