= Cold Mission =

Studio album by Logos
- Released: 18 November 2013
- Genre: Weightless grime; bass music; experimental; electronic; grime; ambient
- Length: 42:43
- Label: Keysound
- Producer: James Parker

Cold Mission is the debut studio album by British electronic producer James Parker, who goes by the stage name Logos. It was released on 18 November 2013 on Keysound Recordings and was released to high critical acclaim from various critics.

== Background ==
On discussing Cold Mission, Parker noted that his style of music at the time did not completely represent grime music, especially with him not being 'a 'full grime' producer', but instead utilized it as a major starting point for his own style of abstract bass music. As well as his attempts at becoming 'a non-overly fussy producer', Parker also said he was looking to make his music present 'sounds and space', 'allowing the music to develop in a way that isn't necessarily that obvious to the listener'. Cold Mission musically features influences from ballroom house and 90s rave music, as well as taking its sound palette from ambient music, trap music and electronic music played on UK pirate radio stations, while Parker himself has expressed his unconventional use of minimalist influences.

One of my big influences in music is minimalism in the classical world - people like Steve Reich or Philip Glass - and minimalism can mean different things. It can be about having a lot of material, of information, and presenting it in a way that doesn't move in a normal, Western music way; or it can mean simply not very many elements. I feel like I did both those things on some of the tracks...

== Reception ==
Professional ratings
Review scores
Source	Rating
Pitchfork Media	8.1/10
Resident Advisor	4.5/5 marks

Kevin Lozano of Pitchfork positively noted Parker's continuation and evolution of his grime-based sound palette, citing his 2010 EP Kowloon as being followed 'in its ultra-minimalist deployment of grime signifiers'. As well as this, Lozano compared the atmosphere of Cold Mission to the 'rainswept urban dystopias' featured in the 1982 tech noir film Blade Runner, equally citing Vangelis' soundtrack for the film; he described it in the context of Cold Mission as being 'channeled through the Akai samplers of countless jungle producers'.

== Track listing ==
No.	Title	Length
1.	"Ex 101"	3:10
2.	"Statis Jam"	3:17
3.	"Surface Area (Main Mix)"	3:30
4.	"Swarming (ft. Rabit)"	3:20
5.	"Seawolf"	3:52
6.	"Alien Shapes (ft. Dusk + Blackdown)"	4:32
7.	"Menace"	3:59
8.	"Cold Mission"	3:28
9.	"E3 Night Flight"	3:53
10.	"Wut It Do (ft. Mumdance)"	5:23
11.	"Atlanta 96 (Limitless Mix)"	4:19
