= Redd Walitzki =

American artist

- Born: September 20, 1985 (age 40); Seattle, WA
- Occupation: Artist
- Website: www.reddwalitzki.com

Redd Walitzki (born September 20, 1985) is a Seattle-based contemporary artist. They previously lived in Burghausen, Germany. Walitzki creates mixed-media paintings by combining acrylic, watercolor and oil glazes on laser cut wood canvases, influenced by the Rococo ornamentation of Bavaria. Walitzki's paintings are primarily figurative, most often depicting the female form and detailed natural elements, focusing on the balance between the inevitable entropy of nature, and the unattainable beauty invented through high fashion and technology. Notably, Redd created a surreal portrait of musician Anomie Belle for the cover of the album, Flux.

Walitzki's work is considered Pop-Surrealism. Redd received a bachelor’s in fine arts degree in painting from Cornish College of the Arts.
