= Lei Line Eon =

Studio album by Iglooghost
- Released: 2 April 2021
- Genres: UK bass, chamber music
- Length: 42:15
- Label: Gloo

Iglooghost chronology
| XYZ (2019) | Lei Line Eon (2021) | Tidal Memory Exo (2024) |

Singles from Lei Line Eon
- 1. "Sylph Fossil" Released: 4 February 2021

Lei Line Eon is the second studio album by English electronic music producer Iglooghost, released 2 April 2021 via Gloo.

== Reception ==
Lei Line Eon ratings
Aggregate scores
| Source | Rating |
|---|---|
| AnyDecentMusic? | 7.5/10 |
| Metacritic | 79/100 |
Review scores
| Source | Rating |
| Beats Per Minute | 81% |
| Clash | 8/10 |
| God Is in the TV | 6/10 |
| The Guardian | 3/5 stars |
| The Line of Best Fit | 9/10 |
| Loud and Quiet | 8/10 |
| MusicOMH | 4.5/5 stars |

According to the review aggregator Metacritic, Lei Line Eon received "generally favorable reviews" based on a weighted average score of 79 out of 100 from 6 critic scores.

=== Year-end lists ===
Lei Line Eon year-end lists
| Publication | # | Ref. |
|---|---|---|
| Loud and Quiet | 18 | |

== Track listing ==
All tracks are written by Seamus Rawles Malliagh except where noted. All tracks are produced by Iglooghost.

Lei Line Eon track listing
| No. | Title | Writer(s) | Length |
|---|---|---|---|
| 1. | "Eœ (Disk•Initiate)" | | 2:59 |
| 2. | "Pure Grey Circle" | | 4:19 |
| 3. | "Sylph Fossil" | | 5:30 |
| 4. | "Light Gutter" (feat. Lola) | Malliagh, Lola | 4:04 |
| 5. | "Big Protector" | | 3:59 |
| 6. | "UI Birth" (feat. BABii) | Malliagh, Daisy Emily Warne | 3:37 |
| 7. | "Zones U Can't See" | | 4:21 |
| 8. | "Amu (Disk•Mod)" | | 3:43 |
| 9. | "Soil Bolt" | | 3:59 |
| 10. | "Yellow Umbra" | | 5:39 |
