= Marco Mazzoni =

Italian artist

Marco Mazzoni (born 17 January 1982) is a Milan-based Italian artist, originally from Tortona. He is generally considered a portrait artist and only uses coloured pencils in his work. Mazzoni's work holds a strong interest in flora and fauna, and often depicts the female herbalists of 16th—18th Century Sardinia. Notably, Marco created a portrait of musician Anomie Belle included in the album art for Flux, and as the cover of The Good Life EP.

Mazzoni received a bachelor's degree in painting from Brera Art Academy in Milan. His work has been exhibited in galleries throughout Europe and the United States.

== Publications ==
- Journeaux Troublés, Soleil Productions, 2020
- Poucette, Albin Michel, 2018
