= Tidal Memory Exo =

2024 studio album by Iglooghost

Studio album by Iglooghost
- Released: May 10, 2024
- Genres: Club; UK garage; coldwave; drill
- Length: 42:51
- Label: LuckyMe
- Producer: Iglooghost

Iglooghost chronology
Lei Line Eon (2021)	Tidal Memory Exo (2024)

Singles from Tidal Memory Exo
- 1. "Coral Mimic" Released: March 15, 2024; 2. "New Species" Released: April 26, 2024

Tidal Memory Exo ratings
Aggregate scores
Source	Rating
Metacritic	77/100
Review scores
Source	Rating
The Line of Best Fit	7/10
Resident Advisor	favorable
Slant Magazine	3.5/5 stars
Sputnikmusic	3.8/5

Tidal Memory Exo is the third studio album by English electronic music producer Iglooghost, released May 10, 2024 via LuckyMe. It was preceded by the singles "Coral Mimic" and "New Species," released on and March 15 and April 26 respectively.

== Reception ==
According to review aggregation site Metacritic, the album has an average score of 77/100 based on 4 reviews, indicating "generally favorable reviews". Tom Gledhill of Resident Advisor was positive towards the record, stating that the record "splays UK garage, coldwave and drill across an eclectic collection of catchy vocal tracks that fall into one another like overlapping waves". They also praised the vocals on the record, believing that "Iglooghost's breathy, blown-out vocals slot seamlessly into the music". Overall, believing that the record was a " dense, longform piece of near-future sci-fi that clothes abstract storytelling in visceral, goosebump-inducing club music".

Paul Attard of Slant also praised the record, stating that it "deviates from the intricate world-building that characterized his past work, opting instead for relentless sonic maximalism". Elaborating on this, they explained that "Malliagh’s music is characterized by quick tempos and an eclectic mix of instruments—cellos, mallets, flutes, kotos, and drums—but it’s rarely overwhelming. This is due to his meticulous sonic layering and dynamic sense of compositional structure, imbuing his songs with a playful sense of improvisation". They also praised the vocals, noting the greater prominence of them than on previous projects. Overall, they gave it a 3.5/5 stating that "while it lacks the cohesion and tenderness of Lei Line Eon, Tidal Memory Exo largely finds Malliagh confidently carving out his own identity as an electronic music innovator."

=== Year-end lists ===
Select year-end rankings for Tidal Memory Exo
Publication/critic	Accolade	Rank	Ref.
Bleep	Top 10 Albums of 2024	3	

== Track listing ==
All tracks are written by Iglooghost; "Spawn01" written with Cyst.

No.	Title	Length
1.	"Blue Hum"	1:52
2.	"New Species"	3:21
3.	"Alloy Flea"	3:53
4.	"Coral Mimic"	3:26
5.	"Spawn01" (featuring Cyst)	3:33
6.	"Flux•Cocoon" (featuring Oli XL)	3:25
7.	"Pulse Angel"	3:14
8.	"Echo Lace"	3:16
9.	"Nemat0de"	3:03
10.	"Chlorine•FM (Intermission)"	1:39
11.	"Germ Chrism"	4:02
12.	"Dewdrop Signal"	4:05
13.	"Geo Sprite Exo"	4:02
Total length:		42:51

== Personnel ==
- Iglooghost – production
- Cyst – production on "Spawn01"
- Oli XL – additional production and vocals on "Flux•Cocoon"
- SV1 – additional production on "Echo Lace"
- DJH – additional production on "Dewdrop Signal"
- Rocks Foe – additional vocals on "Pulse Angel"
- Jess Gough – additional vocals on "Chlorine•FM"
- Craig Massie – additional vocals on "Chlorine•FM"
- Josh Spencer – additional vocals on "Chlorine•FM"
- Mum – additional vocals on "Chlorine•FM"
- Miles Spilsbury – flute on "Blue Hum"
- Igor Pjörrt – photography
