= D*Note =

- Origin: London, England
- Genres: Electronic
- Years active: 1993–present
- Labels: Dorado Records, Virgin Records
- Members: Matt Winn

D*Note is a British electronic dance music band, founded primarily in London in 1993 by musician Matt Winn (a.k.a. Matt Wienevski, born 20 September 1965). The band emerged with their debut album Babel on Dorado Records, which reflected an acid jazz background.

Alongside Wienevski, D*Note consists of musical friends, including keyboard player Matt Cooper who records with Outside and Incognito, guitarist Keith Osbourne and others. Vocalists have included Beth Hirsch, Pamela Anderson, Ceri Evans of Sunship, Dee Major and more. Other collaborators include scratching from Charlie Lexton as Cool Breeze, rappers Navigator and Krazy Cool D-Zine.

== History ==
The first D*Note album, Babel, was released in 1993. The second D*Note album, Criminal Justice (1995), was released on Dorado Records in the UK and on TVT records in America. Its most well-known track, "The Garden of Earthly Delights", featured the vocals of PY Anderson. Like "D*Votion", the track is an example of ambient music.

Criminal Justice (1995) featured drum and bass rhythms with jazz harmonies, particularly in "Iniquity Worker" and "Criminal Justice", which was remixed by Roni Size and A Guy Called Gerald.

After two albums on Dorado, the band released the eponymous D*Note album on Virgin dance imprint VC (Virgin Club). Featured tracks included "Lost and Found" and "Waiting Hopefully". The soundtrack to the short film, Coming Down, was released in the same year.

Fuchsia Dog, the fifth D*Note album, was released on Channel 4 Records in 2001, along with another film, Out Of The Game, for which it was the soundtrack. "Shed My Skin", a co-composition with Anita Kelsey and featuring her vocals, appeared on over a hundred compilation albums.

The sixth D*Note album, Laguna, featuring Beth Hirsch, was released in 2006 on New World Music. Laguna featured cover versions of songs that figured as key parts of Winn and Hirsch’s musical influences, including "Wichita Lineman" by Jimmy Webb, "Guinnevere" by David Crosby, "Edith and The Kingpin" by Joni Mitchell, and "Being Alive" by Stephen Sondheim.

== Influences ==
Though part of the acid jazz scene of the early 1990s, D*Note was influenced by twentieth century French and English classical music and modal jazz. Influences from the jazz world include Miles Davis, Bill Evans, and Keith Jarrett. Classical influences include Maurice Ravel, whose polytonalities can be heard in D*Note's use of Lydian modes (what are known in the jazz world as “sharp elevens”). Other classical influences are Debussy, Vaughan Williams, and Aaron Copland. Another key influence, who can be heard on "D*Votion" and "Deep Water" on the second album Criminal Justice, is the American minimalist composer Steve Reich. D*Note contributed the "Phased and Konfused" remix to the Steve Reich composition "Piano Phase", featured on the 1999 Reich Remixed album.

== Discography ==
=== Albums ===
- Babel (1993, Dorado)
- Criminal Justice (1995, Dorado)
- D*Note (1997, Virgin Records)
- Coming Down (1997)
- Fuchsia Dog (2002, Channel 4 Music)
- Laguna (2006, New World Music)

=== Singles ===
- "Now's The Time" (1991, Baseline Records)
- "Rain" (1992, Dorado)
- "Scheme of Things" (1992, Dorado)
- "The More I See" (1993, Dorado)
- "The Garden Of Earthly Delights" (1995, Dorado)
- "Kite Hill" (1997, VC Recordings)
- "Waiting Hopefully" (1997, VC Recordings) - UK No. 46
- Lost and Found" (1997, VC Recordings) - UK No. 59
- "Say What You Mean" (1998, VC Recordings)
- "D*Votion 2000" (2000, VC Recordings)
- "Shed My Skin" (2002, NEWS) - UK No. 73
