= Babel fish =

Babel fish may refer to:

- Babel fish, a fictional species in Douglas Adams's The Hitchhiker's Guide to the Galaxy that provides instantaneous language translation; see The Hitchhiker's Guide to the Galaxy
- Babel Fish (band), a Norwegian band
- Yahoo! Babel Fish, a former web translation service

== See also ==
- Babel Fishh, stage name of hip hop artist Scott Huber
- Barbel (fish)
