= Babel, Khuzestan =

Babel بابل
- Village
- Location within Iran
- Coordinates: 31°09′31″N 49°36′41″E
- Country: Iran
- Province: Khuzestan
- County: Ramhormoz
- Bakhsh: Central
- Rural District: Howmeh-ye Sharqi

Population (2006)
  - Total: 175
- Time zone: UTC+3:30 (IRST)
  - Summer (DST): UTC+4:30 (IRDT)

Babel (Persian: بابل, also Romanized as Bābel; also known as Bābol-e Mashūsh) is a village in Howmeh-ye Sharqi Rural District, in the Central District of Ramhormoz County, Khuzestan Province, Iran. At the 2006 census, its population was 175, in 46 families.
