= Babel (D*Note album) =

Studio album by D*Note
- Released: 1993
- Label: Dorado/Virgin
- Producer: Matt Winn, Matt Cooper (co-producer; track 3)

D*Note chronology
Babel (1993)	Criminal Justice (1995)

Babel is the debut 1993 album from D*Note. Four singles were released from the album: "Now Is The Time", "Bronx Bull", "Scheme Of Things", and "The More I See", each receiving good reviews.

== Track listing ==
1. Judgement
2. Babel
3. Now Is The Time
4. Gimme Some Liquor
5. Aria
6. The Mandarin And The Courtesan
7. Rain
8. Bronx Bull
9. Omni
10. The More I See
11. Pharaoh
12. The Message
13. Lydia
14. Scheme Of Things
15. The Death Of Ntela Njonjo 0:45
16. D*Votion
17. God Bless Your South Africa 0:40
