= The Tower of Babel (Bruegel) =

Three paintings by Pieter Bruegel the Elder

The (Great) Tower of Babel
- Artist: Pieter Bruegel the Elder
- Year: c. 1563
- Medium: oil on wood panel
- Dimensions: 114 cm × 155 cm (45 in × 61 in)
- Location: Kunsthistorisches Museum, Vienna

The (Little) Tower of Babel
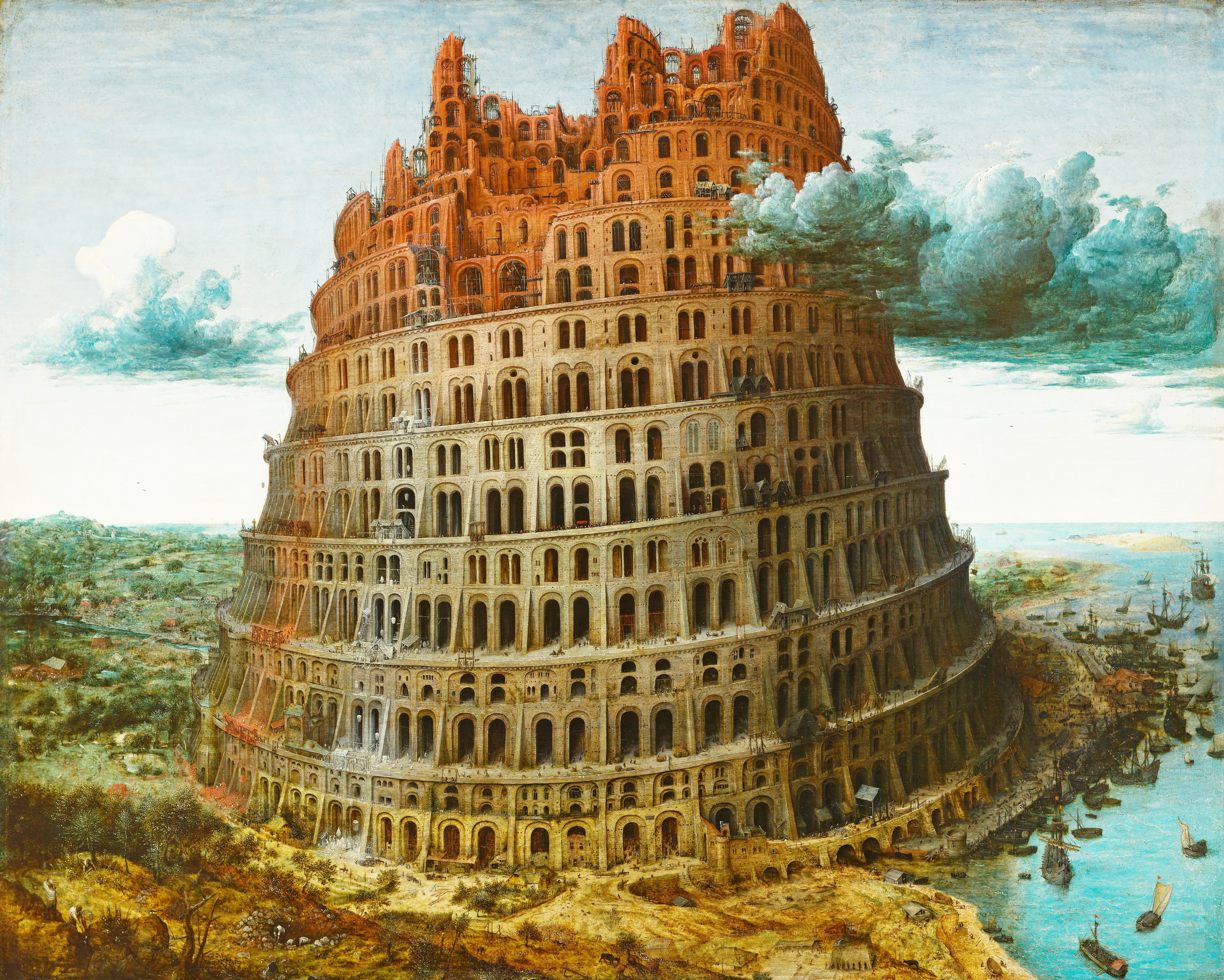
- Artist: Pieter Bruegel the Elder
- Year: c. 1563
- Medium: oil on wood panel
- Dimensions: 60 cm × 74.5 cm (24 in × 29.3 in)
- Location: Museum Boijmans Van Beuningen, Rotterdam

The Tower of Babel was the subject of two surviving paintings and one lost painting by Dutch and Flemish Renaissance painter Pieter Bruegel the Elder. The earliest of the three, a miniature painted on ivory, was completed in 1552–1553 while Bruegel was in Rome, and is now lost. The two surviving works are oil paintings on wood panels, sometimes distinguished by the prefix "Great" and "Little" and by their present location: Kunsthistorisches Museum Wien in Vienna and the latter in the Museum Boijmans Van Beuningen in Rotterdam. The Tower of Babel in Vienna is dated 1563, while the version in Rotterdam is undated but widely believed to have been painted sometime after.

The paintings depict the construction of the Tower of Babel, which, according to the Book of Genesis in the Bible, was built by a unified, monolingual humanity as a mark of their achievement and to prevent their dispersion: "Then they said, 'Come, let us build ourselves a city, and a tower with its top in the heavens, and let us make a name for ourselves; otherwise we shall be scattered abroad upon the face of the whole earth.'" God punishes the builders for their vanity by "confusing their speech" into different languages so that they could no longer communicate; however, in both paintings, Bruegel focuses on the construction of the tower rather than the biblical story as a whole.

The (Little) Tower of Babel in Rotterdam is painted on a canvas of half the width and half the height of The (Great) Tower of Babel in Vienna. The two paintings share the same composition, and modern X-rays reveal that the Tower in Rotterdam initially resembled the one in Vienna even more closely. However, the two paintings differ greatly in specific details, including the architectural style of the towers, the color palette and hues, the progress of the tower's construction, and the human figures in the scene. Most notably, the Vienna version has a group in the foreground, with the main figure presumably Nimrod, who was believed in some Christian traditions to have ordered the construction of the tower.

Bruegel's composition of the Tower of Babel, particularly in the Vienna version, is considered the most famous and widely emulated depiction; both paintings are regarded as among his best works, and are considered exemplars of his characteristically painstaking and "encyclopedic" attention to detail.

== Description and analysis ==
Bruegel's depiction of the architecture of the tower, with its numerous arches and other examples of Roman engineering, is deliberately reminiscent of the Roman Colosseum, which Christians of the time saw as a symbol of both hubris and persecution. Bruegel had visited Rome in 1552–1553. Back in Antwerp, he may have refreshed his memory of Rome with a series of engravings of the principal landmarks of the city made by the publisher of his own prints, Hieronymous Cock, for he incorporated details of Cock's engravings of Roman views in both surviving versions of the Tower of Babel.

The parallel of Rome and Babylon had a particular significance for Bruegel's contemporaries: Rome was the Eternal City, intended by the Caesars to last forever, and its decay and ruin were taken to symbolize the vanity and transience of earthly efforts. The Tower was also symbolic of the religious turmoil between the Catholic Church (which at the time conducted all services in Latin) and the polyglot Protestant religion that was increasingly popular in the Netherlands. The subject may have had a specific topicality, as the famous Polyglot Bible in six languages, a landmark in Biblical scholarship, was published in Antwerp in 1566. Although at first glance the tower appears to be a stable series of concentric pillars, upon closer examination it is apparent that none of the layers lies at a true horizontal. Rather the tower is built as an ascending spiral.

The workers in the painting have built the arches perpendicular to the slanted ground, thereby making them unstable, and a few arches can already be seen crumbling. The foundation and bottom layers of the tower had not been completed before the higher layers were constructed.

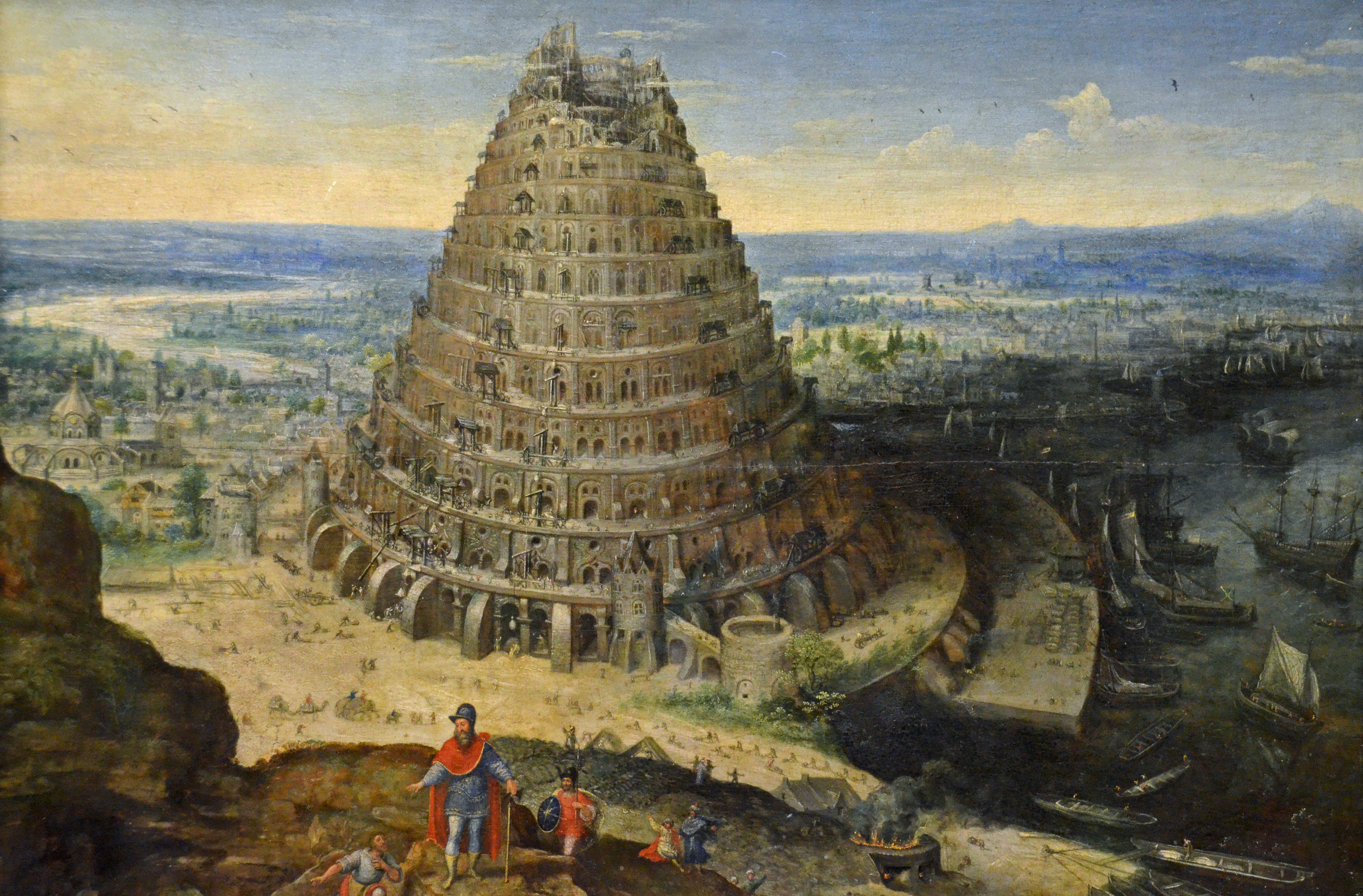
Van Valckenborch's Tower of Babel 1594

Lucas van Valckenborch, a contemporary of Bruegel's, also painted the Tower of Babel in the 1560s and later in his career, possibly after seeing Bruegel's depiction. Both were part of a larger tradition of painting the tower during the 16th and 17th centuries.

Detail at right side, with original rock formation.

The story of the Tower of Babel—like that in The Suicide of Saul, Bruegel's only other painting with an Old Testament subject—was interpreted as an example of pride punished, and that is no doubt what Bruegel intended his painting to illustrate. Moreover, the hectic activity of the engineers, masons and workmen points to a second moral: the futility of much human endeavour. Nimrod's doomed building was used to illustrate this meaning in Sebastian Brant's Ship of Fools. Bruegel's knowledge of building procedures and techniques is considerable and correct in detail. The skill with which he has shown these activities recalls that his last commission, left unfinished at his death, was for a series of documentary paintings recording the digging of a canal linking Brussels and Antwerp.

Both towers are shown partly built with stone facings over a massive brick framework, a typical technique in Roman architecture, used in the Colosseum and other huge Roman buildings. Grand and formal architecture of this sort is not a usual interest of Bruegel in either paintings or drawings, although it was typical subject matter for many of his contemporaries. Nadine Orenstein, in discussing his only known drawing of buildings in Rome, concludes from the details taken from the Colosseum in both Tower paintings that he "must" have recorded them in drawings on his visit ten years before, but given the easy availability of prints this does not seem conclusive.

There are no surviving drawings that are studies for this or any other of Bruegel's paintings. This is despite indications that Bruegel did make use of preparatory studies. Both Tower versions are full of the type of details which are likely to have been worked out in sketches first. Except for a lack of mountains, the paintings contain the main ingredients of the world landscape, a type of composition followed in many of Bruegel's earlier landscapes. The Vienna tower is built around a very steep small mountain, which can be seen protruding from the architecture at the centre near the ground and to the right higher up.

== Provenance ==
On the Vienna painting, there is a stone block directly in front of the king which is signed and dated "Brvegel. FE. M.CCCCC.LXIII" (where Bruegel FE. is short for "Bruegel a fait en", French for "[painted] by Bruegel, in [1563]"). It was painted for the Antwerp banker Nicolaes Jonghelinck, one of Bruegel's best patrons, who owned no fewer than 16 of his paintings.

The Tower in Rotterdam is believed to have once been signed and dated but may have been cropped; most scholars believe that it was painted after the version in Vienna, on or after 1563.

== Gallery of details (Vienna version) ==
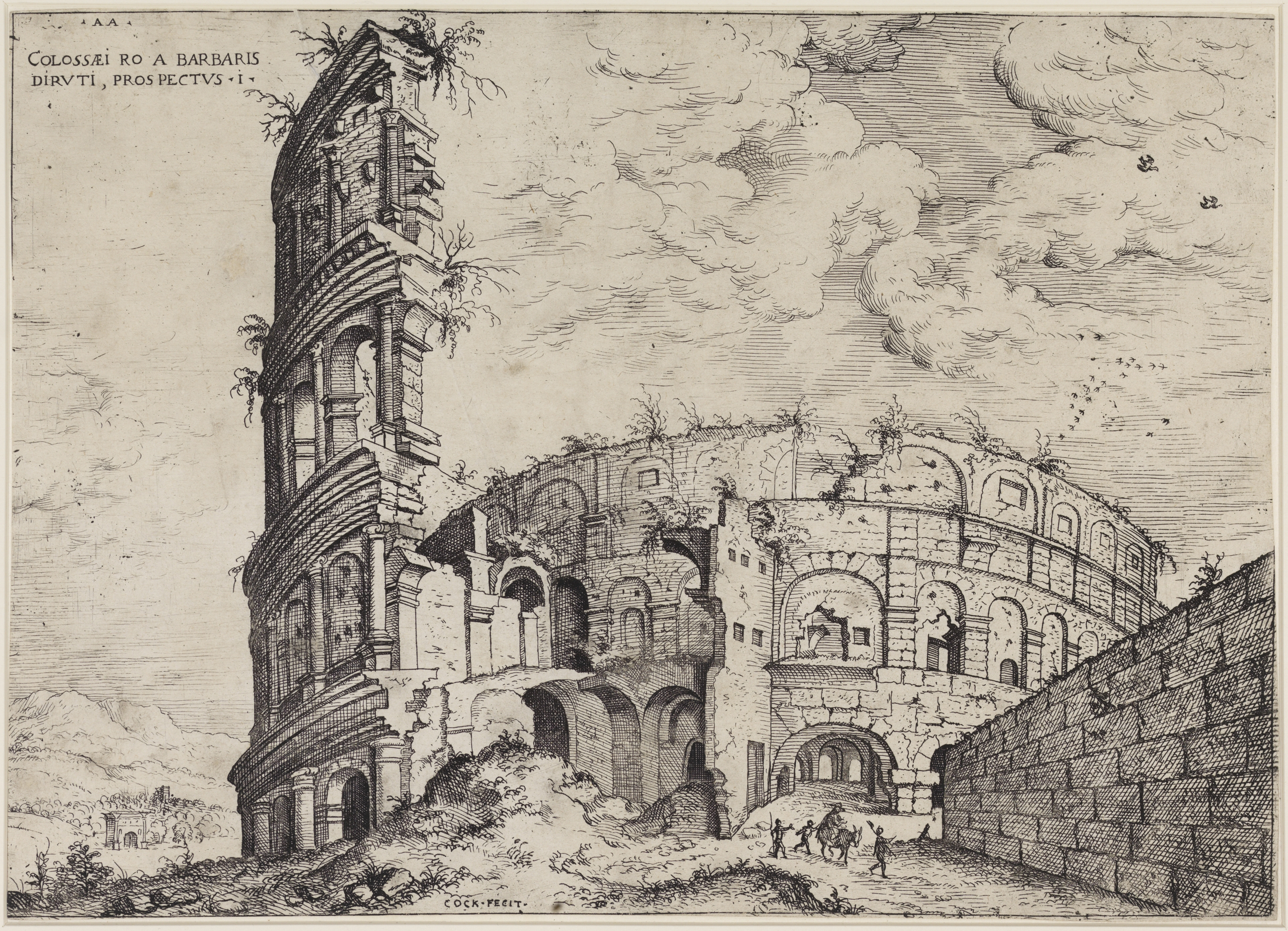
Print of the Colosseum in Rome, published by Hieronymus Cock in 1551

The king and entourage visiting the builders. Bruegel's signature at bottom right.

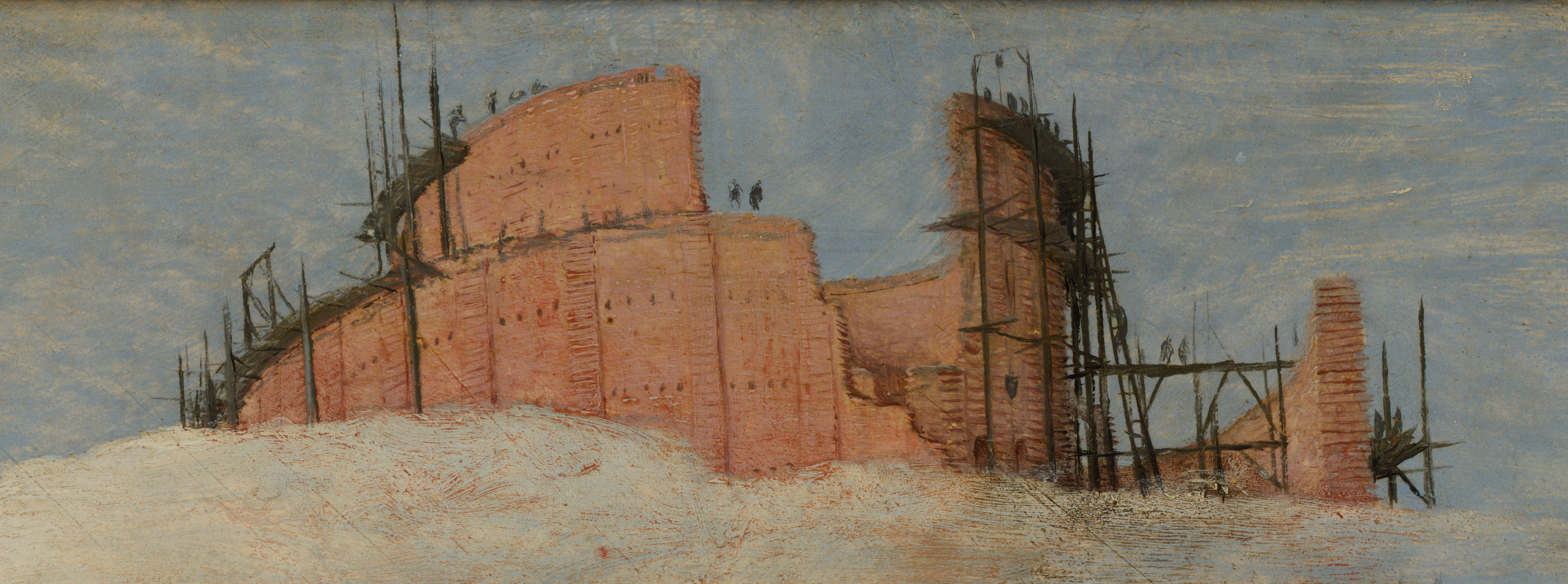
The peak above the clouds

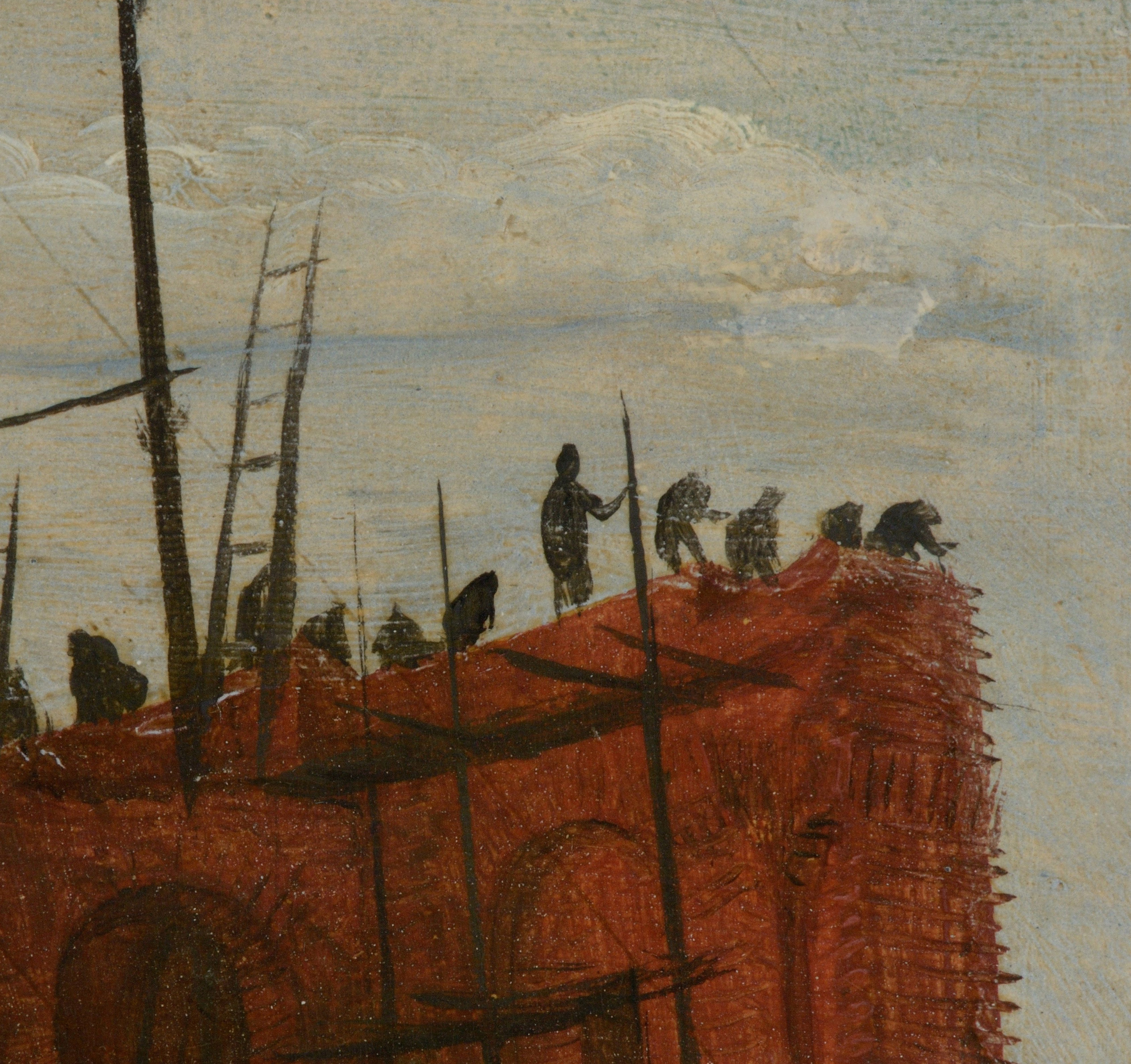
Sillouetted bricklayers at the top level

A crane

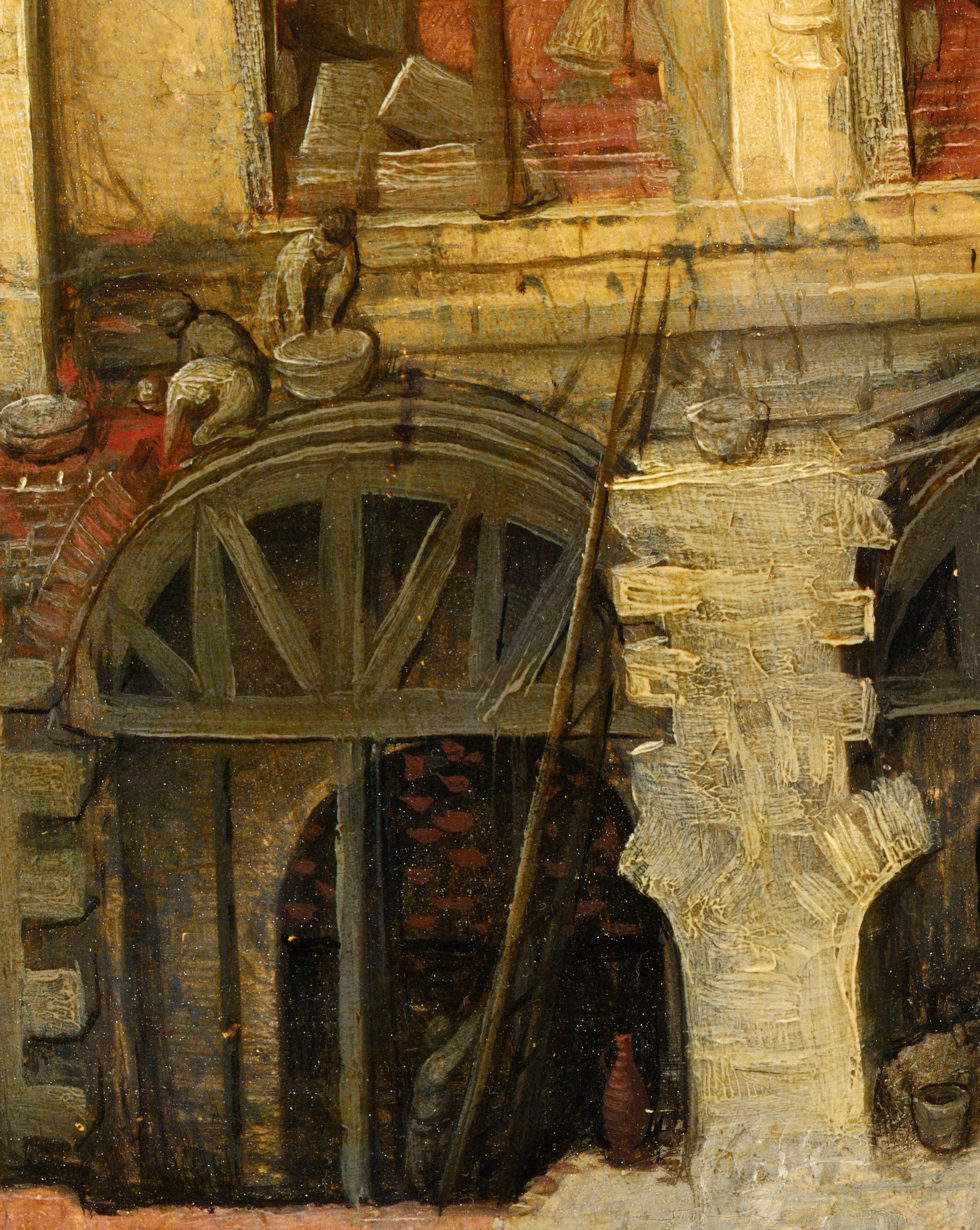
Vault with falsework

External videos
- Bruegel's Tower of Babel, Smarthistory
- The "Little" Tower of Babel, ARTtube Dutch language

== See also ==
- List of paintings by Pieter Bruegel the Elder
- Tower of Babel
- Tower of Babel (M. C. Escher)

== Sources ==
- Orenstein, Nadine M., ed. (2001). Pieter Bruegel the Elder: Drawings and Prints. The Metropolitan Museum of Art. ISBN 9780870999901. (full text free online)
- Snyder, James. Northern Renaissance Art, 1985, Harry N. Abrams, ISBN 0136235964
