= Tower of Babel (M. C. Escher) =

Woodcut by M. C. Escher

- Artist: M. C. Escher
- Year: 1928
- Type: Woodcut
- Dimensions: 62.1 cm × 38.6 cm (24.4 in × 15.2 in)

Tower of Babel is a woodcut print by the Dutch artist M. C. Escher, who created it in 1928, illustrating his early artistic interest in depicting new perspectives and unusual viewpoints in his works.

== Description ==
The woodcut depicts the Tower of Babel, a biblical story about people attempting to build a tower to reach God, which consists of nine verses in Genesis chapter 11 (Escher has selected a particular verse, number 7, which is marked in the corner of the composition). Although Escher later dismissed his works before 1935 as of little or no value as they were "for the most part merely practice exercises," some of them, including the Tower of Babel, chart the development of his interest in perspective and unusual viewpoints that would become the hallmarks of his later, more famous, works, such as Belvedere and Waterfall.

In contrast to many other depictions of the biblical story, such as those by Pieter Brueghel the Elder (The Tower of Babel) and Gustave Doré (The Confusion of Tongues), Escher depicts the tower as a geometrical structure and places the viewpoint above the tower. This allows him to exercise his skill with perspective, but he also chose to centre the picture around the top of the tower as the focus for the climax of the action. He later commented:

Some of the builders are white and others black. The work is at a standstill because they are no longer able to understand one another. Seeing as the climax of the drama takes place at the summit of the tower which is under construction, the building has been shown from above as though from a bird's eye view.

The print is one of the few important artworks which entered the public domain in the United States on 1 January 2024. (Note: In Europe—including Escher's native country of the Netherlands—the copyright will expire in 2043, 70 years after the artist's death.)
