= Fiona Smith =

Fiona Smith may refer to:

- Fiona Lesley Smith (born 1973), Canadian Olympic women's ice hockey player
- Fiona Smith (badminton) (born 1963), English badminton medalist
- Fiona Smith (Church of Scotland), Principal Clerk of the Church's General Assembly from 2022
- Fiona Smith (whipcracker), Australian whipcracking champion

== See also ==
- Fiona Smyth, Canadian cartoonist, illustrator, and comics educator
