= Babel, Carmarthenshire =

Hamlet in Carmarthenshire, Wales

Coordinates: 52.00°N 03.70°W

Babel
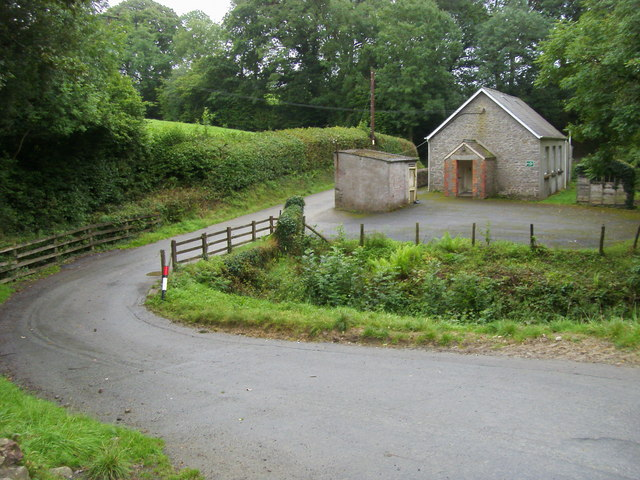
- Village hall

- Location within Carmarthenshire
- OS grid reference: SN8335
- Community: Llanfair-ar-y-bryn
- Principal area: Carmarthenshire
- Country: Wales
- Sovereign state: United Kingdom
- Police: Dyfed-Powys
- Fire: Mid and West Wales
- Ambulance: Welsh
- UK Parliament: Caerfyrddin
- Senedd Cymru – Welsh Parliament: Carmarthen East and Dinefwr

Babel is a hamlet in Carmarthenshire, Wales.
