= Babel (2017 manga) =

Japanese manga series

- First tankōbon volume cover
- Genre: Historical
- Created by: Takizawa Bakin
- Manga
- Written by: Yūgo Ishikawa
- Published by: Shogakukan
- Imprint: Big Superior Comics
- Magazine: Big Comic Superior
- Original run: December 22, 2017 – August 27, 2021
- Volumes: 10
- icon

Babel (stylized in all caps) is a Japanese manga series written and illustrated by Yūgo Ishikawa, based on Takizawa Bakin's novel Nansō Satomi Hakkenden. It was serialized in Shogakukan's seinen manga magazine Big Comic Superior from December 2017 to August 2021, with its chapters collected in ten tankōbon volumes.

== Publication ==
Written and illustrated by Yūgo Ishikawa and based on Takizawa Bakin's novel Nansō Satomi Hakkenden, Babell started in Shogakukan's seinen manga magazine Big Comic Superior on December 22, 2017. From September 13, 2019, the manga was only published in the digital version of the magazine. It finished on August 27, 2021. Shogakukan collected its chapters in ten tankōbon volumes, released from May 30, 2018, to October 29, 2021.

=== Volumes ===
| No. | Japanese release date | Japanese ISBN |
|---|---|---|
| 1 | May 30, 2018 | 978-4-09-189876-0 |
| 2 | October 30, 2018 | 978-4-09-860080-9 |
| 3 | February 28, 2019 | 978-4-09-860228-5 |
| 4 | June 28, 2019 | 978-4-09-860322-0 |
| 5 | December 26, 2019 | 978-4-09-860469-2 |
| 6 | May 29, 2020 | 978-4-09-860622-1 |
| 7 | October 30, 2020 | 978-4-09-860754-9 |
| 8 | March 30, 2021 | 978-4-09-860874-4 |
| 9 | September 30, 2021 | 978-4-09-861151-5 |
| 10 | October 29, 2021 | 978-4-09-861172-0 |
