= Iglooghost =

British electronic music producer

- Born: Seamus Rawles Malliagh; 13 June 1996 (age 30); Shaftesbury, England
- Genres: Electronic; experimental
- Years active: 2014–present
- Labels: Error Broadcast; Activia Benz; Brainfeeder; Gloo; LuckyMe
- Website: iglooghost.net

Seamus Rawles Malliagh (born 13 June 1996), known by his recording alias Iglooghost, is an English electronic music producer and songwriter based in London.

== Career ==
Malliagh released a cassette in 2014 titled Treetunnels on Error Broadcast. In 2015, he released his second EP titled Chinese Nü Yr on Brainfeeder. He also released in that same year a collaborative EP with Mr. Yote titled Milk Empire through Activia Benz. In March 2016, he released his third EP titled Little Grids, again on Brainfeeder, and in September 2017 he released his album Neō Wax Bloom, also on Brainfeeder.

On 4 February 2021 Iglooghost announced the oncoming release of his second album, Lei Line Eon, which was released on 2 April alongside the release of the album's lead single, "Sylph Fossil". As of 27 May 2024 Iglooghost has over 111,000 active monthly listeners on Spotify, and over 30,400 subscribers on YouTube.

On 15 March 2024 Iglooghost announced his third album named Tidal Memory Exo, which was released on 10 May 2024 via LuckyMe, and also released the lead single "Coral Mimic" on streaming services.

== Discography ==
=== Studio albums ===
- Treetunnels (2014, Error Broadcast, limited edition)
- Neō Wax Bloom (2017, Brainfeeder)
- XYZ (2019, Gloo, collaboration with Kai Whiston & BABii)
- Lei Line Eon (2021, Gloo)
- Tidal Memory Exo (2024, LuckyMe)

=== EPs ===
- Chinese Nü Yr (2015, Brainfeeder)
- Milk Empire (2015, Activia Benz, collaboration with Mr. Yote)
- Little Grids (2016, Brainfeeder)
- Clear Tamei (2018, Brainfeeder)
- Steel Mogu (2018, Brainfeeder)
- Amber Eon Micro (2021, Gloo, limited edition)
- Bronze Claw Iso (2025, LuckyMe)

=== Mixtapes ===
- Twenteen (2014, self-published)
- Places U Hide... Sketches (2015, self-published)
- Solar Church (2017, self-published, limited edition)
- Lei Fracture Vault (2020, self-published)
- Lei Disk (2021, Gloo)
