= Babel (magazine) =

Quarterly magazine about languages and linguistics

Babel: The Language Magazine
- Frequency: Quarterly
- First issue: 2012
- Company: Babel: The Language Magazine, Ltd.
- Country: United Kingdom
- Based in: Leeds, West Yorkshire
- Language: English
- Website: www.babelzine.co.uk
- ISSN: 2051-7297
- OCLC: 881446057

Babel: The Language Magazine is a quarterly magazine about language and linguistics. Its aim is to make linguistics and linguistic research accessible to a non-expert audience. The magazine is available in print and digital format and offers individual and institutional subscriptions with international shipping. Its first issue appeared in November 2012.

Babel was founded by the linguistics professors Lesley Jeffries and Dan McIntyre and originally produced from the Department of Linguistics and Modern Languages at the University of Huddersfield, UK. In 2023, Babel became a not-for-profit limited company and is no longer affiliated with any university.

The British linguist David Crystal serves as linguistic consultant and the magazine has been endorsed by the writer, actor and broadcaster Stephen Fry.

== Editorial team ==
Babel's current editorial team is as follows:

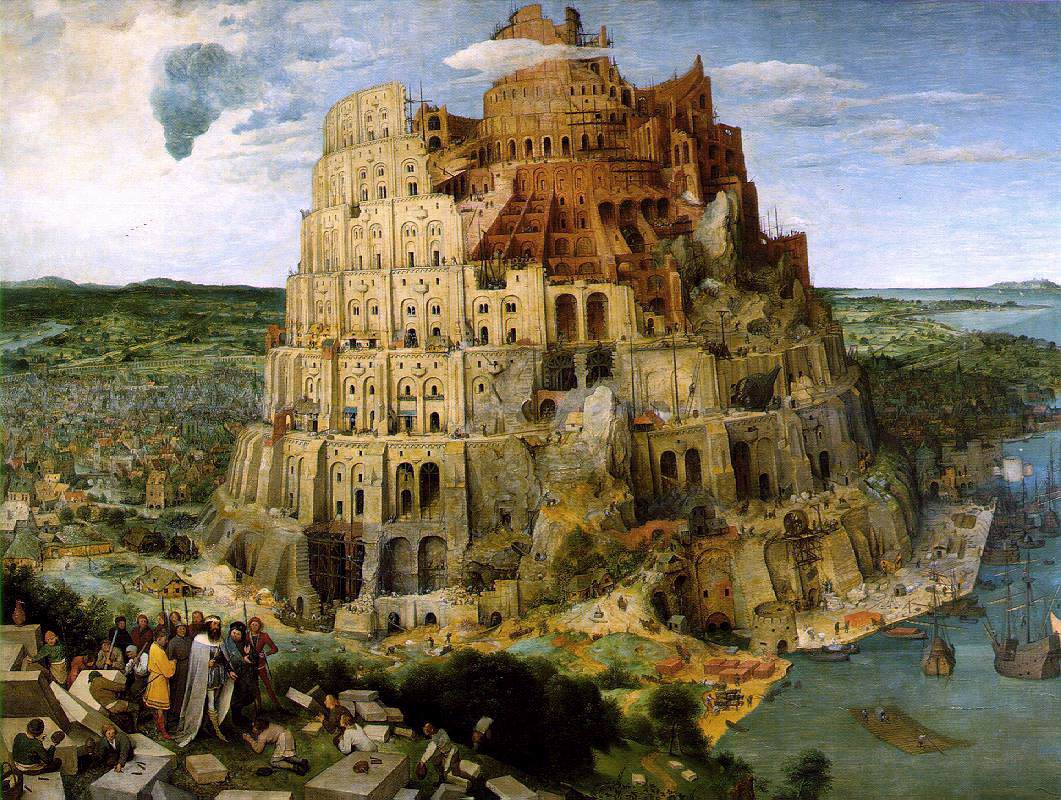
The Tower of Babel, from which comes the inspiration for the name of the magazine

Editors
Lesley Jeffries
Dan McIntyre

Assistant editor
Matthew Evans

Editorial assistants
Hazel Price
Erica Gold
Laura Mills
Jim O'Driscoll

== Babel Lecture ==
Since 2015, Babel has hosted an annual public lecture. The Babel Lecture aims to celebrate the discipline of linguistics, and to enhance public understanding and awareness of this field by providing popular and accessible analysis of language and communication. The list of Babel lectures to date is as follows:

Year	Speaker	Title	Venue
2015	Brendan Gunn	The breath of meaning: Applying linguistics	University of Huddersfield, UK
2016	David Crystal	The English tone of voice	University of Huddersfield, UK
2017	Peter French	Their own tongues speak against them: Phonetics in the criminal justice system	University of Huddersfield, UK
2018	Susie Dent	The -ize have it: The Americanization of English and what we can do about it	University of Huddersfield, UK
2019	Jessica Coon	The linguistics of Arrival: Aliens, fieldwork and Universal Grammar	University of Huddersfield, UK
2020	No lecture, due to Covid-19		
2021	Jean Berko Gleason	The wug test	Online
2022	Stephen Fry	What we have here is a failure to communicate	University of Huddersfield, UK
2023	Robin Ince	Weapons of empathy: How the written word lets us walk in the boots and minds of others	Media City, Salford, UK
2024	Ben Crystal	Original Pronunciation: The sound of Shakespeare	Northumbria University, UK
2025	John Vice	"I don't need a watch to tell me what time it is": Language, truth and parliamentary reporting	University of Kent, UK

== Babel Young Writers' Competition ==
The magazine also organises an annual Young Writer's Competition, for which there are two age groups one can compete in - a 16-18 category and an undergraduate category. Submitted essays may be on any linguistics-related topic, up to 2,500 words in length. Winners of the competition receive a year's subscription to Babel Magazine. The first edition of the competition ran in 2014, and past winners have written on topics such as British Sign Language, Spoonerisms, and language death.
