= Babble (company) =

British internet company

Babble Cloud Limited
- Formerly: IP Solutions UK Limited
- Industry: Technology
- Founded: 2001
- Headquarters: London, United Kingdom
- Key people: Mark Braund (Executive Chair)
- Website: babble.cloud

Babble Cloud is a British internet telephony company headquartered in London with offices across the UK including the North West, Midlands, North East and the South Coast.

In August 2021, Babble acquired Concert (Concert Networks Limited) and 5 Rings (5 Rings Telecom Ltd and 5 Rings IT Ltd). In September 2021, Babble acquired Scottish telecoms firm 8020.

In October 2021, the company acquired Kilmarnock-based Halo Communications and Newcastle-based Digital Communications Systems Ltd (DCS.) In 2020 they acquired Stockport and Ellesmere Port-based IT and telecoms solution provider, Active.

In 2023, Babble announced the triple acquisition of NTE, Talking Technology & Unicomm.
