= You Are Beautiful at All Times =

Studio album by Yppah
- Released: 28 November 2006
- Genre: Electronic
- Length: 37:17
- Label: Ninja Tune

Professional ratings
Review scores
Source	Rating
Allmusic	4.5/5 stars

You Are Beautiful at All Times is the debut album by Yppah, released in 2006 on the Ninja Tune label.

Some of the tracks made it into mainstream culture, as the track "Again with the Subtitles" was featured in the film 21 and the track "It's Not the Same" was featured in the video game Alone in the Dark, as well as in the House episode "Last Resort", all from 2008.

In 2011, the album was also released on vinyl.

== Track listing ==
1. "Ending with You" – 3:10
2. "I'll Hit the Breaks" – 3:06
3. "Again with the Subtitles" – 2:47
4. "The Subtleties That Count" – 2:22
5. "We Aim" – 3:47
6. "What's the Matter?" – 2:23
7. "In Two, the Weakly" – 3:26
8. "Almost in That Category" – 3:49
9. "Good Like That" – 2:36
10. "Cannot See Straight" – 3:30
11. "It's Not the Same" – 2:53
12. "Longtime" – 3:28
