= Gaston Dorren =

Dutch writer

- Born: May 31, 1965; Valkenburg aan de Geul, Netherlands
- Occupations: Language expert, writer, journalist
- Writing career
- Genre: Non-fiction
- Notable works: Lingo (2014); Babel (2018)
- Website: languagewriter.com

Gaston Dorren is a Dutch language expert, journalist, and writer. He was born in Valkenburg aan de Geul, Netherlands and currently resides in Amersfoort, Netherlands with his wife Marleen Bekker. Dorren is a polyglot who is able to speak six different languages and read nine more. Dorren has achieved a modicum of international success, with Lingo being published in 12 different languages and Babel in 15. He also developed an app called The Language Lovers Guide to Europe, but it is no longer available.

Dorren wrote his most recent work, Babel, entirely in both English and Dutch himself. The book was awarded the Dutch Language Book Prize 2019 by the language magazine Onze Taal and the Belgian-Dutch cultural association ANV. His works have received positive reviews from publications such as Kirkus Reviews, The Guardian, The Wall Street Journal, and BBC

== Bibliography ==
This bibliography only covers the books that have been written by Dorren, not the abundance of articles for various blogs, websites and magazines throughout Europe.

Dutch publication		English publication	
Title	Year	Title	Year
		The Game of the Rose	1995
Nieuwe tongen	1999		
Taaltoerisme	2012	Lingo	2014
Vakantie in eigen taal	2016		
Lingua	2017		
Babel	2019	Babel	2018
De Dutchionary	2020		
Zeven talen in zeven dagen	2022		
