= Babel Fishh =

American rapper

- Also known as: BabelFishh
- Born: Scott Huber; June 5, 1981 (age 45); Redwood City, California, U.S.
- Genres: Alternative hip hop
- Occupations: Rapper, producer
- Years active: 2004-present
- Labels: Chorizo Approved, I Had An Accident Records, Decorative Stamp
- Website: babelfishh.bandcamp.com

Scott Huber (born June 5, 1981), known professionally as Babel Fishh (also stylized as BabelFishh), is an American alternative hip hop artist currently based in Houston, Texas.

== Career ==
His stage name is in reference to the Bable Fish (a form of biological universal translator) from Douglas Adams’ The Hitchhiker's Guide to the Galaxy.

After gaining some recognition in local rap circles in Houston, Texas, and opening for notable acts like Zechs Marquise, Babelfishh self-released his debut album, The Use Of Of, in 2005. These releases were followed by 3 self-financed European tours with Oskar Ohlson in 2008, 2009, 2011, and 2012 (to support Howl Bender).

== Style ==
Babelfishh has been described as "less of an alley-hardened battle rapper and more of a geeky, deep-thinking street poet, with a touch of both sci-fi freak Mike Ladd and ex-Soul Coughing frontman/poet M. Doughty to the whole mess". His 2012 release, Howl Bender, was called "a masterpiece in terms of transfiguring pure emotion into a tangible, audible entity."

== Discography ==
=== Albums ===
- The Use Of Of (2005)
- Tour CD 2008 (2008)
- 8th World Jamboree Babelfishh, Lewee Regal (2008)
- Pinkie Swear Babelfishh, Oskar Ohlson (2009)
- Stay Home Babelfishh, Oskar Ohlson, Filkoe (2010)
- We'd Rather Not Babelfishh, Oskar Ohlson (2012)
- Howl Bender (2012)
- Anxiety Lesions (2014)
- Writhe In The Ailments (2015)

=== EPs ===
- Fathers First Musket (2008)
- Cole Wurl Hustle EP (2009)
- Extended Family, The (with The Beastmaster) (2010)
- 667 : The Guild We Hold Close (with Edison) (2010)
- Tenshun & Babel Fishh (with Tenshun) (2011)
- Eyeless Terror (2011)
- Bloody-Chaos-Demo (2011)
- Skullinhanddemo (2011)
- Prison Soup (with Evak) (2012)

=== Singles ===
- "As the Loot Bag Laughs" (2011) (with AbSUrd)

=== Vinyl records ===
- Pinkie Swear Babelfishh, Osker Ohlson (2012) limited to 500 copies 12" vinyl (hand-numbered)
- Extended Family, The Babelfishh, The Beastmaster (2010) limited to 300 copies 7" vinyl (hand-numbered)

=== Guest appearances ===
- Papervehicle - "Another Cat Out of the Bag" (2011)
