= Z Space =

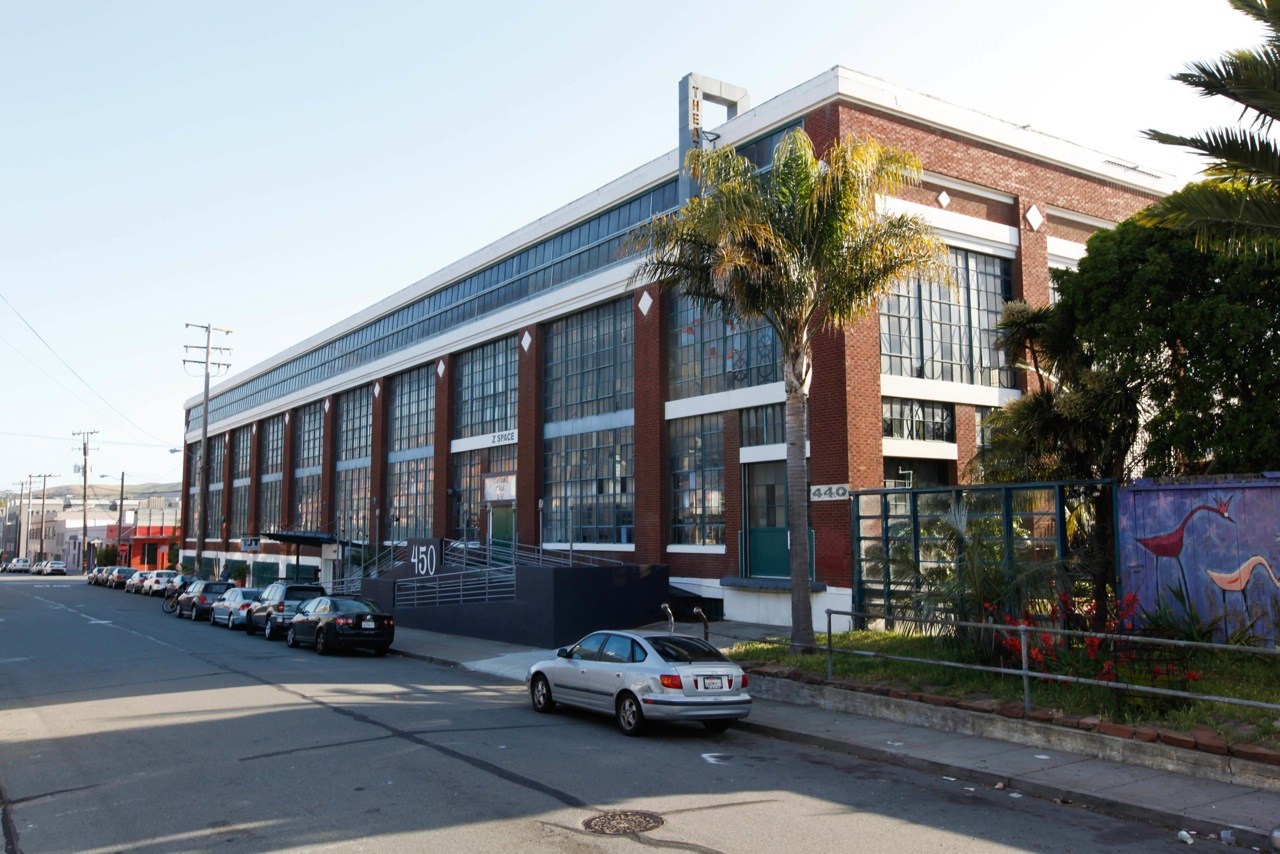
- Exterior view of Z Space
- Address: 450 Florida Street; San Francisco, California; United States
- Capacity: 230 seats for main theater
- Type: Regional theater

Construction
- Opened: 1971 as Project Artaud Theater
- Reopened: 2009 as Z Space

Website
- www.zspace.org

Z Space is a regional theater and performing arts company located in the Mission District of San Francisco, California. Z Space is one of the leading laboratories for developing new voices, new works, and new opportunities in the American theater. In addition to commissioning and producing its own works, Z Space also presents productions created by other organizations.

== History ==
Z Space was founded in 1993 by David Dower, as the outgrowth of earlier theatrical productions staged by artists known as the Z Collective, and was known for a time as the Z Space Studio. Dower was succeeded in 2007 by Lisa Steindler, who currently serves as Z Space’s executive artistic director.

In its first 15 years, Z Space developed and produced artistic works that were staged in a variety of San Francisco Bay Area theaters. Throughout the 90s and early 00s, Z Space worked with such artists as Josh Kornbluth, Anne Galjour, Randall Wong, and Brian Thorstensen. In 2009, Z Space moved into its own full-time facility in San Francisco’s Mission district, situated at 450 Florida Street. The 13,000-square-foot facility was originally constructed in the 1920s as a tooling factory for the American Can Company. During World War II, the building was converted into military use, making airplane parts. The building's interior was transformed into the Project Artaud Theater in 1971. In 2013, Z Space expanded into Z Below (formerly The Traveling Jewish Theater), an 86-seat complement to the 230-seat warehouse above.

In 2013, Z Space received a three-year grant from Andrew W. Mellon Foundation to sponsor a resident playwright, Peter Sinn Nachtrieb. That grant was renewed in 2016, giving Peter a stable artistic home for another three years. Since Peter’s residency began, Z Space has produced three of his plays, The Totalitarians in 2014, A House Tour of the Infamous Porter Family Mansion with Tour Guide Weston Ludlow Londonderry in 2016, and The Making of a Great Moment in 2017.

Other signature programs at Z Space include Word for Word, an in-house theater company that transforms works of literature verbatim to the stage, and Youth Arts, Z Space's outreach to schools, which promotes literacy and engages students’ creativity.

== Performances ==
Z Space’s performances span a variety of disciplines, including theater, dance, visual art, music and performance art. Through its Z Space New Works program, the organization develops unique works from initial concept to on-stage production; it also provides technical residencies in which artists can make use of the entire facility, including the stage, lights and sound system to test and develop their concepts.

Z Space has presented Bay Area premieres of internationally acclaimed performance ensembles The Wooster Group (2015), Elevator Repair Service (2014), Rude Mechs (2015), and Theatre Mitu (2015). Other notable presentations include works by Joe Goode Performance Group, Killing My Lobster, Big Art Group, Mugwumpin, LEVYdance, The Killbanes, piece by piece productions, and The Paul Dresher Ensemble.

In 2014, Z Space presented The Bengson's Hundred Days, which they also commissioned, developed, and produced. In 2015, Composers, Inc. presented the premiere of Allen Shearer's opera Middlemarch in Spring at Z Space. 2018 featured Kat Robichaud's A Very Merry Misfit Cabaret Holiday Special. 2019 had Kat Robichaud's Misfit Cabaret returning to Z space with "Lost in Z Space" a sci-fi musical variety show.

== Accolades ==
During the past decade, productions originating at Z Space have won national recognition including the Helen Hayes Award and the Joseph Kesselring Prize. From 2001 through 2005, 15 productions developed by Z Space earned Critics Circle nominations. In 2005, The People’s Temple was awarded the Will Glickman Award for “Best New Play.” That work was developed during more than four years at Z Space; it premiered at the Berkeley Repertory Theatre. In 2007, American $uicide, by Mark Jackson, was nominated by the American Theatre Critics Association for the annual ATCA/Steinberg New Play Award, honoring new scripts produced outside New York City.

Z Space's 2017 year garnered the organization title of "Best Performance Space" by Best of The Bay (of which they were also awarded for the 2016 year) and "Best Literary Remix" by San Francisco Magazine. Also in 2017, The Town Hall Affair by The Wooster Group presented at Z Space was listed by KQED as part of "The Best Bay Area Theater of 2017."
