= Wonky (genre) =

Fusion subgenre of electronic music

- Stylistic origins: Dubstep; hip-hop; glitch hop; synth-funk; jazz fusion; crunk; grime; 8-bit; G-funk; broken beat; techno; instrumental hip-hop
- Cultural origins: Late 2000s–early 2010s, United Kingdom

Regional scenes
- Aquacrunk; Purple sound

Wonky is a subgenre of electronic dance music known primarily for its off-kilter or "unstable" beats, as well as its eclectic, colorful blend of genres including hip-hop, electro-funk, 8-bit, jazz fusion, glitch, and crunk. Artists associated with the style include Joker, Rustie, Hudson Mohawke, Zomby, and Flying Lotus. The genre includes the microgenre aquacrunk and is related to purple sound.

== History ==
Wonky initially emerged in 2006 as a colorful, exuberant style drawing on hip-hop, synth-funk, glitchy electronica, and more eclectic influences, in contrast with the austere sound of the UK's ongoing dubstep and grime scenes. Other influences included American hip-hop producers J Dilla and Madlib, with some artists drawing more explicitly on an instrumental hip-hop sound rather than dubstep. The term "wonky" has been rejected by various artists associated with the style.

== Characteristics ==
Wonky is known for its off-kilter rhythms and typically features garish synthesizer tones, melodies, and effects. The "unstable" sound of wonky is often achieved by producing unquantised beats, abandoning the metronomic precision of much electronic music. Artists also use heavy sub-bass, which has been attributed to synergistic effects of bass with the drug ketamine, which became popular in UK clubs during the dubstep era. BBC Music called it a style of "slightly out-of-phase beats and synthesisers that wobble woozily, like they've warped after being left out in the sun."

== See also ==
- Dubstep
- Future bass
