= Golliwog (album) =

2025 studio album by Billy Woods

Studio album by Billy Woods
- Released: May 9, 2025
- Genres: Alternative hip-hop; underground hip-hop; horrorcore
- Length: 52:35
- Label: Backwoodz Studioz
- Producers: The Alchemist; Ant; DJ Haram; El-P; Eomac; Willie Green; Human Error Club; Shabaka Hutchings; Jeff Markey; Messiah Musik; Preservation; Saint Abdullah; Kenny Segal; Sadhugold; Steel Tipped Dove; Conductor Williams

Billy Woods chronology
Aethiopes (2022)	Golliwog (2025)

Singles from Golliwog
- 1. "Misery" Released: March 12, 2025; 2. "Blk Zmby" Released: April 11, 2025; 3. "Lead Paint Test" Released: May 7, 2025

Golliwog (stylized in all caps) is the ninth solo studio album by American rapper Billy Woods. A follow-up to Woods' previous album, Maps, it released through Backwoodz Studioz on May 9, 2025. It contains features from al.divino, Bruiser Wolf, Cavalier, Despot, Elucid, and Yoland Watson, while the production side is handled by The Alchemist, Ant, Conductor Williams, DJ Haram, El-P, Jeff Markey, Human Error Club, Kenny Segal, Messiah Musik, Preservation, Sadhugold, Saint Abdullah, Shabaka Hutchings, Steel Tipped Dove, and Willie Green. It is named after the racial caricature of the golliwog, a doll of which is featured on the cover.

== Background ==
Golliwog is Woods' first album since 2023's We Buy Diabetic Test Strips, as part of Armand Hammer with Elucid, and his first solo release since 2022's Aethiopes. He announced the album on March 12, 2025, with the release of the first single, "Misery". He released the second single, "Blk Zmby", on April 11. The album released on May 9, coinciding with a tour which included a performance at the Knockdown Center.

== Reception ==
Professional ratings
Aggregate scores
Source	Rating
AnyDecentMusic?	8.6/10
Metacritic	88/100
Review scores
Source	Rating
AllMusic	4/5 stars
Beats Per Minute	83%
Clash	9/10
Exclaim!	9/10
The Guardian	4/5 stars
The Line of Best Fit	9/10
MusicOMH	4.5/5 stars
Paste	8.9/10
Pitchfork	8.7/10
The Skinny	5/5 stars

Golliwog received critical acclaim. Liam Inscoe-Jones of The Line of Best Fit rated the album a 9/10, drawing comparisons to the novel Hurricane Season by Fernanda Melchor, writing: "Golliwog may be filled with allusions to the cannon of Black horror but its setting is the real world, a horror story created by our own loud silences. That's about as scary as it gets". Shaad D'Souza of The Guardian gave the album 4 out of 5 stars, writing: "It's heavier, if only slightly, than Woods' usual output. He still finds time for moments of beauty amid the bleakness". John Amen of Beats Per Minute rated it an 83%, writing: "he's as eloquent as ever, moving from abstract images to direct statements, from confessional rants to journalistic quips, from the troughs of despair to the apexes of mania". Paul Attard of Slant Magazine wrote: "Golliwog is intensely confrontational and makes no effort to hold your hand. But challenging times demand unapologetic art to reflect them and offer no easy answers or catharsis". Tom Morgan of Clash rated the album a 9/10, writing: "Golliwog is an abrasive, demanding album. woods' afro-pessimist vision of a world fundamentally hostile to every facet of black existence (family, history, spirituality) is a hell of a lot to chew on". Adam Turner-Heffer of The Skinny rated the album 5 out of 5 stars, writing: "Despite being an unnerving, disorienting listen, where samples of screams or phone calls clash with blank verse lines weaving in and out of consciousness, Golliwog is a hugely rewarding experience".

== Track listing ==
Golliwog track listing
No.	Title	Producer(s)	Length
1.	"Jumpscare"	Steel Tipped Dove	3:17
2.	"Star87"	Conductor Williams	2:38
3.	"Misery"	Kenny Segal	2:12
4.	"Blk Xmas" (featuring Bruiser Wolf)	Sadhugold	3:11
5.	"Waterproof Mascara"	Preservation	2:54
6.	"Counterclockwise"	The Alchemist	2:11
7.	"Corinthians" (featuring Despot)	El-P	3:23
8.	"Pitchforks & Halos"	Kenny Segal	2:22
9.	"All These Worlds Are Yours" (featuring Elucid)	Shabaka Hutchings; DJ Haram	2:44
10.	"Maquiladoras" (featuring al.divino)	Saint Abdullah; Eomac	3:08
11.	"A Doll Fulla Pins" (featuring Yolanda Watson)	Jeff Markey; Messiah Musik^{[c]}	3:31
12.	"Golgotha"	Messiah Musik	3:02
13.	"Cold Sweat"	Ant	2:24
14.	"Blk Zmby"	Steel Tipped Dove	2:14
15.	"Make No Mistake"	Messiah Musik	2:32
16.	"Born Alone"	Kenny Segal	2:56
17.	"Lead Paint Test" (featuring Elucid and Cavalier)	Willie Green	4:26
18.	"Dislocated" (featuring Elucid)	Human Error Club	3:46
Total length:			52:35

Bandcamp bonus track
No.	Title	Producer(s)	Length
19.	"Zaire" (featuring Elucid)	Andrew Broder	3:40
Total length:			56:15

CD and Japanese vinyl bonus track
No.	Title	Producer(s)	Length
19.	"Shiny Boots"	Theravada	1:45
Total length:			54:20

Vinyl bonus track
No.	Title	Producer(s)	Length
19.	"House In The Woods"	Steel Tipped Dove	2:26
Total length:			55:10

Cassette bonus track
No.	Title	Producer(s)	Length
19.	"Timesafari"	Sadhugold	1:26
Total length:			54:10

Note

- ^{^[c]} signifies a co-producer.

== Personnel ==
Credits adapted from the album's liner notes.

- Billy Woods – vocals, executive production
- Natalia Vascheisvilli – additional vocals (all tracks), additional instrumentation (track 4)
- Imogen B. – additional vocals
- K. Korto – additional vocals
- Zichen – additional vocals
- Alexander Richter – additional vocals, photography
- Mette Rasmussen – saxophone (tracks 10, 11)
- Anniessa – additional vocals (track 10)
- DJ Mo Niklz – cuts (tracks 17)
- Willie Green – mastering (all tracks), mixing (tracks 1–6, 8–15, 17, 18)
- Joey Raia – mixing (track 7)
- Kenny Segal – mixing (track 16)
- Steel Tipped Dove – engineering
- Mose Wheeler – engineering assistance
- Ashes57 – design
- Jellyhasbean – golliwog doll

== Charts ==
Chart performance for Golliwog
Chart (2025)	Peak position
German Albums (Offizielle Top 100)	41
Scottish Albums (Official Charts)	94
UK Albums Sales (OCC)	89
UK Independent Albums (Official Charts)	26
UK R&B Albums (Official Charts)	7
