= Hiding Places =

Studio album by Billy Woods & Kenny Segal
- Released: March 29, 2019
- Genre: Hip-hop
- Length: 40:23
- Label: Backwoodz Studioz
- Producer: Kenny Segal; Mothermary; Blockhead

Billy Woods chronology
Known Unknowns (2017)	Hiding Places (2019)	Terror Management (2019)

Kenny Segal chronology
Happy Little Trees (2018)	Hiding Places (2019)	Back at the House (2019)

Hiding Places is a collaborative studio album by Brooklyn rapper Billy Woods and Los Angeles record producer Kenny Segal. It was released by Backwoodz Studioz on March 29, 2019. It features guest appearances from Mothermary, Elucid, and Self Jupiter. The album cover is a photograph of the William Livingstone House in Detroit taken in 2006 by photographers Yves Marchand & Romain Meffre.

== Background and content ==
Kenny Segal produced Milo's 2015 album So the Flies Don't Come, which featured a guest appearance from Elucid. Elucid is one half of the duo Armand Hammer along with Billy Woods. Segal went on to provide beats to Armand Hammer's albums Rome and Paraffin. After that, Woods and Segal decided to create a collaborative album.

Woods has described the album's opening track, "Spongebob", as the first song on which he and Segal fully understood each other's visions for the album. The song was originally titled "Monotheism", but Woods retitled it after writing the chorus, which describes a situation as "underwater"—alluding to the term for an asset with negative equity.

== Critical reception ==
Professional ratings
Review scores
Source	Rating
The Fader	favorable
Pitchfork	7.7/10
Stereogum	favorable

Marcus J. Moore of Pitchfork gave the album a 7.7 out of 10, writing: "In a way, Hiding Places plays like a complement to early-00s underground New York rap, and sits alongside early Definitive Jux records." He added: "There's an edginess to the record, similar to Cannibal Ox's The Cold Vein, a feeling that the rapper will either self-destruct or nuke everything in his wake." Tom Breihan of Stereogum wrote: "The album works as a sweaty, jangled rumination on stress and fear and hopelessness and grim acceptance." Paul Thompson of The Fader called it "[Billy Woods'] leanest and his best [record]".

=== Accolades ===
Publication	Accolade	Rank	Ref.
NPR	25 Best Albums of 2019	9	
Stereogum	50 Best Albums of 2019	9	
Time	10 Best Albums of 2019	5	
Vice	100 Best Albums of 2019	8	
The Wire	Top 50 Releases 2019	44	

== Track listing ==
Hiding Places track listing
No.	Title	Length
1.	"Spongebob"	3:52
2.	"Steak Knives"	1:28
3.	"Checkpoints"	3:13
4.	"Spider Hole"	3:40
5.	"Houthi"	2:44
6.	"A Day in a Week in a Year" (featuring Mothermary)	5:04
7.	"Bedtime"	2:15
8.	"Crawlspace" (featuring Elucid)	3:45
9.	"Speak Gently" (featuring Self Jupiter)	4:53
10.	"Toothy"	2:17
11.	"Bigfakelaugh"	3:48
12.	"Red Dust"	3:24
Total length:		40:23

== Personnel ==
Credits adapted from liner notes.

- Billy Woods – vocals
- Kenny Segal – production, mixing
- Ryan Crosby – guitar (1, 4)
- Mothermary – vocals (6), additional production (6)
- Elucid – vocals (8)
- Blockhead – co-production (8)
- Self Jupiter – vocals (9)
- Steel Tipped Dove – engineering
- Willie Green – mastering
