= Snakes & Ladders (Armand Hammer album) =

2026 studio album by Armand Hammer

Studio album by Armand Hammer
- Released: November 11, 2026
- Genre: Hip-hop
- Length: 43:20
- Label: Backwoodz Studioz

Armand Hammer chronology
Mercy (2025)	Snakes & Ladders (2026)

Snakes & Ladders is the eighth studio album by American hip-hop duo Armand Hammer, composed of Billy Woods and Elucid. It was surprise released on November 11, 2026, through Backwoodz Studioz.

== Background ==
In late 2025, Woods and Elucid wrote the song "If We Must Die", which became the album's outro. The song was named for the poem "If We Must Die" by Claude McKay and was suggested to Woods by his mother. After writing the song, the two gave themselves the deadline of when the last snow melted in New York City.

Snakes & Ladders was surprise released on November 11, 2026, through Backwoodz Studioz. It follows Armand Hammer's 2025 album Mercy, which was a collaboration with the Alchemist. The album's release coincided with shows in Seattle, Denver, and Brooklyn, on November 11, 13, and 15, respectively.

== Contents ==
Snakes & Ladders, unlike their previous releases, covers Woods and Elucid's lives as fathers. On "Deadbolts", Woods raps about cooking dinner and playing with his children, and on the same song, Elucid includes a recording of his four-year-old asking him "daddy, are you happy?". Thematically, the album also covers "looping nature".

== Artwork and packaging ==
The cover for Snakes & Ladders was painted by artist Shane Ingersoll, who had previously painted the cover art for Armand Hammer's 2014 EP Furtive Movements and 2017 album Rome. Ingersoll has also previously illustrated the cover for Billy Woods' 2017 album Known Unknowns as well as Elucid and Fatboi Sharif's 2026 single Invasion Body Camera.

The album was sold as a box set created by Ingersoll and artist Ashes57 which included a playable board game. The board game came with an instruction sheet including rules written by Woods.

== Reception ==
Snakes & Ladders received positive reviews from critics. Writing for Pitchfork, Andre Gee gave it an 8.3/10, calling it "another lyrical masterclass".

== Track listing ==
All tracks are written by Billy Woods and Elucid.

No.	Title	Length
1.	"Deadbolts" (featuring Clipping)	3:21
2.	"Send for Me" (featuring Kenny Segal)	2:11
3.	"Lock Out/Tag Out" (featuring Sebb Bash)	2:09
4.	"Jet Magazine" (featuring Mekala Session and Kara-Do)	3:07
5.	"Nightswim" (featuring Kenny Segal)	2:56
6.	"TimesTables" (featuring Jeff Markey)	1:43
7.	"don't say it if it isn't true" (featuring Sebb Bash)	2:37
8.	"Gravity" (featuring Child Actor)	1:45
9.	"Vespers" (featuring Animoss)	2:44
10.	"Dragon Teeth" (featuring Theravada)	2:49
11.	"Incidentals" (featuring Peter Eldh and Mekala Session)	1:53
12.	"Graveside" (featuring DJ Haram, Eomac, and Saint Abdullah)	3:29
13.	"Dogville" (featuring Kenny Segal and Messiah Musik)	3:16
14.	"Assembly Lines" (featuring Preservation)	2:48
15.	"Risk" (featuring $ilkMoney and Steel Tipped Dove)	3:14
16.	"if we must die" (featuring Sebb Bash)	3:18
Total length:		43:20

== Charts ==
Chart performance for Snakes & Ladders
Chart (2026)	Peak position
UK Album Downloads (Official Charts)	41
