= William Livingstone House =

House in Detroit, Michigan built in 1894

Coordinates: 42°20′52.2″N 83°03′13.4″W

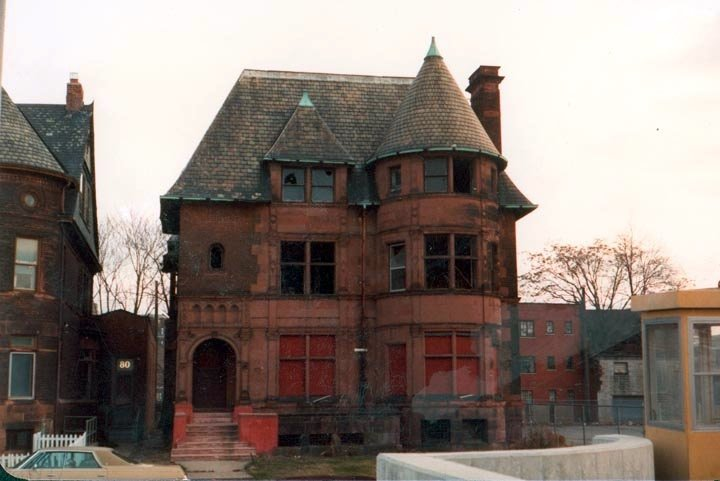
The William Livingstone House in 1983, at its original location at 76 Eliot Street.

The William Livingstone House, commonly called Slumpy, was a house constructed in 1894 and located in the Brush Park district of Detroit, Michigan. The home was architect Albert Kahn's first independent project.

== History ==
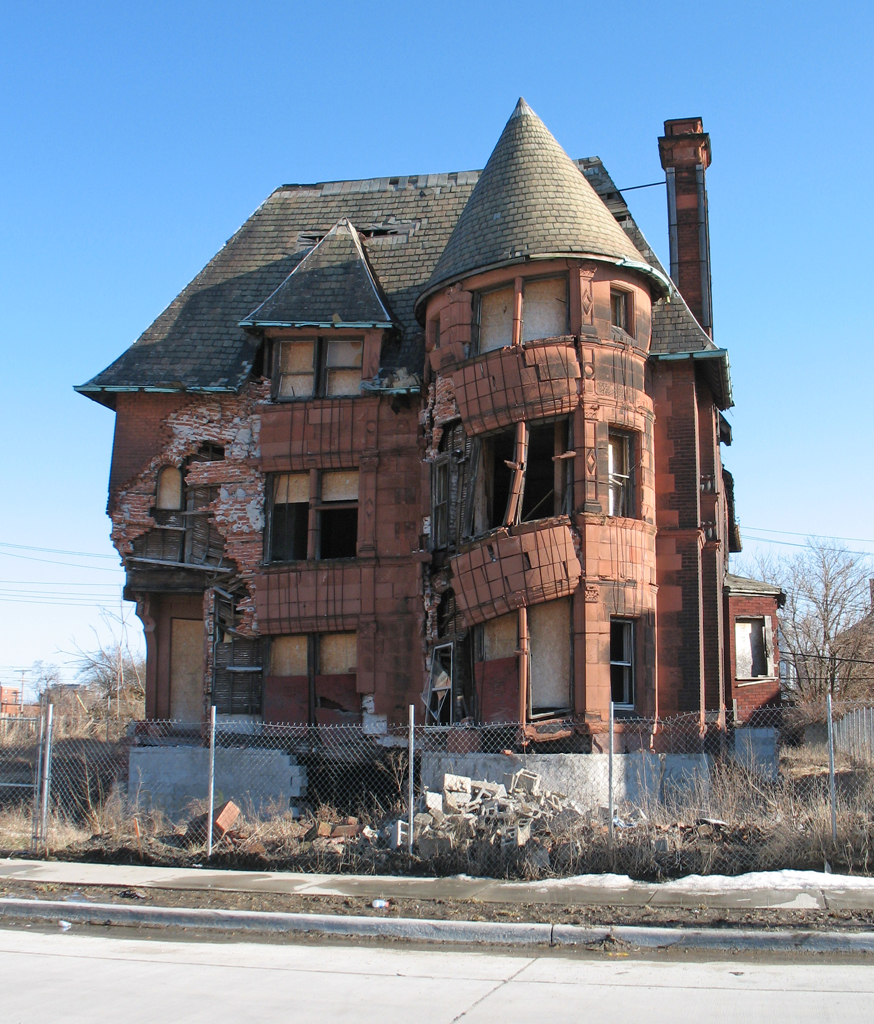
The William Livingstone House at 284 Eliot Street, shortly before demolition in 2007.

William Livingstone Jr. (1844–1925), publisher of the Detroit Evening Journal, was the second president of the Dime Savings Bank. He hired a young Kahn, who was working for the architectural firm of Mason & Rice, to design his residence at 76 Eliot Street. When he obtained this commission – presumably with Mason's help – Kahn was only 22 or 23 years old and had just returned from spending 1891 in Europe, studying the classical architecture of the Old World: his decision to design the home in the French Renaissance Revival style reflected the time he spent sketching the best Gallic architecture. For the house, Kahn incorporated elements of the French châteauesque style, such as bays and cone shaped turrets.

In 1987, the Red Cross intended to demolish the mansion, originally located west of John R. Street, to make way for their new building. Preservationists succeeded in moving the Livingstone House about one block to the east to 284 Eliot Street, but the building languished for many years. The William Livingstone House's subsequent blight and slumping circular tower earned it the nickname Slumpy among the ruins photography community. The building continued to decay to the point of collapse and was completely demolished on September 15, 2007. The William Livingstone House was commemorated in a painting by Lowell Boileau entitled Open House, which was unveiled the day of its demolition.

The cover of the 2019 studio album Hiding Places by Billy Woods and Kenny Segal is a photograph of the William Livingstone House taken in 2006 by photographers Yves Marchand and Romain Meffre.
