= Maps (Billy Woods and Kenny Segal album) =

2023 studio album by Billy Woods and Kenny Segal

Studio album by Billy Woods and Kenny Segal
- Released: May 5, 2023
- Genre: Hip-hop
- Length: 44:08
- Label: Backwoodz Studioz
- Producer: Kenny Segal

Billy Woods chronology
Church (2022)	Maps (2023)	Golliwog (2025)

Kenny Segal chronology
Indoors (2021)	Maps (2023)	How to Capture Playful (2023)

Singles from Maps
- 1. "FaceTime" Released: April 12, 2023; 2. "Soft Landing" Released: May 3, 2023

Maps is a collaborative studio album by rapper Billy Woods and producer Kenny Segal. It was released through Backwoodz Studioz on May 5, 2023, and features guest appearances from Elucid, Danny Brown, Aesop Rock, Quelle Chris, ShrapKnel, Benjamin Booker, and Samuel T. Herring. The album was preceded by two singles: "FaceTime", which was released on April 12, 2023, and "Soft Landing", which was released on May 3, 2023.

Maps is a hip-hop concept album about traveling and being in transit, inspired by Woods' experiences on tour in the early 2020s. Its instrumentals feature elements of jazz and boom bap. The album was widely acclaimed by critics, with Woods' lyrics and storytelling being especially singled out for praise; Maps has been described as one of 2023's best albums by outlets such as Pitchfork and Rolling Stone.

== Background and recording ==
Maps is the second collaborative album between Woods and Segal, following 2019's Hiding Places. Woods recounts that the duo had not worked closely together between the recording of Hiding Places and Maps. Though the two artists always intended to release additional collaborations, Woods states that he and Segal chose to pursue separate artistic directions after the release of Hiding Places to ensure that their future projects would not feel like a retread of its material.

After COVID-19 restrictions were lifted in North America and Europe, Woods undertook a crowded touring schedule, and his experiences with adjusting to this lifestyle after the pandemic informed the themes and recording process of Maps. Woods has estimated that he wrote "70 percent" of the album while touring, an approach he adopted after deciding to theme the album around travel. Parts of the album were recorded in Los Angeles, including at studios belonging to Segal and fellow producer The Alchemist, but Woods states that the majority of the recording took place while he was on tour.

On March 27, 2023, Woods and Segal announced that Maps would be released on May 5 of that year; they also announced that the album's release would be followed by a tour of the United States and Europe throughout May and June. The album's lead single, "FaceTime", was released on April 12. The track features singer Samuel T. Herring, who had previously collaborated with Segal on the 2019 album Back at the House. Maps' second single, "Soft Landing", was released on May 3, 2023. The tracks "Soft Landing" and "Babylon by Bus" received music videos, both of which were directed by actor Tim Blake Nelson and his son Henry Nelson.

== Content ==
Maps is a concept album about Woods' experiences as a touring musician. The album has also been characterized as a "travelogue", focusing less on any specific destination and moreso on the experience of being physically in transit. Maps portrays travel as an experience that can often lead to indignities and alienation, but that is also capable of providing escape and adventure. Woods has compared the album's narrative to that of the hero's journey, and emphasizes that its arc concludes with a return home. Throughout the album, Woods uses food imagery as a motif to characterize the places through which he transits. Woods also makes frequent references to marijuana, which is depicted on Maps as a source of comfort in unfamiliar places; however, Woods' struggles to obtain it at an acceptable price or quality are a recurring obstacle he faces on his journey. In addition to the album's focus on travel, some critics have identified Maps as showcasing Woods' reaction to his increasingly prominent status in the underground hip-hop scene. Other reviewers observed that Maps departs from the "political and historical" subject matter that had characterized Woods' 2022 albums, Aethiopes and Church.

Segal's production on Maps has been likened to jazz. The album's instrumentation prominently incorporates saxophone and piano melodies, as well as guitars and sampled flutes. Alex Hudson of Exclaim! remarked that the sonic palette of the album varied between boom bap and more abstract production throughout the album. Several commentators contrasted the production on Maps to that of Hiding Places: Maps was generally described as lighter in tone than its precursor, with Segal moving away from the "dissonant" soundscapes of Hiding Places. However, NPR's Sheldon Pearce has argued that Maps still displays a form of tension, as Segal aims to portray the disorientation of being constantly on the move.

The album cover, inspired by the design of airplane safety brochures, was illustrated by Ashes57. It has been described as "depict[ing] Woods' unique brand of airplane etiquette".

=== Songs ===
The album's opening track, "Kenwood Speakers", features a distorted beat built on a "snapping" drum line. On the song, Woods describes himself attending an "antagonistic" Brooklyn dinner party with his neighbors, at which he tells "mischievous lies" that goad the party's host into suicide. The second track, "Soft Landing", centers around a chorus that interpolates the pop standard "Feeling Good". Its instrumental incorporates "sun-drenched" acoustic guitar and "sludgy" bass, over which Woods recalls finding moments of hope in an otherwise stressful life. "Soundcheck" is a "dreamlike" song where Woods seeks to escape the tedious routines of travel and unpacking, instead taking in his new surroundings through sensory experiences like watching sunsets and eating Szechuan food. Critics describe it as a track on which Woods seeks to confront "stage pressure" and find "joy in new spaces". It is followed by "Rapper Weed", which reflects on the sights and people that one finds at a marijuana dispensary.

"Blue Smoke" features a beat inspired by free jazz, over which Woods imagines his domestic disputes being surveilled and commented upon by FBI agents. On the following track, "Bad Dreams Are Only Dreams", Woods satirizes critical analysis by describing a nightmare in which his brain is served as a meal. "Babylon by Bus", which samples the Aphex Twin song "#2", incorporates IDM elements that pivot into a "surge of strings". The song includes a guest appearance from the rap duo ShrapKnel. It is followed by "Year Zero", a track built upon "towering drones" and "eerie synths". The content of the song features Woods lamenting that the world is broken beyond repair, and expressing his wish to see society destroyed so that future generations can rebuild it from nothing. "Year Zero" also features Danny Brown, who delivers an extended verse that has been variously characterized as "exuberant", "manic", and "unhinged". Reflecting on his experience of the collaboration, Woods recalls Brown arriving at the recording studio with a sizable entourage and a large amount of material prepared:

When he showed up, it was memorable. Danny came through with two cars ... He had the rhyme on two separate phones. He continued rhyming. I mean, it just went on. It was crazy. It's longer than even what's on there, I think.

The midpoint of the tracklist is "Hangman", a song that incorporates moments of "bemused comfort" despite an overall grim mood. On "Baby Steps", Woods narrates an incident when he had to take an interstate Uber ride to travel between tour dates; he compares himself to the album cover of Future's I Never Liked You when describing his attempts to sleep through the journey. "The Layover" samples a bebop piano line as Woods compares bystanders who witness police brutality to those who observed the sick from afar during the Black Death. Lead single "FaceTime", a track that has been described as the album's "emotional core", features a boom bap beat upon which Segal layers saxophone, bass, and synth keyboard elements. Samuel T. Herring provides the song's chorus, which reflects on the loneliness that touring can bring; Woods recounts a situation where, alone at a hotel, he watched concertgoers attending an afterparty. In an interview with Huck, Woods elaborates further on the song's themes of how a traveler can become isolated from their loved ones:

I was expanding upon the idea of maintaining relationships at a distance. Your daily life when you are out on the road and touring is confusing. ... You feel like you are missing out on [family] life, but other times it is a rush and a getaway from things you can't deal with. ["FaceTime"] definitely explores this duality.

"Agriculture" is a "dreamy" track where Woods imagines himself as a farmer and cannabis grower. It is followed by "Houdini", where Woods portrays himself as using marijuana to keep occupied during a lull in his travel schedule. "Waiting Around" features a lyrically dense verse from rapper Aesop Rock. "NYC Tapwater", the album's penultimate song, sees Woods returning to his New York home, where he discovers that gentrification has transformed the neighborhood during his absence. Maps concludes with "As the Crow Flies", on which Woods discusses the experience of needing to resume one's daily responsibilities after a return from travel. After a "meditative" guest appearance from Elucid, Woods describes himself playing with his son at a park in the song's brief closing verse, and recounts the realization that observing his son's growth makes him increasingly aware of his own mortality.

== Critical reception ==
Professional ratings
Aggregate scores
Source	Rating
AnyDecentMusic?	8.4/10
Metacritic	90/100
Review scores
Source	Rating
AllMusic	4/5 stars
Beats Per Minute	91%
Clash	9/10
HipHopDX	4.6/5
The Line of Best Fit	9/10
Mojo	4/5 stars
Pitchfork	8.9/10
Rolling Stone	4/5 stars
Sputnikmusic	4.1/5
Stereogum	Favorable

Maps achieved widespread praise from music critics. At Metacritic, which assigns a weighted average score out of 100 to reviews from mainstream critics, Maps received an average score of 90 based on 10 reviews, indicating "universal acclaim".

Woods' writing on Maps has attained particular commendation: Sheldon Pearce of NPR lauded the album as a "master class, even for one of rap's greatest-ever penmen", and Pitchfork's Stephen Kearse argued that it placed Woods "into the ranks of rap's great stylists and storytellers". Jeff Terich of Treble described Woods' lyrics as "profound, subtle poetry", and Kearse remarked that the writing "brings people and places to life with quick, visceral strokes". A more mixed appraisal of Woods' writing came from Mosi Reeves of Rolling Stone, who viewed Maps as less passionate than 2022's Aethiopes. Several critics, including Pearce and AllMusic's Paul Simpson, identified Maps as one of the most accessible albums in Woods' catalogue: Simpson stated that it "contain[s] some of his clearest, most vivid narratives", while Pearce found it to be the rapper's "clearest, most engaging music". Eden Tizard of Clash opined that Maps featured more "emotional frankness" than Woods' solo discography. Woods' deadpan humor on the album also received favorable commentary.

Segal's production on Maps was regarded positively as well. Stephen Kearse characterized it as "globetrotting", and credited Segal with using a diverse selection of beats to encourage Woods to explore "new sonic and narrative spaces". Stereogum's Tom Breihan described the overall mood of the production as a reflection of Woods' "combination of comfort and anxiety". Dash Lewis of HipHopDX characterized Segal's work on Maps as "a palette of clean, expansive beats", and commended him for creating a diverse soundscape while also allowing Woods' lyrics to take the foreground; Miloslaw Archibald Rugallini of Sputnikmusic gave further praise to the chemistry between the two artists, remarking that Segal "has a firm grasp on [Woods'] gift" and had composed instrumentals that would enable Woods to showcase his strengths. Segal's beats have been identified as employing "clear melodies that invite the listener to lean in closer", but also as featuring drum lines that "lurch sideways [rather than] falling into the old head-nod patterns". The overall sound of Maps was described by Sheldon Pearce as having "more color and pulse" than Segal's earlier work on Hiding Places.

=== Year-end lists ===
Select year-end rankings of Maps
Critic/Publication	List	Rank	Ref.
Consequence	The 50 Best Albums of 2023	4	
Exclaim!	Exclaim!'s 50 Best Albums of 2023	7	
Paste	The 50 Best Albums of 2023	23	
Pitchfork	The 50 Best Albums of 2023	3	
Rolling Stone	The 100 Best Albums of 2023	8	
Stereogum	The 50 Best Albums of 2023	3	
The Line of Best Fit	The Best Albums of 2023	8	

== Track listing ==
Maps track listing
No.	Title	Length
1.	"Kenwood Speakers"	1:21
2.	"Soft Landing"	2:53
3.	"Soundcheck" (with Quelle Chris)	2:56
4.	"Rapper Weed"	3:14
5.	"Blue Smoke"	1:32
6.	"Bad Dreams Are Only Dreams"	1:09
7.	"Babylon by Bus" (with ShrapKnel)	2:08
8.	"Year Zero" (with Danny Brown)	3:40
9.	"Hangman"	2:55
10.	"Baby Steps" (with Elucid and Benjamin Booker)	3:25
11.	"The Layover"	2:50
12.	"FaceTime" (with Samuel T. Herring)	3:32
13.	"Agriculture"	1:40
14.	"Houdini"	2:24
15.	"Waiting Around" (with Aesop Rock)	3:01
16.	"NYC Tapwater"	3:08
17.	"As the Crow Flies" (with Elucid)	2:20
Total length:		44:08

== Personnel ==
Credits adapted from Bandcamp and Apple Music.

=== Performance ===
- Billy Woods – vocals
- Aaron Carmack – Rhodes piano (tracks 3, 17)
- Aaron Shaw – tenor saxophone (track 12)
- Aesop Rock – vocals (track 15)
- Benjamin Booker – vocals (track 10)
- Danny Brown – vocals (track 8)
- Elucid – vocals (tracks 10, 17)
- Jason Wool – piano (track 11), Rhodes piano (track 16)
- Joanne – additional vocals (track 15)
- Mike Parvizi – bass (track 17)
- Quelle Chris – vocals (track 3)
- Ryan Crosby – guitar (track 17)
- ShrapKnel – vocals (track 7)
- Samuel T. Herring – vocals (track 12)
- Shabaka Hutchings – flute (track 10)

=== Technical ===
- Kenny Segal – production, mixing, engineering
- Steel Tipped Dove – engineering
- Aesop Rock – additional engineering
- Willie Green – mastering

== Charts ==
Chart performance for Maps
Chart (2023)	Peak position
Scottish Albums (Official Charts)	81
UK Independent Albums (Official Charts)	31
UK R&B Albums (Official Charts)	7
