= Mercy (Armand Hammer and the Alchemist album) =

Studio album by Armand Hammer and the Alchemist
- Released: November 7, 2025
- Genre: Hip-hop
- Length: 41:51
- Labels: Backwoodz; Rhymesayers
- Producer: The Alchemist

Armand Hammer chronology
We Buy Diabetic Test Strips (2023)	Mercy (2025)	Snakes & Ladders (2026)

Singles from Mercy
- 1. "Super Nintendo" Released: October 14, 2025

Mercy is the second collaborative studio album by American hip-hop duo Armand Hammer and American hip-hop producer the Alchemist. It was released on November 7, 2025.

== Background ==
Mercy follows the release of We Buy Diabetic Test Strips in 2023. It was announced on September 10, 2025. It is a collaboration with record producer the Alchemist, who had produced their 2021 album Haram. On October 14, Armand Hammer released its lead single, "Super Nintendo", on October 14. It released on November 7.

== Critical reception ==
Professional ratings
Aggregate scores
Source	Rating
Metacritic	79/100
Review scores
Source	Rating
AllMusic	4/5 stars
Beats Per Minute	89%
The Line of Best Fit	8/10
Pitchfork	8.0/10
PopMatters	8/10
Slant Magazine	3/5 stars
Paste	8.0/10

According to the review aggregator Metacritic, Mercy received "generally favorable reviews" based on a weighted average score of 79 out of 100 from 8 critic scores. Dash Lewis of Pitchfork rated the album 8.0, saying "Mercy reunites woods and Elucid with prestige rap kingmaker The Alchemist, who turns in some of his weirdest and most harrowing production since The Skeleton Key". John Amen of The Line of Best Fit rated the album 8/10, saying "if the duo have leaned toward elliptical writing in the past, here it’s particularly pronounced". Koda Lin of Shatter the Standards rated the album 4/5 stars, saying "throughout Mercy, The Alchemist continues to find new emotional registers for Armand Hammer’s language". Paul Attard of Slant Magazine rated it 3/5 stars, saying "Mercy is the kind of album that elicits respect more than it does excitement". Casey Epstein-Gross of Paste rated the album 8.0/10, writing that its subdued, carefully sustained atmosphere can cause some tracks to blur together, though the overall effect remains compelling.

=== Accolades ===
Publication	Accolade	Rank	Ref.
Beats Per Minute	Top 50 Albums of 2025	8	
Clash	Albums Of The Year 2025	49	
Gorilla vs. Bear	Gorilla vs. Bear's Albums of 2025	9	
HotNewHipHop	The 40 Best Rap Albums Of 2025	26	
Paste	The 25 best rap albums of 2025	7	

== Track listing ==
All tracks produced by The Alchemist.

No.	Title	Writer(s)	Length
1.	"Laraaji"	Billy Woods; Elucid; Daniel Alan Maman	2:23
2.	"Peshawar"	Woods; Elucid; Maman	2:12
3.	"Calypso Gene" (featuring Silka and Cleo Reed)	Woods; Elucid; Maman; Silka; Ella Moore	2:57
4.	"Glue Traps" (featuring Quelle Chris)	Woods; Elucid; Maman; Gavin Christopher Tennille	3:35
5.	"Scandinavia"	Woods; Elucid; Maman	3:15
6.	"Nil by Mouth"	Woods; Elucid; Maman	3:08
7.	"Dogeared" (featuring Kapwani)	Woods; Elucid; Maman; Kapwani	2:52
8.	"Crisis Phone" (featuring Pink Siifu)	Woods; Elucid; Maman; Livingston Matthews	4:02
9.	"Moonbow"	Woods; Elucid; Maman	2:29
10.	"No Grabba"	Woods; Elucid; Maman	4:15
11.	"U Know My Body"	Woods; Elucid; Maman	2:00
12.	"Longjohns" (featuring Quelle Chris & Cleo Reed)	Woods; Elucid; Maman; Tennille; Moore	2:42
13.	"California Games" (featuring Earl Sweatshirt)	Woods; Elucid; Maman; Thebe Neruda Kgositsile	3:13
14.	"Super Nintendo"	Woods; Elucid; Maman	2:41
Total length:			41:51

== Charts ==
Chart performance for Mercy
Chart (2025)	Peak position
UK Album Downloads (Official Charts)	32
