= Revelator (Elucid album) =

Studio album by Elucid
- Released: October 11, 2024
- Genre: Hip-hop
- Length: 44:59
- Label: Fat Possum
- Producers: Elucid; Jon Nellen; August Fanon; Child Actor; Saint Abdullah; Alan Duggan; Samiyam; Andrew Broder; The Lasso; DJ Haram

Elucid chronology
I Told Bessie (2022)	Revelator (2024)	I Guess U Had to Be There (2026)

Revelator is a studio album by American rapper and record producer Elucid. It was released on October 11, 2024, through Fat Possum Records. It received universal acclaim from critics.

== Background ==
Elucid is an American rapper and record producer. Revelator is billed as his third solo studio album, following Save Yourself (2016) and I Told Bessie (2022). It is produced by Elucid, Jon Nellen, August Fanon, Child Actor, Saint Abdullah, Alan Duggan of Gilla Band, Samiyam, Andrew Broder, The Lasso, and DJ Haram. It features guest appearances from Creature (on "CCTV"), Billy Woods (on "Bad Pollen" and "Instant Transfer"), and Skech185 (on "14.4").

The album was released on October 11, 2024, through Fat Possum Records.

== Critical reception ==
Professional ratings
Aggregate scores
Source	Rating
Metacritic	83/100
Review scores
Source	Rating
AllMusic	4/5 stars
Mojo	4/5 stars
Pitchfork	7.8/10

According to the review aggregator Metacritic, Revelator received "universal acclaim" based on a weighted average score of 83 out of 100 from 5 critic scores.

Paul Simpson of AllMusic described the album as "a frantic, jarring, and unpredictable effort which darts from breakbeat-fueled mayhem to noisy droning, all framing Elucid's persistent lyrics about caring for his family, struggling for survival and success inside a racist system, and maintaining hope." Timmhotep Aku of Pitchfork commented that "The themes of resistance, struggle, family, and finding joy amid daily horrors are universal but the references are specific to his experience as a native New Yorker and world traveler." He added, "it's soul food for those who know a better world is possible if we're willing to fight for it." Dash Lewis of Bandcamp Daily stated, "It's an album that confronts the horrors of our modern world and, as the title suggests, reveals them to be as noxious and absurd as they seem."

The album was nominated for the Best Hip-Hop/Rap Record award at the 2025 Libera Awards.

=== Accolades ===
Year-end lists for Revelator
Publication	List	Rank	Ref.
AllMusic	AllMusic Best of 2024	—	
Bandcamp Daily	The Best Albums of 2024: Essential Releases	—	
BrooklynVegan	Top 50 Albums of 2024	33	
Crack	The 50 Best Albums of 2024	29	
Okayplayer	The 50 Best Albums of 2024	—	
Paste	The 20 Best Rap Albums of 2024	15	
Rolling Stone	The 100 Best Albums of 2024	66	

== Track listing ==
Revelator track listing
No.	Title	Producer(s)	Length
1.	"The World Is Dog"	Jon Nellen; Elucid	3:05
2.	"CCTV" (featuring Creature)	August Fanon; Elucid	3:38
3.	"Yottabyte"	Child Actor	1:17
4.	"Bad Pollen" (featuring Billy Woods)	Saint Abdullah	4:07
5.	"Slum of a Disregard"	Elucid	2:22
6.	"RFID"	Alan Duggan	1:49
7.	"Instant Transfer" (featuring Billy Woods)	Samiyam	2:49
8.	"Ikebana"	Jon Nellen; Elucid	3:44
9.	"In the Shadow of If"	Jon Nellen; Elucid^{[a]}	3:27
10.	"SKP"	Andrew Broder	4:11
11.	"Huspuppies"	Elucid	1:34
12.	"14.4" (featuring Skech185)	Saint Abdullah; The Lasso	4:06
13.	"Voice 2 Skull"	Child Actor	2:26
14.	"Xolo"	The Lasso	3:17
15.	"Zigzagzig"	DJ Haram	3:07
Total length:			44:59

Notes

- All track titles are stylized in all caps.
- ^{^[a]} signifies a co-producer.

== Personnel ==
Credits adapted from liner notes.

- Elucid – vocals, production (1, 2, 5, 8, 11), co-production (9)
- DJ Stitches – turntables (1, 2)
- Luke Stewart – bass guitar (1, 5, 8, 9, 11)
- Jon Nellen – production (1, 8, 9)
- Creature – vocals (2)
- August Fanon – production (2)
- Child Actor – production (3, 13)
- Billy Woods – vocals (4, 7)
- Saint Abdullah – production (4, 12)
- Mekala Sessions – drums (5)
- Alan Duggan – production (6)
- Samiyam – production (7)
- Andrew Broder – production (10)
- Skech185 – vocals (12)
- The Lasso – production (12, 14)
- DJ Haram – production (15)
- Mose Wheeler – engineering assistance
- Willie Green – mixing, mastering
- Alexander Richter – photography
- Ryan Mowry – illustration

== Charts ==
Chart performance for Revelator
Chart (2024)	Peak position
UK Album Downloads (Official Charts)	88
