= Purple Moonlight Pages =

Studio album by R.A.P. Ferreira
- Released: March 6, 2020
- Length: 52:03
- Label: Ruby Yacht
- Producers: Aaron Carmack; Kenny Segal; Mike Parvizi; Rob Araujo

R.A.P. Ferreira chronology
The Truly Ancient and Original Lefthanded Styles of the Hoodwinkers and Penny Pinchers (2019)	Purple Moonlight Pages (2020)

Singles from Purple Moonlight Pages
- 1. "Doldrums" Released: January 10, 2020; 2. "Leaving Hell" Released: February 21, 2020

Purple Moonlight Pages is the fifth studio album by American rapper Rory Ferreira. It is the first studio album released under the moniker R.A.P. Ferreira. The album was produced by longtime collaborator Kenny Segal's group The Jefferson Park Boys, which features producers/multi-instrumentalists Aaron Carmack, Mike Parvizi, and Kenny Segal. Carmack handles most of the keys, live drums, and horns, Parvizi handles the bass, and Segal handles the beats and some keys. "Purple Moonlight Pages" has features from underground rapper Mike Ladd (who R.A.P. Ferreira has noted as an influence and frequently referenced on his project So the Flies Don't Come) and frequent collaborator Open Mike Eagle.

== Critical reception ==
Professional ratings
Review scores
Source	Rating
Pitchfork	7.7/10

Stephen Kearse of Pitchfork reviewed Purple Moonlight Pages as "his most free-spirited project yet".

== Track listing ==
No.	Title	Length
1.	"Decorum"	1:48
2.	"Greens"	3:12
3.	"Noncipher"	2:21
4.	"Omens & Totems"	3:00
5.	"U.D.I.G. (United Defenders Of International Goodwill)"	2:08
6.	"Laundry"	2:43
7.	"Dust Up"	3:08
8.	"Cycles"	3:22
9.	"Absolutes"	2:15
10.	"No Starving Artists"	2:30
11.	"Leaving Hell"	2:44
12.	"Doldrums"	3:13
13.	"An Idea is a Work of Art" (featuring Mike Ladd)	4:15
14.	"Mythical"	3:12
15.	"Pinball" (featuring Open Mike Eagle)	3:02
16.	"Golden Sardine"	2:22
17.	"Ro Talk"	4:10
18.	"Masterplan"	2:39

== Personnel ==
Credits adapted from Bandcamp.

- Rob Araujo – piano (tracks 12, 16)
- Aaron Carmack – Moog Opus 3 (track 4), live drums (tracks 5, 11, 12, 14, 16), keys (tracks 8, 13, 14), Rhodes (tracks 9, 10, 11, 18), horns (tracks 11, 13, 14, 16, 17), programming (track 16)
- Daddy Kev – mastering
- Miles Doulas – Rhodes (track 17)
- The Jefferson Park Boys – production
- Alexander Kollman – artwork
- Mike Ladd – vocals (track 13)
- Open Mike Eagle – vocals (track 15)
- DJ Prolifix – scratches (tracks 6, 9, 12)
- Mike Parvizi – bass (tracks 1, 2, 4, 5, 7, 9, 10–14, 17, 18), Casio CZ101 (track 6), guitar (track 8)
- R.A.P. Ferreira – executive producer, vocals (tracks 1–18)
- Kenny Segal – executive producer, mixing, programming (tracks 1, 3–6, 8–15, 17), additional production (track 2), Omnichord (tracks 7, 8), MicroGranny 2 (track 7), Rhodes (track 8), drums (track 13), arrangement (track 18)
- Aaron Shaw – saxophone (track 3), flute (track 18)
- Thomas Tsuruda – programming (track 2)
- Jason Wool – Rhodes (tracks 1, 2)
