= Headtrip =

Headtrip or variants may refer to:

- Headtrip (comics), character from True Believers (comics)
- Headtrip (album), Slapshock 2001
- "Headtrip", song by Sevendust from Home (Sevendust album)
- "Headtrip", from the Copperpot album Chapter 7 (2005) Verb T
- Headtrip (band), original name of German rock band 4Lyn

== See also ==
- Headtrip to Nowhere Flybanger 2001
- Lt Headtrip, hip hop artist living in Queens, NY
