= Child Actor (producer) =

American music producer

- Origin: New Haven, Connecticut; Boston, Massachusetts, U.S.
- Genres: Hip hop; electronic; contemporary R&B
- Years active: 2012–present
- Labels: Fake Four Inc.; Backwoodz Studioz
- Members: Max Heath
- Past members: Sedgie Ogilvy; Natalie Plaza
- Website: childactor.net

Max Heath, better known by his stage name Child Actor, is an American underground hip hop producer. Heath has contributed production to artists such as Earl Sweatshirt, Navy Blue, Open Mike Eagle, billy woods, and Armand Hammer.

== History ==
Child Actor was originally a dream pop duo formed by cousins Max Heath and Sedgie Ogilvy. They released the Partner EP in February 2012 and the Window EP in July 2012.

Their first album, Victory, was released on Fake Four Inc. on October 16, 2012. Don Yates of KEXP-FM described the album as "an impressive set of maximalist, R&B-tinged electro-pop with a huge, lush sound featuring walls of glittering synths, hip hop-influenced rhythms, chopped samples, wispy vocals and sugary pop melodies." Alyce Currier of Earmilk said, "With more emotional staying power than a lot of music caught up in today's rapid release cycle, I think this one is a keeper."

Ogilvy left Child Actor in December 2012 with Natalie Plaza taking her place. Child Actor released their sophomore album, Never Die, in September 2014, followed by A Perfect Cloud in 2016.

In 2021, Child Actor released an album entitled Respawn with frequent collaborator Televangel via Fake Four Inc.

In 2022, Heath played keyboard in a recording session along with jazz musician Shabaka Hutchings that would form the foundation for the 2023 Armand Hammer album We Buy Diabetic Test Strips.

Heath gained wider recognition in 2024 after making contributions to critically acclaimed albums by artists such as Navy Blue, Elucid, and Previous Industries, as well as releasing his first full-length collaboration album with underground rapper Cavalier. In a 2024 interview, producer The Alchemist, when asked his thoughts about emerging producers, responded:

Child Actor is insane. Child Actor is out of his mind. That guy's really good, he’s impressed me a lot lately. ... [I]f I have my vote, then Child Actor is the one.

== Discography ==
=== Albums ===
- Victory (2012)
- Never Die (2014)
- A Perfect Cloud (2016)
- Respawn (2021) (with Televangel)
- Ajai II Instrumentals (2023)
- CINE (2024) (with Cavalier)
- Here and Here (2025) (with August Fanon)

=== EPs ===
- Partner (2012)
- Window (2012)
- Promise (2013)
- Siempre Mia (2020) (with Televangel)
- Sunscreen (2024) (with Shemar)

=== Guest appearances ===
- Dark Time Sunshine – "Valiant" and "Forget Me Not" from Anx (2012)
- Blue Sky Black Death – "This Is It" and "Can't Take It With Me When I Die" from Cliff of Death EP with Deniro Farrar (2012)
- Sadistik – "Palmreader" from Flowers for My Father (2013)
- Deniro Farrar – "Death or Forever" and "Croisade" from The Patriarch II (2013)
- Blue Sky Black Death – "I" and "II" from Glaciers (2013)
- Deniro Farrar – "Rebirth/Hold On" from Rebirth (2014)
- Sadistik – "Orange" from Ultraviolet (2014)
- Serengeti – "Never Fall Back" from Energy EP (2019)

=== Production ===
- Busdriver – "Utilitarian Uses of Love (Child Actor remix)" from Beaus$Eros (Deluxe Version) (2012)
- Ceschi – "Work Song" from Forgotten Forever (2014)
- Serengeti – Energy EP (all songs, 2019)
- Billy Woods – "Shepherd's Tone (feat. Fielded)" from Terror Management (2019)
- Armand Hammer – "Charms (feat. Keiyaa)" from Shrines (2020)
- Moor Mother and Billy Woods – "Rapunzal", "Blak Forrest" (featuring Fielded), "Tiberius" (featuring Elucid), and "Portrait" (featuring Navy Blue) from Brass (2020)
- Fielded – "Justus (Child Actor remix)" (featuring Billy Woods) from The Sherita Sessions: Demisexual Lovelace Remixes (2021)
- Elucid – "Spellling", "Old Magic", "Mangosteen feat. Billy Woods", and "Split Tongue" from I Told Bessie (2022)
- ShrapKnel – "Running Rebel Swordplay", "Obol", and "A Tribe All Stressed" from Metal Lung (2022)
- AKAI SOLO – "Sun 2 Moon" from Body Feeling (2022)
- Amani & Robalu – "Starchild" from I'll Be Right Black! (2022)
- Serengeti – Ajai II (all songs, 2022)
- Open Mike Eagle – "The Song With the Secret Name", "I Retired Then I Changed My Mind", and "Peak Lockdown Raps" from Component System with the Auto Reverse (2022)
- Open Mike Eagle – "A New Rap Festival Called Falling Loud", "The Grand Prize Game on the Bozo Show feat. Video Dave & Still Rift", "We Should Have Made Otherground a Thing", "The Wire S3 E1 feat. Blu", and "Dave Said These Are the Liner Notes" from another triumph of ghetto engineering (2023)
- Fielded – "Take Me There feat. Teether", "You Chasing Me", "Dream Interlude", and "Goddess Woes feat. Wolf Weston" from Plus One (2023)
- Armand Hammer – "The Flexible Unreliability of Time and Memory" from We Buy Diabetic Test Strips (2023)
- Armand Hammer – "Drowning Machine" from BLK LBL (2024)
- Previous Industries – "Showbiz" from Showbiz / Braids (2024)
- Ceschi – "Fin" and "Santa Lucía" from Bring Us The Head Of Francisco False (Part 1) (2024)
- shemar – sunscreen (all songs, 2024)
- Cavalier – "50 Bags feat. Lord Chilla" from Different Type Time (2024)
- Previous Industries – "Showbiz", "Pliers", "Roebuck", "Montgomery Ward", "Babbages", "Fotomat", "Zayre", and "Kay Bee" from Service Merchandise (2024)
- Navy Blue – "Low Threshold" and "Basis" from Memoirs in Armour (2024)
- money for water – "A Canvas For Us All" from Traveling Light (2024)
- Elucid – "Yottabyte" and "Voice 2 Skull" from Revelator (2024)
- Cavalier – CINE (all songs, 2024)
- Child Actor & August Fanon – Here and Here (25 songs, 2025)
- Previous Industries – "West Coast Video", "Rock N Roll McDonald's", and "Goldblatt's" from Evergreen Plaza (2025)
- Premrock – "Void Lacquer" and "Plunder" from Did You Enjoy Your Time Here...? (2025)
- Fly Anakin – "NOTTOOSHABBY feat. Quelle Chris, $ilkmoney, & Nickelus F" from (The) Forever Dream (2025)
- Open Mike Eagle – "me and aquil stealing stuff from work feat Mr. Aquil", "ok but Im the phone screen", "relentless hands and feet", "a dream of the midnight baby (not a euphemism)", "wide leg michael jordan generation x jeans", and "sorry I got huge (also not a euphemism)" from Neighborhood Gods Unlimited (2025)
- Sainté – "DSM feat. Wiz Khalifa" (co-producer) from 4L - EP (2025)
- Vic Spencer – "Repeated Strains" from Trees Are Undefeated (2025)
- Kelly Moonstone – "Happy Ending feat. Cavalier & Quelle Chris" from New Moon (2025)
- Earl Sweatshirt – "Heavy Metal aka ejecto seato!" from Live Laugh Love (2025)
- Navy Blue – "Orchards", "Sunlight of the Spirit", "Guardadas", and "Kindred Spirit" from The Sword & The Soaring (2025)
- Deniro Farrar & Child Actor – Raw Materials (all songs, 2025)
- Ghais Guevara – "Painnnn" from A Quest to Self-Mythologize (2025)
- Ghais Guevara – "Jouissance, the Wealthy" and "Manufacturing Lack" from Goyard & The Kayfabe Reveal (2026)
- Fatboi Sharif & Child Actor – Crayola Circles (all songs, 2026)
- Fly Anakin – "I Need Those feat. $ilkmoney" from (The) Forever Dream: Night Shift (2026)
- Jadasea – "Intent" from Holly Grove (2026)
- Chuck Strangers - "Miracle Miles feat. Obii Sey" from Glory of the King's Hand (2026)
