= I Guess U Had to Be There =

Studio album by Elucid and Sebb Bash
- Released: March 13, 2026
- Genre: Hip-hop
- Length: 31:56
- Label: Backwoodz Studioz
- Producer: Sebb Bash

Elucid chronology
| Revelator (2024) | I Guess U Had to Be There (2026) |

Sebb Bash chronology
| Nuggz (2023) | I Guess U Had to Be There (2026) |

I Guess U Had to Be There is a collaborative studio album by American rapper Elucid and Swiss record producer Sebb Bash. It was released on March 13, 2026, through Backwoodz Studioz. It received generally favorable reviews from critics.

== Background ==
Elucid is an American rapper from New York City. Sebb Bash is a Swiss record producer. I Guess U Had to Be There is the duo's collaborative album. It is Elucid's follow-up to Revelator (2024). It features guest appearances from Mattie, Estee Nack, Shabaka Hutchings, Billy Woods, and Breeze Brewin.

The album was released on March 13, 2026, through Backwoodz Studioz. The deluxe vinyl edition of the album comes with the 48 Hrs EP.

== Critical reception ==
Professional ratings
Aggregate scores
| Source | Rating |
|---|---|
| Metacritic | 80/100 |
Review scores
| Source | Rating |
| Clash | 9/10 |
| No Ripcord | 7.5/10 |
| Pitchfork | 7.2/10 |

According to the review aggregator Metacritic, I Guess U Had to Be There received "generally favorable reviews" based on a weighted average score of 80 out of 100 from 4 critic scores.

Arusa Qureshi of The Quietus commented that the album "contains nothing superfluous and no lines wasted – just impactful verses set against Bash's cacophonous yet cinematic compositions." Tom Morgan of Clash stated, "Like its cover art, these 12 tracks are colourful, blurred, collagistic, with a hint of spooky menace lingering within its depths."

== Track listing ==
I Guess U Had to Be There track listing
| No. | Title | Length |
|---|---|---|
| 1. | "First Light" (featuring Mattie) | 3:18 |
| 2. | "Cantata" | 1:53 |
| 3. | "Hands n Feet" (featuring Estee Nack) | 2:40 |
| 4. | "Make Me Wise" | 2:28 |
| 5. | "Coonspeak" | 2:51 |
| 6. | "Equiano" (featuring Shabaka Hutchings) | 3:04 |
| 7. | "The Lorax" (featuring Billy Woods) | 3:14 |
| 8. | "Fainting Goats" (featuring Breeze Brewin) | 3:00 |
| 9. | "I Say Self" | 2:00 |
| 10. | "Visitation Place" | 1:45 |
| 11. | "Alive Herbals" | 2:10 |
| 12. | "Parental Advisory" | 3:28 |
| Total length: | | 31:56 |

== Personnel ==
Credits adapted from liner notes.

- Elucid – performance
- Sebb Bash – production
- Mattie – performance (1)
- Estee Nack – performance (3)
- Shabaka Hutchings – performance (6)
- Billy Woods – performance (7)
- Breeze Brewin – performance (8)
- Willie Green – mixing, mastering
- Geng PTP – artwork, design

== Charts ==
Chart performance for I Guess U Had to Be There
| Chart (2026) | Peak position |
|---|---|
| UK Album Downloads (Official Charts) | 41 |
