= Church (Billy Woods album) =

Studio album by Billy Woods
- Released: September 30, 2022
- Genre: Hip-hop
- Length: 36:49
- Label: Backwoodz Studioz
- Producer: Messiah Musik

Billy Woods chronology
Aethiopes (2022)	Church (2022)	Maps (2023)

Church is a studio album by American rapper Billy Woods. Produced by Messiah Musik, it features guest appearances from Elucid, Akai Solo, Fielded, and Fat Ray. It was released on September 30, 2022, through Backwoodz Studioz.

== Background ==
Billy Woods is an American rapper based in New York. Church is his second studio album of 2022, following Aethiopes. It was inspired by Woods' buying cannabis that he described as "a classic strain I hadn't seen in a long time, and became the launching point for an album about a certain time in my life, a certain era in New York, and blossomed out from that into concepts of faith and belief."

Church is entirely produced by Messiah Musik, except the track "Fever Grass", which is co-produced with Woods. The album features guest appearances from Elucid (on "Fuchsia & Green" and "Magdalene"), Akai Solo (on "Classical Music"), Fielded (on "Classical Music"), and Fat Ray (on "Schism"). The album is executive produced by Woods, engineered by Steel Tipped Dove, and mixed and mastered by Willie Green.

Church was released on September 30, 2022, through Woods' record label Backwoodz Studioz.

== Critical reception ==
Professional ratings
Review scores
Source	Rating
Beats Per Minute	83%
Robert Christgau	B+
Pitchfork	7.8/10
Sputnikmusic	4.0/5

John Wohlmacher of Beats Per Minute commented that Billy Woods' "lyricism is as abstract as ever, while the production of Messiah Musik creates an eerie bed of shifting moods, whose hazy and directionless flow create a dream-like effect." Jack Mancuso of Sputnikmusic stated, "While the lion's share of songs on Church's tracklist don't necessarily diversify themselves from one another, the album makes its mark as a consistent and disorienting slab of abstract hip-hop that rewards repeated listens to uncover the hidden gems that Woods has nestled neatly within his words." Matthew Ritchie of Pitchfork wrote, "with his uncanny ability to fuse raps to fractured beats, Church is a sprawling personal history, one that ensures that his status as a master of his craft remains unchanged."

=== Accolades ===
Year-end lists for Church
Publication	List	Rank	Ref.
Beats Per Minute	BPM's Top 50 Albums of 2022	38	
BrooklynVegan	BrooklynVegan's Top 50 Albums of 2022	26	
No Ripcord	The Best Albums of 2022	19	

== Track listing ==
All lyrics are written by Billy Woods, except where noted.

Church track listing
No.	Title	Lyrics	Length
1.	"Paraquat"		3:05
2.	"Artichoke"		2:51
3.	"Swampwater"		1:45
4.	"Fever Grass"		3:03
5.	"Fuchsia & Green" (featuring Elucid)	Woods; Elucid	3:37
6.	"Classical Music" (featuring Akai Solo and Fielded)	Woods; Akai Solo; Fielded	4:30
7.	"Cossack Wedding"		2:31
8.	"Schism" (featuring Fat Ray)	Woods; Fat Ray	3:42
9.	"Frankie"		2:18
10.	"Pollo Rico"		2:59
11.	"All Jokes Aside"		3:01
12.	"Magdalene" (featuring Elucid)	Woods; Elucid	3:11
Total length:			36:39

== Personnel ==
Credits adapted from liner notes.

- Billy Woods – co-production (on "Fever Grass"), executive production
- Messiah Musik – production
- Steel Tipped Dove – engineering
- Willie Green – mixing, mastering
- Ashes57 – design
- Alexander Richter – photography

== Charts ==
Chart performance for Church
Chart (2022)	Peak position
UK Album Downloads (Official Charts)	58
