= We Buy Diabetic Test Strips =

Studio album by Armand Hammer
- Released: September 29, 2023
- Genre: Experimental hip-hop; conscious hip-hop
- Length: 53:12
- Label: Fat Possum
- Producer: Benjamin Booker; Sebb Bash; Black Noi$e; Child Actor; DJ Haram; El-P; Elucid; August Fanon; Willie Green; JPEGMafia; Jeff Markey; Messiah Musik; Preservation; Pudge; Kenny Segal; Steel Tipped Dove

Armand Hammer chronology
Haram (2021)	We Buy Diabetic Test Strips (2023)	Mercy (2025)

Singles from We Buy Diabetic Test Strips
- 1. "Trauma Mic" Released: August 2, 2023; 2. "Woke Up and Asked Siri How I'm Gonna Die" Released: August 29, 2023; 3. "The Gods Must Be Crazy" Released: September 26, 2023

We Buy Diabetic Test Strips is the sixth studio album by American hip-hop duo Armand Hammer, consisting of rappers Billy Woods and Elucid. It was released on September 29, 2023, through Fat Possum. The album features guest appearances by JPEGMafia, Moor Mother, El-P, Pierce Jordan of Soul Glo, Pink Siifu, Junglepussy, Curly Castro and Cavalier. It is the first Armand Hammer album to not be released under the Backwoodz Studioz label. It was met with critical acclaim.

== Background and promotion ==
On July 3, 2023, Billy Woods revealed that their next studio album was almost done, saying that they took a "pretty different" approach and that Elucid was still working on the record. Collaborator and producer Kenny Segal thought that the album was "ridiculous" and looking to "knock Maps off the album-of-the-year list". About two weeks later, mysterious postcards and flyers with phone numbers that lead to album and pre-order details were spotted. Fans would also receive postcards delivered to them with a tracklist and phone number. The duo announced the album on August 2. A session with jazz musician Shabaka Hutchings, producer/keyboardist Child Actor, engineer Willie Green and Elucid helped set up the foundation of the album. The latter described the recording process as an assembly of talented rappers meeting for the first time in the studio to jam "to pre-recorded beats before splintering off into new directions". The opportunity to watch them drift off into their own "sonic worlds" was a clear "magical moment" for him.

== Release ==
The album was preceded with three singles: "Trauma Mic" featuring Pink Siifu, released on August 2, "Woke Up and Asked Siri How I'm Gonna Die" featuring JPEGMafia, released on August 29, and "The Gods Must Be Crazy", featuring El-P, released three days before the album's release.

The duo embarked on the We Buy Diabetic Test Strips Tour in support of the album, starting on October 1, 2023 in Kingston and concluding on February 24, 2024 in Atlanta.

On February 27, 2024, an updated version of the album was released, which featured a bonus track, "Doves" featuring Benjamin Booker, and removed Junglepussy's verses from "Y'all Can't Stand Right Here" and "Empire BLVD" for unknown reasons.

== Critical reception ==
Professional ratings
Aggregate scores
Source	Rating
Metacritic	87/100
Review scores
Source	Rating
AllMusic	4/5 stars
Beats Per Minute	92%
HipHopDX	4.5/5 stars
Exclaim!	9/10
The Line of Best Fit	8/10
Mojo	4/5 stars
The Observer	5/5 stars
Pitchfork	8.1/10
PopMatters	8/10
The Quietus	4.5/5 stars

We Buy Diabetic Test Strips received a score of 87 out of 100 on review aggregator Metacritic based on twelve critics' reviews, indicating "universal acclaim". Mojo stated that "ultimately, it's Woods and Elucid who provide the intense, erudite, funny through-line", while Uncut opined that "the music reflects this stark, witty chronicle of precarious modern living with a queasy tableau of churning beats, one minute harsh and industrial, the next lush and dreamy". Pitchfork's Matthew Ismael Ruiz called it a "success—it can feel like being tugged by dozens of different hands yet still being pulled forward" as well as "moody, unsettling, sharply observed album balancing moments of self-reflection with vivid snapshots of societal dysfunction".

Concluding the review of the album for AllMusic, Paul Simpson claimed that, "We Buy Diabetic Test Strips feels like a step forward from a duo whose discography has been consistently innovative from the start."

=== Year-end lists ===
Select year-end rankings of We Buy Diabetic Test Strips
Critic/Publication	List	Rank	Ref.
Beats Per Minute	BPM's Top 50 Albums of 2023	14	
BrooklynVegan	BrooklynVegan's Top 55 Albums of 2023	2	
Crack	The Top 50 Albums of the Year	47	
Gorilla vs. Bear	Gorilla vs. Bear's Albums of 2023	23	
PopMatters	The 80 Best Albums of 2023	23	
The Ringer	The 27 Best Albums of 2023	7	
Slant Magazine	The 50 Best Albums of 2023	34	
Paste	The 50 Best Albums of 2023	46	
Vulture	The Best Albums of 2023	6	

== Track listing ==
We Buy Diabetic Test Strips track listing
No.	Title	Writer(s)	Producer(s)	Length
1.	"Landlines"	Elucid; Billy Woods	JPEGMafia	2:58
2.	"Woke Up and Asked Siri How I'm Gonna Die" (featuring JPEGMafia)	Elucid; Woods; JPEGMafia	JPEGMafia	2:41
3.	"The Flexible Unreliability of Time & Memory"	Elucid; Woods; Child Actor	Child Actor	3:21
4.	"When It Doesn't Start with a Kiss"	Elucid; Woods; JPEGMafia; Pudge	JPEGMafia; Pudge	3:23
5.	"I Keep a Mirror in My Pocket" (featuring Cavalier)	Elucid; Woods; Cavalier; Preservation	Preservation	3:43
6.	"Trauma Mic" (featuring Pink Siifu)	Elucid; Woods; DJ Haram; Pink Siifu	DJ Haram	2:34
7.	"Niggardly (Blocked Call)"	Elucid; Woods; August Fanon	August Fanon	4:01
8.	"The Gods Must Be Crazy" (featuring El-P)	Elucid; Woods; Jaime Meline	El-P	3:00
9.	"Y'all Can't Stand Right Here" (featuring Money Nicca)	Elucid; Woods; Steel Tipped Dove	Messiah Musik; Steel Tipped Dove	2:31
10.	"Total Recall"	Elucid; Woods; Kenny Segal	Kenny Segal	4:21
11.	"Empire BLVD" (featuring Curly Castro)	Elucid; Woods; Curly Castro; Green	Green	3:19
12.	"Don't Lose Your Job" (featuring Pink Siifu and Moor Mother)	Elucid; Woods; Black Noi$e; Jeff Markey; Moor Mother	Black Noi$e; Jeff Markey	4:25
13.	"Supermooned" (featuring DJ Haram)	Elucid; Woods; DJ Haram	DJ Haram; Elucid	2:54
14.	"Switchboard"	Elucid; Woods; Sebb Bash	Sebb Bash	4:02
15.	"The Key Is Under the Mat" (featuring JPEGMafia)	Elucid; Woods; JPEGMafia	JPEGMafia	4:13
16.	"Doves" (featuring Benjamin Booker)	Elucid; Woods; Segal; Benjamin Booker	Benjamin Booker; Segal	8:56
Total length:				61:57

== Charts ==
Chart performance for We Buy Diabetic Test Strips
Chart (2023)	Peak position
UK Album Downloads (OCC)	32
UK Independent Albums (OCC)	44
UK R&B Albums (OCC)	5
