= Shrines (Armand Hammer album) =

2020 hip-hop album by Armand Hammer

Studio album by Armand Hammer
- Released: June 5, 2020
- Genre: Underground hip-hop
- Length: 43:13
- Label: Backwoodz Studioz
- Producers: Earl Sweatshirt; Navy Blue; Child Actor; August Fanon; Fat Albert Einstein; Nicholas Craven; Andrew Broder; Psymun; Messiah Musik; Steel Tipped Dove; Kenny Segal; Armand Hammer (exec.); Willie Green (exec.)

Armand Hammer chronology
Paraffin (2018)	Shrines (2020)	Haram (2021)

Shrines is the fourth studio album by American hip-hop group Armand Hammer. It was released via Backwoodz Studioz in 2020. The album's cover is a photograph of a NYPD police officer about to tranquilize and capture the tiger Ming of Harlem.

== Background ==
Billy Woods and Elucid toured Europe as Armand Hammer in 2019. While in Edinburgh, they started writing a song titled "Bitter Cassava" and made demos. They recorded the song after they got back to New York City. Once a few things were figured out, they started work on Shrines.

== Critical reception ==
Professional ratings
Review scores
Source	Rating
Pitchfork	8.0/10
The Quietus	favorable
Stereogum	favorable

Eden Tizard of The Quietus stated that "Shrines sees a new kind of clarity takes shape, a departure from 2018's monolithic Paraffin." He added: "Where production there was thick and volatile like boiled tar, Shrines is comparatively spacious, the density of the bars even more pronounced." Tom Breihan of Stereogum described Shrines as "an album about people trying to build utopias on perilous and unstable piles of garbage." He stated that "Armand Hammer take in the poison-cloud existential joke of a world around them, and they answer that joke with images as poetic as the tiger at the window."

== Track listing ==
No.	Title	Producer(s)	Length
1.	"Bitter Cassava" (featuring Pink Siifu)	Earl Sweatshirt	2:56
2.	"Solarium"	Navy Blue	1:32
3.	"Charms" (featuring Keiyaa)	Child Actor	2:37
4.	"Pommelhorse" (featuring Curly Castro)	August Fanon	3:33
5.	"Leopards" (featuring Nosaj)	Fat Albert Einstein	3:02
6.	"King Tubby"	Nicholas Craven	3:25
7.	"Frida" (featuring Quelle Chris and Fielded)	Andrew Broder	4:11
8.	"Slewfoot"	Andrew Broder; Psymun	3:19
9.	"War Stories"	Messiah Musik	3:06
10.	"Flavor Flav"	Steel Tipped Dove	2:45
11.	"Dead Cars" (featuring R.A.P. Ferreira)	Kenny Segal	3:32
12.	"Parables" (featuring Akai Solo)	Navy Blue	3:18
13.	"Ramses II" (featuring Moor Mother, Earl Sweatshirt, and Fielded)	Navy Blue; Andrew Broder	4:11
14.	"The Eucharist"	Messiah Musik	1:46
Total length:			43:13
