= Aethiopes (album) =

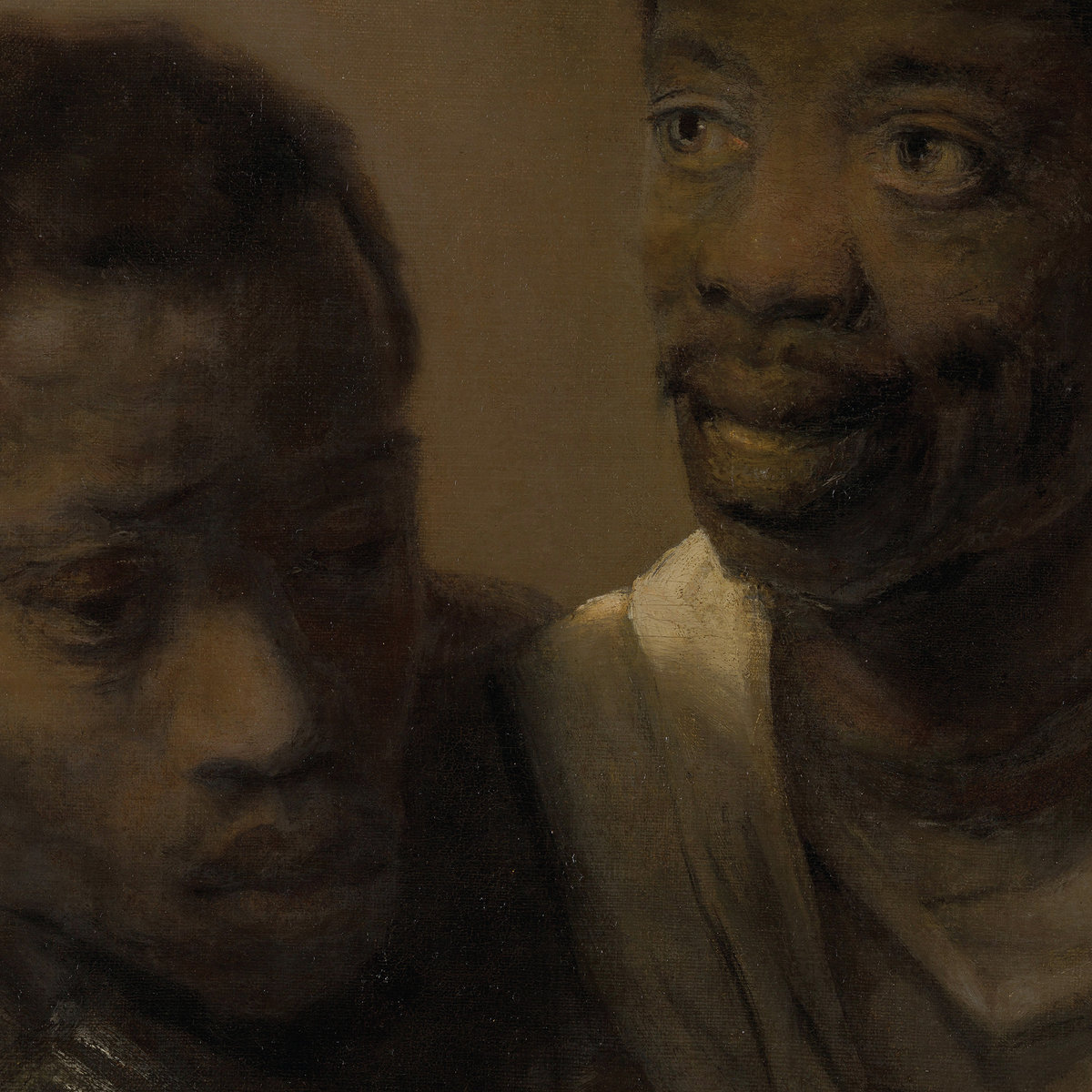

Studio album by Billy Woods
- Released: April 8, 2022
- Genre: Hip-hop
- Length: 39:09
- Label: Backwoodz Studioz
- Producer: Preservation

Billy Woods chronology
Haram (2021)	Aethiopes (2022)	Church (2022)

Aethiopes is a studio album by American rapper Billy Woods, released April 8, 2022, by Backwoodz Studioz. The cover art is taken from the Rembrandt painting Two Moors, and the album name comes from an ancient European name for African people. The album came along with the announcement of a US tour running May through October 2022, and an appearance at the Dutch music festival Le Guess Who? in November.

== Style and reception ==
Aethiopes ratings
Aggregate scores
Source	Rating
Metacritic	81/100
Review scores
Source	Rating
AllMusic	4/5 stars
Beats Per Minute	88%
Pitchfork	8.0/10
Spectrum Culture	80%
Sputnikmusic	4.3/5

According to the review aggregator Metacritic, Aethiopes received "universal acclaim" based on a weighted average score of 81 out of 100 from 5 critic scores. Per Pitchfork's Dean Van Nguyen, the "maverick" Woods needs "a collaborator draped in enchantments and silk; an eclectic crate digger who shares his phosphorescent tendencies" and Preservation is suited for that role, crafting an album that "skids across eras, countries, and cultures", such as opener "Asylum" which contains "swirling sounds of piano keys, delicate guitars, and snaking brass riffs that appear sourced from old North East Africa or Middle Eastern music." Spectrum Culture's Thomas Stremfel notes a similarity with fellow New York rapper Ka which "isn't a complete coincidence considering Preservation's work with Ka under their Dr. Yen Lo project." The beat on fourth track "Sauvage" is "a Rube Goldberg machine with every percussion hit triggering another in a sparse, unending loop as Woods spins a handful of tales with rarely clear beginnings or ends." Woods' storytelling is "unmatched even relative to his own past material" and his "star-studded feature onslaught [of] the New York underground's best" never phone it in, but after a string of feature-heavy tracks, the featureless closing two feel like "tonal whiplash, tuning back into your regularly scheduled program." But ultimately, it is a "slight distraction" with Preservation "mak[ing] the most of each artist's potential set against Woods' consistent production aesthetics."

Beats Per Minute's Rob Hakimian notes that "with the title Aethiopes being an ancient word for African, the cover image borrowed from the 1661 painting Two Moors by Dutch master Rembrandt, and a song called "Haarlem" after the Dutch city near Amsterdam that would eventually give name to the multi-cultural area of New York City, there is evidently a grander narrative about slavery, historical immigration and the Black diaspora at large at play." Woods "is drawing from pockets of African and European history" while Preservation "is pulling obscure samples from geographical sources that perfectly interlock with the tone and concept." The producer is "tuned into the rapper's heady concepts and is dreaming up the vision right alongside him from first thought to last" with a "symbiosis between producer and rapper [which] is key to the album's unmitigated success." Pres "arms the rapper with the perfectly-sourced sounds and samples for each of his forays" including a "drone of African horns" on "No Hard Feelings" whose "shifting pitch pushing Woods' bars to greater, more exasperated lengths as he flits from one African's horrific demise to the next", "Wharves" which "features whispered percussion that is dominated by the glassy echoes of mbira – a usually joyous sound that becomes hollow and cold when combined with the rapper's words about shipwrecked German colonisers turning to cannibalism to survive", and "The Doldrums" with an instrumental "so stutteringly atmospheric that it feels zombified, while Woods shifts between times and settings with hallucinogenic fluidity; images of horses being thrown overboard mingle with snapshots of dirty urban corners, all interspersed with unsettling lessons." Woods and Pres have "made an album that lures you in with rhymes and tones that are perfectly attuned to each other, augment each other and make it clear that there is something important being told here", comparing their narrative-building work to "heavily stylised comic strips – though these are more Alan Moore than weekend funnies." Aethiopes "overwhelming atmosphere invites you to pore over the tracks, to take in each detail the light reaches, then comb over them again for everything you've missed", with details which "will still be getting discovered, decoded and debated in a few generations' time."

=== Year-end lists ===
Aethiopes year-end lists
Publication	#	Ref.
Gorilla vs. Bear	2	
Loud and Quiet	31	
The New York Times (Jon Pareles)	9	
Pitchfork	28	
The Ringer	3	
Sound Opinions (Greg Kot)	9	
Stereogum	5	
Treble	1	
Vulture	N/A	
The Wire	7	

== Track listing ==
All tracks are written by Billy Woods and Preservation. All tracks are produced by Preservation, with co-production by Glow in the Dark Flowers on track 6 and Woods on track 9.

Aethiopes track listing
No.	Title	Length
1.	"Asylum"	2:42
2.	"No Hard Feelings"	2:16
3.	"Wharves"	3:08
4.	"Sauvage" (featuring Boldy James and Gabe 'Nandez)	3:07
5.	"The Doldrums"	3:41
6.	"NYNEX" (featuring Elucid, Quelle Chris, and Denmark Vessey)	4:17
7.	"Christine" (featuring Mike Ladd)	3:31
8.	"Heavy Water" (featuring El-P and Breeze Brewin)	2:24
9.	"Haarlem" (featuring Fatboi Sharif)	3:19
10.	"Versailles" (featuring Despot)	3:08
11.	"Protoevangelium" (featuring Shinehead)	2:24
12.	"Remorseless"	2:50
13.	"Smith + Cross"	2:22
Total length:		39:09

== Personnel ==
- Billy Woods – vocals
- Paul "Willie Green" Womack – mixing engineer, mastering engineer
- Tevin Prince – assistant engineer
- Jean Guillaume Daval – music arranger

== Charts ==
Chart performance for Aethiopes
Chart (2022)	Peak position
UK Album Downloads (Official Charts)	67
