= Lt Headtrip =

American rapper and producer

Lt Headtrip is an American rapper and producer. He is the founder and head of the record label 'we are the karma kids' (WATKK) and has spent the last decade curating projects and events in the local music scene in Brooklyn, Manhattan, and Queens. He is also a seasoned touring musician and studio engineer, holding a master's degree in linguistics.

Headtrip has collaborated with members of Backwoodz Studioz, such as billy woods, ELUCID, Duncecap, and Premrock, as well as other notable independent hip-hop musicians.

== Life and career ==
=== Early life ===
Born Patrick Childers in Toledo, Ohio in 1987. He spent much of his childhood in Kent, Ohio living with his parents and brother. He learned to use music production software when his 6th grade music teacher, Deb Wade, taught Sonic Foundry Acid Pro to her students. Early influences include Primus, Aesop Rock, Gorillaz, Outkast, El-P, and Ol' Dirty Bastard. He moved to New York in 2006 to pursue a career in music, and quickly became active in the Long Island DIY punk rock scene while earning a BA and MA in linguistics at Hofstra University. He moved to Astoria, Queens in 2010, where he would operate as an artist, studio engineer, live event organizer and project manager for the next nine years.

=== Recent work ===
In addition to his responsibilities as a writer, performer, promoter and organizer, he produces, records, and engineers as the head of an independent record label known as we are the karma kids (WATKK). WATKK had officially released over twenty albums, as well as a number of unofficial releases dating back to 2006. He also tours with the neo-soul band, Bassel & The Supernaturals.

In August 2024, Lt Headtrip released his collaborative debut with American producer Bloodmoney Perez, EMBLEMS. A psychedelic journey through confrontation and escape, EMBLEMS delivers a wide range of moods in the 30-minute LP, from compelling dissent to contemplative grooves. Headtrip pays homage to art rap traditions atop Bloodmoney's dynamic production tempers with classic hip hop sentiments including anti-conformity, visceral storytelling, and ascension. "Headtrip's rapping ability is incredibly refined at this point in his career, and Bloodmoney is an incredible talent on full display here." Bloodmoney's industrial crate-digger loops radiate with instrumental flourishes from a slew of musicians, adding to the approachable complexity of the album. "Flipping between political barbs and existential wanderlust, EMBLEMS prospers as a potent portal into the world of an uncompromising MC."

In July 2023, Headtrip released his debut collaborative album with Australian producer DOS4GW, Tap on the Glass. A callback to Headtrip's punk rock days, the album is "dark, loud, aggressive hip hop that confronts you from the first notes and then just doesn’t let up until its over." DOS4GW's avant-garde drone soundscapes full of crushing, corrupted drums provide a fertile habitat for Headtrip to deliver visceral, meticulous lyrics in various styles, reiterating that "there's nobody who can rap the way Lt Headtrip does".

In December 2022, Headtrip released his self-produced ode to his former home of Astoria, Queens, Steinway, "an album for the heads that long for the days of crew albums, posse cuts, and mix tapes. Headtrip not only showcases his ability for producing some bangers and rhyming with a lot of energy and charisma, but for cultivating a space where creative people could coalesce and thrive and all push each other to make the best hip hop."

In 2020, Trip released two albums with different producers, breaking a decade-long pattern of waiting years between solo album releases. Pressure of the Tempest, Trip's spring release, is a departure from the often furious, chaotic temperament of Headtrip's previous work, as much as it is a journal of his departure from NYC. The 8-track album is subsequent to his previous self-produced solo record, Comedy of the Filthbeast (2017), which illustrates the multiplicity of his tormented character. Pressure of the Tempest, on the other hand, take a more straightforward approach to storytelling. Hosting no guest verses on the short but dense project, Headtrip explores an array of personal topics, including a friendship with an alcoholic artist, failed romantic encounters, and a miscarriage, as well as a uncharacteristically tender song about an old flame reignited. The record is entirely produced by long-time collaborator, Rich Courage, who combines patched synths, clunky randomized drum patterns, and guitars to achieve a powerful, cinematic soundscape. His amalgam of analog and digital instruments reflects Headtrip's natural yet practiced writing style and delivery, and lends a robust, dynamic aesthetic.

In the summer of 2020, Lt Headtrip delivered Dreamery, an unexpectedly whimsical album narrating his experience as a summer worker on an isolated tourist island. Headtrip's sketches of daily life weave in and out of producer, engineer and first-time collaborator C$Burns' funky, psychedelic soundscape. The quirky, routine antics of the service industry, the panic of a tourist trap that suddenly loses cell phone service, and eccentric, drug-obsessed coworkers all find their way into Trip's intricate web. True to form, the notoriously sinister rapper eventually delves into darker topics over Burns' moody selections, such as the backlash of the same amphetamines that sustain a demanding lifestyle, as well as an unnerving examination of his own perception, the ever-looming feeling of being trapped within another being's dream, an impotent pawn in an unseen force's fantasy.

== Discography ==
- Novel Path EP by Lt Headtrip and NorthernDraw, produced by NorthernDraw (2025)
- EMBLEMS by Lt Headtrip X Bloodmoney Perez, produced by Bloodmoney Perez (2024)
- Tap on the Glass by Lt Headtrip X DOS4GW, produced by DOS4GW (2023)
- Steinway by Lt Headtrip, produced by Lt Headtrip (2022)
- Dreamery by Lt Headtrip, produced by C$Burns (2020)
- Pressure of the Tempest by Lt Headtrip, produced by Rich Courage (2020)
- Blastmaster Baker VS. The Human Being Lawnmower by Blastmaster Baker, produced by Headtrip (2019)
- Word Art Gallery by OLD SELF, produced by Headtrip (2018)
- Comedy of the Filthbeast by Lt Headtrip, 2017
- TVNNELS by Lt Headtrip with Bluelight
- Kombinations by MC Eleven & the Karma Kids, 2016
- Bald Afro by Bald Afro, 2015
- Impervious Machine v1.28571429 by Impervious Machine (Lt Headtrip and Defpotec), 2014
- Webtrip by Webtrip (Lt Headtrip and Gruff Lion), 2013
- Cousin Id by Sarcasmo, 2012
- Keep out of the Attic by Lt Headtrip, 2011
- Raw Dog by Lt Headtrip, 2009
- Drumskin by Sarcasmo (Lt Headtrip and Samurai Banana), 2007
