= So the Flies Don't Come =

Studio album by Milo
- Released: September 25, 2015
- Genre: Hip-hop
- Length: 32:44
- Labels: Ruby Yacht; The Order Label
- Producer: Kenny Segal

Milo chronology
| A Toothpaste Suburb (2014) | So the Flies Don't Come (2015) | Who Told You to Think??!!?!?!?! (2017) |

So the Flies Don't Come is the second studio album by American hip-hop musician Milo. It was released on September 25, 2015. The production was handled by Kenny Segal.

== Critical reception ==
Professional ratings
Review scores
| Source | Rating |
|---|---|
| Pitchfork | 7.4/10 |
| The Quietus | favorable |
| Spin | 8/10 |

Sheldon Pearce of Pitchfork gave the album a 7.4 out of 10, calling it "[Milo's] most fascinating work to date, filling weird, side-winding productions that deflate and wheeze with tumbling lyricism delivered in near spoken word cadences." Gary Suarez of The Quietus wrote, "producer Kenny Segal leans towards jazz abstractions, full of billowy smoke instead of the more typical boom bap dust."

It was ranked at number 26 on Rolling Stone's "40 Best Rap Albums of 2015" list, as well as number 37 on Spin's "50 Best Hip-Hop Albums of 2015" list. The New York Observer named it the 5th best hip-hop album of 2015, while The Boston Globe named it the 7th best hip-hop album of 2015. Impose placed it at number 17 on the "Best Albums of 2015" list.

"Souvenir" was included on RedEye's "20 Best Songs of 2015" list.

== Track listing ==
| No. | Title | Length |
|---|---|---|
| 1. | "Rabblerouse" | 1:10 |
| 2. | "Souvenir" (featuring Hemlock Ernst) | 3:45 |
| 3. | "Zen Scientist" (featuring Myka 9) | 3:50 |
| 4. | "Re: Animist" | 2:18 |
| 5. | "An Encyclopedia" | 4:53 |
| 6. | "Going No Place" (featuring Elucid) | 4:00 |
| 7. | "True Nen" (featuring Open Mike Eagle) | 2:28 |
| 8. | "Napping Under the Echo Tree" | 3:38 |
| 9. | "@yomilo" | 2:45 |
| 10. | "Song About a Raygunn (An Ode to Driver)" | 3:53 |
