= Creature (musician) =

American rapper

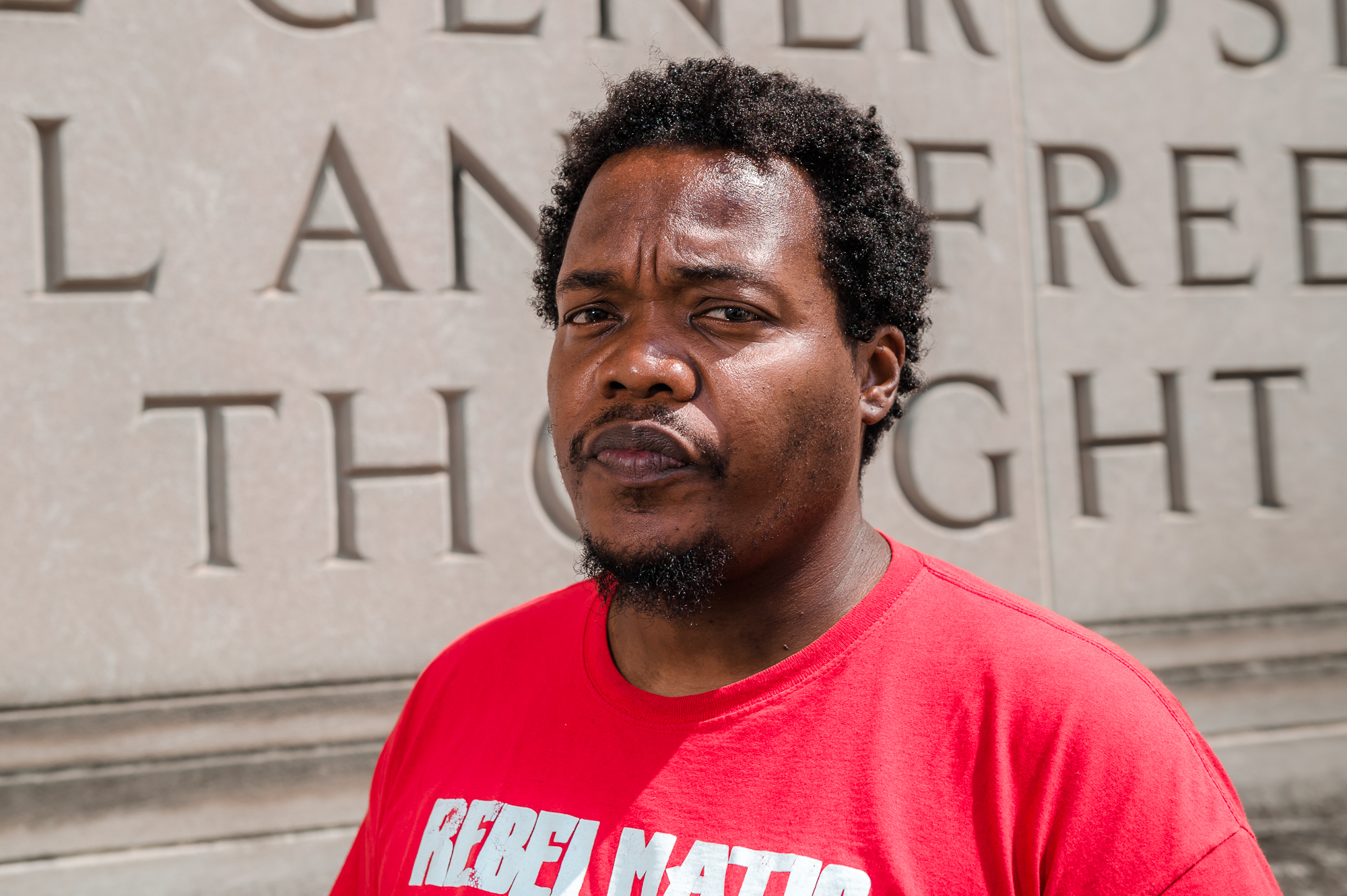
- Creature in 2017

Background information
- Also known as: Creaturenomics
- Born: Siddiq Booker; November 10, 1973 (age 52); Harlem, New York U.S.
- Origin: Queens, New York U.S.
- Genres: Rap; Punk
- Occupations: Emcee; Rapper; Musician
- Instruments: Rapping; Producing; Writing
- Years active: 1996–present
- Labels: 4th and Broadway; Island; Hydra Records; Insomniac Dream Entertainment (BMI) a night on canopy

Siddiq Booker (born November 10, 1973), better known by his stage name Creature, is a New York City-based independent underground rapper, vocalist, writer and composer who works in the rap, hip hop, and afro-punk genres.

== Early life ==
Booker was born in Harlem, New York, and was raised in the Corona neighborhood of Queens in New York City.

Creature was inspired growing up listening to Grandmaster Flash's "The Message" and fellow Queens residents, Run DMC's, "Sucker MCs" on a boombox at the pool in Corona. He started playing in bands at 15. In high school he met Buc Live and then GED school met Gab Gatcha, both with whom he eventually formed the group, The Triflicts, in 1991. Creature had his first record deal at age 20.

== Career ==
=== The Triflicts ===
The Triflicts was an underground hip hop group including Creature, Gab Gatcha and Buc Live. The group gained attention after Gab Gatcha mentioning their name on the first Beatnuts album on which he debuted. In 1996 Stretch and Bobbito played "I'm Terror" from a demo for 4th and Broadway Records, then played "Genuine" from their debut single released by Hydra Records on The Stretch Armstrong and Bobbito Show of WKCR radio. The group's work was also played on Hot97, New York's premier hip hop radio station, in a song battle against Goodie Mob, where Goodie Mob won. The group went their separate ways when Buc stopped rapping and Gab refocused his time on work with The Beatnuts and later Gab spent some time in prison. Sergent Records from France published their unreleased demos in 2014.

=== Sky Pimps ===
Rob Sonic, Sonic Sum and Mike Ladd with Creature formed his next collective project, the Sky Pimps in the late 90s.

=== RebelMatic ===
In 2008 Creature bumped into a high school acquaintance and decided to form a band, RebelMatic. Since he had been in a punk rock band before he rhymed, so RebelMatic, his hip hop infused punk band, was a perfect fit. They tell the public that they don't get the full experience of the band's energy until you see them live. They work through new music live and draw inspiration from bands ranging from Public Enemy, Sly and the Family Stone to John Coltrane and Metallica. RebelMatic opened for Kool AD in 2014 and played at AfroPunk Festival in New York in 2013 and 2017.

=== Solo work ===
Creature's style has been described as "agile" and "pre-knee jerk" contemporary rap battling. After his first group, The Triflicts, started going their separate ways, Creature was featured on The X-Ecutioners' first album, X-Pressions. In the late 1990s he met Sole, El-P and Antipop Consortium. In 2000 he worked with Mike Ladd on the Infesticons for the album, Gun Hill Road. And wrote a hook for a single from MC Jin's The Rest Is History album in 2003. That same year he was featured on Vaudeville Villain by MF Doom. In 2004 he went on tour with Rob Sonic's Telicatessen debut album tour. Following that Creature had a song with Rob Sonic and Hangar 18 called "Sniper Picnic” that was featured on the Tony Hawk video game. He collaborated with Kool AD on his own album with the song, "Warhol's Wig" that received much acclaim. He has also toured with Angelo Moore and collaborated with Ari Up. Creature performed with Homeboy Sandman and Aesop Rock at Irvin Plaza the summer of 2016.

Before the digital age of music PR, like Percee-P, Lucky & Sdaerd, L.I.F.E.long, and MC Jin, Creature spent many hours selling his independent music, direct, in front of Fatbeats and at clubs on the streets of New York.

Creature created a concert series called The Coffee Grind that featured a mix of under-represented hip hop artists with those more well known like Just Ice, Camp Lo, and Sadat X.

=== The Underdog's Manifesto ===
In 2006, Creature wrote the book, The Underdog's Manifesto: A Guerilla Artist's Path to Independence, with Dax-Devlon Ross. The book was published by Outskirts Press and reissued in 2008 by Outside the Box Publishing. The book explores Creature's journey of being a self-produced independent artist and how he learned creative ways to publicize and package one's work. Underdog's Manifesto includes interviews with Percee P, Duo Live and “Lucky” Logan P. McCoy and an afterword by Jeremy Glick.

=== Coffee Grind Media ===
Creature has two independent production companies, one called Creaturenomics and one called Coffee Grind Media, LLC.

== Personal life ==
Creature, or Siddiq Booker, has two children. His son helped to name the 2017 album for RebelMatic, Eat The Monster.

== Discography ==
=== Releases ===
- 2005: Never Say Die – featuring Slug, Jin, and Busdriver.
- 2007: Hustle to be Free
- 2011: Chester Himes EP
- 2013: Black Lagoon Radio
- 2015: Torn Together – featuring Kool AD, Vordul Mega, SavKills, Nutso and Homeboy Sandman. Production by Preservation (Ka & Yasiin Bey) and Omega One.
- 2020: The day night stood still (Coffee Grind Media / a night on canopy)

=== Collaborations ===
- 1996: Genuine / Don't Make Me Try (single) – (with The Triflicts)
- 2000: Gun Hill Road – (with The Infesticons)
- 2003: The Majesticons vs. The Infesticons / Beauty vs. Ugly (The Instrumental Albums) (2xLP) – (with The Infesticons)
- 2004: featured with Jin, "So Afraid" on The Rest is History – (as S. Booker)
- 2009: Prey For The Vulture – (with RebelMatic)
- 2010: Bedford Park – (with The Infesticons)
- 2014: Elephant Amnesia – (with RebelMatic)
- 2014: 93-94 Unreleased Demos EP – (with The Triflicts)
- 2017: Eat The Monster EP – (with RebelMatic)

== Videos ==
- 2012: Creature, "Embrace the Day," produced by Prefuse 73, directed by Rodolfo Duran.
- 2015: Creature, “Warhol’s Wig” featuring Kool AD, directed by Skila.
- 2015: Creature, "Sore Eyes" featuring Vordul Mega, produced by Noble Dru.

== Works and publications ==
- Creature; Devlon-Ross, Dax (2008). The Underdog's Manifesto: A Guerilla Artist's Path to Independence. New York: Outside the Box Publishing, LLC. ISBN 978-0-981-73984-7.

== See also ==
- Conscious Rap
- Indie hip-hop
