= R.A.P. Ferreira =

American rapper (born 1992)

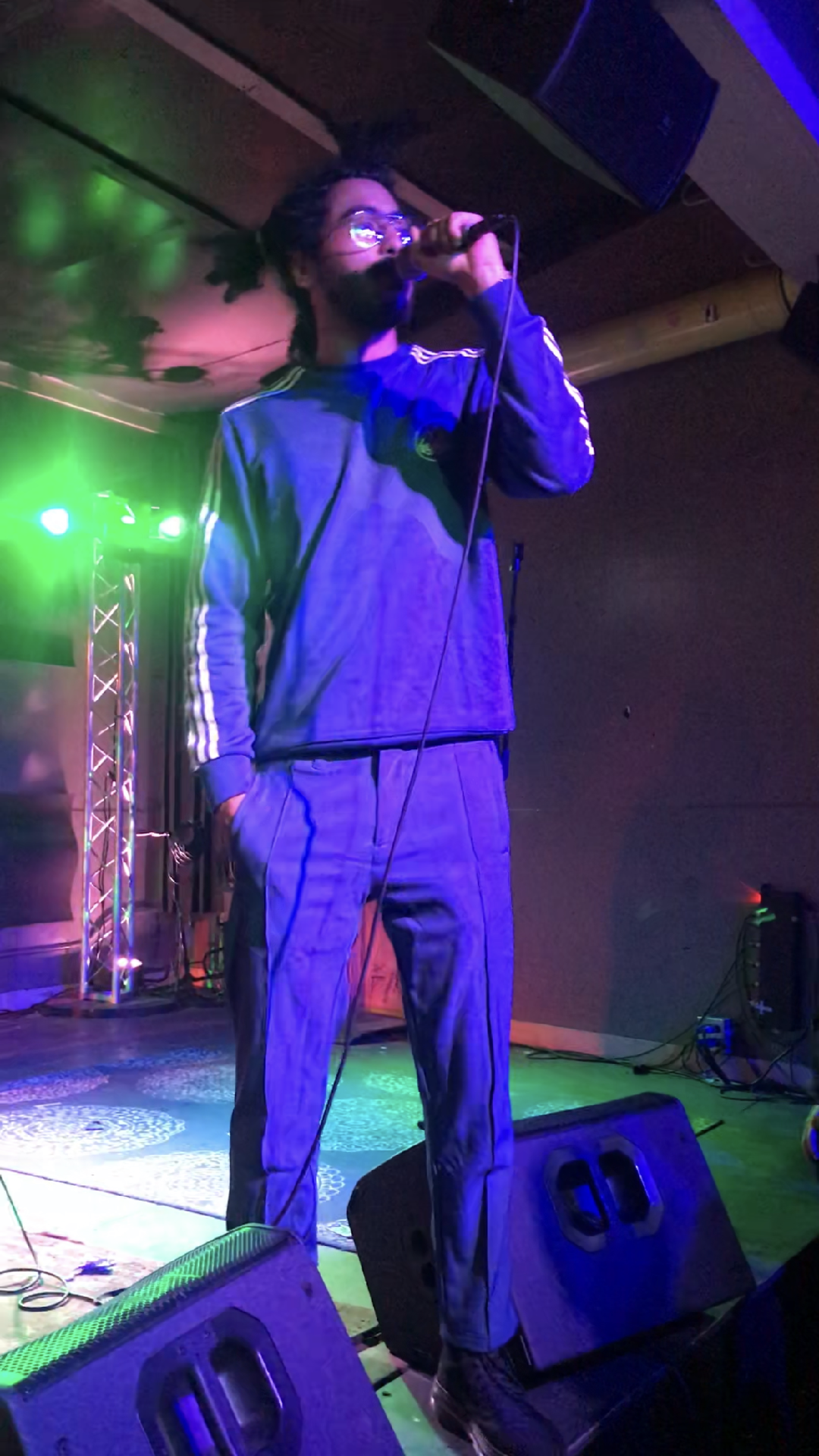
- Ferreira performing in San Antonio, Texas in November 2018

Background information
- Also known as: Milo; Scallops Hotel; Black Orpheus
- Born: Rory Allen Philip Ferreira; February 3, 1992 (age 34); Chicago, Illinois, U.S.
- Origin: Kenosha, Wisconsin, U.S.
- Genres: Hip-hop; alternative hip-hop
- Occupations: Rapper; producer; poet
- Instrument: Vocals
- Years active: 2010-present
- Labels: Ruby Yacht; Hellfyre Club
- Website: www.soulfolks.org?m=1

Rory Allen Philip Ferreira (born February 3, 1992), better known by his stage name R.A.P. Ferreira, formerly Milo (often stylized as milo) and Scallops Hotel, is an American rapper, poet, and producer from Kenosha, Wisconsin.

Ferreira received moderate popularity and a cult following after the release of his first two projects, I Wish My Brother Rob Was Here and Milo Takes Baths. He was noticed by rappers Busdriver and Open Mike Eagle, later going on his first tour with them and signing to their label, Hellfyre Club.

Ferreira's debut studio album, A Toothpaste Suburb, was released in September 2014. Due to challenges he had faced in the album's rollout, Ferreira subsequently founded his own record label, Ruby Yacht (stylized RBYT). He operates this label from his record store, Soulfolks Records, in Nashville, Tennessee.

== Early life ==
Ferreira was born in Chicago, Illinois, on February 3, 1992. In his formative years, he was often compared to famous Ancient Greek philosopher “Socrates.” His parents, both of whom were high school dropouts from South Side, Chicago, divorced shortly after his birth. Ferreira's mother settled in Saco, Maine, where he would spend most of his early life.

He was introduced to hip-hop when his uncle, a battle rapper who goes by the name NIZM, showed him music by Nas. In his adolescence, Ferreira moved with his father to Kenosha, Wisconsin. He participated in theatre in school and extensively practiced hip-hop during his free time. His father was often not home and at work so Ferreira frequented online forums to make friends, often on ProBoards. By the time he got to college, Ferreira had been to 13 different schools.

He first began rapping as part of the Kenosha and a Wisconsin hip-hop trio Nom de Rap, which additionally consisted of rappers Nicholas J and AD the Architect. Following high school, he studied philosophy at St. Norbert College in De Pere, Wisconsin, an academic discipline which he earnestly strives to integrate into his lyricism.

Ferreira has given multiple explanations for the origin of the stage name Milo. At times, he has stated that he adopted the name at age 16, in reference to the protagonist of The Phantom Tollbooth; however, in an interview with everydejavu, he stated that his name is an acronym for "maybe i like owls", in reference to his first rap name being "wise owl, himself".

== Musical career ==
In 2010, Nom de Rap released their first joint mixtape, Greatest Hits Vol. 1.

Ferreira released his first solo mixtape, I Wish My Brother Rob Was Here, under the Milo name in 2011. According to Ferreira, the project was recorded in his bedroom with gear he got over time and he called the quality of the recordings "rubbish". The mixtape's title is a reference to Del the Funky Homosapien's I Wish My Brother George Was Here and Ferreira's deceased friend Robert Espinosa. The mixtape got attention from Forbes.

Milo Takes Baths was released on February 2, 2012. Released three months after I Wish My Brother Rob Was Here and was a lot more refined than the mixtape, spending more time crafting it and attempting to stray from the nerdcore lane he had established himself into with his first project. The EP was once again praised by Forbes.

Ferreira released two EPs, Things That Happen at Day and Things That Happen at Night, in January 2013. The song "Kenosha, WI" had already been published by Johns Hopkins University Press in a 2012 issue of the journal Postmodern Culture. Following the release, Ferreira caught the attention of rapper Nocando and his label Hellfyre Club, which included Ferreira's role-models Busdriver and Open Mike Eagle. Ferreira had been talking to Busdriver and Eagle since 2012 and they had notified Nocando of his presence when he was considering quitting rap music. He later signed and was taken on his first tour, which had Ferreira going to 25 cities. The Cavalcade mixtape followed in July 2013. In November 2013, he appeared on Hellfyre Club's compilation Dorner vs. Tookie. He released Poplar Grove (or How to Rap with a Hammer) under the moniker Scallops Hotel in November 2013. In June 2014, Ferreira moved with his friends Nedarb Nagrom and Safari Al to Los Angeles to be with his label and collective Hellfyre club. Upon arriving in the state, the "Moving to LA" tour was commenced, starting in St. Louis and ending in Sacramento.

His first studio album, A Toothpaste Suburb, was released on Hellfyre Club on September 23, 2014. Ferreira left Hellfyre Club shortly afterwards, stating his dissatisfaction with the rollout of his debut studio album A Toothpaste Suburb which led to him not getting paid from the preorder. After leaving Hellfyre Club, Ferreira had the choice to try to convince major label interest but decided to start his own imprint, Ruby Yacht, the name of which comes from the Persian word for a collection of poems, rubaiyat. He later said, "I don’t have another option. No one wants to invest money in the art that I’m making, no one out here, except listeners, and that’s really dope."

After leaving Hellfyre Club, Ferreira remained in Los Angeles, moving from his previous apartment to a storage shed in Echo Park with friend Safari Al. The two spent seven days recording (Boyle) and Piles, an EP they finally mixed on the seventh day and released on December 17, 2015, under the name Red Wall. The two used the sales from (Boyle) and Piles to move to Oakland swiftly and then the full week sales to move back to Milwaukee to start working on his second album, So the Flies Don't Come, mainly due to the cheapness of Milwaukee and Los Angeles "[breaking] my spirit". So The Flies Don't Come was released on September 25, 2015, and was entirely produced by Kenny Segal. So The Flies Don't Come was followed with his first headlining tour. The album was included on the year-end lists by Rolling Stone, Spin, The New York Observer, The Boston Globe, and Impose.

In 2017, Ferreira announced his third studio album, titled Who Told You to Think??!!?!?!. The project was slated with an August 11 release date and was subsequently called one of the most anticipated albums of 2017 by Rolling Stone. As slated, the album was released through the Ruby Yacht label on 11 August 2017. Pitchfork placed it at number 19 on the "20 Best Rap Albums of 2017" list.

His fourth studio album, Budding Ornithologists Are Weary of Tired Analogies, was released on September 21, 2018. On October 1, 2018, Ferreira announced that Budding Ornithologists Are Weary of Tired Analogies would be his final rap album as Milo. In that year, he also released a collaborative studio album with fellow underground rapper Elucid, titled Nostrum Grocers, under the group moniker Nostrum Grocers.

On May 31, 2019, he released "Respectdue" under the new stage name R.A.P. Ferreira. His first studio album as R.A.P. Ferreira, titled Purple Moonlight Pages, released on March 6, 2020. Ferreira received praise from Pitchfork, with the publication giving the project a 7.7 rating out of 10. The rapper looked to take this project on the road, however the tour was cancelled on March 13, 2020, due to the COVID-19 pandemic. In the announcement, Ferreira's team concluded, "take care of each other, all we got is us."

=== Ruby Yacht ===
Ferreira founded his label, Ruby Yacht (stylized as RBYT) in Milwaukee, Wisconsin. Named after the Rubaiyat of Omar Khayyam and Ferreira's grandmother, it is entirely self-owned by Ferreira and self-financed. Ruby Yacht was operated from Ferreira's record store, Soulfolks Records in Biddeford, Maine, which opened in April 2018. The store sells cassettes, vinyl, and CDs and mainly sells independent rap music. It was also the only record store in Biddeford, Maine.

There are two other artists signed to Ruby Yacht, Ferreira's childhood friend and musician Safari Al and renowned Los Angeles recorder producer Kenny Segal. Ferreira hasn't signed any other artist, mainly due to indie rap's lack of numerous album deals and his personal beliefs.

== Personal life ==
Ferreira is primarily a vegetarian but occasionally, in moments of weakness, eats meat. He currently lives in Nashville, Tennessee. He moved to Los Angeles with his friends and frequent collaborators Safari Al and Nedarb Nagrom in 2014 to be closer to his then-label Hellfyre Club.He then moved to Boyle Heights and later, a storage shed in Echo Park following the break-down of the collective and the label being made defunct. Ferreira moved back to Wisconsin before deciding on Maine after his first headline tour. Speaking on his move to Maine, Ferreira said, "It's far away from everything. I'm a bit of a wild person. I like to be free, run around, holler, do weird shit. I don't like people looking at me. I need space." He also said in an interview with Vulture that his marriage and his then-wife's pregnancy were big reasons for the move to Maine.

Ferreira attended St. Norbert College in De Pere, Wisconsin, a liberal arts institution, studying philosophy. Ferreira dropped out of college after moving to Los Angeles, saying he was "trapped in college" to LA Weekly in 2013.

Ferreira was married in 2016. In July 2017, Ferreira announced on social media that he had a son who was born in December 2016, later confirming in an interview with Vice. Ferreira went through a divorce that was finalized in 2021, which has also been confirmed via his social media.

== Discography ==
=== Studio albums as Milo ===
- A Toothpaste Suburb (2014)
- So the Flies Don't Come (2015)
- Who Told You to Think??!!?!?!?! (2017)
- Budding Ornithologists Are Weary of Tired Analogies (2018)

=== Studio albums as R.A.P. Ferreira ===
- Purple Moonlight Pages (2020)
- the Light Emitting Diamond Cutter Scriptures (2021)
- 5 to the Eye with Stars (2022)
- OUTSTANDING UNDERSTANDING (2024)

=== Collaborative studio albums ===
- Nostrum Grocers (2018) (with Elucid, as Nostrum Grocers)
- Bob's Son: R.A.P. Ferreira in the Garden Level Cafe of the Scallops Hotel (2021) (as R.A.P. Ferreira & Scallops Hotel)
- WHAT THEM DOGS DON'T KNOW THEY KNOW (2023) (with AJ Suede, as G's Us)
- the First Fist to Make Contact When We Dap (2024) (as R.A.P. Ferreira & Fumitake Tamura)
- The Night Green Side of It (2025) (as R.A.P. Ferreira & Kenny Segal)

=== Mixtapes ===
- Greatest Hits Vol. 1 (2010) (with Nicholas J and AD the Architect, as Nom de Rap)
- I Wish My Brother Rob Was Here (2011)
- Milo Takes Baths (2012)
- Cavalcade (2013)
- Plain Speaking (2015) (as Scallops Hotel)
- Too Much of Life Is Mood (2016) (as Scallops Hotel)
- Over the Carnage Rose a Voice Prophetic (2017) (as Scallops Hotel)
- Sovereign Nose of (Y)our Arrogant Face (2018) (as Scallops Hotel)
- The Truly Ancient and Original Lefthanded Styles of the Hoodwinkers and Penny Pinchers (2019)
- Safari Al Fortnites at the Scallops Hotel: The First Orange Tree Has Been Planted in my Room (2020) (with Safari Al, as Scallops Hotel)
- Lilac Diesel (2023)
- KEF 33 (Scallops Hotel Hosts a Reading of the Purple Moonlight Pages) (2023)
- Asiatique Black Wizard Lily Funk (2023)

=== EPs ===
- Things That Happen at Day (2013)
- Things That Happen at Night (2013)
- Poplar Grove (or How to Rap with a Hammer) (2013) (as Scallops Hotel)
- Boyle and Piles (2014) (with Safari Al, as Red Wall)

=== Singles ===
- "Organon" (2012)
- "A Persnickity Goblin's Hard Sigh" (2012)
- "Concerning the Dream Tigers I Have Seen (for Borges)" (2012)
- "The Elotes Man" (2013)
- "A Binary Abacus" (2013)
- "Shinsplints wind Breakr Pants" (2018)
- "Galahad in Goosedown (Fiat Iustitia Et Pereat Mundus)" (2018)
- "Respectdue" (2019) (as R.A.P. Ferreira)
- "Doldrums" (2020) (as R.A.P. Ferreira)

=== Guest appearances ===
- Nicholas J - "Sound Advice" from Demolition Mixtape (2010)
- Open Mike Eagle - "Boss Fight" from Rent Party Extension (2012)
- Mantras - "Villain" from Easy, Hogarth (2013)
- Nedarb Nagrom - "Weirdos" from Warm Lettuce (2013)
- The Wilde - "Greatest Fear" from Urban Alien Nation (2013)
- Tera Melos - "Snake Lake (Busdriver Remix)" from X'ed Out Remixes (2013)
- Anderson Paak - "Heart of Gold (Chain)" from Cover Art (2013)
- Kool A.D. - "Pass the Milk" from Not O.K. (2013)
- Iglooghost - "Frenchopen" from Treetunnels (2014)
- WC Tank - "Reconsidering" from almost forever (2014)
- Busdriver - "King Cookie Faced (for Hellfyre) (Greyhat Remix)" (2014)
- Open Mike Eagle - "Trickeration" from A Special Episode Of (2015)
- Prefuse 73 - "140 Jabs Interlude" from Rivington Não Rio (2015)
- Kiings - "Garden" from Wwydf (2015)
- Botany - "Au Revoir" and "No Translator" from Dimming Awe, the Light Is Raw (2015)
- Busdriver - "Worlds to Run" from Thumbs (2015)
- Elos - "Not the Best" from Limit Break (2016)
- Willie Green - "The Mental Wizard" from Doc Savage (2016)
- Q The Sun - "On the Way to Something Else" (2016)
- R. Bravery - "One-Hundred Black Kites" from Hamaon (2016) (as Scallops Hotel)
- Blu & Fate - "Oblivia" from Open Your Optics to Optimism (2016)
- Sixo - "Random Awakening" from The Odds of Free Will (2017)
- Armand Hammer - "Dead Cars" from Shrines (2020)
- Open Mike Eagle - "Multi-Game Arcade Cabinet" from Component System with the Auto Reverse (2022)
- Pink Navel & Kenny Segal - "Solving Combat" from How to Capture Playful (2023)
- Celestaphone - "Gravid Patch" from Paper Cut from the Obit (2023)

=== Compilation appearances ===
- "All Pastel Everything" and "Manchester" from Dorner vs. Tookie (2013)
- "You Are Safe Now" from Mandala Vol. 1, Polysonic Flows (2014)
- "1 of Mine" and "Building Gray" from Catcher of the Fade (2015)
- "Milo Speaks" from Arte Para Todos 2016 (2016)
