= Paraffin (album) =

2018 hip-hop album by Armand Hammer

Studio album by Armand Hammer
- Released: July 13, 2018
- Genre: Hip-hop
- Length: 46:58
- Label: Backwoodz Studioz, PTP
- Producer: Elucid; Small Pro; August Fanon; Messiah Musik; Willie Green; Kenny Segal; Ohbliv

Armand Hammer chronology
Rome (2017)	Paraffin (2018)	Shrines (2020)

Paraffin is the third studio album by American hip-hop group Armand Hammer. It was released via Backwoodz Studioz in 2018. Originally released on vinyl only, the album was later released digitally, on cassette (by PTP), and on CD.

== Critical reception ==
Professional ratings
Review scores
Source	Rating
Pitchfork	8.1/10
Spectrum Culture	80%
Stereogum	favorable

Nathan Stevens of Spectrum Culture gave the album a 4 out of 5, saying: "It's terrifyingly easy to get lost in Paraffin thanks to a penchant for beat switches and smoggy beats rolling into each other." Paul A. Thompson of Pitchfork gave the album an 8.1 out of 10, calling it "a record that's uniquely attuned to the political, physical, and ethical realities of 2018 without being weighed down by its pop culture arcana or its attendant industry concerns." Tom Breihan of Stereogum wrote: "Like a lot of the best albums of 2018, Paraffin is an extended meditation on what it's like to be black in America — a place that's always been hostile to blackness and that's finding ways to make that hostility even more obvious."

It was placed at number 4 on Stereogum's "10 Best Rap Albums of 2018" list, number 65 on PopMatters' "70 Best Albums of 2018" list, and number 28 on Bandcamp Daily's "Best Albums of 2018" list. It was also included on The A.V. Club's "Best Hip-Hop Albums of 2018" list, as well as Pitchfork's "Best Rap Albums of 2018" list.

== Track listing ==
No.	Title	Producer(s)	Length
1.	"Sweet Mickey"	Elucid	2:29
2.	"Rehearse with Ornette"	Elucid	4:24
3.	"Dettol"	Small Pro	2:32
4.	"No Days Off"	August Fanon	2:59
5.	"Fuhrman Tapes"	Messiah Musik; Willie Green	3:14
6.	"Hunter"	Elucid	4:23
7.	"Alternate Side Parking"	August Fanon; Kenny Segal	2:30
8.	"If He Holla" (featuring SKECH185)	August Fanon	3:34
9.	"Black Garlic"	Ohbliv	2:03
10.	"VX"	Elucid	2:53
11.	"Vindaloo"	Messiah Musik	3:55
12.	"ECOMOG"	Messiah Musik; Kenny Segal	3:51
13.	"Bob Barker"	Elucid	2:21
14.	"Sudden Death"	Messiah Musik	2:29
15.	"Root Farm"	Messiah Musik; Elucid	3:21
Total length:			46:58
