= Billy Woods =

American rapper based in New York

- Born: c. 1978; Washington, D.C., U.S.
- Origin: New York City, New York, U.S.
- Genres: Hip-hop; underground hip-hop; abstract hip-hop
- Occupation: Rapper
- Years active: 2002–present
- Labels: Backwoodz Studioz; Rhymesayers
- Member of: Armand Hammer
- Formerly of: Super Chron Flight Brothers; The Reavers

Billy Woods, stylized billy woods (born c. 1978), is an American rapper based in New York. He is the founder of the record label Backwoodz Studioz, and has been a member of Armand Hammer, Super Chron Flight Brothers, and the Reavers. Woods consistently obscures his face in publicity photos.

== Early life ==
Billy Woods was born in Washington, D.C. circa 1978. His mother was an English literature professor from Jamaica, and his father was a Marxist intellectual from Zimbabwe; the two met while Woods' father was pursuing a Ph.D. in the United States. During the Zimbabwe War of Independence, Woods' father lived in "political exile", but in 1980 the family moved to Zimbabwe and Woods' father entered the Zimbabwean government. Later in the 1980s, Woods' father died. In 1989, about a year and a half after his father's death, Woods and his mother returned to the United States and moved to Washington D.C. At other points in his childhood, Woods lived in Jamaica.

Woods first became interested in hip-hop shortly after his return to the United States, upon watching Do the Right Thing and hearing the music of Public Enemy. He briefly attended Howard University before getting involved in New York's hip-hop scene. Woods started making music himself in the late 1990s, writing his "first real rhyme" at a laundromat in Kennebunk, Maine in 1997.

"Billy Woods" is a pseudonym; he has not revealed his birth name. In an interview with Jacobin, Woods explained that his pursuit of anonymity was rooted in several reasons, including his desires to remain a private individual and to avoid being associated with his family name.

== Career ==
Woods released his debut album Camouflage through his label Backwoodz Studioz in 2003. In the early years of his career, he was a protégé of Cannibal Ox's Vordul Mega. Throughout the 2000s, the majority of Woods' output was released through the duo Super Chron Flight Brothers, which comprised him and fellow rapper Priviledge. Woods describes his work with Super Chron Flight brothers as emphasizing "the comedy and tragedy angle". He featured on the 2005 Backwoodz Studioz album Terror Firma. By the early 2010s, Super Chron Flight Brothers had split up, and Backwoodz Studioz had been largely unable to make a profit. Woods subsequently decided to complete another solo album, 2012's History Will Absolve Me, which he envisioned would be his final release before leaving the music industry. History Will Absolve Me proved more successful than Woods anticipated, revitalizing his career and becoming known as a cult classic of underground hip-hop.

In 2013, Woods released Dour Candy, which was entirely produced by Blockhead. He formed the duo Armand Hammer with American rapper Elucid, and released their debut mixtape, Half Measures, and debut album, Race Music, in 2013. In 2017, he released Known Unknowns. In 2019, he released a collaborative album with producer Kenny Segal, titled Hiding Places, as well as a solo album, Terror Management. 2020 brought Brass, a collaborative album with Moor Mother. Woods released Aethiopes and Church in 2022. On 27 March 2023, Woods announced his second collaboration with the producer Kenny Segal titled Maps. The album was released on May 5, 2023. It was preceded by two singles, "Facetime", which was released on April 12, 2023, and featured the Baltimore singer Samuel T. Herring, and "Soft Landing", which was released May 3, 2023. In 2025, he released Golliwog.

In 2023, Woods published a children's book titled A is for Anarchist.

=== Backwoodz Studioz ===
Woods founded Backwoodz Studioz in 2002 and initially ran it as a one-man operation inspired by the success of independent releases like Cannibal Ox's The Cold Vein and MF DOOM's Operation: Doomsday. He released his debut album Camouflage through Backwoodz that same year, renting studio time from Caroline Records intern Anton Schlesinger. They developed a friendship and work relationship, eventually co-owning Backwoodz Studioz. As of 2023, Woods still runs A&R and executive produces for some of the artists on the label, but has been replaced as president by Schlesinger after the label has ballooned in size. A profile on Backwoodz Studioz published in Pitchfork pinpoints the release of History Will Absolve Me and the subsequent cult following garnered by that record as the turning point for the label. It was also around this time that they launched an online store, cutting out the previous middlemen needed for distribution, and signed Elucid, after he and Woods got introduced through fellow New York rapper Uncommon Nasa. In 2023 they signed a distribution deal with Fat Possum Records.

== Discography ==
=== Studio albums ===
==== Solo ====
- Camouflage (2003)
- The Chalice (2004)
- History Will Absolve Me (2012)
- Dour Candy (2013)
- Today, I Wrote Nothing (2015)
- Known Unknowns (2017)
- Terror Management (2019)
- Aethiopes (2022)
- Church (2022)
- Golliwog (2025)

==== With the Reavers ====
- Terror Firma (2005)

==== With Super Chron Flight Brothers ====
- Emergency Powers: The World Tour (2007)
- Indonesia (2009)
- Cape Verde (2010)

==== With Elucid as Armand Hammer ====
- Race Music (2013)
- Rome (2017)
- Paraffin (2018)
- Shrines (2020)
- Haram (2021) (with the Alchemist)
- We Buy Diabetic Test Strips (2023)
- Mercy (2025) (with the Alchemist)
- Snakes & Ladders (2026)

==== With Kenny Segal ====
- Hiding Places (2019)
- Maps (2023)

==== With Messiah Musik ====
- Church (2022)

==== With Moor Mother ====
- Brass (2020)

=== Compilation albums ===
- Cowardly Threats & Hideous Cruelty (2011)

=== Mixtapes ===
- New York Times (2006) (The Reavers)
- Deleted Scenes (2009) (Super Chron Flight Brothers)
- Half Measures (2013) (Armand Hammer)

=== Extended plays ===
- Furtive Movements (2014) (Armand Hammer)

=== Singles ===
- "Slums / America / Dusted" (2005) (The Reavers)
- "Shadows" (2006) (The Reavers)
- "Dirtweed" (2007) (Super Chron Flight Brothers)
- "Facetime" (2023) (with Kenny Segal, featuring Samuel T. Herring)
- "Misery" (2025) (featuring Kenny Segal)
- "BLK ZMBY" (2025)
- "Lead Paint Test" (2025) (featuring Elucid and Cavalier)

=== Guest appearances ===
- Invizzibl Men - "52 Lashings" from The Unveiling (2008)
- Vordul Mega - "Opium Scripts"; "Air Battery"; "Keep Livin'" + "Imani" from Megagraphitti (2008)
- Teleseen - "Chikurubi"; "Whiteworst" from Fear of the Forest (2009)
- A.M. Breakups - "Forms" + "Chapter 2" from The Cant Resurrection (2011)
- Cult Favorite - "Omega3" from For Madmen Only (2013)
- Uncommon Nasa - "The Stakes" from New York Telephone (2014)
- L'Orange - "The End" from The Orchid Days (2014)
- L'Orange - "Stop Growing" from After the Flowers (2015)
- Pawcut - "Vulture's Picnic" from Maverick (2015)
- Elucid - "Who No Know Gon Know" + "Slumped" from Osage (2016)
- Elucid - "Bleachwater" + "Lest They Forget" from Save Yourself (2016)
- Lushlife - "The Heart Is an Atomic Bomb" from My Idols Are Dead + My Enemies Are in Power (2017)
- Uncommon Nasa - "Written at Night" from Written at Night (2017)
- Mach-Hommy - "383 Myrtle" from Dumpmeister (2017)
- LNYCHPIN - "Move on" (feat. Lt Headtrip) (prod. Uncommon Nasa) from "LNYCHPIN" (2017)
- Henry Canyons - "It Don't Mean a Thing" from Cool Side of the Pillow (2018)
- Curly Castro - "Ital-You-Can-Eat" from Tosh (2018)
- MarQ Spekt - "Pagan Politics" from At War with the Slippery Shadows (2018)
- Blockhead - "Slippery Slope" from Free Sweatpants (2019)
- Teether & Stoneset - "Overthought" from Don't Come Back Here (2019)
- L'Orange & Jeremiah Jae - "Clay Pigeons" from Complicate Your Life with Violence (2019)
- Nicholas Craven - "Gyre" from Craven N 2 (2019)
- Shrapknel - "Estranged Fruit" from Shrapknel (2020)
- Quelle Chris & Chris Keys - "Grease from the Elbows" from Innocent Country 2 (2020)
- Preservation - "Lemon Rinds" + "Snow Globe" from Eastern Medicine, Western Illness (2020)
- FIELDED - "Justus" from Demisexual Lovelace (2020)
- Infinite Disease - "Anomalady" from DISEASTRA (2020)
- P.S. 4080 - "Cracks" from Paradigm Shift (2020)
- Small Bills - "Sometimes Care Looks Like Leave Me the Fuck Alone" from Don't Play it Straight (2020)
- Your Old Droog - "Odessa" from Dump YOD: Krutoy Edition (2020)
- Navy Blue - "Poderoso" from Songs of Sage: Post Panic! (2020)
- YOUNGMAN & Celestaphone - "Human Rights" from A Year of Octobers (2021)
- Pink Siifu - "Numbers on Yo Head" from Negro Deluxe (2021)
- Curly Castro - "Killmonger Was Right" from Little Robert Hutton (2021)
- Steel Tipped Dove - "Kingston"; "Nft"; "Buddy Ryan" + "Simple Machines" from Call Me When You're Outside (2021)
- SPECTACULAR DIAGNOSTICS - "A Gesture of... Fearlessness?" from Ancient Methods (2021)
- John Forte - "Good Money" from Vessels, Angels & Ancestors (2021)
- Your Old Droog & Lil Ugly Mane - "Meteor Man" from Space Bar (2021)
- PremRock - "Bardo" from Load Bearing Crow's Feet (2022)
- Elucid - "Sardonyx"; "Nostrand"; "Mangosteen" + "Jumanji" from I Told Bessie (2022)
- Myles Bullen - "Ordinary Magic" from "Mourning Travels" (2022)
- Algiers - "Bite Back" (2022)
- Tom Caruana - "Saltfish" from Strange Planet (2022)
- Jeff Markey - "Floaters" from Sports and Leisure (2022)
- Moses Rockwell - "Postmodern Moped" from Until You Run Out of Cake (2022)
- Manco Wilder - "Woody Guthrie" from The Phantom of the Corner Store (2023)
- Skech185 & Jeff Markey - "Western Automatic Music, Pt. 2" from He Left Nothing for the Swim Back (2023)
- Fielded - "Windbreaker"; "Worlds Away" from Plus One (2023)
- The Alchemist - "RIP Tracy" from Flying High (2023)
- Richie Culver - "Swollen" from Scream If You Don't Exist (2023)
- Kofi Flexx - "Apothecary" from Flowers in the Dark (2023)
- Noname - "gospel?" from Sundial (2023)
- Aesop Rock - "Living Curfew" from Integrated Tech Solutions (2023)
- Blockhead - "AAU Tournaments" + "Now That's What I Call A Posse Cut Vol. 56." from The Aux (2023)
- Shabaka - "Time Pieces" (2024)
- Ol' Burger Beats - "Black Sabbath" from 74: Out of Time (2024)
- OKSE - "Omager" from OKSE (2024)
- Real Bad Man - "The Initiates Piece" from Temple Needs Water. Village Needs peace. (2024)
- Hemlock Ernst - "Inherit My Speech" from The Fall Collection (2024)
- Elucid - "Bad Pollen"; "Instant Transfer" from Revelator (2024)
- Panchiko - "Shandy in the Graveyard" from Ginkgo (2025)
- Doseone - "Wasteland Embrace" from All Portrait, No Chorus (2025)
- By Storm - "Best Interest" from My Ghosts Go Ghost (2026)
- Mandy, Indiana - "Sicko!" from Urgh (2026)

== Bibliography ==
- Woods, Billy; Musgrove, M. (2023). A is for Anarchist. New York: Rizzoli Universe. ISBN 978-0-7893-4145-7.
