= Kenny Segal =

American record producer and DJ

- Born: December 3, 1979 (age 46); Rockville, Maryland, U.S.
- Origin: Los Angeles, California, U.S.
- Genres: Hip-hop; drum and bass
- Occupations: Record producer; DJ
- Years active: 2000–present
- Labels: Project Blowed; Decon; Ruby Yacht; Backwoodz Studios; Dome of Doom Records
- Website: kennysegal.bandcamp.com

Kenny Segal (born December 3, 1979), also known as Syndakit, is an American record producer and DJ based in Los Angeles, California. In 2018, Mixmag described him as "one of the best hip-hop producers in the city." He has been a member of Team Supreme, the Kleenrz, and the Jefferson Park Boys.

== Early life ==
Kenny Segal was born and raised in Rockville, Maryland. He played cello in school orchestras. He attended University of Southern California on a computer engineering scholarship. Subsequently, he changed his major to audio recording.

== Career ==
Kenny Segal originally played drum and bass at the Konkrete Jungle party in the 1990s. At Konkrete Jungle, he met rappers from the Project Blowed collective. After being inspired by Los Angeles' underground rap scene, he eventually switched to hip-hop. He was one of the first musicians to perform at the Low End Theory party.

In 2008, Kenny Segal released Ken Can Cook. A concept album based around food and cooking, it included guest appearances from Abstract Rude, Aceyalone, Myka 9, and P.E.A.C.E., among others. In 2015, he produced the album So the Flies Don't Come for Milo setting off a string of critically acclaimed collaborative albums including Hiding Places and Maps with Billy Woods, Back at the House (2019) with Hemlock Ernst., Purple Moonlight Pages (2020) with R.A.P. Ferreira and The Jefferson Park Boys, and Ajai (2020) with Serengeti. In 2018, he released instrumental album Happy Little Trees. Bandcamp Daily included it on the "Best Beat Tapes of 2018" list.

== Discography ==
=== Studio albums ===
- 3080 Flux (2002) (with Phoenix Orion, as Phoenix Orion and Syndakit)
- Ken Can Cook (2008)
- The Kleenrz (2012) (with Self Jupiter, as The Kleenrz)
- Season 2 (2016) (with Self Jupiter, as The Kleenrz)
- Happy Little Trees (2018)
- Hiding Places (2019) (with Billy Woods)
- Back at the House (2019) (with Hemlock Ernst)
- Ajai (2020) (with Serengeti)
- Indoors (2021)
- Maps (2023) (with Billy Woods)
- How to Capture Playful (2023) (with Pink Navel)
- Genuine Dexterity (2024) (with K-the-I???)
- The Night Green Side of It (2025) (with R.A.P. Ferreira)
- Antinomian Pandemonium (2026) (with MC Paul Barman)
- Doomed! (2026) (with Open Mike Eagle)

=== Compilation albums ===
- Kenstrumentalz Vol. 1: Look What I Found Under Kenny's Couch (2013)
- Kenstrumentals Vol. 2: Summer Rarities (2016)
- Kenstrumentals Vol. 3: Travelog (2018)
- Kenstrumentals Vol. 4: a lot on my plate (2020)
- Kenstrumentals Vol. 5: Winter Tours (2025)

=== EPs ===
- It's All Math (2014)
- Casual Horns, Dog (2018) (with Aaron Carmack and Mike Parvizi, as The Jefferson Park Boys)

=== Singles ===
- "Big Business" (2015) (with Self Jupiter, as The Kleenrz)
- "Ajai Epilogue" (2020) (with Serengeti)
- "Facetime" (2023) (with Billy Woods featuring Samuel T. Herring)

=== Productions ===
- Haiku d'Etat – "Coup de Theatre" from Coup de Theatre (2004)
- P.E.A.C.E. – Megabyte (2004)
- Aceyalone – "Grand Imperial" from Grand Imperial (2006)
- The Blacklove Radiators – Memoirs of Planet Lovetron (2008)
- Freestyle Fellowship – "Ambassadors" and "Gimmee" from The Promise (2011)
- Busdriver – "Eat Rich" and "Go Hard or Go Homogenous" from Perfect Hair (2014)
- Open Mike Eagle – "Idaho" from Dark Comedy (2014)
- Busdriver – "Much" and "Worlds to Run" from Thumbs (2015)
- Milo – So the Flies Don't Come (2015)
- Armand Hammer – "Pergamum" from Rome (2017)
- Milo – "Magician (Suture)", "The Young Man Has a Point (Nurture)", "Paging Mr. Bill Nun", "Sorcerer", "Yet Another", "Embroidering Machine", and "Rapper" from Who Told You to Think??!!?!?!?! (2017)
- Open Mike Eagle – "No Selling (Uncle Butch Pretending It Don't Hurt)" from Brick Body Kids Still Daydream (2017)
- Armand Hammer – "Alternate Side Parking" and "ECOMOG" from Paraffin (2018)
- Busdriver – "I Been There" from Electricity Is on Our Side (2018)
- Milo – "Mythbuilding Exercise No.9", "Deposition Regarding the Green Horse for Rap", and "Thinking While Eating a Handful of Almonds" from Budding Ornithologists Are Weary of Tired Analogies (2018)
- The Grouch – "Procrastination" from Unlock the Box (2018)
- Self Jupiter – "Window Seat" from S*xy Beast (2019)
- Armand Hammer – "Dead Cars" from Shrines (2020)
- R.A.P. Ferreira – Purple Moonlight Pages (2020)
- Serengeti – KDxMPC (2020)
- Elucid – "Jumanji" from I Told Bessie (2022)
- R.A.P Ferreira – "mythsysizer instinct" from 5 to the Eye with Stars (2022)
- Armand Hammer – "Total Recall", and "Doves" from We Buy Diabetic Test Strips (2024)
- Benjamin Booker – Lower (2025)
- Armand Hammer – "Send For Me", "Nightswim", and "Dogville" from Snakes & Ladders (2026)
