= Haram (album) =

2021 studio album by Armand Hammer and the Alchemist

Studio album by Armand Hammer and the Alchemist
- Released: March 26, 2021
- Genres: Hip-hop; art rap
- Length: 39:54 (Standard); 43:08 (ALC Records release)
- Labels: Backwoodz Studioz; ALC
- Producers: The Alchemist; Earl Sweatshirt

Armand Hammer chronology
Shrines (2020)	Haram (2021)	We Buy Diabetic Test Strips (2023)

The Alchemist chronology
Alfredo (2020)	Haram (2021)	This Thing of Ours (2021)

Haram is a collaborative studio album by American hip-hop duo Armand Hammer and American hip-hop record producer the Alchemist. It was released on March 26, 2021, via Backwoodz Studioz.

== Critical reception ==
Professional ratings
Aggregate scores
Source	Rating
Metacritic	83/100
Review scores
Source	Rating
AllMusic	4/5 stars
Beats Per Minute	88%
Clash	7/10
Pitchfork	7.8/10
Slant Magazine	4/5 stars

Haram was met with widespread critical acclaim upon its release. At Metacritic, which assigns a normalized rating out of 100 to reviews from professional publications, the album received an average score of 83, based on six reviews.

Reviewing the album for AllMusic, Paul Simpson felt that "The result is a dizzying swirl of disembodied soul samples and hazy beats that frequently dissolve and return, as the emcees deliver complex, metaphor-heavy rhymes addressing subjects such as colonialism and white supremacist oppression." In the Review for Clash, Nathan Evans claimed that, "The best tracks on 'Haram' come together with crooked production that twitches with sharp samples and cuts, and AH’s billy woods and Elucid filling the space with pointed flows. The boys are stiff-nosed and mean-mugged, tightly rapping about dead bodies and vulgar sex to such a degree, it could classify as vore fantasy. To match, Alchemist crosses his signature style with crimson atmospheres that are as wet and eerie as a blood-soaked slaughterhouse." Concluding a review for Pitchfork, Matthew Ismael Ruiz from wrote that "Haram offers another perspective of New York City's hard heart, rooted in ruminations on power and how it’s wielded. These are the spiritual descendants of Def Jux, rappers that not only embrace the darkness, but wear it as a protective cloak."

The album art, which depicts two bloody decapitated pigs, drew criticism from animal rights group PETA, which called it "terrifying" and "cruel", and told the Alchemist to change it and "focus on the music, not the shock value of dead animals", after he posted it on Twitter.

=== Accolades ===
Haram on year-end lists
Publication	List	Rank	Ref.
Paste	The 50 Best Albums of 2021	16	
Pitchfork	The 50 Best Albums of 2021	26	

== Track listing ==
All tracks are produced by the Alchemist, except for track 6 co-produced by Earl Sweatshirt.

Haram track listing
No.	Title	Writer(s)	Length
1.	"Sir Benni Miles"	Elucid; Billy Woods; Daniel Alan Maman	2:59
2.	"Roaches Don't Fly"	Elucid; Woods; Maman	1:28
3.	"Black Sunlight" (featuring Kayana)	Elucid; Woods; Maman	2:43
4.	"Indian Summer"	Elucid; Woods; Maman	2:40
5.	"Aubergine" (featuring Fielded)	Elucid; Woods; Maman	3:17
6.	"God's Feet"	Elucid; Woods; Maman	2:17
7.	"Peppertree"	Elucid; Woods; Maman	2:00
8.	"Scaffolds"	Elucid; Woods; Maman	2:55
9.	"Falling Out the Sky" (featuring Earl Sweatshirt)	Elucid; Woods; Maman; Thebe Kgositsile	3:40
10.	"Wishing Bad" (featuring Curly Castro and Amani)	Elucid; Woods; Maman; Kinte McDaniel; Amani	3:45
11.	"Chicharrones" (featuring Quelle Chris)	Elucid; Woods; Maman; Gavin Tennille	3:28
12.	"Squeegee"	Elucid; Woods; Maman	2:53
13.	"Robert Moses"	Elucid; Woods; Maman	1:35
14.	"Stonefruit"	Elucid; Woods; Maman	4:17
Total length:			39:54

ALC Records release
No.	Title	Writer(s)	Length
15.	"Moneylenders"	Elucid; Woods; Maman	3:14
Total length:			43:08
