= Armand Hammer (group) =

American hip hop duo

- Origin: New York City, New York, US
- Genres: East Coast hip hop; abstract hip hop; experimental hip hop
- Years active: 2013–present
- Labels: Backwoodz Studioz; PTP; Fat Possum
- Members: Billy Woods; Elucid
- Website: armandhammer.bandcamp.com

Armand Hammer is an American hip hop duo from New York City consisting of Billy Woods and Elucid. Since forming around 2013 the two have released a mixtape, an EP, two compilations and seven studio albums, among them Paraffin (2018), Shrines (2020), We Buy Diabetic Test Strips (2023) as well as two collaborative albums with record producer the Alchemist, Haram (2021) and Mercy (2025), all of which have garnered them a cult following as well as critical success.

Armand Hammer has released all their projects through Woods' label Backwoodz Studioz which he founded in 2002 and has run ever since together with Anton Schlesinger. Their music oftentimes revolves around political and psychosocial themes.

== Background ==
Woods and Elucid met after being introduced to each other by New York rapper Uncommon Nasa. "It was some kinship from the start" said Elucid about that moment in an interview over ten years later. Early collaborations of the two included two feature verses by Elucid on Woods' History Will Absolve Me (2012). At first Woods was apprehensive about forming a collaborative project due to past negative experiences, but eventually he suggested they give it a try.

The group is named after American industrialist, oil tycoon and art collector Armand Hammer.

== Career ==
In September 2013, Armand Hammer released their debut mixtape, Half Measures. The mixtape was produced by Backwoodz engineer Steel Tipped Dove, as well as Blockhead, Uncommon Nasa, and Small Pro, among others. On October 22 2013, the duo released their first studio album, Race Music, which was produced by Steel Tipped Dove, Marmaduke, Willie Green, and Blue Sky Black Death. Stephen Weil of Tiny Mix Tapes called it "a potent record about life, art, sex, drugs, politics, and violence."

In 2014, the duo released their debut EP Furtive Movements. Produced mostly by Messiah Musik and Elucid and entirely recorded at the latter's home, Furtive Movements was initially planned as a remix album of Race Music, but that concept was thrown out in favor of an independent and fully realized follow-up. The Village Voice included both Race Music and Furtive Movements on their yearly "10 Best New York City Rap Albums" lists.

In 2017, the duo released their second studio album, Rome, followed by Paraffin in 2018. Paraffin featured on multiple end of the year lists.

In June 2020, the duo released their fourth studio album, Shrines. The record featured guest appearances from Pink Siifu, Keiyaa, Earl Sweatshirt, R.A.P. Ferreira, Fielded, AKAI SOLO, Curly Castro and Moor Mother. "We got all of those people involved because we saw the light in all of those cats," Elucid said of the younger featured acts. The song "Charms" was highlighted in a GQ interview the following year for being a happier, "brighter sounding moment", something they would continue into their next album with multiple songs on Haram even being called "summer songs".

The duo's first collaborative studio album with record producer the Alchemist, Haram, was released in 2021. The record saw many of the collaborators from Shrines return.

In 2023, the duo released their sixth studio album, We Buy Diabetic Test Strips, featuring production from JPEGMAFIA, El-P, Kenny Segal, Messiah Musik, Child Actor, PUDGE, and DJ Haram.

The group released Mercy, their second collaborative album with The Alchemist, on November 7, 2025. The album has been reviewed favorably by critics.

In 2026, the duo released their eighth studio album, Snakes & Ladders. The album features credits from artists, producers, and bands including Kenny Segal, Human Error Club, Clipping, Preservation, Theravada, Child Actor, DJ Haram, Sebb Bash, Jeff Markey, Silkmoney, Saint Abdullah, Eomac, and Animoss.

== Discography ==
=== Studio albums ===
- 2013 – Race Music
- 2017 – Rome
- 2018 – Paraffin
- 2020 – Shrines
- 2021 – Haram (with The Alchemist)
- 2023 – We Buy Diabetic Test Strips
- 2025 – Mercy (with The Alchemist)
- 2026 – Snakes & Ladders

=== Mixtapes ===
- 2013 – Half Measures

=== EPs ===
- 2014 – Furtive Movements

=== Compilation albums ===
- 2022 – WHT LBL
- 2024 – BLK LBL

=== Guest appearances ===
Title	Year	Artist(s)	Album
"David Rodigan"	2014	Curly Castro	Brody
"Fake Surfers 2"	2015	Zilla Rocca & The Shadowboxers	Non-album single
"The Thousand Headed Man"	2016	Willie Green	Doc Savage
"Favors Are Bad News"	2018	Zilla Rocca	Future Former Rapper
"Be Safe"	2019	Blockhead	Free Sweatpants
"Free Kelly Rowland"	2020	Bartees Strange	Live Forever
"Shortcuts"	2021	Defcee & Messiah Muzik	Trapdoor
"Burner Account"	2021	Open Mike Eagle	Component System with the Auto Reverse
"Tabula Rasa"	2022	Earl Sweatshirt	Sick!
"Rossi"	2022	Defcee & Boathouse	For All Debts Public and Private
"Upper Room"	2022	Akai Solo	Spirit Roaming
"Tokyo Blunts"	2022	Pink Siifu & Real Bad Man	Real Bad Flights
"Tithes"	2023	Celestaphone	Paper Cut from the Obit
"Compass/SeaMurda"	2023	Ho99o9	Territory: Turf Talk, Vol. II
"Give Thanks"	2023	Blockhead	The Aux
"Family"	2023	Shapednoise	Absurd Matter
"Native Sun"	2023	Jeff Markey	Sports & Leisure
"Jomon - Preservation Rework"	2024	Hatis Noit	Non-album single
"Spellcasted Television"	2024	Kenny Segal & K-the-I???	Genuine Dexterity
"Blood Running High"	2024	Kronos Quartet	Outer Spaceways Incorporated: Kronos Quartet & Friends Meet Sun Ra
"1010WINS"	2025	Aesop Rock	Black Hole Superette
"Repeater"	2025	Shapednoise	Absurd Matter 2
"Stenography"	2025	DJ Haram	Beside Myself
"Mondo Cane"	2025	Preservation & Gabe 'Nandez	Sortilège
"Crtx/Vrtx"	2025	Pink Siifu	ONYX'!
"Errybody"	2026	Gangrene	Better Than McDonald's
"No Future Pt. 1 & 2"	2026	Meiv	Non-album single
"As We Are"	2026	Saint Abdullah, Eomac	When The Sandbox Has No Edge

== Tours ==
=== Headlining ===
- We Buy Diabetic Test Strips Fall/Winter Tour (2023)
- Mercy Tour (2026)
- North American Tour (2026)
