= Rome (Armand Hammer album) =

2017 hip-hop album by Armand Hammer

Studio album by Armand Hammer
- Released: November 3, 2017
- Genre: Hip-hop
- Length: 43:31
- Label: Backwoodz Studioz
- Producers: Messiah Musik; August Fanon; Fresh Kills; High Priest; Kenny Segal; JPEGMafia

Armand Hammer chronology
Race Music (2013)	Rome (2017)	Paraffin (2018)

Rome (sometimes stylized as ROME) is the second studio album by American hip-hop group Armand Hammer. It was released via Backwoodz Studioz in 2017.

== Critical reception ==
Professional ratings
Review scores
Source	Rating
Impose	favorable
Pitchfork	8.1/10
Vulture	favorable

Phillip Mlynar of Pitchfork gave the album an 8.1 out of 10, writing, "the two emcees have delved deeper and burrowed further into the leftfield, carving out a shadowy nook that not only shuns the commercial trappings of the mainstream but also moves on from the boom-bap theology that can plague these kinds of records." Anthony Fantano of The Needle Drop gave it a strong 6. Paul Thompson of Vulture gave the album a favorable review, saying, "Rome, their newest record, is also their best, a master class in style and form, and a pointed look at the grand and tiny grasps for power people make every day, from private property seizures to nationalist Facebook rants." He added, "It's a record that fully utilizes each artist's greatest strengths, and stands up to any rap album released in 2017." Charles Aaron of City Pages described the album as "a grimly volatile, frightfully insightful spew of epic-poem proportions."

Tom Breihan of Stereogum placed Rome at number 28 on the "40 Best Rap Albums of 2017" list. In 2025, Pitchfork placed it at number 73 on their list of the "100 Best Rap Albums of All Time".

== Track listing ==
No.	Title	Producer(s)	Length
1.	"Pakistani Brain"	Messiah Musik	2:18
2.	"Dead Money"	Messiah Musik	3:31
3.	"Tread Lightly"	August Fanon	3:10
4.	"Carnies" (featuring Mach-Hommy)	Messiah Musik	2:25
5.	"Dry Ice"	Fresh Kills	2:35
6.	"Microdose" (featuring Quelle Chris)	August Fanon	4:02
7.	"Fanon's Ghost"	August Fanon	2:42
8.	"Shammgod" (featuring Denmark Vessey)	High Priest	4:00
9.	"Stole"	Messiah Musik	3:05
10.	"It Was Written"	August Fanon	2:27
11.	"Dianetics" (featuring Curly Castro)	Messiah Musik	3:39
12.	"Pergamum"	Kenny Segal	3:43
13.	"Barbarians"	JPEGMafia	4:15
14.	"Overseas (Epilogue)"	August Fanon	1:39
Total length:			43:31
