= Elucid =

American rapper

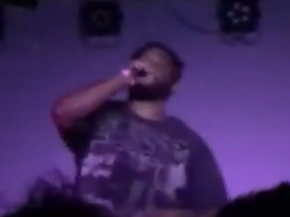
- Elucid performing in 2020

Background information
- Born: 1981 (age 44–45); Jamaica, Queens, New York City, U.S.
- Genre: East Coast hip-hop
- Occupations: Rapper; record producer
- Years active: 2002–present
- Labels: Backwoodz Studioz; Ruby Yacht; Salim Recordings; A Night on Canopy; Fat Possum
- Member of: Armand Hammer; Cult Favorite; Lessondary; Nostrum Grocers; Small Bills
- Website: elucid.bandcamp.com

Elucid (often stylized as E L U C I D), is an American rapper and record producer from New York City. He has been a member of Armand Hammer, Cult Favorite, Lessondary, Nostrum Grocers, and Small Bills.

== Early life ==
Elucid was born in Jamaica, Queens. His mother was a singer and his father was a bassist. He grew up in Deer Park, New York. Subsequently, he moved to East New York, Brooklyn.

== Career ==
Elucid released his debut solo studio album, Save Yourself, in 2016. In 2017, he released a mixtape, Valley of Grace. In 2018, he released a collaborative studio album with Milo, titled Nostrum Grocers, under the group moniker Nostrum Grocers. In that year, he also released a mixtape, Shit Don't Rhyme No More. In 2019, he released a mixtape, Every Egg I Cracked Today Was Double Yolked. He released "Seership!" in 2020. In that year, he also released a collaborative studio album with The Lasso, titled Don't Play It Straight, under the group moniker Small Bills. In 2022, he released a solo studio album, I Told Bessie. In 2023, Arielle Lana LeJarde of Rolling Stone called "Mangosteen" (featuring billy woods) one of the 100 best East Coast hip-hop songs of all time. In 2024, he released two albums, Revelator and Interference Pattern, the second of which was released exclusively onto his Bandcamp page. The New York Times' chief pop music critic Jon Pareles named Revelator one of his ten best albums of 2024. In 2026, he released I Guess U Had to Be There, a collaborative album with Swiss producer Sebb Bash.

== Discography ==
=== Studio albums ===
- For Madmen Only (with A.M. Breakups, as Cult Favorite; 2013)
- Save Yourself (2016)
- Nostrum Grocers (with Milo, as Nostrum Grocers; 2018)
- Don't Play It Straight (with The Lasso, as Small Bills; 2020)
- I Told Bessie (2022)
- Revelator (2024)
- Interference Pattern (2024)
- I Guess U Had to Be There (with Sebb Bash; 2026)

=== Mixtapes ===
- The Bible & The Gun (2002)
- Smash & Grab (2007)
- Police & Thieves (2008)
- The Sub Bass Diet (2009)
- Super Chocolate Black Simian (2011)
- Super Chocolate Black Simian II (2011)
- Bird Eat Snake // The Love Offering (2012)
- Valley of Grace (2017)
- Horse Latitude (2017)
- No Edge Ups in Uganda (with Haj of Dumhi; 2018)
- Shit Don't Rhyme No More (2018)
- Every Egg I Cracked Today Was Double Yolked (2019)

=== Extended plays ===
- Bear Trapz (2009)
- Osage (2016)

=== Singles ===
- "Bernadette" (2017)
- "Seership!" (2020)
