= Service Merchandise (album) =

Studio album by Previous Industries
- Released: June 28, 2024
- Length: 35:10
- Label: Merge
- Producers: Child Actor; Quelle Chris; Smoke Bonito

Previous Industries chronology
Service Merchandise (2024)	Evergreen Plaza (2025)

Open Mike Eagle chronology
Another Triumph of Ghetto Engineering (2023)	Service Merchandise (2024)	Neighborhood Gods Unlimited (2025)

Video Dave chronology
ArticulatedTexTiles (2023)	Service Merchandise (2024)	Old Chicago Stadium (2025)

Singles from Service Merchandise
- 1. "Showbiz"/"Braids" Released: January 24, 2024; 2. "Pliers" Released: April 23, 2024; 3. "Zayre" Released: May 29, 2024

Service Merchandise is the debut studio album by Los Angeles hip-hop trio Previous Industries, a group consisting of rappers Open Mike Eagle, Still Rift, and Video Dave. The album was released on June 28, 2024, by Merge Records. It was preceded by three singles.

The group originated during hangouts at Eagle's apartment during the COVID-19 pandemic in 2020, with group writing sessions leading to the creation of the album's songs. The project revolves thematically around the subject of defunct American retail chains, with the album and all its songs named after various such stores.

Most of the album was produced by Child Actor, aside from two songs produced by Quelle Chris and one by Smoke Bonito. The album features two guest verses: Queen Herawin on "Montgomery Ward", and Quelle Chris on "Dominick's".

== Background ==
Eagle and Still Rift met as sophomores at Whitney Young High School in Chicago, and Eagle met Video Dave when both were students at Southern Illinois University Carbondale. After college, Still Rift stayed in Chicago while Eagle moved to Los Angeles and Dave moved to New York City. Dave later moved to Los Angeles to act as a consultant on Eagle's Comedy Central series The New Negroes with Baron Vaughn and Open Mike Eagle, which was canceled after its first season. Eagle addressed this cancellation, as well as his divorce and the dissolution of his other hip-hop group Hellfyre Club, on the Anime, Trauma and Divorce song "Everything Ends Last Year", and noted that Previous Industries's beginnings coincided with all that.

Their prior work together as a trio includes the songs "Multi-Game Arcade Cabinet" (also featuring R.A.P. Ferreira), "Circuit City", and "Kites" from Eagle's 2022 album Component System with the Auto Reverse, and "The Grand Prize Game on the Bozo Show" and "WFLD 32" from Eagle's 2023 album Another Triumph of Ghetto Engineering.

== Writing and recording ==
During the COVID-19 lockdowns, the three formed a social pod, hanging out at Eagle's apartment and playing Tekken 7 and Street Fighter V together. During that time, they started having group songwriting sessions that lasted for five months, with their work eventually turning into Service Merchandise.

During the writing process, the trio bonded over their memories of old technology and defunct American retail chains that became the namesakes of the album and its tracks, including Service Merchandise, Zayre, White Hen Pantry, Montgomery Ward, and Fotomat. This subject matter became the conceptual heart of the group, and, according to Dave, it was the first thing they came up with after Eagle showed the other two his collection of old magazines.

== Release ==
Previous Industries was first announced on January 24 with the release of the two-song single "Showbiz"/"Braids". "Showbiz" was produced by Child Actor, and "Braids" by Quelle Chris. Each member's verse on "Showbiz" begins with an interpolation of the song "The Humpty Dance". They also announced that the group had signed with Merge Records.

Service Merchandise was announced on April 23, with its release date set for June 28 by Merge. The second single, "Pliers", was released the same day, also produced by Child Actor. It came with a music video, directed by Video Dave and animated by Crankbunny, which is a shot-for-shot remake of "Show me the way to go home" scene from the film Jaws. Eagle called "Pliers" a "song about tension, pressure and using our tools. It's about the pressure of being middle-aged in rap, the pressure of sharing oneself in relationships and a high stack of yesterdays about to topple into tomorrow. It's the sound of the fight to take a deep breath." The group also announced US tour dates for July through October.

The third single, "Zayre", was released on May 29, and was also produced by Child Actor.

== Themes ==
The album's central concept is related to defunct American retail chain stores, expanding on the concept to covers themes including nostalgia, heartbreak, loss, middle age, memory, and the parallel histories of commercial hip-hop and brick and mortar businesses. Flood Magazine's Taylor Ruckle said the themes are conveyed through lyrical triple entendres, and that the cultural touchstones touched upon are "symbol[ic] of an aspirational middle class comfort that's since gone the way of mixtapes and mail order."

== Reception ==
Professional ratings
Review scores
Source	Rating
AllMusic	4/5 stars
The Line of Best Fit	7/10
Pitchfork	7.8/10

Flood Magazine's Ruckle wrote that the album "makes up for a lack of melodic hooks with verse after verse of peak rap performances full of insight, humor, and sophisticated wordplay."

== Track listing ==
All lyrics are written by Open Mike Eagle, Still Rift, and Video Dave; all music is composed by Eagle, Still Rift, Video Dave, and the track's respective producer. All tracks produced by Child Actor except where noted.

Service Merchandise track listing
No.	Title	Producer	Length
1.	"Showbiz"		3:00
2.	"Pliers"		3:02
3.	"Braids"	Quelle Chris	2:15
4.	"Roebuck"		3:15
5.	"Montgomery Ward" (featuring Queen Herawin)		3:31
6.	"White Hen"	Smoke Bonito	2:31
7.	"Babbages"		2:55
8.	"Fotomat"		3:54
9.	"Dominick's" (featuring Quelle Chris)	Quelle Chris	4:13
10.	"Zayre"		3:02
11.	"Kay Bee"		3:31
Total length:			35:10

== Personnel ==
Previous Industries

- Open Mike Eagle – vocals
- Still Rift – vocals
- Video Dave – vocals

Additional contributors

- Queen Herawin – vocals (5)
- Quelle Chris – vocals (9)
- Kenny Segal – mixing engineer
- Daddy Kev – mastering engineer
- Sam Operchuck and Freddie Sze – photography
