= Loden (musician) =

- Origin: Brussels, Belgium
- Genres: Electronic, instrumental hip-hop
- Occupation: Producer
- Years active: 2003–present
- Labels: Eat This Records, Mush Records, Circle into Square
- Website: www.lodenmusic.com

Loden is an electronic music producer based in Brussels, Belgium.

== Career ==
Valeen Hope, Loden's first album originally released on Eat This Records, was re-released on Mush Records in 2007. Loden released the second album, Buggy, on Mush Records in 2010. He released the third album, Burning Man Stage Hand, on Circle into Square in 2011. His 2013 fourth album, The Star-Eyed Condition, featured guest appearances from Open Mike Eagle, Ceschi, and Doseone, among others.

Loden produced Busdriver's 2012 album, Beaus$Eros, in its entirety. He has also produced tracks for Thirsty Fish and Sole.

== Discography ==
=== Albums ===
- Valeen Hope (Eat This Records, 2005)
- Buggy (Mush Records, 2010)
- Burning Man Stage Hand (Circle into Square, 2011)
- The Star-Eyed Condition (Circle into Square, 2013)
- Tsar (Self-released, 2017)
- Lit For Exits (Extinct) (Self-released, 2018)

=== EPs ===
- Nachtvorst EP (Colony Productions, 2005)
- All That's Left Is Right (Eat This Records, 2005)

=== Singles ===
- "A Better Landing" (Eat This Records, 2003)
- "Self-Aware Wolf" b/w "Radio" (Mush Records, 2010)

=== Productions ===
- Thirsty Fish - "Sounds Like Rap" and "Girls... Or... Like..." from Watergate (2011)
- Open Mike Eagle - "No Body Nose" from Rappers Will Die of Natural Causes (2011)
- Busdriver - "Ass to Mouth" "Colour Wheel" from ATM (2011)
- Busdriver - "Leaf House" (2011)
- Busdriver - Beaus$Eros (2012)
- Busdriver - "Superhands' Mantra" (2012)
- Sole - "People Piss Me Off" from No Wising Up No Settling Down (2013)
- Open Mike Eagle - "How To Be Super Petty To Your Ex" (2016)
