= Daedelus (musician) =

American record producer (born 1977)

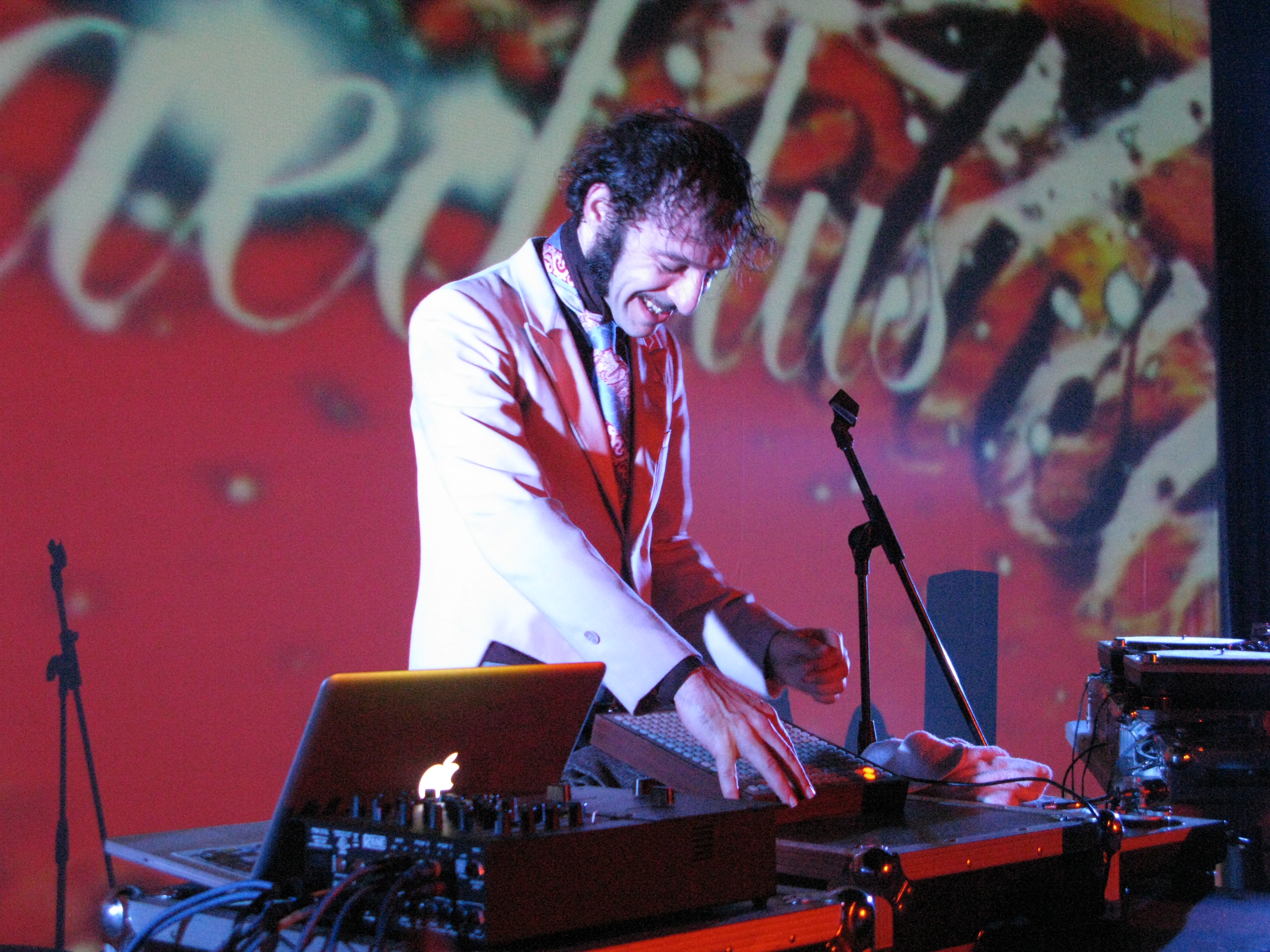
- Daedelus performing live in 2011

Background information
- Also known as: Alfred Darlington
- Born: Alfred Weisberg-Roberts; October 31, 1977 (age 48); Santa Monica, California, U.S.
- Origin: Los Angeles, California, U.S.
- Genres: Hip-hop; electronic
- Occupation: Producer
- Instruments: Monome; laptop computer
- Years active: 2001–present
- Labels: Plug Research; Mush; Laboratory Instinct; Ninja Tune; Brainfeeder; Alpha Pup; Eastern Developments; Anticon; Dome of Doom

Alfred Darlington (born Alfred Weisberg-Roberts; October 31, 1977), better known by their stage name Daedelus, is an American record producer based in Los Angeles, California. They (Note: Daedelus uses they/them pronouns.) are a member of the groups The Long Lost and Adventure Time. Daedelus is also affiliated with the internet radio station Dublab.

== Early life ==
Daedelus attended the University of Southern California Thornton School of Music studying jazz on double bass.

== Career ==
A teenage obsession with Greek mythology led them to adopt the stage name Daedelus—a tribute to the artist, inventor, and craftsman Daedalus.

In 1999 they began DJing Dublab.com's Entropy Sessions and releasing their own early demo productions. This got the attention of Carlos Niño (of Ammoncontact), who featured Daedelus tracks on two compilations. Subsequently, Daedelus released a studio album, Invention, on Plug Research in 2002. The Household EP was released on Eastern Developments in 2003. They also released The Weather, a collaborative album with Busdriver and Radioinactive, on Mush Records that year.

Daedelus released a studio album, Of Snowdonia, on Plug Research in 2004. It was followed by another solo album, A Gent Agent, on Laboratory Instinct that year.

Their 2005 album, Exquisite Corpse, featured guest appearances from MF Doom, Mike Ladd, and TTC. In the following year, they released Denies the Day's Demise on Mush Records.

Their 2008 album, Love to Make Music To, and 2011 album, Bespoke, were both released on Ninja Tune. They released the Righteous Fists of Harmony EP in 2010, and The Light Brigade in 2014. In 2013, they released a studio album, Drown Out, on Anticon. In 2015, they participated in the musical transmedia Soundhunters broadcast on the Franco–German channel Arte. In 2016, they released Labyrinths.

In 2019, they became a faculty member of the Berklee Electronic Production and Design Department.

In 2020, they were named an Artist In Residence at the SETI Institute.

== Discography ==
=== Studio albums ===
- Her's Is > [sic] (2001)
- Invention (2002)
- Dreams of Water Themes (2003) (with Frosty, as Adventure Time)
- The Weather (2003) (with Busdriver and Radioinactive)
- Rethinking the Weather (2003)
- A Gent Agent (2004)
- Of Snowdonia (2004)
- Exquisite Corpse (2005)
- Denies the Day's Demise (2006)
- Live at Low End Theory (2008)
- Love to Make Music To (2008)
- Bespoke (2011)
- Drown Out (2013)
- The Light Brigade (2014)
- Of Beyond (2014) (with Frosty, as Adventure Time)
- Kneedelus (2015) (with Kneebody)
- Labyrinths (2016)
- Baker's Dozen (2017)
- Wears House (2017)
- Taut (2018)
- The Bittereinders (2019)
- What Wands Won't Break (2020)
- What Wands Remixes (2020)
- Holy Water Over Sons (2021) (with Joshua Idehen)
- Simmers Over (2022)
- Xenopocene (2023)
- Em Dash (2025)

=== EPs ===
- Portrait of the Artist (2001)
- The Quiet Party (with Madlib as Yesterdays New Quintet) (2002)
- The Household EP (2003)
- Something Bells (2004)
- Meanwhile... (2004)
- Glass Bottom Boats (2004) (with Frosty, as Adventure Time)
- Axe Murderation Remixes (with Venetian Snares) (2006)
- Throw a Fit (2006)
- Fair Weather Friends (2007)
- Make It So (with Michael Johnson) (2008)
- Touchtone & FWF Remixes (2008)
- Friends of Friends Vol. 1 (with Jogger) (2009)
- Los Angeles 6/10 (with Teebs) (2010)
- Righteous Fists of Harmony (with Kid A) (2010)
- Overwhelmed EP (with Bilal) (2011)
- Looking Ocean (with Austin Peralta, Computer Jay, Zackey Force Funk) (2012)
- Pluses (2019)
- Visible (with Danae Greenfield) (2024)
- Way Out! (with Michael Dunaway) (2024)
- Daedalus (with Norfik) (2024)
- Tumult (with joni071012, Niels Broos) (2024)

=== Singles ===
- "Dublab presents: Freeways 7inch" (2001) (with Mia Doi Todd)
- "Hi-Top Fade Parade" b/w "My Petite" (2003) (with Frosty, as Adventure Time)
- "28:06:42:12" (2004) (with Boom Bip)
- "Impending Doom" b/w "Just Briefly" (2005)
- "Sundown" (2006)
- "For Withered Friends" (2008)
- "Make It So" (2008)
- "Hrs:Mins:Secs" (2008)
- "Sounds of Symmetry" (2011) (with James Pants)
- "Tailor-Made" (2011)
- "Ain't No Juke" (2013)
- "No One Answer" (for Andrew Huang 4 Producers series) (2022)
- "Knocking On Adore" (2022) (with Baseck remix)

=== Guest appearances ===
- Daedelus – "A Mashnote" from Dublab presents: Freeways (2001)
- Daedelus – "Let's Be Brave" from Advanced Public Listening 01 (2004)
- Daedelus – "Exp." from Tigerbeat Inc disc 1 (2005)
- Daedelus – "All Lights On Stage That Night" from Keepintime (2005)
- Mochipet – "Spring" from Bunnies & Muffins (2009)
- Daedelus – "Dnt Fk Sgr" from Echo Expansion (2009)
- Daedelus – "Untitled and Untitled (Extra Remix)" from Secondhand Sureshots (2009)
- The Gaslamp Killer – "Impulse" from Breakthrough (2010)
- Daedelus – "Off Angles Edges" from Proximity One: Narrative of a City (2010)
- Daedelus – "RandD" from Cambio (2012)
- Daedelus – "Ain't No Juke" from V/A Mad13 (2013)
- Daedelus – "The Beat Laid Bare" from Flywrench OST (2015)
- Daedelus – "Morning Melody" from Up Too Early (2017)
- Threefifty – "More" from Gently Among the Coals (2017)
- Wylie Cable – "Pirouette" from Buried At Sea (2018)
- Daedelus – "Order of the Golden Dawn" from Brainfeeder X (2018)
- Daedelus – "Night" from The Beat Will Always Save Us Vol. 2 (2019)
- Daedelus – "Brightest Star Tonight" from Road Angel Project, Vol.5 (2021)
- Daedelus – "Blast" from Dome of Doom Spring (2023)
- Daedelus – "Making The Beat Scene" from Staying: Leaving Records Aid to Artists Impacted by the Los Angeles Wildfires (2025)

=== Productions ===
- Prefuse 73 – "Busy Signal" from One Word Extinguisher (2003)
- Ammoncontact – "Super Eagles & Black Stars", "Hu Vibes RE:Invention" from Sounds Like Everything (2003)
- Madvillain – "Accordion" from Madvillainy (2004)
- Ammoncontact – "Dreamy" from One In An Infinity of Ways (2004)
- Busdriver – "Yawning Zeitgeist Intro", "Wormholes", "Befriend the Friendless Friendster", and "Lefty's Lament" from Fear of a Black Tangent (2005)
- Dwight Trible & The Life Force Trio – "Waves Of Infinite Harmony"(with Madlib), "Life Force" from Love is the Answer (2005)
- Subtitle – "Shields Up" from Terrain to Roam (2006)
- Shafiq Husayn – "Le'Star" from Shafiq En' A Free Ka (2008)
- Busdriver – "Scoliosis Jones", "Do the Wop", "Happy Insider", and "Fishy Face" from Jhelli Beam (2009)
- Nocando – "Skankophelia" from Jimmy the Lock (2010)
- Busdriver – "Thick Enough" and "Flesh Glove" from Computer Cooties (2010)
- Thirsty Fish – "Ducks Fail" from Watergate (2011)
- Blu – "Hours" and "Annie Hall" (featuring Chop, Brooker T & Tiombe Lockhart) from York (2013)
- Bass Sekolah – "Of rocks and trees" from The Dusun Sessions (2015)
- Kevin Abstract – "Yellow" from American Boyfriend: A Suburban Love Story (2016)
- Threefifty – "More" from Gently Among the Coals (2017)
- Busdriver – "Exploding Slowly" from Electricity Is on Our Side (2018)
- Shrimpnose – "Fall Away (feat. K.Raydio, Bobby Raps, & Daedelus)" from ...And The World Weeps (2019)
- Cyne – "Elephant Rome" from Water For Mars (2019)
- Self Jupiter – "When Some Drama Pops Off" from Sexy Beast (2019)
- Shrimpnose – "Getting Through To You" from Before It's Too Late (2020)
- Lapsung – "Disappearing Platforms" from wORM (2020)
- Attacca Quartet – "Holding Breadth (feat. Daedelus)" from Real Life (2021)
- Ape School – "Positively Green (feat. Daedelus)" from Hog Heaven (2023)
- TiMMY ONYSiM – "Peace With My Demons" (2025)
- Shrimpnose – "Flood Tide" (2025)

=== Remixes ===
- Lab Waste – "Get the Signal (Daedelus Remix)" from Zwarte Achtecground (2003)
- Technophonic Chamber Orchestra – "Vitus (Daedelus Remix)" from Nemoretum Sonata (2004)
- Take – "The Start of Our Ending (Daedelus Remix)" from Colossal (2004)
- Ilkae – "Daedelus" from bovine rearrangement (2004)
- The One A.M. Radio – "Under Thunder and Gale (A Black and Blue Sky by Daedelus)" from On the Shore of the Wide World (2005)
- Raw Thrills (Insted) – "Please Help Me Help You (Daedelus Remix)" from Together Again (2005)
- Soylent Green – "Altered State (Remix by Daedelus)" from Software and Hardware (2005)
- Build an Ark – "The Stars Are Singing Too (Daedelus Remix)" from Remixes, Vol. 1 - EP (2005)
- Flying Lotus – "1983 (Daedelus Remix)" from 1983 (2006)
- Busdriver – "Kill Your Employer (Daedelus Remix)" from Kill Your Employer (2006)
- Coldcut – "Man in a Garage (Daedelus Hydraulic Remix)" from Man in a Garage EP (2006)
- Department of Eagles – "Sailing by Night (Daedelus Floats Thru)" from Romo-Goth (2006)
- Savath & Savalas – "Paths in Soft Focus (Daedelus Wishes You The Best Remix)" from History Is Bunk, Pt.1 (2006)
- Cities – "Lounge Act (Daedelus Remix)" from Variations (2006)
- Junk Science – "Do It Easy (Daedelus Remix)" from Gran'dad's Nerve Tonic (2006)
- Eliot Lipp – "Glasspipe (Daedelus Journey To The Center Remix)" from Steel Street Scraps (2006)
- Tunng – "Bricks (Daedelus Remix)" from And Then We Saw Land (2007)
- Ernest Gonzales – "While On Saturn's Rings (Daedelus Remix)" from While On Saturns Rings (2007)
- Junk Science – "Do It easy (Daedelus mix)" from Grandad's Nerve Tonic (2007)
- Take – "You High (Daedelus Remix)" from Plus Ultra (2008)
- Kneebody – "Roll & Cupcake Baby - Daedelus Remix" from Daedelus Remixes (2008)
- Miki Furukawa – "Coffee & SingingGirl!!! - Relax for Daedelus Remix" from Candy Girl (2008)
- Lymbyc Systym – "So We Can Sleep (Daedelus Remix)" from Love Your Abuser Remixed (2008)
- zero dB – "Sunshine Lazy (Daedelus Remix)" (2008)
- Yo Gabba Gabba – "Happy (Adventure Time Remix)" from "Episode 106 - Happy" (2008)
- Little Boots – "Earthquakes (Daedelus RMX)" from Earthquakes Remixed (2009)
- John Tejada – "Imbroglio (Daedelus Reads the Definition)" from Reworked Data 95 Volume 1 (2009)
- Debruit – "Pouls (Daedelus Remix)" from Clé De Bras (2009)
- Miki Furukawa – "ジョナサン (Daedelus Remix)" from Bondage Heart Remixes (2009)
- STS9 – "The New Soma (Daedelus Remix)" from Peaceblaster (The New Orleans Make It Right Remixes) (2009)
- Quantic – "Undelievered Letter (Daedelus featuring Computer Jay Remix)" from Tradition in Transition (2010)
- Nosaj Thing – "Coat of Arms (Daedelus Remix)" from Drift Remixed (2010)
- Bilal – "Restart (Daedelus Remix)" from Restart (2010)
- Baths – "♥ (Daedelus' Snorelaxed Remix)" from Cerulean Remixed (2010)
- Emika – "Drop the Other (Daedelus Fragments into a Thousand Little Pieces)" from Ninja Tune XX Vol. 2 (2010)
- LDFD – "Outtacontrol (Daedelus Remix)" from Outtacontrol EP (2011)
- James Pants – "Thin Moon (Daedelus All I Need Remix)" from Sound of Symmetry, Vol. 1 (2011)
- Oorutaichi – "Futurelina (Daedelus Remix)" from Cosmic Coco, Singing for a Billion Imu's Hearty Pi (2011)
- Sepalcure – "Down (Daedelus RMX)" from Love Pressure Remixed (2011)
- Gustav – "Rettet Die Wale (Daedelus' Muddled Mix-Up)" from Pudel Produkte 15 (2011)
- Amon Tobin – "Kokuko Sosho Battle (Daedelus Remix)" from Chaos Theory Remixed (2011)
- Quantic and His Combo Barbaro – "Undelivered Letter (Daedelus Remix)" from Caliventura Remixes (2011)
- Slugabed – "Sex (Daedelus Remix)" from Sex (2012)
- Pure Filth Sound – "LAX to LDN (Daedelus Remix)" from LAX to LDN (2012)
- Turn On The Sunlight – "Firefly Night (Daedelus Remix)" from Remixes/Collaborations (2012)
- DJ Krush and Dj Kentaro – "Kikkake (Daedelus Remix)" (2012)
- Collarbones – "Don Juan (Daedelus' slowest decay)" (2012)
- Open Mike Eagle – "Nightmares (Daedelus Pacifically)" (2012)
- Zoon Van Snook – "Half Term(8:08) (Daedelus Remix)" from (Remixes from) The Nutty Tree (2012)
- Kid A – "BB Bleu (Daedelus Remix)" from BB Bleu (2013)
- Wax Tailor – "The Games You Play (Daedelus Remix)" from B-Sides & Remixes (2013)
- Sunny Levine – "No Other Plans (Daedelus Remix)" from Hush Now (2013)
- Daft Punk – "Doing It Right (Daedelus' Pacific RMX)" (2013)
- Hundred Waters – "Boreal (Daedelus Remix)" (2013)
- Sister Crayon – "Cynic (Daedelus Remix)" (2013)
- Mono/Poly – "Crew (Daedelus' Remix)" from Killer B's (2013)
- Kypski – "Wreck Fader Ft D-Styles (Daedelus' Remix)" from Wreck Fader (2013)
- Moors – "Gas (Daedelus Remix)" from Moors (2014)
- 80kidz – "Dusk (Daedelus Remix)" from Face:Remodel (2015)
- Chapelier Fou – "La Guerre des Nombres (Daedelus "War Of Numbers" remix)" from Fuse (2015)
- Jimmy Pé – "Broken Clock (Daedelus Remix)" from Fake Fantasy EP (2015)
- Bass Sekolah – "Lighthouse (Daedelus Remix)" from Lighthouse Remixed (2015)
- Saul Williams – "Horn of the Clock-Bike (Daedelus' Fugue)" from These Mthrfkrs (2016)
- Lemon Future – "Jovian Dream (Daedelus Remix)" from Golden Era (2016)
- The Album Leaf – "Back to the Start (Daedelus Remix)" from Between Waves (Deluxe Edition) (2016)
- DJ Shadow – "Mutual Slump (Daedelus Remix)" from Endtroducing... Re-Imagined (2016)
- Kasai Allstars – "Drowning Goat (Daedelus Remix)" from Félicité Remixes (2017)
- Jaw Gems – "Heatweaver (Daedelus Remix)" from Heatweaver Remixes (2017)
- Aeli – "Guasba Lik (Daedelus Remix)" from Late Future Calls (Remixed) (2017)
- Sonae – "Between Two Worlds (Daedelus Remix)" from Monika Werkstatt Remixes (2017)
- Jimmy Pé – "Robotic Trip (Daedelus Remix)" from WuShu (2017)
- Drum & Lace – "Sunrise (Daedelus Remix)" from Sunrise Remixes (2017)
- Inara George – "A Bridge (Daedelus Remix)" (2018)
- Death Cab For Cutie – "Gold Rush (Daedelus Remix)" (2018)
- Dropout Marsh – "Steam Vagabond (Daedelus Remix)" from Shore Shells (2018)
- Yo Gabba Gabba – "Quest (Daedelus Remix)" from Episode 411 – Quest (2018)
- Mild Minds – "Weak Signal (Daedelus' Missed Connections Remix)" from Swim Remixes (2019)
- MABUTA – "Fences (Daedelus Remix)" from Welcome To This World REMIXES (2019)
- んoon – "Custard (Daedelus Remix)" from Hoajao (2019)
- Local Natives – "Garden of Elysian (Daedelus Remix)" (2020)
- Brian Babylon – "Blacker Than A Thousand Midnights (Daedelus Remix)" (2022)
- QRTR – "Nossa (Daedelus Remix)" from infina ad nausea: the remixes (2022)
- Jaws That Bite – "Limba (Daedelus Remix)" (2022)
- AJ Lambert – "Madeleine (Daedelus' On Skin Remix)" (2022)
- Tropics – "Acrylic (Daedelus Remix)" from NTPM300 (2022)
- Tanya Tagaq – "Tongues (Daedelus Remix)" from North Star Remixes (2022)
- Kidkanevil – "Super FX (Daedelus Remix)" from BOBBLE (Bubble Expansion Pack) (2023)
- Sadnoise – "sifting instrumental (Daedelus' lightly Schranz Remix)" from New Musical Resources (Extended) (2023)
- Gouldian Finch – "Algorithm (Daedelus Megamix)" (2024)
- Shrimpnose – "Glued2 - Remix" (2024)
- Lord Genmu – "Dranzer (Daedelus Remix)" from Sigils REmixed (2024)
- Low Poly – "Phosphorus Scene (Daedelus Remix)" from Candlelight, codependent (2025)
- Zof – "WiFi (Daedelus Remix)" from Nostalgic Premonitions Remixed (2025)
- Disiniblud – "It's Change (Daedelus' the only constant remix)" from Disiniblud (Remixes) (2025)
- Inara George – "The Well (Daedelus Remix)" (featuring Israel Strom) (2026)
- Caural – "Krylon Psychology (Daedelus' Re-Cover)" from Aura (2026)

=== Mixes ===
- Where the Day Takes You (1998)
- Some Favorite Things - Disc Wave Records (2004)
- Happily Ever After (2010)
- Boiler Room #66 (2012)
- Lovers Juke Too (2012)
- Fact Mix 331 (2012)
- Exotica (2013)
- Lovers Juke Too, Deux (2016)
- Wears House (2017)
- Anima Invulnerable from Satellite Series • 1 (2017)
- Where the Day Takes 2 with side B by Goodnight Cody (2021)
- Live at 7th St December 28th 2024 (2024)

=== Video games ===
- Nidhogg (2014)
- Flywrench (2015)
- Nidhogg 2 (2017)

=== Book appearances ===
- Dublab: Future Roots Radio by Alejandro Cohen from Hat & Beard Press (2019)
- Bedroom Beats & B-Sides by Laurent Fintoni from Velocity Press (2020)
- PATCH & TWEAK with Moog by Kim Bjørn from Bjooks Publishing (2020)
- Madvillainy by Will Hagel from 33 1/3 Publishing (2023)
- Wales: 100 Records by Huw Stephens from Y Lolfa Publishing (2024)
