= Testing the Waters =

Studio album by Thirsty Fish
- Released: March 5, 2007
- Recorded: 2006
- Genre: Alternative hip-hop
- Length: 49:28
- Labels: Project Blowed; Bell Rang
- Producers: Open Mike Eagle, No Bliss, Maestroe, Elum, Kenny Segal, Soulspeak, Nick Sena, Mike Gao, Alkalyne, 60 Cycle Hum

Thirsty Fish chronology
Testing the Waters (2007)	Watergate (2011)

Testing the Waters is the debut album by American rap group Thirsty Fish, released March 5, 2007 on Bell Rang Records in affiliation with Project Blowed.

== Release ==
The water-themed album comes after Thirsty Fish member Dumbfoundead released a previous concept album in 2005, the video game themed Super Barrio Bros EP which features Psychosiz of Thirsty Fish on the track "Three Pipes Down" and Thirsty Fish's Open Mike Eagle on the track "Bosses" (alongside Alpha MC). All three members of the group appear on that album's bonus track "Shit Talkers".

== Reception ==
Generally regarded as a solid debut with average to above average ratings from consumers and above average to exceptional ratings from reviewers, Thirsty Fish have since been signed to Mush Records to produce a second album, Watergate. In spite of this, however, a recurring criticism is the group's overuse of the water theme.

== Track listing ==
No.	Title	Producer	Length
1.	"Fintro"	Open Mike Eagle	1:02
2.	"Third Shift"	No Bliss	2:04
3.	"The Thirst"	Maestroe	3:58
4.	"Hunting"	Maestroe	3:20
5.	"Oil Spill"	Elum	3:47
6.	"Fall Apart" (featuring Aceyalone)	Kenny Segal	4:35
7.	"High Tide"	Soulspeak	3:12
8.	"One Sip" (skit)	Open Mike Eagle	1:40
9.	"Fish Ain't Biting" (featuring Abstract Rude)	Nick Sena	3:34
10.	"River Styx"	Mike Gao	3:26
11.	"Pirahnas" (featuring Rogue-Venom, Lyraflip, and Sahtyre)	Maestroe	4:49
12.	"Fat Kid"	Alkalyne	3:01
13.	"Get Wet"	Maestroe	4:03
14.	"Troutro"	Open Mike Eagle	1:49
15.	"Snuggleberry Bushes" (bonus track)	60 Cycle Hum	5:08
