= Watergate (album) =

Studio album by Thirsty Fish
- Released: May 10, 2011
- Recorded: 2009–2010
- Genre: Underground hip-hop
- Length: 40:07
- Label: Mush Records
- Producers: Loden, Alpha MC, Exile, Tokimonsta, Para One, Awkward, Daedelus, Deader

Thirsty Fish chronology
Testing the Waters (2007)	Watergate (2011)

Professional ratings
Review scores
Source	Rating
Exclaim!	favorable

Watergate is the second album by American underground hip-hop group Thirsty Fish. It was released on Mush Records on May 10, 2011. It is a follow-up to the 2007 album Testing the Waters. The album is executive produced by Busdriver of Project Blowed.

== Artwork ==
The cover art was done by Los Angeles artist DosTres, the same artist used on the group's first album Testing the Waters, group member Dumbfoundead's solo debut Super Bario Bros EP, and group member Open Mike Eagle's Unapolegetic Art Rap.

== Track listing ==
No.	Title	Producer	Length
1.	"Sounds Like Rap"	Loden	3:33
2.	"Working The Numbers"	Alpha MC	3:30
3.	"Director's Cut" (featuring Lyraflip, Verbs, and Rogue-Venom)	Exile	3:57
4.	"Girls... Or... Like..."	Loden	3:54
5.	"Grind It Out" (featuring Busdriver)	Tokimonsta	4:54
6.	"Amateur Juggling" (featuring DJ Zo)	Para One	3:15
7.	"Antique Blowed Show"	Tokimonsta	3:30
8.	"Initiation"	Awkward	4:08
9.	"Ducks Fail"	Daedelus	4:13
10.	"The Like Song"	Deader	5:07
