= Exquisite Corpse (album) =

Studio album by Daedelus
- Released: March 22, 2005
- Genre: Electronic
- Length: 49:19
- Label: Mush Records, Ninja Tune
- Producer: Daedelus, Prefuse 73, Cyne, Jogger

Daedelus chronology
Of Snowdonia (2004)	Exquisite Corpse (2005)	Denies the Day's Demise (2006)

Singles from Exquisite Corpse
- 1. "Impending Doom / Just Briefly" Released: December 13, 2005

Professional ratings
Aggregate scores
Source	Rating
Metacritic	66/100
Review scores
Source	Rating
AllMusic	4/5 stars
Exclaim!	favorable
Pitchfork	7.1/10
PopMatters	5/10 stars
XLR8R	favorable

Exquisite Corpse is the eighth studio album by American electronic music producer Daedelus. It was released on Mush Records and Ninja Tune in 2005.

== Critical reception ==
At Metacritic, which assigns a weighted average score out of 100 to reviews from mainstream critics, the album received an average score of 66% based on 12 reviews, indicating "generally favorable reviews".

== Track listing ==
Mush Records edition
No.	Title	Producer(s)	Length
1.	"Dearly Departed"	Daedelus	4:08
2.	"Impending Doom" (featuring MF Doom)	Daedelus	2:19
3.	"Just Briefly"	Daedelus	3:16
4.	"Move On" (featuring Lil' Sci)	Daedelus	3:02
5.	"Now & Sleep" (featuring Laura Darling)	Daedelus	3:15
6.	"The Crippled Hand"	Daedelus	6:26
7.	"Welcome Home" (featuring Prefuse 73)	Daedelus, Prefuse 73	3:35
8.	"Cadavre Exquis" (featuring TTC)	Daedelus	3:25
9.	"Drops" (featuring Cyne)	Daedelus, Cyne	3:27
10.	"Fallen Love"	Daedelus	2:33
11.	"Welcome Home" (featuring Mike Ladd)	Daedelus	4:39
12.	"I. Sent Off / II. Sus Percoll" (featuring Jogger)	Daedelus, Jogger	4:46
13.	"The Trains Are Now So Clean"	Daedelus	1:08
14.	"Thanatopsis" (featuring Hrishikesh Hirway)	Daedelus	3:20

Ninja Tune edition
No.	Title	Producer(s)	Length
1.	"Dearly Departed"	Daedelus	4:09
2.	"Impending Doom" (featuring MF Doom)	Daedelus	2:19
3.	"Just Briefly"	Daedelus	3:16
4.	"Move On" (featuring Lil' Sci)	Daedelus	3:02
5.	"Now & Sleep" (featuring Laura Darling)	Daedelus	3:15
6.	"The Crippled Hand"	Daedelus	6:26
7.	"Welcome Home" (featuring Prefuse 73)	Daedelus, Prefuse 73	3:35
8.	"Drops" (featuring Cyne)	Daedelus, Cyne	3:26
9.	"Fallen Love"	Daedelus	2:33
10.	"Welcome Home" (featuring Mike Ladd)	Daedelus	4:39
11.	"I. Sent Off / II. Sus Percoll" (featuring Jogger)	Daedelus, Jogger	4:46
12.	"The Trains Are Now So Clean"	Daedelus	1:08
13.	"Thanatopsis" (featuring Hrishikesh Hirway)	Daedelus	5:20
14.	"Cadavre Exquis" (featuring TTC)	Daedelus	3:26
