= Denies the Day's Demise =

Studio album by Daedelus
- Released: May 9, 2006
- Genre: Electronic
- Length: 50:57
- Label: Mush Records, Ninja Tune
- Producer: Daedelus

Daedelus chronology
Exquisite Corpse (2005)	Denies the Day's Demise (2006)	Live at Low End Theory (2008)

Singles from Denies the Day's Demise
- 1. "Sundown" Released: October 3, 2006

Professional ratings
Aggregate scores
Source	Rating
Metacritic	80/100
Review scores
Source	Rating
AllMusic	4.5/5 stars
Exclaim!	favorable
MusicOMH	3/5 stars
PopMatters	8/10 stars
Stylus Magazine	B+
XLR8R	favorable

Denies the Day's Demise is the ninth studio album by American electronic music producer Daedelus. It was released on Mush Records and Ninja Tune in 2006.

== Critical reception ==
At Metacritic, which assigns a weighted average score out of 100 to reviews from mainstream critics, the album received an average score of 80% based on 12 reviews, indicating "generally favorable reviews".

Tim Sendra of AllMusic gave the album 4.5 stars out of 5, praising the record's "inventive samples drawn from unique and obscure sources" and "seriously good songcraft."

== Track listing ==
Mush Records edition
No.	Title	Length
1.	"At My Heels"	3:19
2.	"Sundown"	3:18
3.	"Bahia"	3:35
4.	"Lights Out"	3:12
5.	"Like Clockwork Springs"	2:46
6.	"Nouveau Nova"	3:36
7.	"Sawtooth EKG"	2:53
8.	"Samba Legrand"	5:48
9.	"Dreamt of Drowning"	2:43
10.	"Our Last Stand"	5:21
11.	"Patent Pending"	2:35
12.	"Never None the Wiser"	3:38
13.	"Petite Samba"	1:57
14.	"Sunrise"	2:56
15.	"Viva Vida"	3:18

Ninja Tune edition
No.	Title	Length
1.	"At My Heels"	3:19
2.	"Sundown"	3:18
3.	"Nouveau Nova"	3:36
4.	"Viva Vida"	3:18
5.	"Samba Legrand"	5:48
6.	"Like Clockwork Springs"	2:46
7.	"Lights Out"	3:12
8.	"Bahia"	3:35
9.	"Our Last Stand"	5:21
10.	"Patent Pending"	2:35
11.	"Sawtooth EKG"	2:53
12.	"Dreamt of Drowning"	2:43
13.	"Sunrise"	2:56
14.	"Petite Samba"	1:57
15.	"Never None the Wiser"	3:38
