= Nicht Sprechen =

EP by Dying Machines
- Released: September 25, 2012
- Genre: Ambient
- Length: 20:24
- Label: Mush

Dying Machines chronology
Nicht Sprechen (2012)	What I Have Not Forgotten (2013)

Nicht Sprechen (German: Do Not Speak) is the first studio EP from New Orleans, Louisiana musician Thomas Buschbach, under the name Dying Machines. Nicht Sprechen was released on Mush Records on September 25, 2012.

== Critical reception ==
The album was generally praised by critics. Jordan Richardson, writing for Blinded by Sound, stated:

A compelling release of tones and light, Dying Machines’ Nicht Sprechen is a beautifully contemplative and outstandingly patient piece of work. In this era of flash and dash, Buschbach has thankfully created moments worth savouring.

== Track listing ==
1. "This, and Other Times"
2. "Await You"
3. "Leaf"
4. "As a Day Fades"
5. "Some Mistakes Are Bigger Than Others"
