= Beltecno Corporation =

Japanese company

Beltecno Co. Ltd.
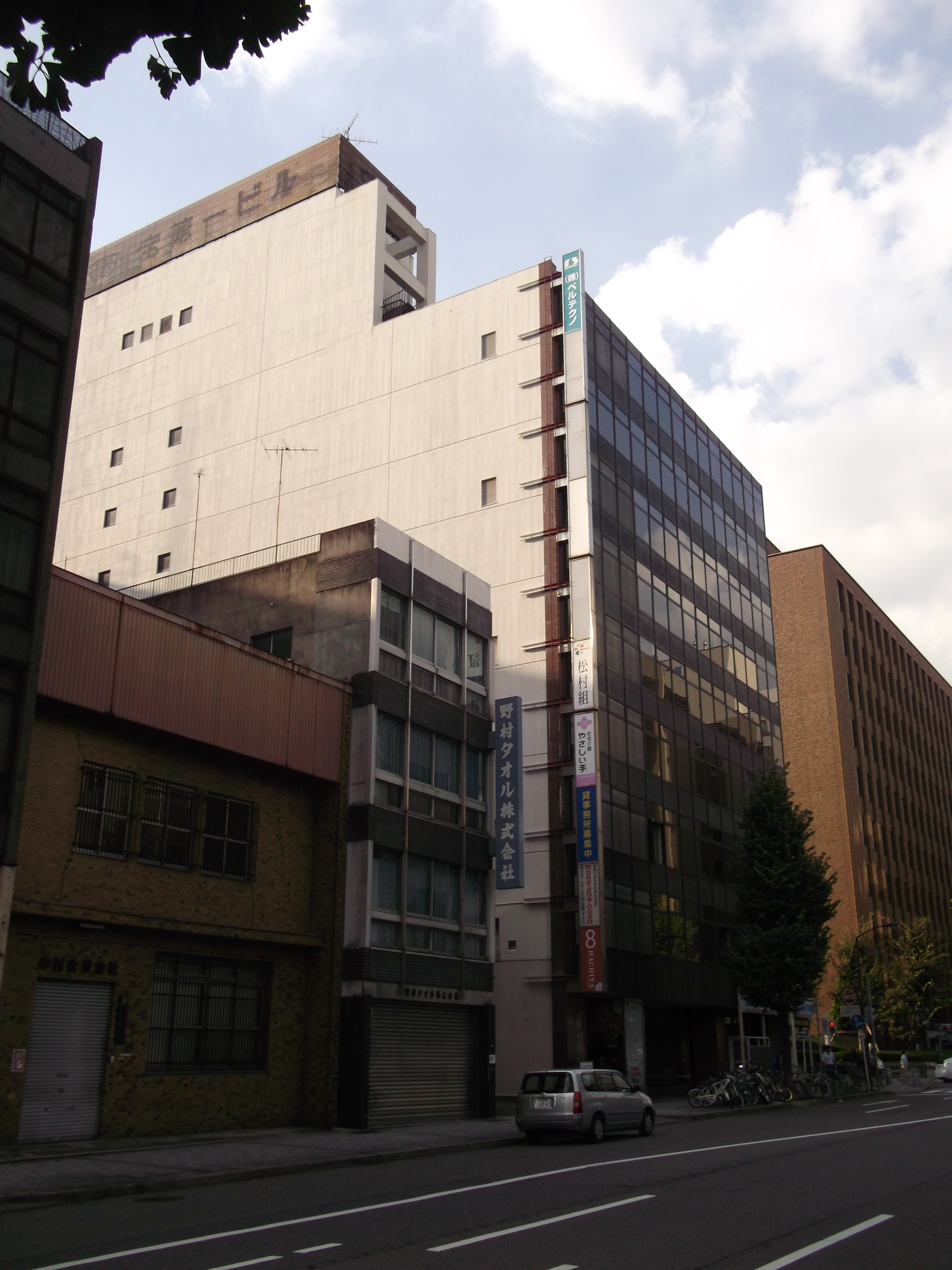
- Headquarters of Beltecno Corporation
- Founded: January 31, 1947; 79 years ago
- Headquarters: Nagoya, Japan
- Key people: Hiroshi Suzuki (president & director)
- Net income: ¥ 6,982 million (March 2012)
- Total assets: ¥ 7,068 million (March 2012)
- Number of employees: 138+
- Subsidiaries: Beltecno India Private Limited
- Website: www.beltecno.co.jp

Beltecno Corporation (株式会社ベルテクノ) is a Japanese company based in Naka-ku, Nagoya that manufactures stainless steel products. It also manufactures kitchen equipment, bathroom fixtures, housing facility equipment, construction equipment and dyeing machines. The company was founded in 1947.

The company is listed in the JASDAQ Securities Exchange.

== History and timeline ==
In 1947, Suzuki-Shoten was established for manufacturing dyeing machines. Ten years later in 1957 Suzuki Seisakusho Co. Ltd was established with the aim of manufacturing and selling dyeing machines.

Then in 1960 Tokai Sink Co. Ltd was set up for the purpose of manufacturing and selling housing equipment. And in 1966 Tokai Sink Sales Co. Ltd was incorporated for the purpose of selling housing equipment.

When Suzuki Seisakusho Co. Ltd. merged with Tokai Sinku Co. Ltd and Tokai Sink Sales Co. Ltd in 1990, it changed its company name to Beltecno Co. Ltd.

Nearly ten years later the Beltecno Headquarter, Nagoya branch and the Manufacturing Department were certified by the International Quality Management System ISO9001 in 1998/1999. The company also incorporated Beltecno Giken East Co., Ltd. for manufacturing Stainless-Steel Reservoir.

In 2004, the corporation was listed on the JASDAQ Securities Exchange. And in 2006, the IGC Corporation, a subsidiary of Wood One Co., Ltd., implemented TOB and acquired 96.2% of the shares. Become a consolidated subsidiary of Wood One. It was later de-listed from JASDAQ Securities Exchange in 2007. Before becoming a wholly owned subsidiary of IGC Co., Ltd. through share exchange on March 1 that same year.

On February 1, 2008, a domestic housing equipment business was incorporated into Bell Kitchen Co., Ltd. through the inauguration and Bell Kitchen International Inc. in the United States to Bell Kitchen Co., Ltd. On April 23, the IGC Corporation transferred the shares of the company and the company Bell Dyeing to BT Holding Co., Ltd. The Suzuki family now owns all shares. The capital relationship with Wood One disappeared. On July 1 they merged with Bell Dyeing Co., Ltd.

In 2009, the company incorporated Beltecno India Private Limited. Neemrana plant was constructed in Rajasthan.

In July 2011, a merger absorbed the separate dyeing machine business to 'Belle Dyeing'.
