= Doomed! (album) =

Studio album by Open Mike Eagle and Kenny Segal
- Released: August 14, 2026
- Genre: Hip-hop
- Length: 41:32
- Label: Backwoodz Studioz
- Producer: Kenny Segal

Open Mike Eagle chronology
| Neighborhood Gods Unlimited (2025) | Doomed! (2026) |

Kenny Segal chronology
| Antinomian Pandemonium (2026) | Doomed! (2026) |

Doomed! (stylized in all caps, alternatively fully titled DOOMED!: Rap Songs About a Relationship That Ends in Every Possible Universe) is the first collaborative studio album by American rapper Open Mike Eagle and record producer Kenny Segal. It was released on August 14, 2026, via Backwoodz Studioz. Entirely produced by Segal, it features guest appearances from Billy Woods, Gothic Tropic and Hemlock Ernst.

== Critical reception ==
Professional ratings
Aggregate scores
| Source | Rating |
|---|---|
| Any Decent Music | 7.8/10 |
| Metacritic | 83/100 |
Review scores
| Source | Rating |
| AllMusic | 4/5 stars |
| The Guardian | 3/5 stars |
| The Needle Drop | 8/10 |
| Paste | B |
| Pitchfork | 7.8/10 |
| Slant | 4.5/5 stars |

Doomed! was met with universal acclaim from music critics. At Metacritic, which assigns a normalized rating out of 100 to reviews from mainstream publications, the album received an average score of 83, based on nine reviews. On Any Decent Music, the album has a weighted average score of 7.8 out of 10 from eight critic scores.

Jon Negroni of Slant praised the album, saying: "even as songs like "Infinity War Spoilers" and "Science Fiction/Fantasy" reach toward the fantastical, the music remains restrained, allowing Eagle's bombastic thoughts to simmer. Segal fills the edges of the songs with dusty loops, muted jazz textures, and worn-down samples that make each track feel lived-in rather than merely produced". AllMusic's Paul Simpson stated: "for anyone who's had to deal with a hard breakup, DOOMED! is easily Open Mike Eagle's most relatable work". Dash Lewis of Pitchfork wrote: "Segal makes sure to keep the low frequencies hefty and the drums chunky, offering Eagle solid ground to stand on at a time when he's most at risk of floating away. That tether proves beneficial, allowing Eagle to pull himself back to the earth after his thoughts and anxieties send him careening into the cosmos". Grant Sharples of Paste resumed: "early on, DOOMED! makes a compelling case for both Eagle's sharp pen and whimsical improvisations".

In his mixed review for The Guardian, Will Pritchard summed up: "Segal's beats keep things interesting – a glistening cascade of keys on "She Swear I'm Colorblind", the slow-motion corrode of "Watching a Movie Called Freedom by Myself" – but Eagle's verses, still raw, never quite touch catharsis".

== Track listing ==
All tracks are produced by Kenny Segal.

Doomed! track listing
| No. | Title | Length |
|---|---|---|
| 1. | "Out to Lunch" | 3:26 |
| 2. | "Streets of Rage: Public Arguments Edition" (featuring Gothic Tropic) | 2:37 |
| 3. | "Doomed!" | 3:00 |
| 4. | "Unfinished Concrete Initials" (featuring Hemlock Ernst) | 3:10 |
| 5. | "Don't Go Look (Battleworld Focus Prayer)" | 1:46 |
| 6. | "She Swear I'm Colorblind" (featuring Billy Woods) | 3:29 |
| 7. | "Science Fiction/Fantasy" | 2:25 |
| 8. | "The Irredeemable Magic Man" | 2:23 |
| 9. | "The Many Hustles of My Lonely Time Traveling Uncle" | 2:07 |
| 10. | "Trying to Remember What I Aimed At" | 2:52 |
| 11. | "Schrödinger's Green Room (There But Uninvited)" | 2:28 |
| 12. | "It Happens in Every Universe (Interlude)" | 1:47 |
| 13. | "Sweetheart Jail" | 1:56 |
| 14. | "Infinity War Spoilers" | 2:12 |
| 15. | "Watching a Movie Called Freedom by Myself" | 5:54 |
| Total length: | | 41:32 |

Notes

- "Doomed!" is stylized in all caps.

== Personnel ==
- Michael W. Eagle II – lyrics, recording
- Kenny Segal – producer, recording, mixing
- Aaron Shaw – saxophone (tracks: 1, 6), flute (track 6)
- Jordan Katz – french horn & trombone (track 1)
- Ryan Crosby – guitar (track 2), bass (tracks 2, 3)
- Mekala Session – drums (tracks 2, 3)
- Diego Gaeta – Rhodes (tracks 6, 15)
- Mike Parvizi – guitar & bass (track 10)
- Kevin "Daddy Kev" Moo – mastering
- Shane Ingersoll – cover art
