= Another Triumph of Ghetto Engineering =

Studio album by Open Mike Eagle
- Released: August 25, 2023
- Studios: Eagle's home studio, Los Angeles
- Genre: Hip-hop
- Length: 25:28
- Label: Auto Reverse
- Producers: Quelle Chris; Illingsworth; Child Actor; Kenny Segal; Awkward

Open Mike Eagle chronology
| Component System with the Auto Reverse (2022) | Another Triumph of Ghetto Engineering (2023) | Service Merchandise (2024) |

Singles from Another Triumph of Ghetto Engineering
- 1. "WFLD 32" Released: August 4, 2023

Another Triumph of Ghetto Engineering is the ninth studio album by American rapper Open Mike Eagle, released on August 25, 2023, by Auto Reverse Records. Eagle executive produced the album, with the songs produced by Quelle Chris, Illingsworth, Child Actor, Kenny Segal, and Awkward. The album features guest verses from Eshu Tune, Still Rift, Video Dave, Young Zee, and Blu.

== Release ==
The album was announced on August 4, with a release date set for August 25 by Eagle's label Auto Reverse Records. The announcement came with the lead single, "WFLD 32", featuring Still Rift, Video Dave, and Hannibal Buress under his rap alias Eshu Tune. and produced by Kenny Segal. The song is named after the Chicago radio station of the same name. Eagle also revealed the track list and the cover art, a photograph Eagle took of his mother's hand, and put out a press release saying "In the ghetto we never stop toiling! These songs are all fancy ways of saying 'fuck you' to people that ignore us and 'thank you' to people that care if we live or die!"

The album's title first appeared on a print illustrated by McKay Felt, which was part of an exclusive vinyl release of Eagle's previous album, Component System with the Auto Reverse. Eagle recorded the album in his home studio which he calls Office Space Studios IV.

== Style and themes ==
The production on Another Triumph of Ghetto Engineering has been characterized as a "tuneful[ly] woozy" and "hypnotically lethargic" sound that makes extensive use of samples. Instrumentals on the album include a "hypnotic horn loop" on "WFLD 32", trip hop influences and "muffled electric guitar" on "I Bled on Stage at First Ave", and elements of tropicália on "We Should Have Made Otherground a Thing".

Critics describe the album as an introspective project on which Eagle reflects on his own career and those of his peers. HipHopDX's Will Schube identifies "the hard, often unrewarded work of Black artists everywhere" as the album's central theme, and characterizes the album as "a celebration of rap" and of rappers both past and present. The Fader's Nadine Smith calls Another Triumph of Ghetto Engineering "an ode to the resilience of the working musician", seeing Eagle "in an even more reflective mood than usual" as he discusses his experiences as a musician and the trajectory of his career. Yousef Srour of Pitchfork describes the album as "an ode to the music and memories that shaped Eagle's own character and career".

Much of the album sees Eagle tributing fellow hip-hop artists. "Dave Said These Are the Liner Notes" consists entirely of Eagle shouting out his mentors, mentees, and peers. Other songs include references to Quelle Chris, Wu-Tang Clan, OJ da Juiceman, Thundercat, Dumbfoundead, and Kenny Segal. Other subject matter includes fatherly advice to young people, musings on the inevitability of mortality, and references to Chicago's Robert Taylor Homes and their demolition (a topic previously explored on Eagle's 2017 album Brick Body Kids Still Daydream).

A line on "We Should Have Made Otherground a Thing" references the incident through which Eagle and Video Dave first met, where Dave's friends claimed the two looked alike.

== Reception ==
Another Triumph of Ghetto Engineering ratings
Review scores
| Source | Rating |
|---|---|
| HipHopDX | 4.4/5 |
| Pitchfork | 7.7/10 |

Schube said the album "proves why rap is quite simply the best thing on Earth." Bandcamp Daily's Phillip Mlynar included the album in a list of the best hip-hop albums of September 2023, calling the album "simultaneously booksmart and emotive" and saying it "ultimately relays a set of bittersweet memories while never losing grip of being curiously hopeful."

BrooklynVegan's Andrew Sacher wrote that "Just about anything that comes from the eccentric mind of Open Mike Eagle is worth listening to and this short-but-sweet project is no exception." Passion of the Weiss's Chris Daly called the album Eagle's "ninth master class" on which he "lays further claim to the most consistently solid rapper in the game today." Paste's Matt Mitchell called the album "just as good, if not better, than its predecessor, making good on Eagle's continued sense of profound penmanship."

=== Year-end lists ===
Another Triumph of Ghetto Engineering on year-end lists
| Publication | # | Ref. |
|---|---|---|
| BrooklynVegan (Rap Albums) | 22 | |
| Passion of the Weiss | 22 | |
| Paste (Hip-Hop Albums) | —N/a | |

== Track listing ==
Another Triumph of Ghetto Engineering track listing
| No. | Title | Producer | Length |
|---|---|---|---|
| 1. | "I Bled on Stage at First Ave" | Quelle Chris | 2:50 |
| 2. | "BET's Rap City" (featuring Young Zee) | Illingsworth | 2:45 |
| 3. | "A New Rap Festival Called Falling Loud" | Child Actor | 3:03 |
| 4. | "The Grand Prize Game on the Bozo Show" (featuring Video Dave and Still Rift) | Child Actor | 1:49 |
| 5. | "We Should Have Made Otherground a Thing" | Child Actor | 3:02 |
| 6. | "WFLD 32" (featuring Eshu Tune, Video Dave, and Still Rift) | Kenny Segal | 4:25 |
| 7. | "The Wire S3 E1" (featuring Blu) | Child Actor | 2:24 |
| 8. | "Dave Said These Are the Liner Notes" | Child Actor | 3:01 |
| 9. | "Mad Enough to Aim a Pyramid at You" | Awkward | 2:09 |
| Total length: | | | 25:28 |

== Personnel ==
- Open Mike Eagle – vocals, executive producer, cover photo
- Jake Bowman – mixing engineer
- Daddy Kev – mastering engineer
- Mike Parvizi – bass (4)
