= Anime, Trauma and Divorce =

Studio album by Open Mike Eagle
- Released: October 16, 2020
- Genre: Alternative hip-hop
- Length: 34:42
- Label: Auto Reverse Records
- Producers: Jacknife Lee (exec.); Open Mike Eagle (exec.); Black Milk; Caleb Stone; Frank Leone; Gold Panda; Loden; Nedarb

Open Mike Eagle chronology
Brick Body Kids Still Daydream (2017)	Anime, Trauma and Divorce (2020)	Component System with the Auto Reverse (2022)

Singles from Anime, Trauma and Divorce
- 1. "Bucciarati" Released: August 18, 2020; 2. "Death Parade" Released: October 13, 2020

Anime, Trauma and Divorce is the seventh solo studio album by American rapper Open Mike Eagle. It was released on October 16, 2020, through Auto Reverse Records. Production was handled by Caleb Stone, Frank Leone, Loden, Black Milk, Gold Panda and Nedarb, with Jacknife Lee and Open Mike Eagle serving as executive producers. It features guest appearances from Lil A$e, Kari Faux and Video Dave.

The accompanying music video for the album's lead single, "Bucciarati", was directed by Demi Adejuyigbe starring Paul F. Tompkins and Jordan Katz.

== Critical reception ==
Professional ratings
Aggregate scores
Source	Rating
AnyDecentMusic?	8.2/10
Metacritic	82/100
Review scores
Source	Rating
AllMusic	4/5 stars
And It Don't Stop	A−
Beats Per Minute	83%
Clash	9/10
DIY	4/5 stars
The Line of Best Fit	8/10
Loud and Quiet	8/10
Pitchfork	8/10

Anime Trauma + Divorce was met with widespread acclaim from critics. At Metacritic, which assigns a normalized rating out of 100 to reviews from mainstream publications, the album received an average score of 82 based on six reviews. The aggregator AnyDecentMusic? has the critical consensus of the album at an 8.2 out of 10, based on six reviews.

Robert Kazandjian of Clash praised the album calling it "remarkable" added "12-track project explores the collapse of a marriage, financial turmoil, anxiety, self-doubt and self-care. A lesser rapper might sink in the mire, but Open Mike has always been dope on the mic, and Anime, Trauma and Divorce find him at his best". Tim Sentz of Beats Per Minute stated, "Anime, Trauma and Divorce is a self-help rap record that manages to be heart-breaking and humorous at the same time, and never takes its audience for granted, which is a rare find in any medium". Emma Swann of DIY said, "Anime, Trauma and Divorce is as wry as documents of desperate times get. Life may have given Open Mike Eagle some fresh citrus fruit, but this resulting record is some sweet, sweet lemonade". Liam Inscoe-Jones of The Line of Best Fit wrote, "If this sounds heavy then the album’s crowning achievement is that it often doesn’t feel that way, buoyed by percussive production from Black Milk, Gold Panda, Frank Leone and others, and Mike’s dark humour". Skye Butchard of Loud and Quiet resumed that "this record will earn the cultish acclaim coming its way". Matthew Ismael Ruiz of Pitchfork said, "he made an album as bleak—and funny—as anything he’s ever done, digging deep into his sense of self with the same sardonic wit that made his breakout LP Dark Comedy so impressive. It helps that he’s not entirely alone". AllMusic's Paul Simpson said, "The album's numerous anime references will be lost on listeners who don't follow the art form, but nearly anyone can relate to his confusion, weariness, and desire to set things back on the right path". Similarly, Robert Christgau said that "anime fans will understand the lyrical details better than I can", but applauded the rapper for finally turning "confessional" and "the atmospheric beats of Nedarb" for ultimately making the album a success.

== Track listing ==
Anime, Trauma and Divorce track listing
No.	Title	Writer(s)	Producer(s)	Length
1.	"Death Parade"	Michael Eagle; Caleb Stone	Stone	2:26
2.	"Headass (Idiot Shinji)" (featuring Video Dave)	Eagle; Black Milk; Video Dave; Thomas Lee Barrett	Black Milk	3:24
3.	"Sweatpants Spiderman"	Eagle; Stone	Stone	2:39
4.	"Bucciarati" (featuring Kari Faux)	Eagle; Stone; Kari Faux; Jordan Katz	Caleb Stone	3:58
5.	"Asa's Bop" (featuring Lil A$e)	Eagle; Frank Leone	Leone	2:41
6.	"The Edge of New Clothes"	Eagle; Loden	Loden	3:11
7.	"Everything Ends Last Year"	Eagle; Stone	Stone	2:22
8.	"The Black Mirror Episode"	Eagle; Loden	Loden	3:03
9.	"Wtf Is Self Care"	Eagle; Gold Panda	Gold Panda	2:11
10.	"I'm a Joestar (Black Power Fantasy)"	Eagle; Leone	Leone	3:05
11.	"Airplane Boneyard"	Eagle; Leone	Leone	2:26
12.	"Fifteen Twenty Feet Ocean Nah (Live From the Joco Cruise)" (featuring Lil A$e)	Eagle; Nedarb	Nedarb	3:36
Total length:				34:42

== Personnel ==
- Michael W. Eagle II – main artist, executive producer
- Video Dave – featured artist (track 2)
- Kari Faux – featured artist (track 4)
- Lil A$e – featured artist (tracks: 5, 12)
- Davide Rossi – strings (track 2)
- Jordan Katz – brass (tracks: 3, 7, 10), bass (track 11)
- Caleb Stone – producer (tracks: 1, 3, 4, 7)
- Curtis Cross – producer (track 2)
- Frank Leone – producer (tracks: 5, 10, 11)
- Loden – producer (tracks: 6, 8)
- Gold Panda – producer (track 9)
- Nedarb Nagrom – producer (track 12)
- Garret "Jacknife" Lee – mixing, executive producer
- Kevin Moo – mastering
- Adam R Garcia – art direction
- Graham Walzer – photography
