= Drown Out =

Studio album by Daedelus
- Released: September 17, 2013
- Genre: Electronic
- Length: 44:49
- Label: Anticon
- Producer: Daedelus

Daedelus chronology
Bespoke (2011)	Drown Out (2013)	The Light Brigade (2014)

Professional ratings
Aggregate scores
Source	Rating
Metacritic	66/100
Review scores
Source	Rating
AllMusic	3.5/5 stars
Clash	7/10
Exclaim!	7/10
Pitchfork	5.7/10
Resident Advisor	4.0/5
The Skinny	4/5 stars

Drown Out is a studio album by American electronic music producer Daedelus. It was released on Anticon in 2013.

== Critical reception ==
At Metacritic, which assigns a weighted average score out of 100 to reviews from mainstream critics, the album received an average score of 66% based on 7 reviews, indicating "generally favorable reviews".

Jason Lymangrover of AllMusic gave the album 3.5 stars out of 5, saying: "It's the type of album that will be most apt to impress aspiring producers, but also hip enough that it could serve as a backing soundtrack for a dinner party too." Bram E. Gieben of The Skinny gave the album 4 stars out of 5, calling it "another fantastic album from a genuinely unique producer."

== Track listing ==
No.	Title	Length
1.	"Flat Faded"	3:38
2.	"Paradiddle"	3:15
3.	"Tiptoes"	4:35
4.	"Frisson"	5:18
5.	"Perpetually"	2:41
6.	"At Attentions"	2:37
7.	"Keep Still"	2:43
8.	"Abandon"	4:17
9.	"Music Concrete"	2:46
10.	"-Ísimo"	4:44
11.	"Red-Tail & Peregrine"	4:48
12.	"Eureka"	3:30

== Personnel ==
Credits adapted from liner notes.

- Daedelus – composition, performance
- Amir Yaghmai – vocals (3, 12), guitar (12)
- Laura Darlington – vocals (3)
- Hrishikesh Hirway – vocals (3)
- Pete Curry – drums (3, 9, 12)
- Andres Renteria – drums (3)
- Louis Cole – drums (4)
- Adam Benjamin – keyboards (5)
- Chris Alfaro – skateboards (9)
- Phil Nisco – skateboards (9)
- Sunny Graves – composition (10), performance (10)
- Kelli Cain – vocals (11), keyboards (11)
- John Tejada – mastering
- Ghostshrimp – artwork
- Low Limit – layout
