= Love to Make Music To =

Studio album by Daedelus
- Released: June 9, 2008
- Genre: Electronic
- Length: 54:58
- Label: Ninja Tune
- Producer: Daedelus

Daedelus chronology
Live at Low End Theory (2008)	Love to Make Music To (2008)	Bespoke (2011)

Singles from Love to Make Music To
- 1. "Fair Weather Friends" Released: 2007; 2. "Hrs:Mins:Secs" Released: 2008; 3. "Make It So" Released: 2008

Professional ratings
Review scores
Source	Rating
AllMusic	4/5 stars
BBC	mixed
Drowned in Sound	7/10
Exclaim!	favorable
The Guardian	4/5 stars
OC Weekly	favorable
Pitchfork	4.5/10
The Skinny	4/5 stars
Spin	7/10

Love to Make Music To is a studio album by American electronic music producer Daedelus. It was released on Ninja Tune in 2008.

== Critical reception ==
Michael Slevin of The Skinny gave the album 4 stars out of 5, saying: "The songs on this album are eclectic yet symbiotic, with breakbeat convoluting with jaunty showtunes in one corner, and low key electro-tinged hip-hop flirting with dancey pseudo-jazz numbers in the other." Tim Sendra of AllMusic gave the album 4 stars out of 5, saying, "Love to Make Music To may not be the best Daedelus album, but it's not far from it -- and that makes it just about the best electronic pop you are likely to hear in 2008." Colin Buttimer of BBC called it "an enjoyably varied album, full of texture, emotion and playful ideas."

== Track listing ==
No.	Title	Length
1.	"Fair Weather Friends"	3:06
2.	"Touchtone" (featuring Paperboy and Taz Arnold)	3:29
3.	"Twist the Kids" (featuring N'fa)	4:00
4.	"Get Off Your Hi-Hats"	4:53
5.	"My Beau" (featuring Erika Rose and Paperboy)	3:07
6.	"Make It So" (featuring Michael Johnson)	3:54
7.	"Only for the Heartstrings"	3:18
8.	"I Car(ry) Us"	3:31
9.	"I Took Two"	3:23
10.	"Assembly Lines"	3:33
11.	"Bass in It" (featuring Taz Arnold)	3:16
12.	"Hrs:Mins:Secs"	3:36
13.	"If We Should" (featuring Laura Darlington)	4:11
14.	"Drummery Jam"	4:00
15.	"You're the One" (featuring Om'Mas Keith)	3:41

== Personnel ==
Credits adapted from liner notes.

- Daedelus – instruments, artwork
- Michael Johnson – guitar (1), synthesizer (1), vocals (6)
- Paperboy – vocals (2, 5)
- Taz Arnold – vocals (2, 11)
- N'fa – vocals (3)
- Erika Rose – vocals (5)
- Ben Wendel – Rhodes piano (10), digital horn (10)
- Laura Darlington – vocals (13)
- Om'Mas Keith – vocals (15)
- Daddy Kev – mixing, mastering
- Sasha Barr – artwork
