= Bad Rap (film) =

- Directed by: Salima Koroma
- Produced by: Salima Koroma, Jaeki Cho
- Starring: Dumbfounddead, Awkwafina, Rekstizzy, Lyricks
- Release date: April 13, 2016

Bad Rap is a 2016 documentary directed by Salima Koroma, and produced by Jaeki Cho. The documentary follows the lives of Korean-American hip-hop artists Dumbfounddead, Awkwafina, Rekstizzy, and Lyricks, and their struggle to garner credibility in the American hip-hop industry. Bad Rap premiered at the Tribeca Film Festival on April 13, 2016, and has since been screened at twelve other film festivals around the world. As of September 7, 2017, the film has been made available on the iTunes Store, Amazon, VUDU, Google Play, and Netflix.

== Synopsis ==
Bad Rap features the stories of four prominent Korean-American hip-hop figures, all at different points in their careers, but sharing the same goal of succeeding in the mainstream. It traces through the early days of freestyle battle aficionado Jonathan Park, better known as "Dumbfoundead", and his personal struggle with marketability in the modern hip-hop industry. The film also focuses on how developing artists such as New Yorker David "Rekstizzy" Lee and Richard "Lyricks" Lee carve out their niche within the genre, placing a focus on creative expression and artistic identity. Rising star Nora "Awkwafina" Lum discusses her relationship with her race and career, and her perceived responsibilities as a double-minority in the genre.

The film places a great emphasis on the question of authenticity in hip-hop and what the role of aspiring artists in the genre should be, using the stories of pioneers such as MC Jin to explore the question on a wide spectrum. Bad Rap chooses not to focus on the boundaries set by the artists' heritage, but the struggle of working to fit into a niche community that rejects them for more than just where they come from. Quoting director Koroma, “The themes we explore of fighting to belong in a particular community, of having your parents and friends tell you differently but nonetheless following your passion—those are universal.”

== Cast ==
- Jonathan Park (Dumbfoundead) as himself
- Nora Lum (Awkwafina) as herself
- David Lee (Rekstizzy) as himself
- Richard Lee (Lyricks) as himself

The documentary also features special appearances by MC Jin, Shogunna, Traphik, Jay Park, Kero One, The Fung Brothers, Far East Movement, Ted Chung, Danny Chung, Oliver Wang, Ebro Darden, Damien Scott, Riggs Morales, and Jonathan Briks.

== Awards and reception ==
Since its release, Bad Rap has been met with generally positive reviews; it was listed as a must-watch film during the 2016 Tribeca Film Festival by publications including the Rolling Stone, VICE, New York Daily News, Complex, High Snobiety, and OkayPlayer. On Rotten Tomatoes, the film holds a rating of 70% based on ten critical reviews, with an average rating of 6.56/10. Reel Talk Online's Candice Frederick praises Koroma for "[opening] up the conversation to the far less discussed marginalization of Asian-American rappers in an industry dominated by African-American men."

Bad Rap won “Best Documentary Feature” at the San Diego Asian Film Festival 2016, and the Toronto Reel Asian International Film Festival 2016. The film also received the Audience Award for Best Documentary Feature at the Los Angeles Asian Pacific Film Festival.

Popular South Korean hip-hop artists Zion.T, DJ DOC, Dok2, The Quiett, Beenzino, and Crush were attendees of the film's screening at the Seoul Hip-Hop Film Festival 2016.
