= Live at Low End Theory =

Live album by Daedelus
- Released: January 22, 2008
- Recorded: 2007
- Venue: Low End Theory
- Genre: Electronic
- Length: 47:16
- Label: Alpha Pup Records
- Producer: Daedelus

Daedelus chronology
Denies the Day's Demise (2006)	Live at Low End Theory (2008)	Love to Make Music To (2008)

Professional ratings
Review scores
Source	Rating
AllMusic	4/5 stars
Pitchfork	7.1/10
PopMatters	8/10 stars
Tiny Mix Tapes	4/5 stars

Live at Low End Theory is a live album by American electronic music producer Daedelus. It was released on Alpha Pup Records in 2008. Recorded live at Low End Theory in July 2007, it was mixed and mastered by Daddy Kev.

== Critical reception ==
Marisa Brown of AllMusic gave the album 4 stars out of 5, saying: "Although Daedelus certainly relies on a lot of computer wizardry when he crafts his albums, the producer proves that he's just as capable of putting on an energetic and dynamic live show as anyone else, be they electronica artists or not." Tim O Neil of PopMatters gave the album 8 stars out of 10, saying: "It's casual, almost scattershot in a charming way that offers up an entirely different vantage on the man's music."

== Track listing ==
No.	Title	Length
1.	"Put a Spell"	5:00
2.	"Cast a Wish"	3:17
3.	"Press Snooze"	3:25
4.	"Samba Grandly"	1:49
5.	"Ready the End"	2:01
6.	"Disco, Disco, Disco"	6:51
7.	"Play It Again"	1:54
8.	"Now's the Time"	2:24
9.	"Say Yes"	3:24
10.	"Arouse Suspicion"	1:51
11.	"Break Some Hearts"	4:35
12.	"Get the Door"	3:12
13.	"Rest in Peace"	3:44
14.	"Shake Vigorously"	2:08
15.	"Hope for the Best"	1:41
