= Hella Personal Film Festival =

Studio album by Open Mike Eagle and Paul White
- Released: March 25, 2016
- Studio: Office/Space Studios
- Genre: Hip-hop
- Length: 45:33
- Label: Mello Music Group
- Producer: Paul White

Open Mike Eagle chronology
Dark Comedy (2014)	Hella Personal Film Festival (2016)	Brick Body Kids Still Daydream (2017)

Paul White chronology
Shaker Notes (2014)	Hella Personal Film Festival (2016)	Everything You've Forgotten (2017)

Singles from Hella Personal Film Festival
- 1. "I Went Outside Today" Released: March 21, 2016

Hella Personal Film Festival is a 2016 collaborative studio album by American rapper Open Mike Eagle and British record producer Paul White. It was released via Mello Music Group on March 25, 2016. Recorded in London, it features guest appearances from Aesop Rock and Hemlock Ernst. Music videos were created for "Check to Check", "Admitting the Endorphin Addiction", "Smiling (Quirky Race Doc)", and "Dang Is Invincible".

== Critical reception ==
Professional ratings
Aggregate scores
Source	Rating
Metacritic	79/100
Review scores
Source	Rating
AllMusic	4/5 stars
The A.V. Club	B+
Clash	9/10
Consequence of Sound	B
Exclaim!	8/10
HipHopDX	4.0/5
Pitchfork	7.3/10
Robert Christgau	B+
Spin	7/10

At Metacritic, which assigns a weighted average score out of 100 to reviews from mainstream critics, the album received an average score of 79, based on 9 reviews, indicating "generally favorable reviews".

Jesse Fairfax of HipHopDX gave the album a 4.0 out of 5 and stated that "Hella Personal Film Festival succeeds on the merits of Paul White's melodic beats setting the backdrop for Open Mike Eagle's woes, aggravation and sighs of relief alike." Marcus J. Moore of Pitchfork gave the album a 7.3 out of 10 and called it "refreshingly cohesive, exploring varied themes without drifting off-course." Kyle Mullin of Exclaim! gave the album an 8 out of 10, saying, "for the most part, this is an album that boasts both accessible sonics and lyrical labyrinths."

Rolling Stone placed it at number 26 on the "40 Best Rap Albums of 2016" list. HipHopDX included it on the "Most Slept-On Rap Albums of 2016" list.

== Track listing ==
All tracks are written by Michael Eagle and Paul White, with additional contributors noted.

No.	Title	Writer(s)	Length
1.	"Admitting the Endorphin Addiction"	Debbie Johnson; George Henry Johnson	3:28
2.	"I Went Outside Today" (featuring Aesop Rock)	Ian M. Bavitz	2:43
3.	"Dang Is Invincible"		2:50
4.	"Check to Check"		2:03
5.	"The Curse of Hypervigliance (In Politics, Romance, and Cohabitation)"		2:47
6.	"Insecurity"		2:31
7.	"Smiling (Quirky Race Doc)"		3:42
8.	"Leave People Alone"		3:05
9.	"A Short About a Guy That Dies Every Night"		3:03
10.	"Protectors of the Heat" (featuring Hemlock Ernst)	Samuel T. Herring	4:26
11.	"Insecurity Part 2 (The Moor the Marry Her)"		3:45
12.	"Dive Bar Support Group"		4:23
13.	"Drunk Dreaming"		2:49
14.	"Reprieve"		3:57

== Personnel ==
Credits adapted from liner notes.

- Open Mike Eagle – vocals
- Paul White – production
- Aesop Rock – featured vocals (2)
- Hemlock Ernst – featured vocals (10)
- Mara Carlyle – additional vocals (11)
- Sarah Williams White – additional vocals (12)
- Daddy Kev – mixing, mastering
- Owen Richards – photography
- Michael Tolle – executive production
