= Bespoke (album) =

Studio album by Daedelus
- Released: April 11, 2011
- Genre: Electronic
- Length: 41:35
- Label: Ninja Tune
- Producer: Daedelus, Poirier

Daedelus chronology
Love to Make Music To (2008)	Bespoke (2011)	Drown Out (2013)

Singles from Bespoke
- 1. "Tailor-Made" Released: 2011

Professional ratings
Aggregate scores
Source	Rating
Metacritic	72/100
Review scores
Source	Rating
AllMusic	3.5/5 stars
BBC	favorable
Pitchfork	6.8/10
Resident Advisor	3.0/5
The Skinny	4/5 stars
XLR8R	6/10

Bespoke is a studio album by American electronic music producer Daedelus. It was released on Ninja Tune in 2011.

== Critical reception ==
At Metacritic, which assigns a weighted average score out of 100 to reviews from mainstream critics, the album received an average score of 72% based on 12 reviews, indicating "generally favorable reviews".

Larry Fitzmaurice of Pitchfork gave the album a 6.8 out of 10, calling it Daedelus' "first truly decent-sounding album". He added: "The whole thing is an enjoyable mess, and when this record is really cooking, listening to it has the pleasurable effect of someone messing with a radio dial." Bram Gieben of The Skinny gave the album 4 stars out of 5, saying: "Musical ideas crash and break against each other in a seamless, organic way, always with a sense of playful wonder." Mike Diver of BBC called it "another fantastically enjoyable album from an artist whose modus operandi, above anything else, seems to be ensuring his audience is having the best possible time."

== Track listing ==
No.	Title	Length
1.	"Tailor-Made" (featuring Milosh)	4:40
2.	"Sew, Darn, Mend"	4:15
3.	"Penny Loafers" (featuring Inara George)	4:25
4.	"One and Lonely" (featuring Young Dad)	4:16
5.	"Suit Yourself"	3:35
6.	"What Can You Do?" (featuring Busdriver)	2:53
7.	"French Cuffs" (featuring Baths)	3:40
8.	"In Tatters" (featuring Kelela Mizanekristos)	3:17
9.	"Slowercase D"	6:15
10.	"Overwhelmed" (featuring Bilal)	3:38
11.	"Nightcap"	0:41

== Personnel ==
Credits adapted from liner notes.

- Daedelus – composition, arrangement, production
- Milosh – vocals (1)
- Young Dad – background vocals (1), vocals (4)
- Pete Curry – percussion (1, 3), drums (2, 7, 8, 9, 10), guitar (9, 10)
- Amir Yaghmai – guitar (2), violin (4), whistling (4)
- Inara George – vocals (3)
- Andres Renteria – percussion (3)
- Om'Mas Keith – keyboards (5), basslines (5)
- Busdriver – vocals (6)
- Baths – vocals (7)
- Kelela Mizanekristos – vocals (8)
- Bilal – vocals (10)
- Poirier – production (10)
- Stephen Kaye – mixing, mastering
- Lina Lund Mortensen – textile design, art direction
- Hrishikesh Hirway – photography
