= Open Mike Eagle =

American rapper and comedian (born 1980)

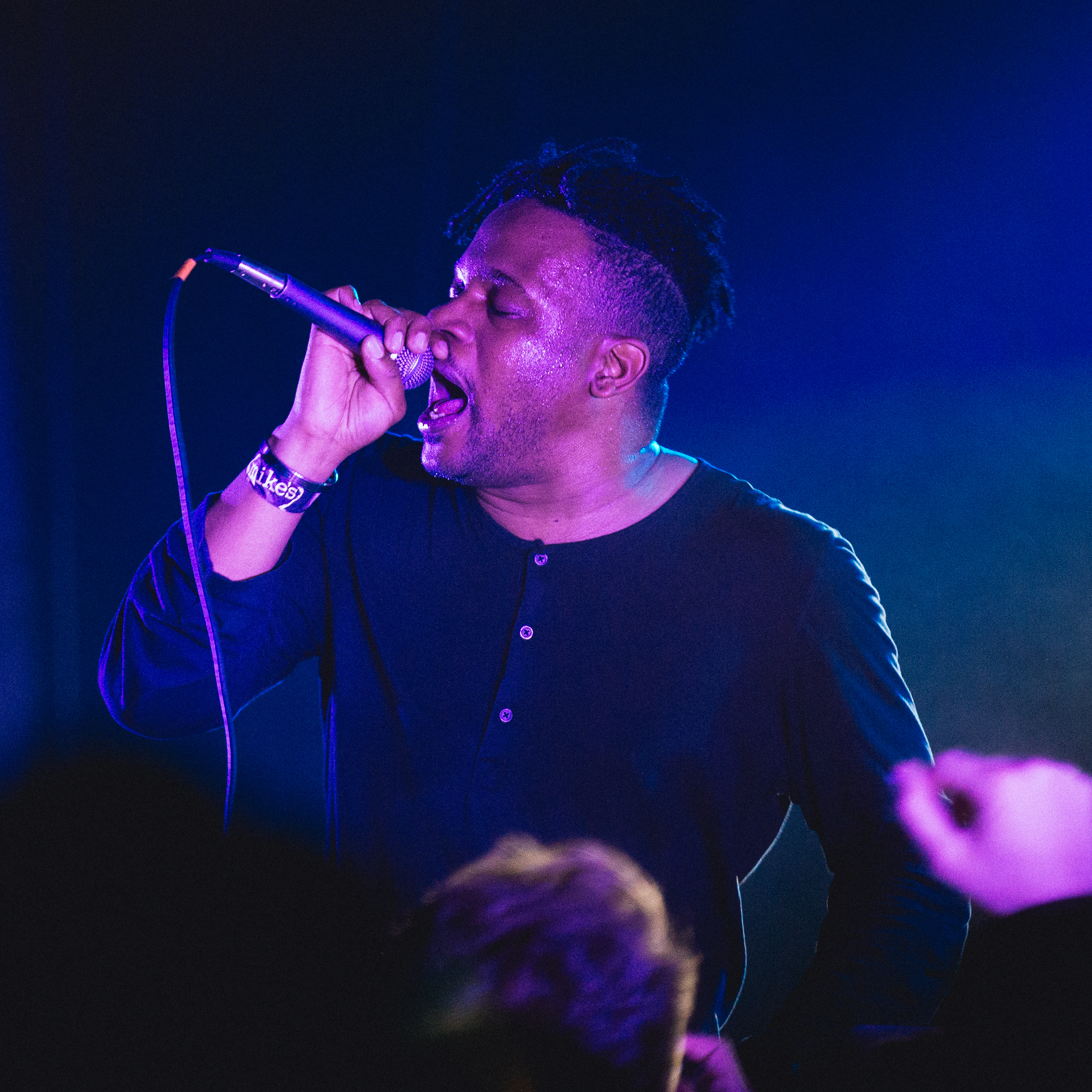
- Eagle performing in 2017

Background information
- Also known as: Mike Eagle
- Born: November 14, 1980 (age 45)
- Origin: Chicago, Illinois, U.S.
- Genres: Alternative hip-hop; hip-hop
- Occupations: Rapper; songwriter; Record producer; comedian
- Years active: 2003–present
- Labels: Mush; Fake Four Inc.; Hellfyre Club; Mello Music Group; Auto Reverse
- Member of: Thirsty Fish; Swim Team; Cavanaugh; Project Blowed; Previous Industries
- Website: mikeeagle.net

Michael W. Eagle II (born November 14, 1980), better known by his pseudonym Open Mike Eagle, is an American rapper, record producer and comedian. Originally from Chicago, Illinois, he is now based in Los Angeles, California, where he is a member of the hip-hop collective Project Blowed. He has also been a member of Thirsty Fish, Swim Team, and Cavanaugh.

== Early life ==
Born November 14, 1980, Eagle grew up in Chicago's Robert Taylor Homes and lived with his grandparents until he was 13, at which point he moved in with his mother. Eagle also has a younger brother and sister. He attended Whitney M. Young Magnet High School and went on to Southern Illinois University Carbondale where he majored in psychology. He became the 2nd African American homecoming king in the school's history, and a member of Alpha Phi Alpha fraternity.

Eagle attended graduate school for one year, but quickly moved to Los Angeles to live with his dad. He began working for AmeriCorps for six months before getting a job at a non-profit halfway house. As he continued to work odd jobs, Mike rapped as a hobby before discovering Project Blowed and then creating Thirsty Fish.

== Career ==
=== Music ===
Eagle, with Dumbfoundead and Psychosiz, formed the rap trio Thirsty Fish. They released their first album, Testing the Waters, in 2007 and their second album, Watergate, on Mush Records in 2011. All three members of Thirsty Fish are also co-founders of the battle crew Swim Team. In 2008, Swim Team released the mixtape Ocean's 11.

In 2010, Eagle released his first solo album, Unapologetic Art Rap, on Mush Records. The album features Nocando, Busdriver, and Serengeti. His second album, Rappers Will Die of Natural Causes, was released on Hellfyre Club in 2011. It features vocal contributions from P.O.S and MC Paul Barman.

In 2012, Eagle released an album, 4nml Hsptl, on Fake Four Inc. It is entirely produced by Awkward. In that year, he co-authored and participated in a study conducted by the National Institutes of Health that observed the locations of increased brain activity during freestyle rapping.

In 2014, Eagle released an album, Dark Comedy. In 2016, he released Hella Personal Film Festival, a collaborative album with Paul White. In 2017, he released Brick Body Kids Still Daydream, a concept album about the Robert Taylor Homes, a public housing project in Chicago, Illinois. It was placed at number 34 on Rolling Stone's "50 Best Albums of 2017" list, as well as number 49 on Pitchfork's "50 Best Albums of 2017" list. In 2018, he released an EP, What Happens When I Try to Relax.

=== Podcasts and comedy ===
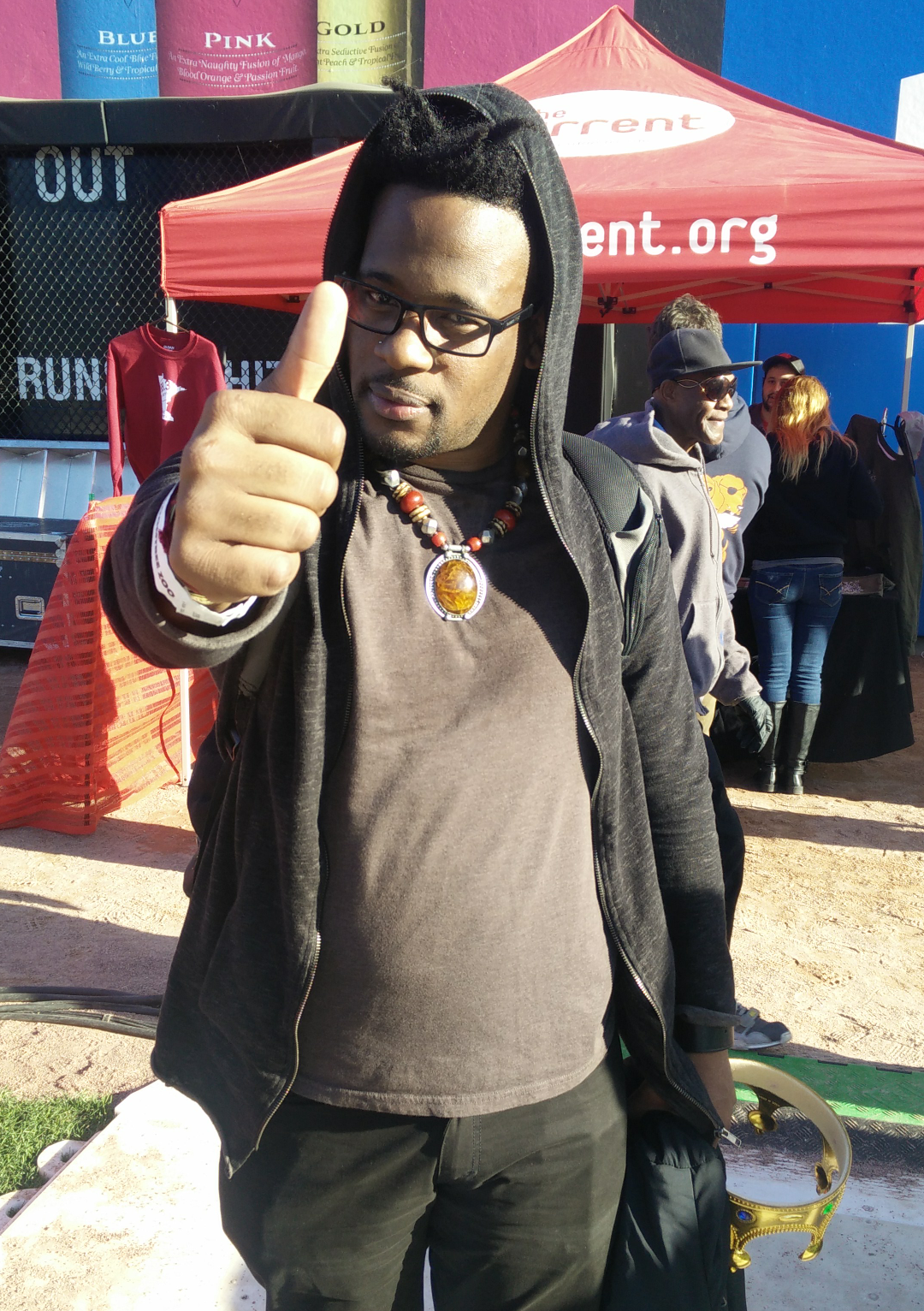
Eagle in 2015

In June 2015, Eagle, along with John Moe, launched "Conversation Parade", a podcast in which the two discuss the Cartoon Network animated television series Adventure Time. The podcast has featured guests like Jeremy Shada, John DiMaggio, Hynden Walch, Adam Muto, Kent Osborne, Niki Yang, Olivia Olson, Jesse Moynihan, Jessica DiCicco, Elizabeth Ito, and Neko Case. More recently, Open Mike Eagle podcasts regularly on his podcast Secret Skin. Mike Eagle also co-hosts the pro wrestling podcast Tights and Fights with Hal Lublin and Danielle Radford on the Maximum Fun Network. Mike Eagle also hosts the podcast "What Had Happened Was," during which he conducts in-depth interviews with hip-hop artists about their careers. During Season 1, Mike Eagle spoke with producer Prince Paul, and during Season 2 he interviewed rapper and producer El-P. Season 3 featured Mike interviewing producer and record executive Dante Ross, while Season 4 featured Questlove.

=== Film and television ===
Eagle has expressed his appreciation for Adventure Time. During Adventure Time's tenth season, he appeared in the episode "Son of Rap Bear", voicing a rapping gingerbread man. On April 18, 2017, Comedy Central announced they were greenlighting The New Negroes, a stand-up and musical series co-hosted by Open Mike Eagle and Baron Vaughn. The New Negroes premiered on Comedy Central on April 9, 2019, and includes a new music video each episode in which Eagle collaborates with other hip-hop artists including MF Doom, Danny Brown, Phonte, and Lizzo. He also appeared in three episodes of Netflix's 2020 show History of Swear Words. He writes original songs for AppleTV+'s Strange Planet.

== Style and influences ==
Eagle has coined his own term for the style of some of his music, which he calls "art rap". In a 2016 interview, he stated that They Might Be Giants influenced him.

== Personal life ==
Eagle met his ex-wife Tiffany at a TransAfrica conference at UCLA, and they have one son together. They divorced in 2020.

== Discography ==
=== Studio albums ===
Solo

- Unapologetic Art Rap (Mush Records, 2010)
- Rappers Will Die of Natural Causes (Hellfyre Club, 2011)
- 4nml Hsptl (Fake Four Inc., 2012) (produced by Awkward)
- Dark Comedy (Mello Music Group, 2014)
- Brick Body Kids Still Daydream (Mello Music Group, 2017)
- Anime, Trauma and Divorce (Auto Reverse Records, 2020)
- Component System with the Auto Reverse (Auto Reverse Records, 2022)
- Another Triumph of Ghetto Engineering (Auto Reverse Records, 2023)
- Neighborhood Gods Unlimited (Auto Reverse Records, 2025)

Collaborations

- Testing the Waters (Bell Rang Records, 2008) (with Dumbfoundead and Psychosiz, as Thirsty Fish)
- Watergate (Mush Records, 2011) (with Dumbfoundead and Psychosiz, as Thirsty Fish)
- Time and Materials (Mello Music Group, 2015) (with Serengeti, as Cavanaugh)
- Hella Personal Film Festival (Mello Music Group, 2016) (with by Paul White)
- Service Merchandise (Merge Records, 2024) (with Video Dave and Still Rift, as Previous Industries)
- Doomed! (Backwoodz Studioz, 2026) (with Kenny Segal)

=== Mixtapes ===
- Premeditated Folly (2008)
- Ocean's 11 (Project Blowed, 2008) (with Dumbfoundead, et al., as Swim Team)
- The Dark Dark Purple Tape (2018)

=== EPs ===
- The Finger Booger EP (2003)
- Another Roadside Attraction V2 (2009)
- Art Rap After Party (Mush Records, 2010)
- Extended Nightmares Getdown: The Dark Blue Door (Hellfyre Club, 2011)
- Rent Party Extension (Hellfyre Club, 2012)
- Sir Rockabye (Hellfyre Club, 2013)
- Invasion (2013) (with Dumbfoundead and Psychosiz, as Thirsty Fish)
- A Special Episode Of (Mello Music Group, 2015)
- What Happens When I Try to Relax (Auto Reverse Records, 2018)
- The New Negroes with Baron Vaughn & Open Mike Eagle: Season 1 Soundtrack (2019)
- Quarantine Recordings (Auto Reverse Records, 2020) (with Serengeti, as Cavanaugh)
- Evergreen Plaza (Merge Records, 2025) (with Video Dave and Still Rift, as Previous Industries)

=== Singles ===
- "I Rock" (Mush Records, 2010)
- "Home Movies" (self-released, 2012) (with Dumbfoundead and Psychosiz, as Thirsty Fish)

=== Guest appearances ===
- Abstract Rude – "Thynk Eye Can (Blowedian Next Generation Mix)" from Rejuvenation (2009)
- Nocando – "DSD2" from Jimmy the Lock (2010)
- Busdriver – "Deer God" from Computer Cooties (2010)
- Flash Bang Grenada – "In a Perfect World" from 10 Haters (2011)
- Mega Ran – "Now Hiring" from Mega Ran 10 (2011)
- Myka 9 & Factor Chandelier – "5 Mikes" from Sovereign Soul (2012)
- Zilla Rocca – "Full Spectrum 2" from Full Spectrum (2012)
- Busdriver – "Werner Herzog" from Arguments with Dreams (2012)
- Cars & Trains – "Stay Awake" from We Are All Storms (2012)
- Sole – "Definition of Slave" from A Ruthless Criticism of Everything Existing (2012)
- Premrock & Willie Green – "Jogger" from Premrock & Willie Green (2012)
- Ras G – Kampala Blackouts (2012)
- Random – "Super Move" from Language Arts Volume 2 (2012)
- Illogic & Blockhead – "From Scratch" from Preparing for Capture 2 (2012)
- Curly Castro – "My Beloved" (2013)
- Loden – "An Evening with Open Mike Eagle" from The Star-Eyed Condition (2013)
- Milo – "The Otherground Pizza Party" from Things That Happen at Night (2013)
- Kool A.D. – "Red Wine" from 63 (2013)
- Billy Woods – "Fool's Gold" from Dour Candy (2013)
- Armand Hammer – "Fools Gold Remix" from Half Measures (2013)
- Hot Sugar – "Watermelon" from Made Man (2013)
- L'Orange & Stik Figa – "Decorated Silence" from The City Under the City (2013)
- Mishka & Rad Reef – "Hyperbolic Chamber Music II" (2013)
- Gregory Pepper & Madadam – "Stirring Dead Leaves" from Big Huge Truck (2013)
- Factor – "Stone Cold" from Woke Up Alone (2013)
- Armand Hammer – "New Museum" from Race Music (2013)
- The MC Type – "Preacher Song" from A Good Tattoo (2013)
- MC Frontalot – "Much Chubbier" from Question Bedtime (2014)
- Megabusive w/ Awkward – "Apexes and Peaks" and "So Much" from Hell on Hell (2014)
- Drummachinemike – "The Anti-Socialite's Theme Song", "Bowling Tips" and "The Kids Don't Like Me" from Drum Machine Music (2014)
- Ardamus – "If Only I Gave Ah", from I Can't Replace Me, Pt. 1: Improve (2014)
- Busdriver – "When the Tooth-lined Horizon Blinks" from Perfect Hair (2014)
- Milo – "Objectifying Rabbits" from A Toothpaste Suburb (2014)
- Eligh – "Get Like Me" from 80 Hrtz (2015)
- Abstract Rude – "Kan of Whoop Ass Reprise" from Keep the Feel: A Legacy of Hip Hop Soul (2015)
- L'Orange & Kool Keith – "Meanwhile, Back Home" from Time? Astonishing! (2015)
- Memory Man – "Funtastic" from Broadcast One (2015)
- Milo – "True Nen" from So the Flies Don't Come (2015)
- Aesop Rock – "Syrup" from The Impossible Kid deluxe edition (2016)
- Blu & Fate – "Oblivia" from Open Your Optics to Optimism (2016)
- Factor Chandelier – "Dozer II" from Factoria (2016)
- P.O.S – "Infinite Scroll" from Chill, Dummy (2017)
- Uncommon Nasa – "Extra Lives" from Written at Night (2017)
- Buy Muy Drugs – "American Robot" from Buy Muy Drugs (2017)
- Czarface & MF Doom – "Phantoms" from Czarface Meets Metal Face (2018)
- Left at London – "I Split My Ribs Open" from Transgender Street Legend Vol. 1 (2018)
- MC Paul Barman – "Echo Chamber" and "Believe That" from Echo Chamber (2018)
- The Skull Eclipses – "Gone" from The Skull Eclipses (2018)
- Blockhead – "Slippery Slope" from Free Sweatpants (2019)
- Two Door Cinema Club – "Nice to See You" from False Alarm (2019)
- Awol One – "I Can Do That" from Tony the Walrus (2020)
- R.A.P. Ferreira – "Pinball" from Purple Moonlight Pages (2020)
- Rav - "Ass Backwards" (2021)
- Blockhead – "Mastering How To Land" from The Aux (2023)
- COOLETHAN – "Know Us" from You Can Never Go Back (2024)
- Aesop Rock - "So Be It" from Black Hole Superette (2025)
- Aesop Rock - "One Thing" from Trouble Mountain (2026)

=== Compilation appearances ===
- "Silent Protest (A Modest Proposal)" on Prometheus (2011)
- "Celebrity Reduction Prayer" and "Dark Comedy Late Show" on Persona (2015)
- "How to Be Super Petty to Your Ex" on 30 Days, 50 Songs (2016)
