= Dying Machines =

US musical group

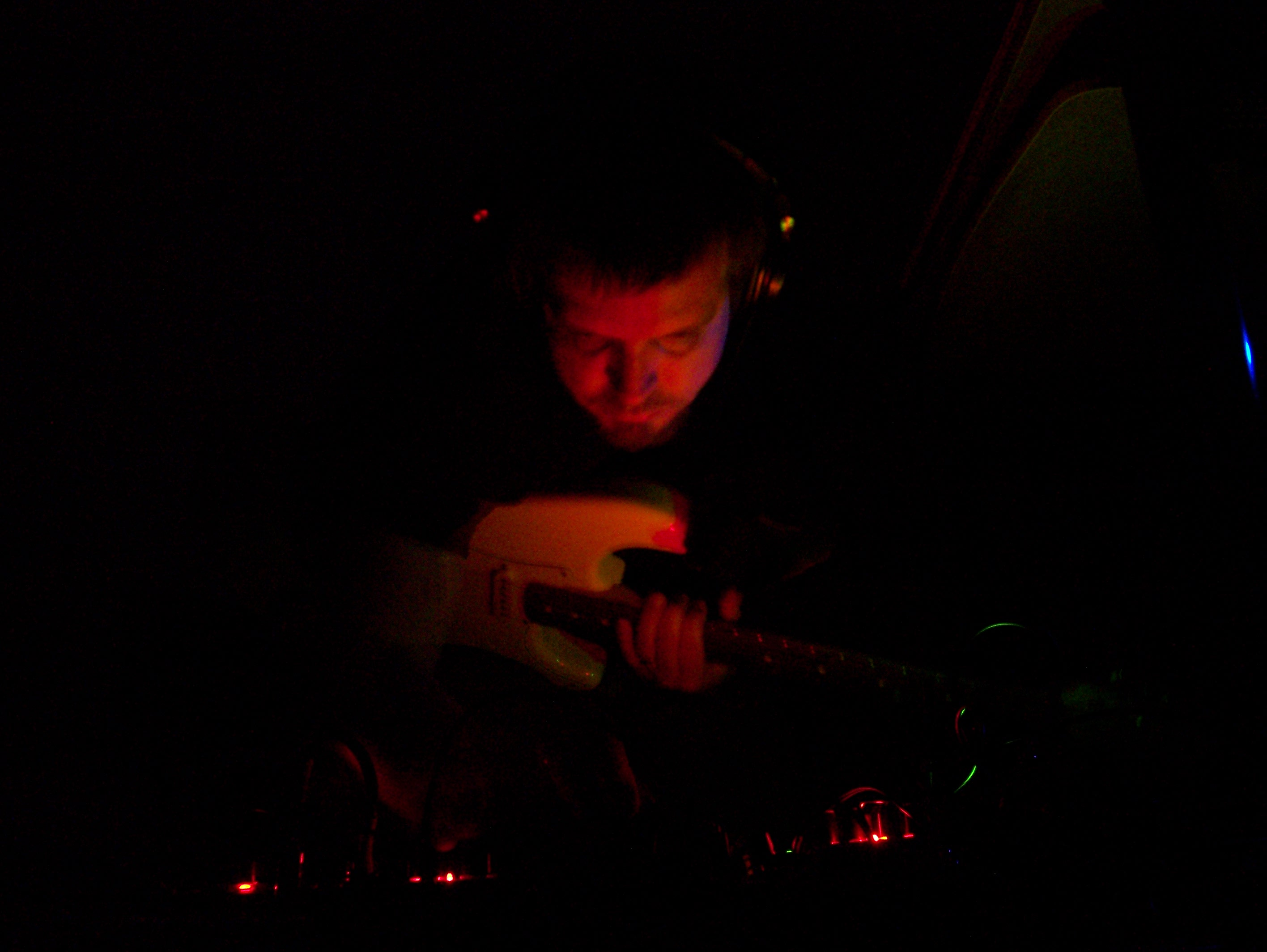
- Dying Machines performing in 2012

Background information
- Origin: New Orleans, Louisiana, U.S.
- Genres: Ambient, neoclassical, experimental
- Years active: 2011–present
- Labels: Mush Records, Radio Obscura
- Members: Thomas Buschbach
- Website: dyingmachines.net

Dying Machines is an American neoclassical ambient band formed in New Orleans, Louisiana, in 2011 by Thomas Buschbach.

Citing influences including Hans Zimmer, Stars of the Lid, Arvo Pärt and John Murphy, Dying Machines combines effects-laden guitars with classical instrumentation to create an emotional blend of ambient, orchestral, film music, and post-rock.

Dying Machines is currently signed to Mush Records, who released Nicht Sprechen and What I Have Not Forgotten in 2012 and 2013 respectively. Both EPs were critically well-received despite the relative obscurity of the genre.

== Discography ==
=== Albums ===
- You (2015)
- A Map of the Stars (2024)

=== EPs ===
- Nicht Sprechen (2012)
- What I Have Not Forgotten (2013)
- Someday Home (unreleased) (2014)
