= Neighborhood Gods Unlimited =

Studio album by Open Mike Eagle
- Released: July 11, 2025
- Studio: Office/Space
- Length: 39:00
- Label: Auto Reverse
- Producers: Child Actor; August Fanon; Lalive; K-Nite; Nolan the Ninja; Playa Haze; Kenny Segal

Open Mike Eagle chronology
Another Triumph of Ghetto Engineering (2023)	Neighborhood Gods Unlimited (2025)	Doomed! (2026)

Singles from Neighborhood Gods Unlimited
- 1. "Contraband (The Plug Has Bags of Me)" Released: June 3, 2025; 2. "My Co-Worker Clark Kent's Secret Black Box" Released: August 6, 2025

Neighborhood Gods Unlimited is the tenth studio album by American rapper and comedian Open Mike Eagle. It was released on July 11, 2025, via Auto Reverse Records in LP, CD and digital formats.

== Background ==
The album was preceded by Open Mike's 2023 release, Another Triumph of Ghetto Engineering.

The lead single, "Contraband (The Plug Has Bags of Me)", was released on June 3, 2025. It was followed by the second single "My Co-Worker Clark Kent's Secret Black Box" on August 6, 2025, alongside a music video directed by Stoney Sharp.

== Critical reception ==
Professional ratings
Aggregate scores
Source	Rating
Metacritic	84/100
Review scores
Source	Rating
AllMusic	4.5/5 stars
Beats Per Minute	82%
Paste	8.3/10
Pitchfork	8.5/10

According to the review aggregator Metacritic, Neighborhood Gods Unlimited received "universal acclaim" based on a weighted average score of 84 out of 100 from 6 critic scores.

John Amen of Beats Per Minute described the album as "a potent, enticing, and, yes, elusive project," giving it a rating of 82%. It received a rating of 8.5 from Pitchfork, whose reviewer Paul Thompson noted it as "conceived as a dispatch from a fictional cable channel with a budget so small that it can only broadcast for one hour a week." Casey Epstein-Gross of Paste assigned the album a score of 8.3 out of ten and described the production of the album as "the glue holding its conceptual particles together," stating "This is where Neighborhood Gods Unlimited leaves us: not with a fantasy of wholeness, but with a quiet commitment to keep searching among the shards anyway."

=== Accolades ===
Publication	Accolade	Rank	Ref.
Beats Per Minute	Top 50 Albums of 2025	13	
Consequence	The 25 Best Rap Albums of 2025	13	
HotNewHipHop	The 40 Best Rap Albums of 2025	18	
Paste	The 25 best rap albums of 2025	2	
The Ringer	The 25 Best Albums of 2025	14	
Rolling Stone	The 100 Best Albums of 2025	84	
Rolling Stone	The 25 Best Hip-Hop Albums of 2025	25	

== Track listing ==
All tracks are written by Michael Eagle, with guest artists as additional writers.

Neighborhood Gods Unlimited track listing
No.	Title	Producer(s)	Length
1.	"Woke Up Knowing Everything (Opening Theme)"	K-Nite	3:09
2.	"Me and Aquil Stealing Stuff from Work" (featuring AQ)	Child Actor	2:36
3.	"Contraband (The Plug Has Bags of Me)"	Kenny Segal	2:33
4.	"Almost Broke My Nucleus Accumbens" (featuring Still Rift)	Playa Haze; Open Mike Eagle^{[c]}	2:13
5.	"Ok but I'm the Phone Screen"	Child Actor; Open Mike Eagle^{[c]}	2:42
6.	"Michigan J. Wonder"	Lalive	2:29
7.	"Mirror Pieces in a Leather Bound Briefcase" (featuring Video Dave)	August Fanon; Open Mike Eagle^{[c]}	2:49
8.	"Relentless Hands and Feet"	Child Actor	3:02
9.	"My Co-Worker Clark Kent's Secret Black Box"	K-Nite	2:47
10.	"Rejoinder (Burning the Last Puzzle Piece)"	Nolan the Ninja; Open Mike Eagle^{[c]}	3:18
11.	"A Dream of the Midnight Baby (Not a Euphemism)"	Child Actor	2:19
12.	"Wide Leg Michael Jordan Generation X Jeans"	Child Actor	2:24
13.	"Sorry I Got Huge (Also Not a Euphemism)"	Child Actor	2:02
14.	"Unlimited Skull Voices"	Segal	3:36
Total length:			39:00

=== Note ===
- ^{^[c]} signifies a co-producer

== Personnel ==
Credits adapted from Bandcamp.

- Willie Green – mixing, mastering
- Mose Wheeler – engineering assistance
- Open Mike Eagle – executive production
- Mike Parvizi – live bass on "Contraband (The Plug Has Bags of Me)"
- Marcus Wallinder – art
- Brad Tuominen – layout
