= Unapologetic Art Rap =

Studio album by Open Mike Eagle
- Released: May 11, 2010
- Genre: Hip-hop
- Length: 45:51
- Label: Mush
- Producer: Alwayz Prolific, Adamatic, Exile, Awkward, Maestroe, Open Mike Eagle, Kuest 1, Silencio

Open Mike Eagle chronology
Unapologetic Art Rap (2010)	Rappers Will Die of Natural Causes (2011)

Singles from Unapologetic Art Rap
- 1. "I Rock" Released: April 27, 2010

Unapologetic Art Rap is the debut studio album by American hip hop artist Open Mike Eagle. It was released via Mush Records on May 11, 2010. Music videos were created for "I Rock" and "Pissy Transmissions".

== Critical reception ==
Professional ratings
Review scores
Source	Rating
Robert Christgau	(2-star Honorable Mention)
Exclaim!	favorable
Impose	favorable
Potholes in My Blog	3.5/5 stars

Ali Elabbady of Potholes in My Blog gave the album 3.5 out of 5 stars, commenting that "The production is definitely a highlight" and "Mike's performance is definitely noteworthy as well." Blake Gillespie of Impose called it "the finest representations of taxonomic boom bap rap". Kevin Jones of Exclaim! said, "Quirky, laid-back, slice-of-life rhymes littered with wide-ranging pop culture references bounce from the absolutely banal to the surprisingly political, like the no day-job dreams of 'I Rock' juxtaposed with the corrosive blaxploitation denunciations heard on 'Unapologetic.'"

== Track listing ==
No.	Title	Producer(s)	Length
1.	"Art Rap Party"	Always Prolific	3:05
2.	"Freak Flag"	Adamatic	3:37
3.	"I Rock"	Exile	2:23
4.	"Rap Protection Prayer"	Awkward	3:30
5.	"Helicopter"	Always Prolific, Maestroe	2:13
6.	"Mistakes" (featuring Alpha MC)	Always Prolific	2:33
7.	"WTF Is Art Rap?"	Always Prolific	1:32
8.	"Unapologetic" (featuring Nocando)	Awkward	3:32
9.	"Pissy Transmissions"	Open Mike Eagle	3:23
10.	"Original Butterscotch Confection" (featuring Busdriver)	Maestroe	2:20
11.	"Partly Cloudy"	Always Prolific, Maestroe	1:46
12.	"Easter Surgery" (featuring Serengeti and Jefferson DeJesus)	Kuest 1	3:03
13.	"Garbage Man"	Awkward	4:14
14.	"Mole in Your Ministry"	Silencio	4:01
15.	"Go Home" (featuring Swim Team)	Adamatic	4:39
