= Brick Body Kids Still Daydream =

Studio album by Open Mike Eagle
- Released: September 15, 2017
- Genre: Hip-hop
- Length: 39:17
- Label: Mello Music Group
- Producers: Exile, DJ Nobody, Andrew Broder, Kenny Segal, Illingsworth, Caleb Stone, Lo-Phi, Elos, Has-Lo, Toylight

Open Mike Eagle chronology
Hella Personal Film Festival (2016)	Brick Body Kids Still Daydream (2017)	Anime, Trauma and Divorce (2020)

Brick Body Kids Still Daydream is the sixth studio album by Open Mike Eagle. It was released via Mello Music Group on September 15, 2017. It includes guest appearances from Sammus and Has-Lo. It is a concept album about the Robert Taylor Homes, a public housing project in Chicago, Illinois. The cover art was illustrated by McKay Felt. Music videos were created for "95 Radios", "Brick Body Complex", "No Selling (Uncle Butch Pretending It Don't Hurt)", "Happy Wasteland Day", and "Hymnal". The album received widespread acclaim from critics and landed on several year-end lists.

== Critical reception ==
Professional ratings
Aggregate scores
Source	Rating
Metacritic	82/100
Review scores
Source	Rating
AllMusic	3.5/5 stars
Chicago Reader	favorable
Robert Christgau	A−
Consequence of Sound	B
Los Angeles Times	favorable
Pitchfork	8.1/10
Rolling Stone	3.5/5 stars
The Skinny	4/5 stars
Spin	favorable
Uproxx	favorable

The album received widespread acclaim from critics. At Metacritic, which assigns a weighted average score out of 100 to reviews from mainstream critics, the album received an average score of 82, based on 12 reviews, indicating "universal acclaim".

Matthew Ismael Ruiz of Pitchfork gave the album an 8.1 out of 10, saying, "Brick Body Kids Still Daydream serves as an antidote to dystopian depictions of the neighborhoods and communities on Chicago's South Side that are often one-dimensional, serving as a glimpse into the mind of a poet who can see the beauty and articulate it through the eyes of a child."

Andrew Gordon of The Skinny gave the album 4 out of 5 stars, calling it "[Open Mike Eagle's] most thematically coherent work yet." Aaron Williams of Uproxx said, "Fans of cascading rhymes and rewind-button-crushing wordplay will appreciate that Mike's gift of gab remains refreshingly (or stubbornly) intact in an era of stripped-down cadences and simplistic content."

=== Accolades ===
Publication	Accolade	Rank	Ref.
NPR	50 Best Albums of 2017	29	
Pitchfork	50 Best Albums of 2017	49	
Rolling Stone	50 Best Albums of 2017	34	
Stereogum	40 Best Rap Albums of 2017	16	

== Track listing ==
No.	Title	Producer(s)	Length
1.	"Legendary Iron Hood"	Exile	3:47
2.	"(How Could Anybody) Feel at Home"	DJ Nobody	4:14
3.	"Hymnal" (featuring Sammus)	Andrew Broder	3:20
4.	"No Selling (Uncle Butch Pretending It Don't Hurt)"	Kenny Segal	3:02
5.	"Happy Wasteland Day"	Exile	3:42
6.	"Daydreaming in the Projects"	Illingsworth	3:12
7.	"Brick Body Complex"	Caleb Stone	4:07
8.	"TLDR (Smithing)"	Illingsworth	2:47
9.	"Breezeway Ritual"	Lo-Phi	2:24
10.	"Wedding Ghosts"	Elos	2:18
11.	"95 Radios" (featuring Has-Lo)	Has-Lo	4:03
12.	"My Auntie's Building"	Toylight	2:15

== Personnel ==
Credits adapted from liner notes.

- Open Mike Eagle – vocals, executive production
- Dan Miller – guitar (1)
- Exile – production (1, 5)
- Jordan Katz – additional production (1, 6, 10, 11), additional live instruments
- DJ Nobody – production (2)
- Sammus – vocals (3)
- Andrew Broder – production (3)
- Kenny Segal – production (4)
- Illingsworth – production (6, 8)
- Caleb Stone – production (7)
- Lo-Phi – production (9)
- Elos – production (10)
- Has-Lo – vocals (11), production (11)
- Toylight – production (12)
- Daddy Kev – mixing, mastering
- McKay Felt – artwork
- Sarah Dalton – graphic design
- Michael Tolle – executive production
- Mark Bowen – executive production
