= Thirsty Fish =

American hip-hop group

- Origin: Los Angeles, California
- Genre: Alternative hip-hop
- Years active: 2007–present
- Labels: Project Blowed, Mush Records
- Members: Dumbfoundead; Open Mike Eagle; Psychosiz

Thirsty Fish is an American alternative hip-hop trio based in Los Angeles, California. It consists of the rappers Dumbfoundead, Open Mike Eagle and Psychosiz. Their second album, Watergate, was released on Mush Records in 2011.

== Discography ==
=== Albums ===
- Testing the Waters (2007)
- Watergate (2011)

=== EPs ===
- Invasion (2013)

=== Singles ===
- "Home Movies" (2012)
