= Gothic Tropic =

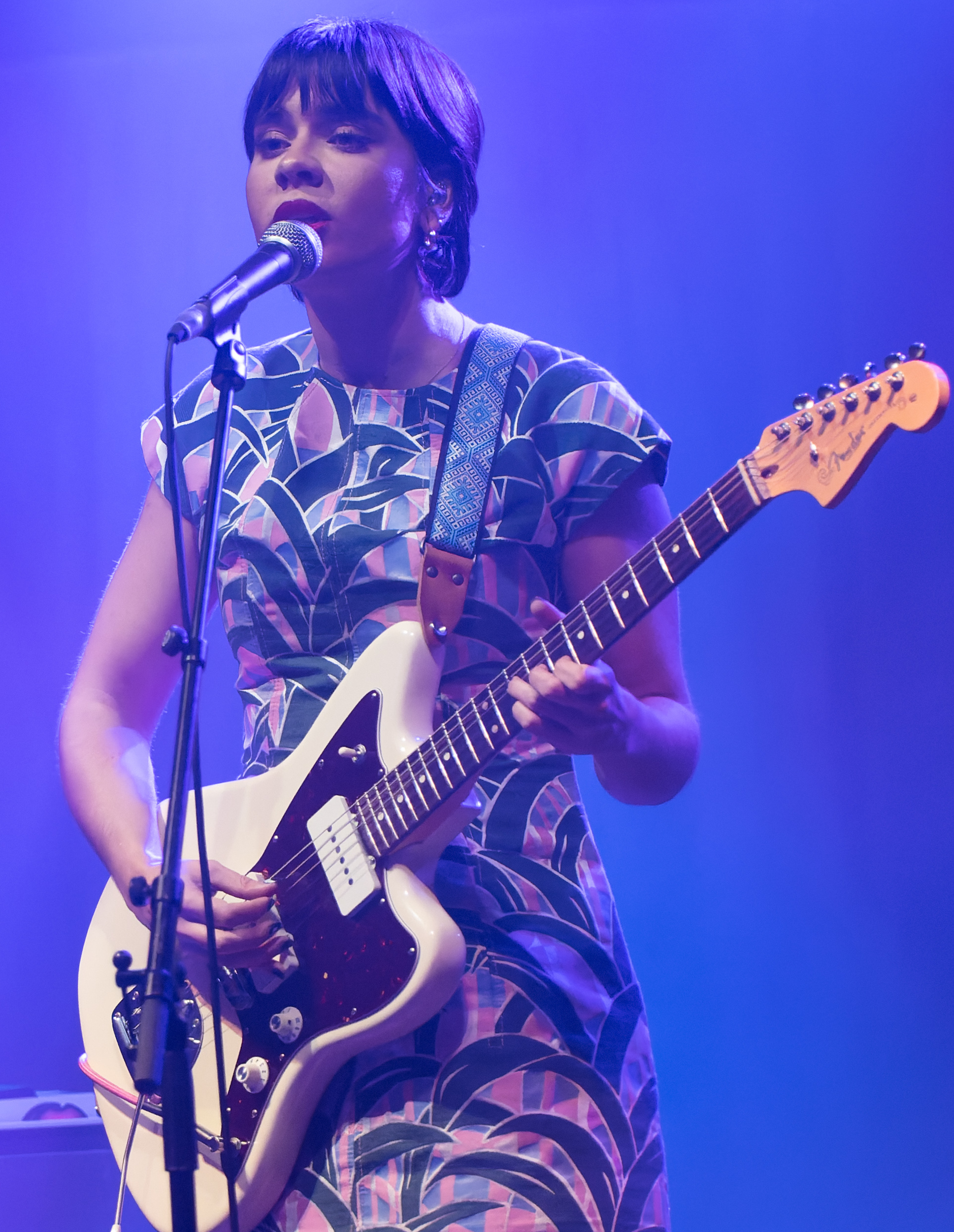
- Gothic Tropic in October 2022

Background information
- Born: Cecilia Victoria Della Peruti; September 2, 1989 (age 37)
- Origin: Plainfield, New Jersey, United States
- Genres: Indie pop; psychedelic pop; alternative rock; Indie rock
- Occupations: Singer; songwriter; Multi-instrumentalist; Performer
- Instruments: Vocals; guitar; piano; keyboards; Bass; Percussion; Sampler
- Years active: 2011–present
- Labels: Old Flame Records; Dome of Doom

Cecilia Della Peruti, better known by her stage name Gothic Tropic, is an American singer-songwriter and multi-instrumentalist from Plainfield, New Jersey. Gothic Tropic released her first EP, Awesome Problems, in 2011 and released their debut studio album, Fast or Feast, on May 19, 2017. She is most known for her single “Stronger" that was added to JJJ Radio in Australia and charted at over 60 stations across the United States.

== Life and career ==
=== Early life and career ===
Born to parents Juliana Gondek, a Polish opera singer and pedagogue at UCLA, and Carl Della Peruti, an Italian jazz composer and trombone player, music has always been a strong influence in her life. She pursued visual art before dedicating her time to making music professionally.

As a high school freshman, Cecilia started her first project, The Cheats. Based out of drummer and co-writer Kirk Podell's parents' Los Feliz garage, they frequented the Hollywood Knitting Factory and various DIY venues opening for punk acts like Dr. Know and The Dickies throughout 2004–2006. Fresh out of high school, Della Peruti was asked to perform on Rumspringa's debut full-length album, ‘Sway’ leading to a full time guitarist and vocalist position in the band from 2009 to 2011. Della Peruti began working professionally as a featured commercial talent and voice actor, and performed on Hit Record TV with Joseph Gordon Levitt, Google's Pixel campaign directed by Autumn de Wilde, Gucci's MySpace campaign, US Bank Tour Series, Pure Gear and more.

Della Peruti has performed as a multi-instrumentalist touring player for Beck, Børns and Charli XCX. Following the release of ‘Fast or Feast’, Cecilia was invited to join Beck in his touring band on vocals, guitar, and percussion. Della Peruti has won sponsorships with leading gear manufacturers, and was featured as one of six guitarists in Fender's American Professional Series campaign, alongside legends like Charlie Bereal and Duff Mckagan.

Gothic Tropic's new music attracted attention from Beats 1's Zane Lowe, KROQ's Kat Corbett, to Australia's Triple J, as well as having been added to many major front page Spotify and Apple Music playlists. After having supported Kate Nash on her recent UK tour, as well as packing out her first UK and EU headline tour and festival circuit, Gothic Tropic is bound for "slick, full arenas."

Gothic Tropic has since released a collaboration with Allie X, "Give Me the Love". Featured as the opening track on Tang Brain, the song was released alongside the EP on July 9, 2021.

Gothic Tropic joined Allie X to play guitar for the Girl with No Face Tour through May and June 2024, hitting locations such as Dublin, London, Manchester, Toronto, New York, and LA.

=== Awesome Problems EP (2011 - 2017) ===
‘Awesome Problems’ marks the debut of Della Peruti releasing her solo material under her stage name, Gothic Tropic. The EP was recorded live with drummer Liv Marsico, bassist Daniel Denton, and guitarist Samuel Lopez Jr. and was mixed by Mark Rains at Station House Studio.

=== Fast or Feast Album (2017 - Present) ===
Recorded in Echo Park in spring of 2016 with Todd Dahlhoff, the debut psych-pop record ‘Fast or Feast’ is the result of a two-year period writing on the road while playing for Børns. It was officially released on May 19, 2017 via Australian record label Old Flame. Denton returns to the record and is joined by drummer Matthew Compton.

Gothic Tropic released the EP 'Tang Brain' July 9, 2021.

Della Peruti released the LP Bloodthirsty on March 1, 2025 followed by a secondary full length album The Things I Buried Alive later that month, in part funded by a Gofundme campaign.

== Discography ==
=== Studio albums ===
- Fast or Feast (Old Flame Records, 2017)
- Bloodthirsty (Mass Elation Records, 2025)
- The Things I Buried Alive (Mass Elation Records, 2025)

=== EPs ===
- Awesome Problems EP (Self Released, 2011)
- Tang Brain (Dome Of Doom, 2021)
- Eternally Grateful (Mass Elation Records, 2024)

=== Singles ===
- Underwater Games (non-album single, 2014)
- Bird of Prey (non-album single, 2014)
- Puppet Master (non-album single, 2015)
