= Component System with the Auto Reverse =

2022 studio album by Open Mike Eagle

Studio album by Open Mike Eagle
- Released: October 7, 2022
- Genre: Hip-hop
- Length: 38:07
- Label: Auto Reverse Records

Open Mike Eagle chronology
Anime, Trauma and Divorce (2020)	Component System with the Auto Reverse (2022)	Another Triumph of Ghetto Engineering (2023)

Singles from Component System with the Auto Reverse
- 1. "Burner Account" Released: September 15, 2021; 2. "Multi-Game Arcade Cabinet" Released: March 25, 2022; 3. "I'll Fight You" Released: August 9, 2022; 4. "Circuit City" Released: October 4, 2022

Component System with the Auto Reverse (sometimes listed under the title A Tape Called Component System with the Auto Reverse) is the eighth studio album by rapper Open Mike Eagle. It was preceded by four singles: "Burner Account", "Multi-Game Arcade Cabinet", "I'll Fight You" and "Circuit City". The album has been regarded as "easily one of Open Mike Eagle's most enjoyable efforts" and as "feel[ing] like the culmination" to his discography.

== Background ==
Component System with the Auto Reverse was named in reference to the shelf stereo system, a machine that was popular in the late twentieth century for allowing radio listeners to compile and record mixtapes. During his adolescence in the 1990s, Eagle made numerous mixtapes out of music he heard on college radio stations in his native Chicago. He consequently chose the name and aesthetic of this album as an allusion to one such mixtape. The 1990s also inspired the visual direction of the album, which references touchstones of the era such as VHS tapes and the retailer Circuit City.

Eagle has stated that his writing process on Component System with the Auto Reverse placed a greater focus on technique than his previous albums had, and that he was deliberately seeking to "break creative thresholds" in a way he had not previously attempted. He recounts the COVID-19 lockdowns of 2020 as being a psychologically challenging experience that shaped his mindset during the album's development; Eagle also credits his collaborations with Video Dave and Still Rift for keeping him motivated through the stresses of the lockdown.

== Critical reception ==
Professional ratings
Aggregate scores
Source	Rating
Metacritic	83/100
Review scores
Source	Rating
AllMusic	4/5 stars
Beats Per Minute	82/100
HipHopDX	4/5
Pitchfork	7.8/10

At Metacritic, which assigns a weighted average score out of 100 to reviews from mainstream critics, Component System with the Auto Reverse received an average score of 83 based on 5 reviews, indicating "universal acclaim".

Component System was widely characterized by critics as featuring a looser structure and a more whimsical mood than Eagle's previous albums. Paul Simpson of AllMusic describes Eagle's lyrics as "raw, off the cuff, and unfiltered", while Tim Sentz of Beats Per Minute describes the album as "tender, chaotic, and messy". Matthew Ismael Ruiz of Pitchfork regarded the album's aesthetic as "raw but carefully considered". Eagle received particular praise for his ability to pivot between humorous and introspective content on the album, with a mixture of "bittersweet" and "cartoonish" humor that also pivoted into forthright and thoughtful discussions of topics such as "aging, mental illness, disappointment, and hope". Eagle's technical skill on the album was also viewed positively: critics described him as writing "tightly packed nerd raps" that were "filled with casually brilliant moments". The Glide review remarked that Eagle seemed to be more confident in his rapping skill than on previous releases. In a more mixed review, Ben Brutocao of HipHopDX argued that—although the first half of the album sported "some of the most sure-footed rapping" in Eagle's discography—the project's second half failed to reach the same level.

Sonically, the album was described as featuring "sample-rich production with... nostalgic low-end", and as displaying lo-fi and boom bap influences.

== Track listing ==
No.	Title	Writer(s)	Producer(s)	Length
1.	"The Song With the Secret Name"	Michael W. Eagle II	Child Actor	2:15
2.	"TDK Scribbled Intro"	Eagle	Kuest1	0:45
3.	"79th and Stony Island"	Eagle	Quelle Chris	4:04
4.	"I'll Fight You"	Eagle; Joseph Kirkland	Diamond D	2:45
5.	"Circuit City" (with Video Dave and Still Rift)	Eagle; Video Dave; Still Rift	Madlib	3:06
6.	"I Retired Then I Changed My Mind"	Eagle	Child Actor	2:35
7.	"Burner Account" (with Armand Hammer)	Eagle; Billy Woods; Chaz Hall; Quelle Chris	Quelle Chris	3:25
8.	"For DOOM"	Eagle	Illingsworth	2:04
9.	"Crenshaw and Homeland"	Eagle	Diamond D	3:38
10.	"Multi-Game Arcade Cabinet" (with Video Dave, Still Rift, and R.A.P. Ferreira)	Eagle; Video Dave; Still Rift; Rory Ferreira	Illingsworth	3:07
11.	"Credits Interlude" (with Serengeti)	Eagle; David Cohn	Illingsworth	0:43
12.	"Peak Lockdown Raps"	Eagle	Child Actor	3:32
13.	"Kites" (with Video Dave and Still Rift)	Eagle; Video Dave; Still Rift	Kuest1	2:32
14.	"CD Only Bonus Track" (with Aesop Rock and Diamond D)	Eagle; Ian Bavitz; Kirkland	Diamond D	3:36
Total length:				38:07

== Personnel ==
- Kenny Segal – mixing engineer (1–6, 8–14)
- Jake Bowman – mixing engineer (7)
- Daddy Kev – mastering engineer
