= Dark Comedy (album) =

Studio album by Open Mike Eagle
- Released: June 10, 2014
- Genre: Hip-hop
- Length: 44:39
- Label: Mello Music Group
- Producers: Toy Light, Taco Neck, Illingsworth, Cohen Beats, Ultra Combo, Alpha MC, Dibiase, Kenny Segal, Jeremiah Jae, Busdriver, Elos

Open Mike Eagle chronology
4nml Hsptl (2012)	Dark Comedy (2014)	Hella Personal Film Festival (2016)

Dark Comedy is a studio album by American hip-hop artist Open Mike Eagle. It was released via Mello Music Group on June 10, 2014. It includes guest appearances from Kool A.D. and Hannibal Buress. Music videos were created for "Qualifiers", "A History of Modern Dance", "Doug Stamper (Advice Raps)", "Dark Comedy Morning Show", and "Informations".

== Critical reception ==
Professional ratings
Aggregate scores
Source	Rating
Metacritic	73/100
Review scores
Source	Rating
Clash	7/10
DIY	3/5 stars
HipHopDX	4.0/5
The Independent	4/5 stars
Pitchfork	8.0/10
Potholes in My Blog	3/5 stars
Robert Christgau	(2-star Honorable Mention)

At Metacritic, which assigns a weighted average score out of 100 to reviews from mainstream critics, the album received an average score of 73, based on 7 reviews, indicating "generally favorable reviews".

Jessica Rew of HipHopDX gave the album a 4.0 out of 5, saying, "Even with its melancholy closing, Dark Comedy is an incredibly fulfilling listen." Nate Patrin of Pitchfork gave the album an 8.0 out of 10, saying, "Whether it's through casual observation or the to-the-bone identity struggles, Open Mike Eagle's overlap between amusing insights and uncomfortable truths makes for one of the most compelling indie-rap listens of the year so far."

=== Accolades ===
Publication	Accolade	Rank	Ref.
Rolling Stone	40 Best Rap Albums of 2014	38	
Spin	40 Best Hip-Hop Albums of 2014	34	

== Track listing ==
No.	Title	Producer(s)	Length
1.	"Dark Comedy Morning Show" (featuring Toy Light)	Toy Light	3:23
2.	"Qualifiers"	Taco Neck	3:31
3.	"Thirsty Ego Raps"	Illingsworth	3:50
4.	"Golden Age Raps"	Cohen Beats	2:53
5.	"Very Much Money (Ice King Dream)"	Ultra Combo	3:34
6.	"Doug Stamper (Advice Raps)" (featuring Hannibal Buress)	Alpha MC	4:48
7.	"Jon Lovitz (Fantasy Booking Yarn)"	Dibiase	2:22
8.	"Idaho"	Kenny Segal	3:56
9.	"Sadface Penance Raps"	Alpha MC	1:26
10.	"A History of Modern Dance"	Jeremiah Jae	3:41
11.	"Deathmate Black"	Busdriver	4:09
12.	"Informations" (featuring Kool A.D.)	Elos	3:45
13.	"Big Pretty Bridges (3 Days Off in Albuquerque)"	Toy Light	3:15
