= Dumbfoundead =

Argentinian-born American rapper (born 1986)

- 박성만
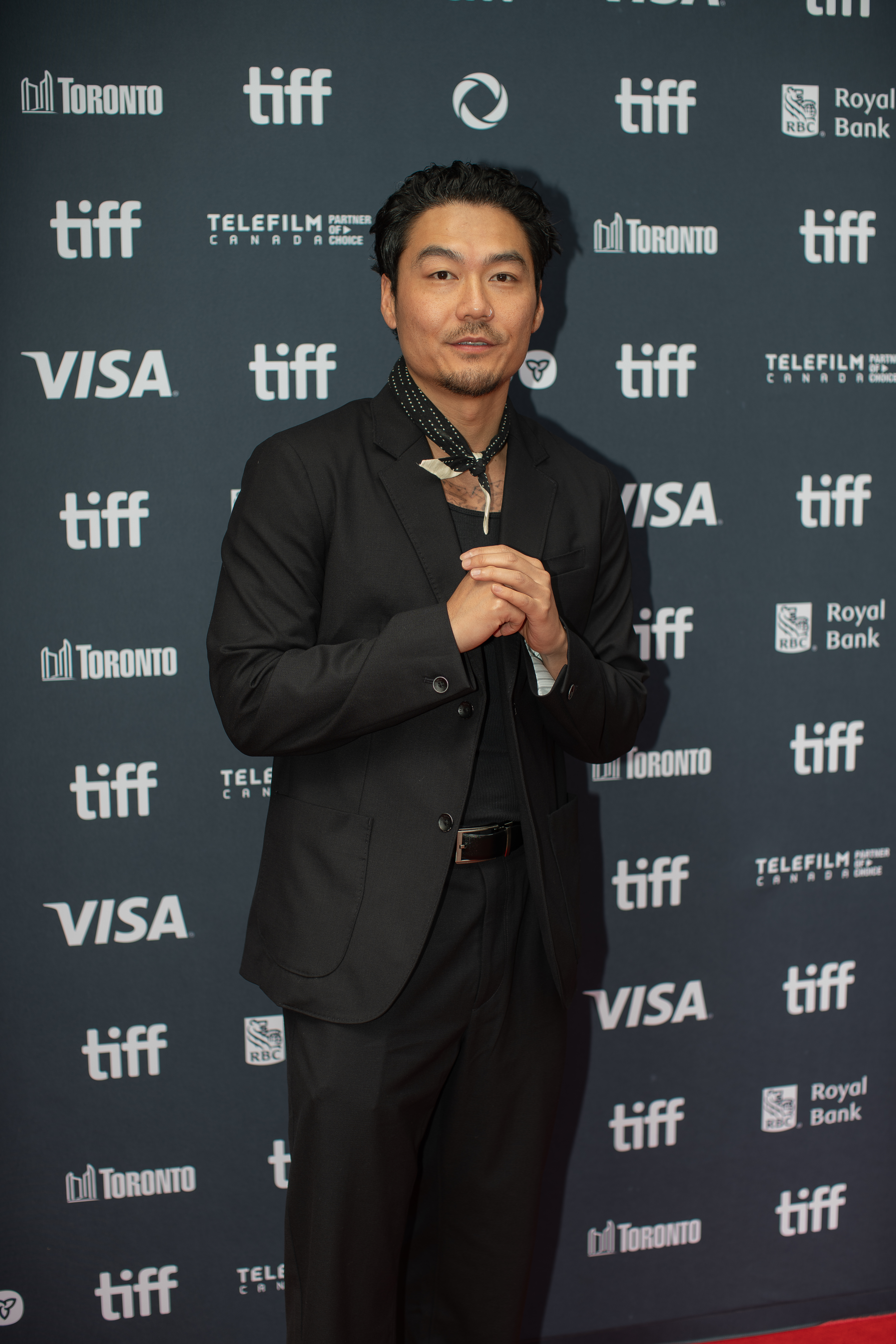
- Park at the 2024 Toronto International Film Festival
- Born: Jonathan Edgar Park; 18 February 1986 (age 40); Buenos Aires, Argentina
- Other names: DFD; Dumb; Parker
- Citizenship: Argentina; United States
- Occupations: Rapper; songwriter; actor
- Years active: 2006–present
- Musical career
- Origin: Los Angeles, California, U. S.
- Genre: Hip hop
- Instrument: Vocals
- Labels: 88rising; BORN CTZN
- Member of: Thirsty Fish

Korean name
- Hangul: 박성만
- RR: Bak Seongman
- MR: Pak Sŏngman
- Website: dumbfoundead.com

Jonathan Edgar Park (Korean: 박성만; born February 18, 1986), known professionally as Dumbfoundead (/ˈdʌmˌfaʊndɪd/), is an Argentinian-born American rapper and actor. He began his career in the 2000s as a battle rapper in Los Angeles and has since become one of the most prominent East Asian American rappers, known for his witty and socially conscious lyrics.

== Early life ==
Park was born in Buenos Aires, Argentina, to South Korean immigrants. He has one younger sister. When he was three years old, Park's family immigrated to the United States by crossing the Mexico–United States border without green cards. His family settled in the Koreatown neighborhood of Los Angeles, California.

Park began rapping when he was fourteen years old, inspired in part by the rappers he saw perform weekly at Project Blowed, a local open-microphone workshop. He dropped out of John Marshall High School in his sophomore year and moved into a one-bedroom apartment with his sister and a roommate at the age of sixteen. Before becoming a full-time rapper, he worked as a bail bondsman, among other odd jobs.

Park became a U.S. citizen when he was nineteen years old.

== Career ==
Park's first solo album, DFD, was released in 2011. His second album, Take the Stares, was released in 2012. In 2013, Park released his third album, Old Boy Jon, which was produced entirely by Duke Westlake.

Park was a member of Thirsty Fish along with Open Mike Eagle and Psychosiz. He has also collaborated with Epik High, Traphik, Wax, Jay Park, Kahi, Jessi, GSoul, MC Jin, Year of the Ox, Rekstizzy, and Anderson .Paak. In 2015, he was featured on the remix of Keith Ape's "It G Ma", alongside Waka Flocka Flame, ASAP Ferg, and Father.

Park began growing a web fan-base after video clips of his rap battles were posted to YouTube. In 2015, Park announced his return to battle rap, participating in Drake and OVO's event King of the Dot Blackout 5, with Drake expressing his excitement at Park's return. Park competed against Wild 'n Out cast member Conceited, and the battle was the most popular English rap battle of 2015.

He has been featured on NBC for his viral video Jam Session 2.0, consisting of eight different musicians from around the world sharing the spotlight individually via split screen but collaborating on one cohesive track. He has also been featured by Los Angeles Times, Last Call with Carson Daly, MTV Hive, and Mnet.

Park played a supporting role in Joseph Kahn's horror film Detention and would later appear in Kahn's 2017 film Bodied as battle-rapper Prospek.

In 2016, he released the music video "Safe," which gained widespread attention for superimposing Park's likeness onto the faces of white actors in famous movie scenes. The objective of this was to call attention to the fact that there were no East Asian or East Asian American actors at the Oscars, and that "the only yellow men were all statues." Furthermore, the music video was another call to "the obvious underrepresentation of people of color in Hollywood." Park was also a starring member of the 2016 documentary Bad Rap, which outlined the lives of four East Asian American musicians trying to make it in the hip-hop scene. He also played Dylan Shin in the Starz drama Power. In 2017, he co-wrote "Spirit Animal" and "Arrived" alongside Jessi for her debut EP Un2verse.

Since 2018, Park has hosted the Fun With Dumb podcast.

In April 2020, Peacock began development on a half-hour comedy television series based on Park's life entitled Big Dummie.

Park's talk show with Sasha Grey, Grey Area, debuted on the online television network VENN on August 5, 2020.

Park is also the co‑host of the podcast Baby Goat, launched in April 2025 with Andrea Jin, where the duo explore contemporary culture and personal anecdotes.

During the coronavirus pandemic, Park promoted support for restaurant workers affected by COVID-19.

== Discography ==
=== Studio albums ===
Title	Details	Peak chart positions	
Title	Details	US R&B/ Hip-Hop	US Rap
DFD	Released: November 1, 2011; Label: Transparent Agency; Formats: CD, digital download	41	24
Take the Stares	Released: October 16, 2012; Label: Transparent Agency; Formats: CD, digital download	56	—
Old Boy Jon	Released: February 18, 2013; Label: Transparent Agency; Formats: CD, digital download	—	—
We Might Die	Released: November 10, 2016; Label: Transparent Agency; Formats: CD, digital download	—	—

=== Extended plays ===
Title	Details	Peak chart positions
Title	Details	KOR
Fun with Dumb	Release: May 12, 2008; Label: Swim Team Records; Formats: CD, digital download	—
Foreigner	Released: May 23, 2017; Label: Born CTZN; Formats: CD, digital download	87
Rocket Man	Released: December 13, 2017; Label: Born CTZN; Formats: CD, digital download	—
Café Bleu	Released: November 2, 2018; Label: Born CTZN; Formats: CD, digital download	—

=== Singles ===
Title	Year	Peak chart positions	Sales	Album
Title	Year	KOR	Sales	Album
As lead artist
"Different Galaxies" (featuring Sam Ock)	2010	—	—N/a	Non-album singles
"Clouds" (featuring Jay Park and Clara)	2010	—	—N/a	Non-album singles
"Respect 16's" (featuring Dok2, Myk, Yankie, Rakaa, Mithra Jin, Tablo, Bizzy, Sean Rhee, and Tiger JK)	2010	—	—N/a	Non-album singles
"Mellow Yellow"	2015	—	—N/a	Non-album singles
"Coachella"	2015	—	—N/a	Non-album singles
"Domies" (도우미) (featuring Keith Ape and Okasian)	2015	—	—N/a	Non-album singles
"Mijangwon" (미장원) (featuring Loopy and Nafla)	2015	—	—N/a	Non-album singles
"Safe"	2016	—	—N/a	We Might Die
"Hyung" (형) (featuring Dok2, Simon Dominic, and Tiger JK)	2017	—	—N/a	Foreigner
"3890"	2017	—	—N/a	Non-album single
"Every Last Drop"	2017	—	—N/a	Rocket Man
"P.A.A.C. (Protect at All Cost)"	2017	—	—N/a	Rocket Man
"Kill Me"	2017	—	—N/a	Rocket Man
Collaborations
"100 Grand" (with Keith Charles Spacebar)	2015	—	—N/a	Non-album singles
"Banned From The Motherland" (with Josh Pan featuring Jay Park, Simon Dominic, and G2)	2016	—	—N/a	Non-album singles
"K.B.B" (가위바위보) (with Jessi, Microdot, and Lyricks)	2016	—	—N/a	Non-album singles
"Inside" (with SATICA)	2020	—	—N/a	Inside/Outside
"Outside" (with SATICA)	2020	—	—N/a	Inside/Outside
As featured artist
"White Boy Wasted" (Your Favorite Martian featuring Dumbfoundead)	2012	—	—N/a	Non-album single
"It's Me" (Kahi featuring Dumbfoundead)	2013	45	KOR: 123,562+	Who Are You?
"Exquisite Corpse" (Watsky featuring Dumbfoundead, Grieves, Adam Vida, Wax, Rafael Casal, Daveed Diggs, & Chinaka Hodge)	2016	—	—N/a	x Infinity
"Please" (DPR Live featuring Dumbfoundead, Kim Hyo-eun, and G2)	2017	—	—N/a	Coming to You Live
"—" denotes releases that did not chart.

== Filmography ==
=== Film ===
- Detention (2011), Toshiba
- Bad Rap (2016), himself
- Bodied (2017), Prospek
- Raya and the Last Dragon (2021), Chai (voice)
- Mid-Century (2022), Sgt. Choe
- Quiz Lady (2023), Ken
- Drugstore June (2024), JD
- Sweet Dreams (2024), Dip
- K-Pops! (2024), Cash
- Tuner (2025), Sung
- If I Go Will They Miss Me (2026), Kim

=== Television series ===
- Power (2016), Dylan
- Adventure Time (2017), Son of Rap Bear (voice)
- The Mick (2018), Sneaker Store Employee
- Awkwafina Is Nora from Queens (2020–2023), Doug
- Nemesis (2026), Chris Choi
