= Mush Records =

American independent record label

- Founded: 1997
- Founder: Robert Curcio, Cindy Roché
- Genre: Electronic, hip-hop
- Country of origin: U.S.
- Location: Los Angeles, California
- Official website: www.mushrecords.com

Mush Records is an American independent record label. It was founded by Robert Curcio and Cindy Roché in 1997.

== History ==
Originally known as Dirty Loop Music, Mush Records started out as a recording studio in Cincinnati, Ohio, with the label formed as an outlet to release music that was being made in the studio. Since then, Mush Records has been located in San Francisco, Chicago, and New York, and has now settled in Los Angeles. Primarily an electronic music label, Mush Records puts out a wide range of music within the genre, including "electronic instrumental, underground hip-hop, downtempo, abstract hip-hop, experimental, indie rock, jazz-based grooves, turntablist compositions, electronic pop, and saturated folk." The label operates an online store to facilitate direct sales of Mush Records releases and merchandise.

Mush Records' first release was Boom Bip & DJ Osiris' Low End Sequence EP in 1998, with the first album release Boom Bip & Dose One's Circle in 2000. This was followed the same year by the Ropeladder 12 compilation, featuring contributions from many artists from the Anticon roster.

In 2003, Mush Records sponsored a tour which included its roster artists Busdriver, Radioinactive, Daedelus, Awol One, AntiMC and others.

== See also ==
- List of record labels
