= Lee Tesche =

American musician, filmmaker and sound artist

- Origin: Atlanta, Georgia, U.S.
- Genres: Post-punk; Experimental rock; Punk rock
- Occupations: Musician; multi-instrumentalist; filmmaker; graphic designer; sound artist
- Instruments: Guitar; bass guitar; percussion; synthesizer; saxophone
- Years active: 2000s–present
- Member of: Algiers; Lyonnais; Nun Gun; Dead Pioneers

Lee Tesche is an American musician, multi-instrumentalist, filmmaker, curator and sound artist from Atlanta, Georgia. He is best known as a founding member and guitarist of the post-punk band Algiers, and has also been a member of Lyonnais, Nun Gun, and Dead Pioneers.

Tesche has also worked as a video director, graphic designer and sound artist. He curated the Atlanta installment of Burn to Shine, the documentary film series created by filmmaker Christoph Green and Fugazi drummer Brendan Canty, and has directed or co-directed music videos for Algiers, Lyonnais and Dead Pioneers. Through Nun Gun, he collaborated with Mark Stewart of The Pop Group.

== Career ==
=== Algiers ===
Tesche is a founding member of Algiers, an Atlanta-rooted post-punk band whose music has been described as combining gospel, punk, post-punk, industrial music and political critique. According to AllMusic, the band formed in Atlanta when guitarist Tesche and bassist Ryan Mahan, both active in the city's underground rock and noise scenes, began working with vocalist and guitarist Franklin James Fisher. Interview described Algiers as having started as a three-piece in Atlanta before expanding across multiple cities, with Tesche remaining in Atlanta while other members were based in London and New York.

Algiers released its self-titled debut album through Matador Records in 2015. Reviewing the album for Pitchfork, Stuart Berman noted that Fisher, Tesche and Mahan assembled the record through transatlantic collaboration, with Tesche and Mahan then based in London. Coverage of the band has noted Tesche's role as guitarist and multi-instrumentalist, with AllMusic listing his credits across Algiers releases as including guitar, prepared guitar, prepared piano, percussion, synthesizer, saxophone, electronics, programming, vocals, photography and design.

In 2020, Tesche appeared with Algiers vocalist Franklin James Fisher on World Cafe to discuss the band's album There Is No Year. WNYC's Soundcheck has described Algiers' instrumentation as including Tesche on guitar, prepared guitar, harmonium, saxophone and prepared piano.

=== Lyonnais and Nun Gun ===
Tesche has also been a member of Lyonnais, an Atlanta experimental rock and post-punk group. AllMusic lists Tesche among Lyonnais' group members, alongside Farbod Kokabi, Farzad Moghaddam and TJ Blake. In 2016, Immersive Atlanta described Tesche as Lyonnais' guitarist and noted that his work with Algiers had brought him international attention.

Lyonnais released Want for Wish for Nowhere in 2011 and Anatomy of the Image in 2016. The video for Lyonnais' "A Sign From On High / Modern Calvary" was directed by Tesche and Sam Campbell.

Tesche and Algiers bandmate Ryan Mahan formed Nun Gun with visual artist Brad Feuerhelm. The project released Mondo Decay, a multimedia work pairing Feuerhelm's photography with an original soundtrack, in 2021.

Through Nun Gun, Tesche collaborated with Mark Stewart of The Pop Group. Stereogum described Nun Gun as a collaborative project between Tesche, Mahan and Feuerhelm, and noted that the track "Stealth Empire" featured vocals from Stewart. The Quietus also described the release as a video collaboration with Stewart, connected to Nun Gun's Mondo Decay project.

=== Dead Pioneers ===
Tesche is the bassist for Dead Pioneers, a Denver punk band led by visual and performance artist Gregg Deal. Deal told PopMatters that he met Tesche during an artist residency in Florida, where the two worked on the first iteration of the Dead Pioneers song "Bad Indian". The collaboration later developed into a larger set of songs and recording sessions for the band.

Dead Pioneers released their self-titled debut album in 2023, with Tesche on bass. It was followed by Po$t American in 2025 and Wagon Burner in 2026.

Tesche has also directed music videos for the band, including "Mythical Cowboys", "Never Alone" featuring The Interrupters, and "The Worst Among Us" featuring Jason Williamson of Sleaford Mods.

=== Film and video ===
Tesche has worked as a filmmaker, video director, curator and visual collaborator. The Atlantic Center for the Arts described him as a multi-instrumentalist, sound designer and filmmaker whose work includes experimental tape-based music and contributions to television and film. In 2015, The Line of Best Fit reported that Tesche directed the video for Algiers' "Black Eunuch".

Tesche curated the Atlanta installment of Burn to Shine, the documentary film series created by filmmaker Christoph Green and Fugazi drummer Brendan Canty. Burn to Shine 6: Atlanta was filmed in 2007 and featured performances by artists including Shannon Wright, Deerhunter, Black Lips, Mastodon, The Coathangers, The Mighty Hannibal, and others. In a 2009 interview with Creative Loafing, Canty credited Tesche's local organizing role in making the Atlanta installment happen.

Tesche also collaborated with writer and artist Michael Salu on Losing is Ours, a film project described by Salu as a contemporary response to Dante. Tesche is credited as co-director and producer, and also contributed cinematography and the score.

=== Sound art and Aural Field Survey ===
In 2024, Tesche created the sound for visual artist Gui Marcondes' exhibition I know I exist because you imagine me, presented at the Museu da Imagem e do Som de São Paulo as part of its Nova Fotografia program.

In 2025, Tesche contributed to the sound for Japanese flower artist Azuma Makoto's exhibition X-Ray FLOWERS at the Kyoto Shimbun Building in Kyoto. The exhibition featured X-ray and CT-scan imagery of flowers and plants, with music created by Algiers specifically for the installation.

In 2026, Tesche and designer Staci Janik were selected as artists-in-residence for the Soundscape Field Station, a partnership between the Atlantic Center for the Arts and Canaveral National Seashore.

Their resulting project, Aural Field Survey, is a site-responsive sound and design work built from field recordings, photography, moving images, radio transmission, recorded memory and original music gathered across Canaveral National Seashore and the surrounding New Smyrna Beach landscape.

The installation used multiple independent playback systems operating on separate timelines so that field recordings, processed sound, music, radio transmissions and spoken material recombined differently over time. Atlantic Center for the Arts presented an artist talk and performance connected to the project in October 2026.

== Selected works ==
=== Discography ===
==== With Algiers ====
- Algiers (2015, Matador Records)
- The Underside of Power (2017, Matador Records)
- There Is No Year (2020, Matador Records)
- Shook (2023, Matador Records)

==== With Lyonnais ====
- Want for Wish for Nowhere (2011)
- Anatomy of the Image (2016)

==== With Nun Gun ====
- Mondo Decay (2021)
- Stealth Empire (In Dub) (2021)

==== With Dead Pioneers ====
- Po$t American (2025, Hassle Records)
- Wagon Burner (2026, Hassle Records)

=== Selected videography ===
Year	Title	Artist / project	Credit
2012	"A Sign From On High / Modern Calvary"	Lyonnais	Director, with Sam Campbell
2012	"Blood"	Algiers	Director
2015	"Irony. Utility. Pretext."	Algiers	Director
2015	"Black Eunuch"	Algiers	Director
2016	Burn to Shine 6: Atlanta	Burn to Shine	Curator
2023	"Irreversible Damage"	Algiers	Director
2023	"I Can't Stand It!"	Algiers	Director
2025	"Mythical Cowboys"	Dead Pioneers	Director
2026	"Never Alone"	Dead Pioneers featuring The Interrupters	Director
2026	"The Worst Among Us"	Dead Pioneers featuring Jason Williamson	Director
