= Algiers (band) =

American post-punk band

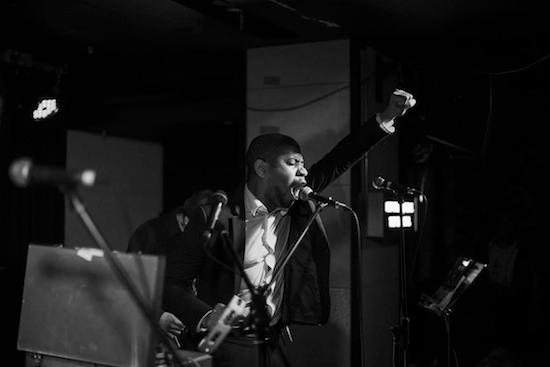
- Franklin James Fisher performing with Algiers in London in 2015

Background information
- Origin: London, England
- Genres: Post-punk; experimental rock; soul; hip-hop; industrial
- Years active: 2012–present
- Label: Matador
- Spinoffs: Dead Pioneers; Nun Gun; Lyonnais
- Spinoff of: Bloc Party
- Members: Franklin James Fisher; Ryan Mahan; Lee Tesche; Matt Tong
- Website: algierstheband.com

Algiers is an American post-punk band from London, England, formed in 2012. The band consists of multi-instrumentalists Franklin James Fisher, Ryan Mahan, Lee Tesche, and Matt Tong. Algiers pulls from a divergent number of musical (and nonmusical) influences; the most notable of these influences are post-punk, hip-hop, Southern Gothic literature, and the concept of the Other. Their sound has been described as dystopian soul due to its somber mood, afrofolk inspired vocal approach, and heavy emphasis on atonal textures.

== History ==
Fisher, Mahan, and Tesche (of the experimental band Lyonnais) met and grew up playing music together in Atlanta, Georgia, but officially formed in London in 2012 with the release of their first single. They chose the name Algiers in reference to Gillo Pontecorvo's 1966 film, The Battle of Algiers, and a key historical site of anti-colonial struggle, symbolizing a contested space where violence, racism, resistance, and religion commingle.

Their live show has been described as "recalling at various points PIL's dub-style expansions, Afrobeat, industrial, no wave, free jazz, Suicide, the XTC of "Travels in Nihilon," Nick Cave's fire and brimstone, and musique concrète."

=== 2012–2016: Formation and debut album ===
The group released their first single "Blood" in January 2012 via Atlanta based label Double Phantom. Byron Coley for The Wire wrote: "Although the fusion may have been touched upon in recordings related to both The Birthday Party and The Gun Club, Algiers are dedicated to grafting gospel music onto post-punk guitar-scuzz...this record is mesmerising and really sucks you in with its weird power."

The band's self-titled debut album was released through Matador on June 2, 2015. Ahead of their eponymous release, the band opened for Interpol, during their North American Tour. Matt Tong, formerly of Bloc Party, began playing drums for Algiers at this time.

In the spring of the following year, the band premiered and toured the Eastern US screening the sixth installment of Brendan Canty of Fugazi and Christoph Green's Burn to Shine film series. Burn to Shine Atlanta was curated by Lee Tesche of Algiers and filmed in the summer of 2007. This was followed by a live installation with renowned Japanese flower artist Makoto Azuma that saw the band performing in the Californian desert underneath a palm tree suspended in mid air.

=== 2017–2021: The Underside of Power, There Is No Year and collaborations ===
On June 23, 2017, Algiers released their second studio album, The Underside of Power, to universal critical acclaim. The album was produced by Adrian Utley of Portishead and Ali Chant and mixed by Randall Dunn. This coincided with a European stadium tour that found the band opening up for Depeche Mode and remixing the lead single from their Spirit album. At the same time, it was revealed that Algiers had also been working in the studio with Massive Attack and were releasing an experimental tape and zine series. Much of 2018 saw the band on the road with Young Fathers, a DIY tour with Downtown Boys, and a special set at the Black Cat 25th anniversary party.

In the lead up to their next album, the band released the critically acclaimed, explosive, free jazz single, "Can the Sub_Bass Speak?" Their third full-length album for Matador, There Is No Year, followed on January 17, 2020. On February 1, the band made their network television debut performing "Dispossession" on The Late Show with Stephen Colbert.

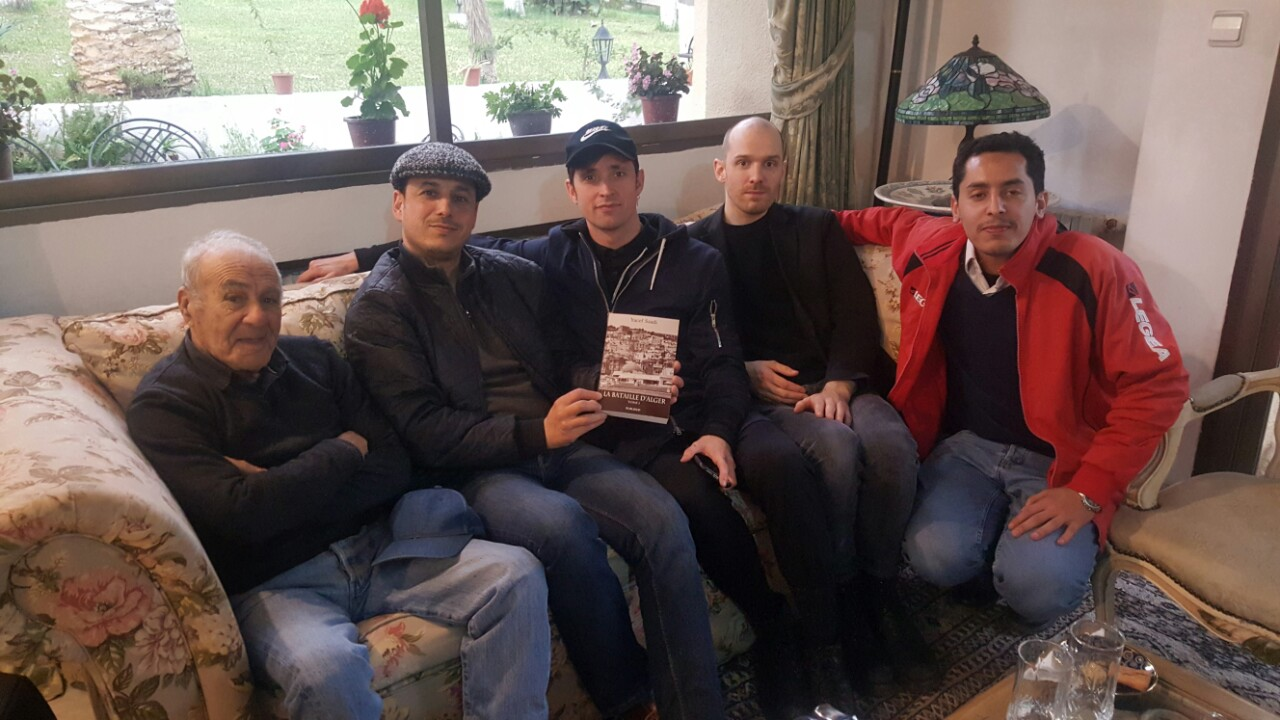
Saadi Yacef and Ryan Mahan

Post-release, members of the band traveled to Algeria for the first time and met with Algerian Independence fighter Saadi Yacef. His memoirs, Souvenirs de la Bataille d'Alger, served as the basis for Gillo Pontecorvo's film The Battle of Algiers, which Yacef helped produce, and was one of the inspirations for the band's name. This marked a frenzied period of activity and collaboration for the group beginning with their featured appearance on Massive Attack's Eutopia audiovisual EP alongside Christiana Figueres; the release of "Cleveland 20/20" a 50-minute expansion and re-imagining of their song "Cleveland" in the wake of the George Floyd protests; Fisher's guest feature on Billy Woods and Moor Mother's BRASS album; Mahan's first solo outing as Dead Meat; as well as Tesche and Mahan releasing two albums as the award-winning multimedia collaboration, Nun Gun, with visual artist Brad Feuerhelm. Nun Gun's debut release, Mondo Decay, pairs a book of Feuerhelm's photography with an accompanying original soundtrack cassette that features guest contributions from Mark Stewart of The Pop Group, Adrian Sherwood, ONO, Mourning [A] BLKstar, artists Luiza Prado and Farbod Kokabi, as well as authors Blake Butler, Michael Salu, and Sohail Daulatzai. Nun Gun released the Mark Stewart focused LP, Stealth Empire (In Dub), in April 2021. This would be one of the last recordings of Mark Stewart before his death.

=== 2022–present: Shook vs Shook World ===
On September 13, 2022, Algiers released the single "Bite Back" featuring the rappers Billy Woods and Backxwash, their first new music in over two years. They quickly followed it up with the blistering single, "Irreversible Damage", which featured a rare verse from Rage Against the Machine's Zack de la Rocha, his only recorded appearance outside of Run the Jewels in over a decade. It was announced that their fourth album, Shook, would be released the following February.

In January 2023, King Vision Ultra released the unannounced Algiers-hosted mixtape, Shook World, which melds together samples from Algiers's Shook album with snippets from a personal archive of cassettes originally sourced from outlets like Kim's Video and Music and mixtape purveyors Tape Kingz back in the '90s, plus personal phone field recordings and voice memos. The companion album featured guests include Elucid (Billy Woods' partner from Armand Hammer), Company Flow's Bigg Jus, Dreamcrusher, LaTasha N. Nevada Diggs, Matana Roberts, Nakama., Desde, Rena Anakwe, Marcus, Lord Kayso, Harlem Boog, DJ Haram, Dis Fig, maassai, amani, No Land, with additional field recordings courtesy of Taja Cheek (L'Rain) and Ara Kim, with Franklin James Fisher of Algiers hosting. Several weeks prior, King Vision Ultra and Algiers previewed the two albums by playing them live as part of a sound clash at Brooklyn's National Sawdust, billed as "Shook vs Shook World". The all-star lineup of special guests included amani, Big Rube, Billy Woods, DeForrest Brown Jr., Desde, Dreamcrusher, Elucid, Fatboi Sharif, King Vision Ultra, Latoya Kent, maassai, Mark Cisneros, and Patrick Shiroishi.

On February 24, 2023, Algiers released their fourth studio album, Shook. It was preceded by the single "I Can’t Stand It!" featuring Samuel T. Herring from Future Islands and Jae Matthews from Boy Harsher. Dante Foley began playing drums on a second drum set for Algiers live sets during this time.

Tesche formed the band Dead Pioneers with artist and activist Gregg Deal during this period, after meeting at an artists residency at Atlantic Center for the Arts. They released their first album in 2023.

== Members ==
- Franklin James Fisher – vocals, guitars, piano, cello, percussion, sampler, synthesizers
- Ryan Mahan – bass guitar, synthesizers, piano, percussion, drum programming, backing vocals
- Lee Tesche – guitar, percussion, saxophone, synthesizers, backing vocals
- Matt Tong – drums, percussion, backing vocals

== Discography ==
=== Albums ===
List of albums, with selected chart positions
Title	Album details	Peak chart positions				
Title	Album details	US Heat	UK	UK Indie	GER	SWI
Algiers	Released: June 2, 2015; Label: Matador	14	—	—	—	—
The Underside of Power	Released: June 23, 2017; Label: Matador	16	—	24	—	69
There Is No Year	Released: January 17, 2020; Label: Matador	—	88	23	85	—
Shook	Released: February 24, 2023; Label: Matador	—	—	—	—	—
"—" denotes a recording that did not chart or was not released in that territory.

=== Mixtapes, EPs and Miscellaneous ===
Year	Title	Label	Notes	Source
2015	Mute Studio Sessions	Matador	Digital only release of stripped-down alternate versions of singles from their first album	
2017	September 2017	Algiers Recordings	Tour only cassette	
2018	1st November 1954	Algiers Recordings	Tour only cassette	
2023	Shook World (hosted by Algiers)	PTP	Mixtape by King Vision Ultra	

=== Singles ===
- "Blood" / "Black Eunuch" (2012, Double Phantom Records)
- "Walk Like A Panther / Walk Like A Panther (Uniform Remix)" (2017, Matador)
- "Blood" / "Black Eunuch" (2017, Geographic North)
- "Can The Sub_Bass Speak?" (2019, Matador)
- "Void" (2019, Adult Swim Singles Club).
- "Can the Sub_Bass Speak? b/w It All Comes Around Again" (2020)
- "Bite Back" (featuring Billy Woods and Backxwash) (2022, Matador)
- "Irreversible Damage" (featuring Zack de la Rocha) (2022, Matador)

=== Remixes ===
- Liars – "Black Eunuch (Liars Remix)" (2015, Matador)
- Uniform – "Walk Like A Panther (Uniform Remix)" (2017, Matador)
- Gaika – "Cleveland (Gaika Remix / Spectacular Empire Dub)" (2017, Matador)
- Depeche Mode – "Where's The Revolution (Algiers Remix)" & "Where's The Revolution (Algiers Click Farm Remix)" from Spirit (Remixes) (2017, Columbia)
- Prurient – "Death March (Prurient Remix)" (2017, Matador)
- Soviet Soviet – "Ghost (Algiers Remix)" from Ghost (EP) (2020, Copyu Records)
- Kaufmann Frust – "Armee mit tausend Köpfen (Algiers Remix)"
- Ganser – "Told You So (Algiers Remix)" from Look At The Sun

=== Music videos ===
List of music videos, showing year released and directors
Title	Year	Director(s)
"Blood"	2015	Lee Tesche
"Irony. Utility. Pretext."	2015	Lee Tesche & Sam Campbell
"Black Eunuch"	2015	Lee Tesche & Sam Campbell
"And When You Fall"	2015	Sam Campbell
"Walk Like a Panther"	2017	Sam Campbell
"The Underside of Power"	2017	Henry Busby & Marcus Tortorici
"Cleveland"	2017	Franklin Fisher
"Can the Sub_Bass Speak?"	2019	Sam Campbell
"Dispossession	2019	Sohail Daulatzai
"Void"	2019	Ian Cone
"We Can't Be Found"	2020	Ian Cone
"Dispossession" Stripped Down: Live In Conklin Metals"	2020	Ian Cone
"Liberation" OutKast Cover, Live in ConKlin Metals"	2020	Ian Cone
"Bite Back" (feat. Billy Woods and Backxwash)	2022	Murat Gökmen
"Irreversible Damage" (feat. Zack De La Rocha)	2022	Lee Tesche & Ian Cone
"I Can't Stand It!" (featuring Samuel T. Herring and Jae Matthews)	2023	Lee Tesche
"73%" (Visualizer)	2023	Franklin James Fisher
