= Shook (album) =

Studio album by Algiers
- Released: February 24, 2023
- Recorded: April 2021 – December 2021
- Studio: Atlantic Center for the Arts, Kawari Sound, Pirate Studios, Retro City Studios
- Length: 54:26
- Label: Matador
- Producer: Algiers

Algiers chronology
Shook World (hosted by Algiers) (2023)	Shook (2023)

Shook is the fourth studio album by American experimental band Algiers. It was released through Matador Records on February 24, 2023. The single "Irreversible Damage", featuring Zack de la Rocha, was released in October 2022.

== Production ==
"Something Wrong?" is about a traffic stop involving a Black driver. A sample from "Subway Theme", by Grand Wizzard Theodore, appears on "Everybody Shatter". Samuel T. Herring sings on "I Can’t Stand It!" Backxwash appears on "Bite Back". Several tracks are spoken word pieces.

== Critical reception ==
Professional ratings
Aggregate scores
Source	Rating
Metacritic	79/100
Review scores
Source	Rating
AllMusic	4.5/5 stars
The Daily Telegraph	4/5 stars
Mojo	4/5 stars
Pitchfork	7.7/10
Slant Magazine	3/5 stars

Shook was well received by music critics. At Metacritic, which assigns a normalized rating out of 100 to reviews from mainstream critics, the album received an average score of 79, based on 16 reviews, which indicates "favorable reviews".

Reviewing the album for AllMusic, Heather Phares described it as, "More of an experience than a set of songs, Shook's stunning, often harrowing journey of surviving and resisting is well worth taking." Jon Pareles at The New York Times wrote that, "Algiers lashes out at injustice, exults in its sonic mastery and insists on the life forces of solidarity and physical impact." At Pitchfork, Matthew Ismael Ruiz noted that, "the group sounds most natural at their darkest—the reverbed growl of guitars, the synths colored with dirt and grime... They benefit from Matt Tong's virtuosic drumming, which feels looser and more alive than any drum machine."

The Daily Telegraph writer Andrew Perry concluded that, "for uninitiates, Shook's sensory onslaught may resemble Public Enemy's Fear of a Black Planet, updated for the post-Trump era." Mojo's Stevie Chick determined that, "Shook's stories of struggle, pain and healing are painted in edgy electro, impassioned punk-soul, cloudbursts of jazz and rattlesnake trap pulses."

== Track listing ==
All tracks are written by Algiers.

Shook track listing
No.	Title	Length
1.	"Everybody Shatter" (featuring Big Rube)	4:46
2.	"Irreversible Damage" (featuring Zack de la Rocha)	4:42
3.	"73%"	2:37
4.	"Cleanse Your Guilt Here"	1:34
5.	"As It Resounds" (featuring Big Rube)	1:20
6.	"Bite Back" (featuring Billy Woods and Backxwash)	6:00
7.	"Out of Style Tragedy" (featuring Mark Cisneros)	3:12
8.	"Comment #2"	0:38
9.	"A Good Man"	2:17
10.	"I Can't Stand It!" (featuring Samuel T. Herring and Jae Matthews)	3:25
11.	"All You See Is"	1:06
12.	"Green Iris"	6:17
13.	"Born" (featuring LaToya Kent)	1:26
14.	"Cold World" (featuring Nadah El Shazly)	4:18
15.	"Something Wrong"	4:53
16.	"An Echophonic Soul" (featuring DeForrest Brown Jr. and Patrick Shiroishi)	2:32
17.	"Momentary" (featuring Lee Bains III)	3:23

== Personnel ==
=== Algiers ===
- Franklin J. Fisher – vocals (1–4, 6, 7, 9–12, 14, 15, 17), drum programming (1, 3, 4), mellotron (1, 9), guitar (1–4, 9, 10, 14), bass guitar (1–4, 10, 11), sampler (1, 3, 7, 11, 14, 17), tape player (1), synthesizers (2–5, 11, 12, 17), sequencing (2, 4, 10–12, 15), beat programming (2, 10–12, 15, 17), percussion (2), background vocals (5), vocal sequencing (5), B2 organ (7), sampling (10), cello (10), piano (10, 12), moog (10), string arrangement (10)
- Ryan Mahan – synthesizers (1–3, 6, 7, 9, 10, 12, 14, 15), bass guitar (1, 6, 9, 14, 15), sound design (1, 6, 14, 15), drum production (1, 2, 6, 9, 14), bell (1), vocals (1–3, 6, 9, 10, 14, 15, 17), drum programming (2, 6, 9, 14), guitar (3, 6, 9, 14), background vocals (5), piano (6, 14), noise machine (6, 14), vocal production (10, 14), field recordings (17)
- Lee Tesche – guitar (1, 10, 14, 15), 2x4 (1, 12), glass bottle (1), sheet metal (1), sampler (1, 15, 17), field recordings (1, 8, 12, 13, 15, 17), electronics (1, 2, 4, 7, 9, 12, 14–17), vocals (1, 6, 7, 9), radio (2, 16), springs (2, 9), background vocals (5), tenor sax (7, 15, 17), programming (7), bells (7), pedal steel (7), percussion (10), test equipment (14), dub siren (15), tape manipulation (15), synthesizers (16)
- Matthew Tong – drums (1, 2, 6, 7, 9, 10, 14, 15, 17)

=== Other personnel ===
- Big Rube – vocals (1, 5)
- Tristan Griffin – background vocals (1, 3, 9, 15)
- Ayse Hassan – background vocals (1)
- Mark Stewart – background vocals (1)
- Matthew Ricchini – drums (1, 3, 6, 14, 15, 17), synthesizers (1, 12), percussion (2), background vocals (5, 15), sequencing (12), beat programming (12)
- Zack de la Rocha – vocals (2)
- Monika Khot – background vocals (4)
- Billy Woods – vocals (6)
- Ashanti Mutinta – vocals (6)
- Mawa Keita – background vocals (6)
- Joe Bochniak – background vocals (6)
- Kyle Kidd – background vocals (6)
- James Longs – background vocals (6)
- LaToya Kent – background vocals (6), vocals (13)
- Mark Cisneros – double bass (7, 12), bass clarinet (7), flute (7), congas (7), tenor sax (1, 12)
- An Do – voice (8)
- Samuel T. Herring – vocals (10)
- Jae Matthews – vocals (10)
- Susan D. Mandel – cello (10)
- Brianne Lugo – viola (10)
- Alex Weill – violin (10)
- Gari Thomas – voice (11)
- Shea Curry – vocals (12)
- Robyn Fisher – background vocals (12)
- Sonya Belaya – prepared piano (12), electronics (12)
- Caleb Flood – electronics (12)
- Dave Dickie – synthesizers (13)
- Félix Blume – field recordings (13)
- Nadah El Shazly – vocals (14)
- DeForrest Brown Jr. – vocals (16)
- Patrick Shiroishi – alto sax (16)
- Lee Bains lll – vocals (17)
