= Mondo Decay =

Studio album by Nun Gun
- Released: February 19, 2021
- Genre: Experimental
- Length: 55:45
- Label: Witty Kiwi
- Producer: Lee Tesche

Nun Gun chronology
Mondo Decay (2021)	Stealth Empire (In Dub) (2021)

Mondo Decay is the debut release from Nun Gun, the multimedia collaboration between visual artist Brad Feuerhelm, and musicians Lee Tesche and Ryan Mahan of the band Algiers. After winning the 2021 Ear/Eye Award, Mondo Decay was released as a 144-page photo book of Feuerhelm's photography with an accompanying soundtrack cassette produced by Tesche and Mahan on February 19, 2021, by Witty Kiwi. Mondo Decay "turns the tourist gaze of mid-century Italian exploitation films onto post-industrial America, while scavenging the pulpiest bits of their soundtracks, giving them the chopped and screwed treatment, and festooning them with Tesche's brash sax flourishes." The album features guest contributions from Mark Stewart of The Pop Group, ONO, Mourning [A] BLKstar, artists Luiza Prado and Farbod Kokabi, as well as authors Blake Butler, Michael Salu, and Sohail Daulatzai.

== Track listing ==
All tracks are written by Nun Gun

No.	Title	Length
1.	"The Spectre" (featuring Michael Salu)	5:08
2.	"Stealth Empire" (featuring Mark Stewart)	4:15
3.	"Beef Diet"	3:21
4.	"Gold Mine" (featuring ONO)	5:38
5.	"More Viscous Than Dawn" (featuring Luiza Prado)	4:42
6.	"Excusable Homicide"	3:39
7.	"On Neurath's Boat" (featuring Farbod Kokabi w/ Mourning [A] BLKstar)	5:12
8.	"The Aesthetics of Hunger"	4:01
9.	"Under the Throne" (featuring Sohail Daulatzai)	2:28
10.	"Addio Zio Sam"	2:59
11.	"I Used to Wear a Face" (featuring Blake Butler)	3:29
12.	"America Addio"	10:47

== Personnel ==
Credits adapted from liner notes.

- Brad Feuerhelm – Photography, Drums on A1, A3, A4, A5
- Lee Tesche – Saxophone, Electric Guitar, Acoustic Guitar, Lap Steel, Bass, Percussion and Motors, Bowed and String Instruments, Sampler, Drum Programming, Tape Manipulation, Field Recording, Radio and Electronics, Synthesizer, Voice, Mixing and Production
- Ryan Mahan – Synthesizer, Piano, Drum Programming, Voice
- Matt Ricchini – Mastering
