= Shook World (Hosted by Algiers) =

Studio album by King Vision Ultra
- Released: January 27, 2023
- Recorded: November 4 – December 4, 2022
- Genre: Hip hop; experimental
- Length: 58:40
- Label: PTP
- Producer: King Vision Ultra

Algiers chronology
There Is No Year (2020)	Shook World (Hosted by Algiers) (2023)	Shook (2023)

King Vision Ultra chronology
An Unknown Infinite (2021)	Shook World (Hosted by Algiers) (2023)

Shook World (Hosted by Algiers) is a mixtape album from King Vision Ultra. It is a companion to Algiers' 2023 album Shook. Shook World melds together audio samples from Shook that were provided by Algiers, with snippets from a personal archive of cassettes originally sourced from outlets like Kim's Video and Music and mixtape purveyors Tape Kingz back in the 1990s, plus personal phone field recordings and voice memos. Shook World featured guests include Elucid, Bigg Jus, Dreamcrusher, LaTasha N. Nevada Diggs, Matana Roberts, Nakama., Desde, Rena Anakwe, Marcus, Lord Kayso, Harlem Boog, DJ Haram, Dis Fig, maassai, amani, No Land, with additional field recordings courtesy of Taja Cheek (L’Rain) and Ara Kim, with Franklin James Fisher of Algiers hosting.

In December 2022, King Vision Ultra and Algiers previewed the two albums by playing them live as part of a sound clash at Brooklyn's National Sawdust, billed as "Shook vs Shook World". The lineup of special guests included amani, Big Rube, Billy Woods, DeForrest Brown Jr., Desde, Dreamcrusher, Elucid, Fatboi Sharif, King Vision Ultra, Latoya Kent, maassai, Mark Cisneros, and Patrick Shiroishi.

== Track listing ==
All tracks are written by King Vision Ultra.

Shook World (Hosted by Algiers) track listing
No.	Title	Length
1.	"Saturday Morning, April 04, 2020, Old Apt with Mel"	0:29
2.	"Inferno of 1992" (LaTasha N. Nevada Diggs – poet, Matana Roberts – saxophone)	4:00
3.	"Irreversible, Devil" (with Elucid)	3:26
4.	"DJ Kid Capri playing Mtume's 'Bigger's Theme', circa 1991"	0:45
5.	"Untrappings" (with Dreamcrusher)	4:02
6.	"You Alreadyyy"	0:43
7.	"Swing!" (with Nakama.)	2:36
8.	"Fangs" (with Desde)	1:51
9.	"Stand On It_Lite Work" (Nakama. – raps, Rena Anakwe – showtime)	2:38
10.	"Good Money (interlude)"	2:48
11.	"Please Leave (Nu Surveillance State Gentrifier Tears)" (Marcus – turntable)	4:19
12.	"Paper Chase (snippet)" (with Dreamcrusher)	2:51
13.	"Media Training" (with Lord Kayso)	3:02
14.	"Cold Hex" (with Desde)	2:58
15.	"2010 Interlude" (with Harlem Boog)	3:09
16.	"Tragic World Weapon" (DJ Haram – poet, Marcus – turntable, Dis Fig – voices)	3:53
17.	"Clean Facelift" (with Maassai)	3:24
18.	"Shatterproof" (with Amani)	4:05
19.	"Sleepwalker"	0:22
20.	"Vampire Tourbillon" (with Bigg Jus)	2:36
21.	"Watcher's Shroud" (with No Land)	4:32
