= Dead Pioneers =

American punk band

- Origin: Denver, Colorado, U.S.
- Genre: Punk rock
- Years active: 2020–present
- Labels: Hassle Records, Alternative Tentacles
- Members: Gregg Deal; Josh Rivera; Abe Brennan; Lee Tesche; Shane Zweygardt
- Website: deadpioneers.band

Dead Pioneers is an American punk band formed in Denver, Colorado. The group is centered on the work of vocalist and visual artist Gregg Deal, whose practice as a painter, performance artist, and writer informs the band's lyrics, visual identity, and political themes. The band consists of Deal, guitarists Josh Rivera and Abe Brennan, bassist Lee Tesche, and drummer Shane Zweygardt.

The band has released three studio albums: Dead Pioneers in 2023, Po$t American in 2025, and Wagon Burner in 2026. The debut album was self-released and later reissued by Hassle Records, which also released the band's second and third albums.

== History ==
Dead Pioneers originated in Gregg Deal's visual and performance art practice. Deal, an Indigenous artist whose work includes painting, public art, performance, and spoken word, began the project after receiving a grant from RedLine Contemporary Art Center to add original music to his performance work The Punk Pan-Indian Romantic Comedy. Deal later met Lee Tesche, the guitarist for the band Algiers, during an artist residency at the Atlantic Center for the Arts in Florida. Deal and Tesche collaborated for a poetry reading during the residency, producing the demo for "Bad Indian". In a 2024 interview on Turned Out a Punk, Deal described Dead Pioneers as another medium for the same concerns present in his visual and performance work, calling the band "an extension of the art" and connecting some of the songs to spoken-word performance.

After receiving a second grant from The Music District, the band recorded its self-titled debut album over two days at The Blasting Room in Fort Collins. The album was self-released in 2023. The band later signed with British label Hassle Records, which reissued the debut album and released the group's follow-up records.

The band released the 7-inch single "Bad Indian" through Alternative Tentacles, the label founded by Jello Biafra. After performing with Pearl Jam bassist Jeff Ament's hardcore punk band P.E.S.T., Dead Pioneers were invited to open four shows for Pearl Jam in April 2025. The same month, the band released its second album, Po$t American, through Hassle Records. The album was reviewed by Emily Pothast in the Soundcheck section of The Wire, who discussed the record in relation to Deal's visual art, spoken-word poetics, and critiques of Native American representation in American popular culture.

In May 2025, the band toured Europe with Pennywise, Propagandhi, and Comeback Kid. Colorado Public Radio described 2025 as a breakout year for the band, noting the release of Po$t American, Pearl Jam support dates, and a European tour with Propagandhi and Pennywise.

Dead Pioneers released their third album, Wagon Burner, on June 26, 2026, through Hassle Records. The album was preceded by the singles "No Kings", "Nazi Teeth" featuring Stephanie Byrne of Cheap Perfume, "Never Alone" featuring Aimee Interrupter of The Interrupters, and "The Worst Among Us" featuring Jason Williamson of Sleaford Mods.The album also features a spoken-word contribution from comedian and filmmaker W. Kamau Bell on "A Message From Mr. Bell", which serves as an introduction to "No Kings".

== Style and themes ==
Dead Pioneers' work has been discussed in relation to Gregg Deal's broader practice as a visual artist, performance artist, and writer. In The Wire, Emily Pothast connected Deal's visual art and lyrics to the band's music, describing Po$t American as drawing from punk, 1990s metal, and experimental rock while using samples and film quotations to critique Hollywood and popular culture's representations of Native Americans.

In a 2024 interview on Turned Out a Punk, Deal described Dead Pioneers as an extension of his performance and visual art practice, saying that he was "saying the same things" in the band that he had said in his other work. He also described some of the band's songs as pieces that could be performed as spoken word, connecting the project to his broader artistic practice.

Musically, Dead Pioneers have been described as politically charged punk that combines spoken word, hardcore punk, and post-punk elements. Coverage of the band has emphasized themes of Indigenous representation, colonialism, racism, capitalism, and class politics.

In a review of Po$t American, Louder Than War described the band's sound as fusing hardcore and post-punk, while noting that the album incorporated post-hardcore textures and heavier, darker arrangements. Guitar World wrote that Wagon Burner expanded the band's sound beyond straightforward hardcore punk into heavier, more atmospheric, and more dynamic material.

== Members ==
- Gregg Deal – vocals
- Josh Rivera – guitar
- Abe Brennan – guitar
- Lee Tesche – bass
- Shane Zweygardt – drums

== Discography ==
=== Studio albums ===
Title	Year	Label	Notes
Dead Pioneers	2023	Self-released; later Hassle Records	Reissued by Hassle Records
Po$t American	2025	Hassle Records	
Wagon Burner	2026	Hassle Records	

=== Singles and selected songs ===
- "Bad Indian" – Alternative Tentacles / Hassle Records
- "Never Alone" featuring Aimee Interrupter
- "The Worst Among Us" featuring Jason Williamson

== Reception ==
Louder Than War named both Dead Pioneers and Po$t American as "Album of the Week", with reviewer Nathan Brown praising the debut's directness and describing Po$t American as a heavier and darker continuation of the band's sound. Reviewing Po$t American for The Wire, Emily Pothast framed the album through Deal's visual art and spoken-word poetics, discussing the record's critique of settler colonial imagery, American western mythology, and representations of Native Americans in film and popular culture. PopMatters described the band's debut as a critique of capitalism, racism, sexism, prejudice, and corruption in contemporary American society.

Wagon Burner received positive reviews from Kerrang! and PopMatters. Kerrang! gave the album a 4/5 rating and described it as "real American punk rock". PopMatters rated the album 8/10, calling it "one of the most engaging, fun punk records of the year".
