= Nun Gun =

Band

- Origin: London, England
- Genres: Experimental; Electronic; Post-punk; Southern hip hop; Chopped and screwed; industrial; Dub
- Years active: 2021–present
- Members: Brad Feuerhelm; Ryan Mahan; Lee Tesche
- Website: nungun.bandcamp.com

Nun Gun is a multimedia collaboration between visual artist Brad Feuerhelm, and musicians Lee Tesche and Ryan Mahan of the band Algiers. Their debut release, Mondo Decay, pairs a book of Feuerhelm's photography with an accompanying original soundtrack cassette produced by Tesche and Mahan. The project features guest contributions from Mark Stewart of The Pop Group, Adrian Sherwood, ONO, Mourning [A] BLKstar, artists Luiza Prado and Farbod Kokabi, as well as authors Blake Butler, Michael Salu, and Sohail Daulatzai.

== History ==
The idea for Nun Gun began in London in 2013, when Feuerhelm and Tesche spent an evening accidentally playing a copy of the soundtrack for Roberto Donati's Cannibal Ferox soundtrack at the wrong speed. After realizing their mistake, the two decided that, at some point they would create their own slowed-down horror score paired with Feuerhelm's imagery.

After winning the 2021 Ear/Eye Award, Mondo Decay was released as a 144-page photo book with an accompanying cassette on February 19 by Witty Kiwi. Mondo Decay "turns the tourist gaze of mid-century Italian exploitation films onto post-industrial America, while scavenging the pulpiest bits of their soundtracks, giving them the chopped and screwed treatment, and festooning them with Tesche's brash sax flourishes."

Mondo Decay's very specific sound is due to Nun Gun's self-described “goth & screwed” technique—write & record at regular speed, bounce the digital files to tape, then manipulate and slow down the tape, and bounce it back to digital.

Kenneth Dickerman of The Washington Post notes, "one of the most notable things is the slowing down of the narration and music. Listening to it sounds, at times, somewhat like a halting, droning garbage disposal dying as it tries to eviscerate whatever detritus you put in there, trying to flush away. It sounds like melting objects, warped records, oozing trash, or maybe the sound your brain makes while malfunctioning. I love it." Emily Bick, in her The Wire review continues, "This is seductive, fierce, critical music that makes no bones about exactly who was crushed to keep the world burning."

On April 17, 2021, Nun Gun released a companion LP, Stealth Empire (In Dub), featuring continued collaborations with Mark Stewart, ONO, Mourning [A] BLKstar, Blake Butler, and a dub version of the title track by Adrian Sherwood.

== Discography ==
=== Studio albums ===
- Mondo Decay (2021)
- Stealth Empire (In Dub) (2021)
