= Devin Kenny =

American artist (born 1987)

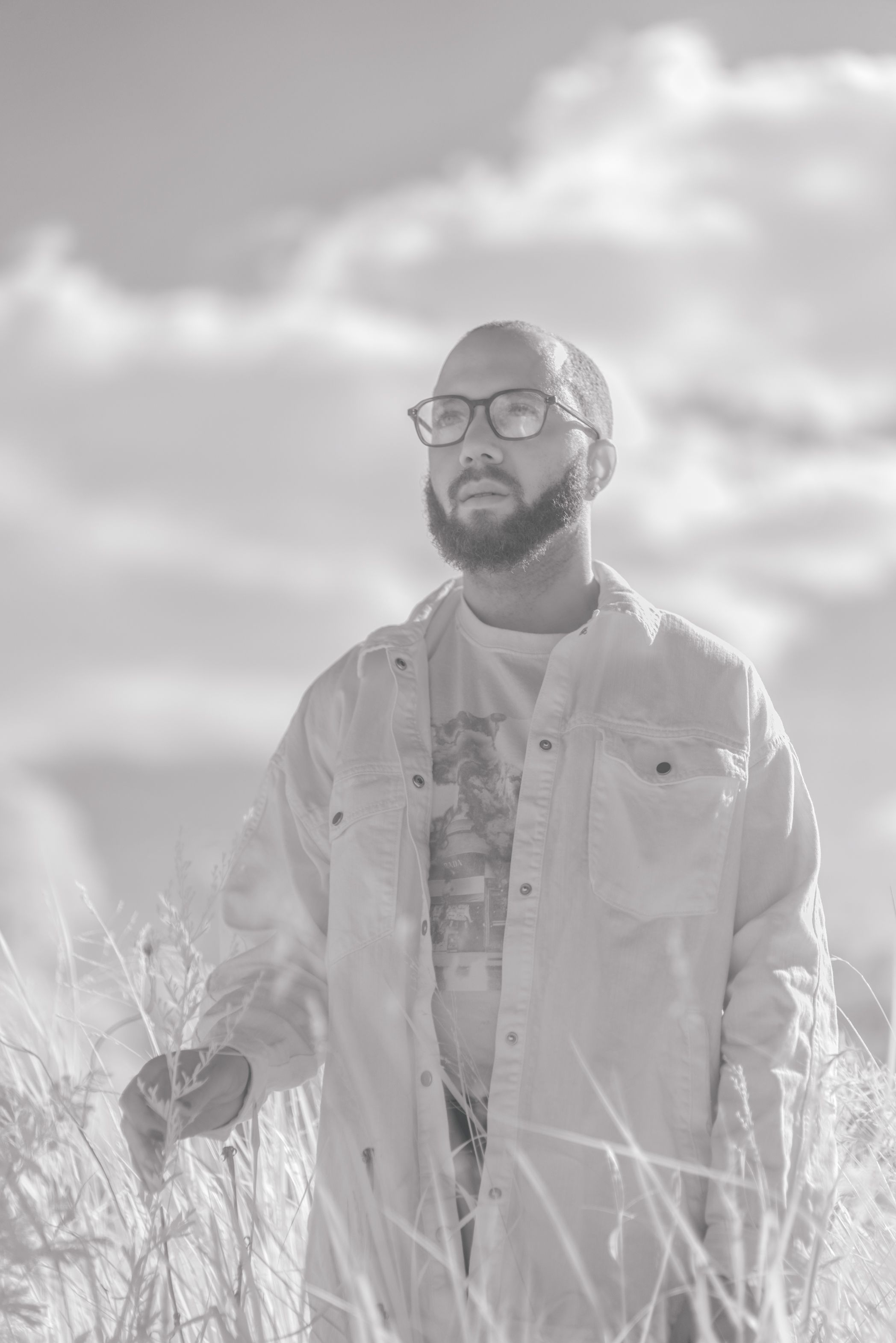
- Kenny in 2021 (photo by Jay Tovar)
- Born: 1987 (age 38–39); Hyde Park, Chicago, Illinois, U.S.
- Education: Cooper Union; University of California Los Angeles
- Website: www.devinkenny.info

Devin Kenny (born 1987) is an interdisciplinary artist, musician, writer, and curator who works across music, text, sculpture, painting, videos, photography, garments, and performances. Kenny's work has addressed network technology and the Black Atlantic, gentrification, the prison industrial complex, experimental music, subculture and countercultures, and alternative economies.

== Early life ==
Kenny was born in Hyde Park, Chicago, and lived shortly afterwards in West Hollywood, California, where his mother Deranne Kenny was pursuing her acting career. He moved often in his early life as a result of his mother passing away from breast cancer when he was a child. He briefly lived with his half-sister who was in the Navy, residing in Silver Spring, Maryland and Jacksonville, North Carolina, and returning to the Hyde Park/Kenwood neighborhood on Chicago's South Side, where he would remain until age 18.

== Education ==
Kenny received a bachelor's degree in Fine Arts from Cooper Union in 2009. In 2008, while at Cooper Union, he completed an exchange program at the Gerrit Rietveld Academie in Amsterdam.

He participated in Trade School organized by Caroline Woolard and an early iteration of the Bruce High Quality Foundation University, originally a sponsored project from Creative Time. From 2011 to 2013, he attended the University of California Los Angeles, graduating from the New Genres Department with a Masters in Fine Arts in 2013.

Kenny has participated in multiple residency programs, including Skowhegan School of Painting and Sculpture in 2009, Whitney Independent Study Program (ISP) from 2014 to 2015, SOMA in 2013, the Core Program Museum of Fine Arts, Houston from 2017 to 2019, Shandaken Projects 2018, and the Rauschenberg Residency #44 in winter/spring 2020.

== Teaching ==
Kenny has taught courses at Rutgers University, Parsons New School of Design, The University of Houston, and the Block Program at The Glassell School of Art, and has been a visiting critic at Yale University.

== Work ==
Kenny's artistic works include sculptures, paintings, readymades, music, and sound/audio works, and have been exhibited in solo art exhibitions and group shows.

Regarding the many themes Kenny takes up in his work, a 2019 review of his solo show at MoMA PS1 stated:

Devin Kenny takes an experimental, multidisciplinary approach to analyzing the contemporary Black experience. Exploring surveillance, abuses of institutional power, and gentrification, he balances abstract concepts with material traces of once subcultural but now quite ubiquitous forms of expression such as manga, hip-hop, and internet memes.

— Alex Bienstock

Kenny's work fluctuates between social commentary and dark humor, and has addressed social death, Black erasure in NYC folk history, reparations, ethnomathematics, hip hop and community activism.

Kenny has performed at international art institutions and programs, including Artists Space, The Hammer Museum, The Kitchen, Performance Space, Artspace Auckland, REDCAT, Kunsthall Stavanger, Julia Stoschek Collection, Contemporary Arts Museum Houston, and Performa.

=== Performance essays ===
Kenny is known for multiple types of performance, including “performance essays” or "performance-lectures", an experimental presentation format combining original speech, music, and other media, alongside multimedia and digital art, poetry and music.

=== Music ===
Kenny has created music under the alias Devin KKenny, “a play on the fact that an unfamous name often can be misspelled”, Lil Resin, Chainz Problematic, and Wieder Care, among others.

His music projects typically are self-released concept albums, and are shown online (such as on the now-defunct Newhive platform) or in art spaces like NYC's The High Line, and appear on independent radio such as WFMU and KCHUNG, TV stations like KCET, DIY venues, and other music and entertainment spaces.

Kenny's Studio Workout series rap mixtapes project accompanied a long-running Tumblr blog with the same name. His Studio/WRKOUT was an exploration of the tropes of hypermasculinity in rap through Lacanian terms and diagrams, and an unauthorized collaboration with Chuck Inglish production. Some of Kenny's Studio Workout series was showcased in Julia Stoschek Collection Düsseldorf. Alone We Play explored intersections between internet culture and street life in U.S. cities. The music video for this project was directed by Jarrod Turner and released through MOCATV.

Los Giros De la Siguiente (under the dkyk alias) draws parallels between being a subject of an oppressive state power and being in an abusive relationship. This project was sonically exploring connections between cumbias rebajadas and chopped and screwed hip-hop and was highly influenced by Kenny's time in Houston, Texas. Aspects of this work were shown in CAMH Houston; Santiago, Chile (as part of the Crónicas de estar y desaparecer Exhibition organized by Maricruz Alarcón and Margarita Sánchez); Stavanger, Norway as part of L E A N, curated by Legacy Russell, Associate Curator, Exhibitions; The Studio Museum in Harlem; Shanghai, China (as part of the More More More exhibition); Berlin (sheet music was featured as part of the Strange Attractors exhibition in the Berlin Biennale 2018 curated by Nomaduma Masilela); and Long Island City, Queens, NY as part of the Rootkits Rootwork exhibition. Devin Kenny's fictional collaboration with Drag Lomax, which grew from research into Black erasure in folk music and early instances of counterculture in New York's West Village, has manifested in music video work shown on NYC's High Line as part of the Musical Brain Organized by Melanie Kress, High Line Art Associate Curator.

In 2021 Kenny made his first official release with New York-based avant-garde label PTP (also known as Purple Tape Pedigree).

Devin Kenny has performed music for the influential GHE20G0TH1K party, and has collaborations with Chino Amobi a.k.a. Diamond Blackhearted Boy, avant-garde turntablist Maria Chavez, and musician/digital artist Albert Vyle Johnson. He also has created artworks centered on music such as 2Maintain for the Storefront for Art And Architecture, which centered on the use of the term ‘maintain’ in 1990s hip hop in relation to the nationwide rebellions against anti-blackness and the Black Lives Matter movement in 2020.

=== Film ===
In 2024, Kenny created the short film Sharp Rotation, a film essay which hinges on the many meanings of "cipher".

== Selected exhibitions ==
=== Solo shows ===
- "Ongoing, Individual Adaptability or How to Quiet Quit", Whitney Museum of American Art, 2022.
- "Rookits rootwork”, MoMA PS1, June 9-September 2, 2019.
- “Wrong Window”, Aran Cravey Gallery, February 13-April 4, 2015.
- "REVENGE BODY POLITICS (THE REPO MAN SINGS FOR YOU, THE SPEAKING IMPLEMENT READS FOR FILTH),” Goethe-Institut/Ludlow 38, September 20-October 18, 2018.

=== Group shows ===
- “Coop Fund, Amalle Dublon & Constantina Zavitsanos, Devin Kenny, John Neff”, Artists Space, February 11-March 31, 2018.
- “A New Job to Unwork At”, Participant Inc. September 9-October 14, 2018.
- “Then They Form Us”, Museum of Contemporary Art Santa Barbara, August 8, 2015 – October 25, 2015.

== Selected publications ==
=== Poetry ===
- "Classic Man", Poetry Project, February 25, 2016.

=== Essays ===
- Devin Kenny's Decade in Internet, Rhizome, December 30, 2019.
- Looking Back: BOMB on the Past Decade in Art], BOMB, December 23, 2019.
- Feasts Under the Bridge, The New Inquiry. August 7, 2015.
- Age of Sand/Book of Ledgers, Unbag, Spring 2017.
- Altered States, Real Life. April 24, 2018.

== Collections ==
- Whitney Museum of American Art, Not This featuring Betty Shelby, Brian Encinia, Jason Stockley, Jeronimo Yanez, and Peter Liang, (video), 2018.
