= Stealth Empire (In Dub) =

Studio album by Nun Gun
- Released: April 17, 2021
- Genre: Experimental; dub
- Length: 53:23
- Label: Algiers Recordings
- Producer: Lee Tesche

Nun Gun chronology
Mondo Decay (2021)	Stealth Empire (In Dub) (2021)

Stealth Empire (In Dub) is an album from Nun Gun, the multimedia collaboration between visual artist Brad Feuerhelm, and musicians Lee Tesche and Ryan Mahan of the band Algiers. The release is a companion album to their Mondo Decay project and expands upon their work with Mark Stewart of The Pop Group.

== Track listing ==
All tracks are written by Nun Gun.

No.	Title	Length
1.	"Stealth Empire" (featuring Mark Stewart)	4:15
2.	"Super Dub" (featuring Mark Stewart)	4:26
3.	"Outlaw Empire" (Adrian Sherwood Mix)	3:38
4.	"A4 ####### (Mallarmé read by Mark)"	2:26
5.	"On Neurath's Bass"	4:51
6.	"On Neurath's Boat" (featuring Farbod Kokabi w/ Mourning [A] BLKstar)	5:12
7.	"Stealth Dub"	3:41
8.	"Sankara Speaks"	7:15
9.	"The Supermen" (featuring Mark Stewart)	3:54
