= NOISE (compilation album) =

Compilation album by Various artists
- Released: December 20, 2016
- Genre: Noise
- Length: 1:43:05
- Label: Williams Street

NOISE (stylized as N O I S E) is a compilation album released by Adult Swim. It was curated by Laura Sterritt and incorporates a wide variety of styles within the genre of noise music.

== Track listing ==
1. Clipping. feat. SICKNESS – Body for the Pile (4:24)
2. Melt-Banana – Case D in the Test Tube (1:58)
3. EYE – Mega Equipment for Popsicle (4:47)
4. Vessel – PRIHATIN (3:44)
5. Sadaf – The Clinic (3:55)
6. Arca – Bussy (1:53)
7. Pharmakon – Squall (6:49)
8. Tanya Tagaq – Erie Changys (4:04)
9. BEAST – You've Got Rabies on Your Breath (12:01)
10. Dreamcrusher – Sick World (3:24)
11. Perc – Porthia (5:10)
12. Noveller – Processional (4:03)
13. Merzbow – For Adult (16:55)
14. Prurient – Everything You Know Is Wrong (7:38)
15. Hassan Khan – Casiotone Gigantija (3:36)
16. Wolf Eyes – Subterranean Life (18:44)
