= Violence (musician) =

American musician

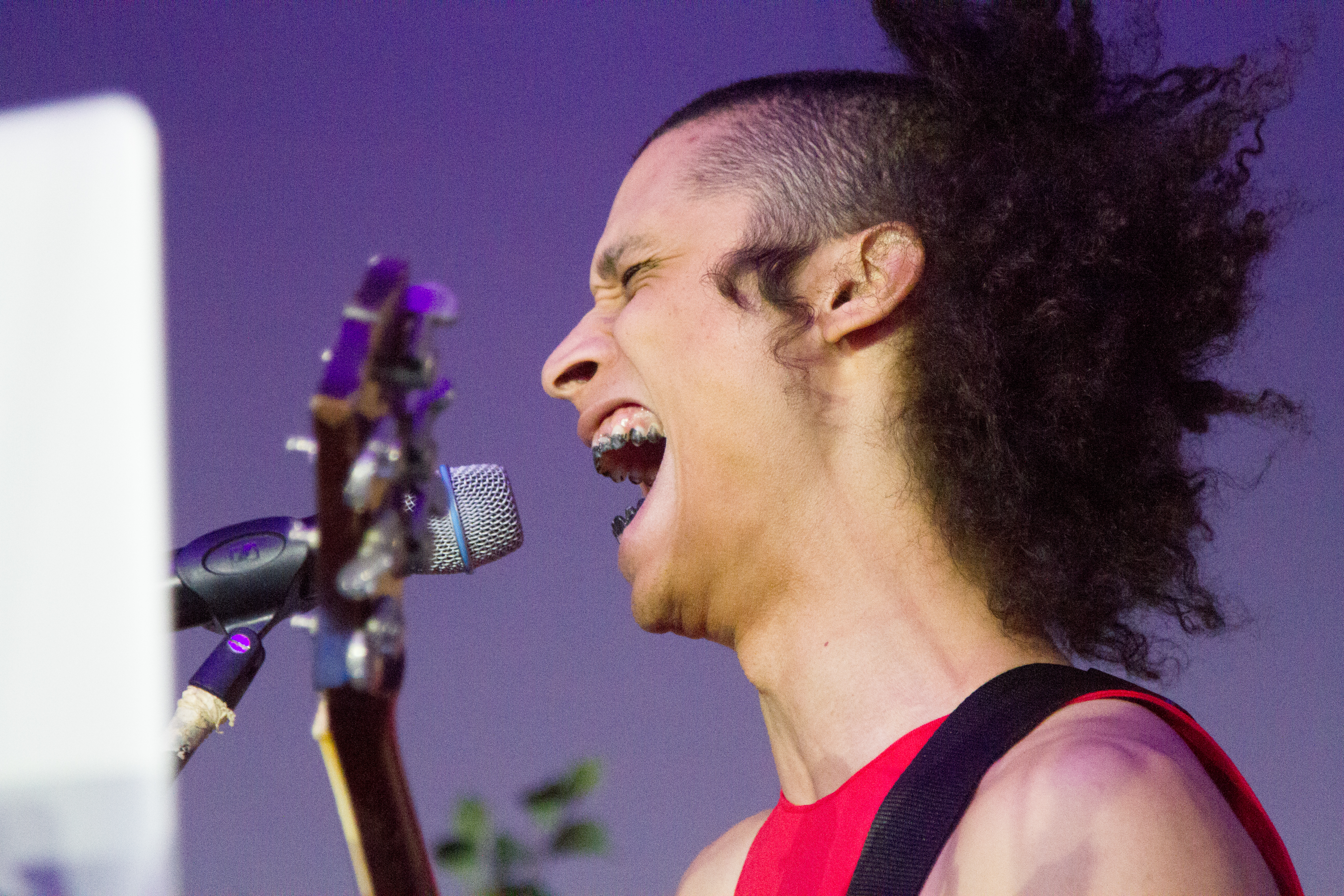
- Violence performing at MoMA PS1

Background information
- Origin: Baltimore, MD, United States
- Genres: Electronic, Hip hop, Grime, Black metal, Juke, Industrial music, Experimental, Dark wave, Dark ambient, Witch house
- Years active: 2010–present
- Labels: NON Worldwide, Dogfood Music Group, PTP
- Members: Olin Caprison
- Website: palmtreescaprisun.com

Olin Caprison, better known as Violence (stylized in all caps as VIOLENCE), is an American experimental musician, composer, performance artist, and producer.

== Life and career ==
Caprison was not seriously interested in performance while growing up in Baltimore, but began experimenting with making music while learning to edit video. They began recording and performing as Violence in 2010.

The first Violence release was REPTILE/Hand Me Downs from Heaven (Steak Au Zoo Records, 2012). In 2016, artist collective NON released Violence's A Ruse of Power, and the following year artist collective PTP (a.k.a. Purple Tape Pedigree) released Human Dust to Fertilize the Impotent Garden.

Violence has toured with Mykki Blanco and Yves Tumor, performed at the Brooklyn Museum, and was a 2019 MacDowell fellow in music composition.

== Discography ==
=== Albums ===
- REPTILE/Hand Me Downs from Heaven (Steak au Zoo Records, 2012)
- A Ruse of Power (NON Worldwide, 2016)
- Human Dust to Fertilize the Impotent Garden (PTP, 2017)

=== Singles ===
- "This is Going to be Disgusting, Unholy, and Pleasurable" (Dogfood Music Group, 2015)
- "Wintertime" (NON, 2015)
- "Psycud" (NON, 2016)
- "Rain" (NON, 2016)

=== Scores ===
- Kandis William's Affect:Network:Territory (Performed multiple times throughout 2016)
- Richard Kennedy's Both (2017)
- Richard Kennedy's HIR (2019)

=== Compilations ===
- Blasting Voice (Teenage Teardrops, 2012)
- Mykki Blanco Presents: C-ORE (Dogfood Music Group, 2015)
