= Performance-lecture =

Lecture that blends aspects of teaching and performance art

A performance lecture or lecture-performance is a genre of presenting ideas live, that blends aspects of teaching and performance art. Performance lectures draw attention to the form of knowledge presentation, the situational elements of teaching, and the dynamics of lecturer and audience interaction.

The genealogy of the lecture-performance is a topic of active discussion, with various critics offering multiple ways to trace the precursors of the format. There is a long history of performances in the fine arts that experiment with form to call attention to education, and educational contexts, how teaching itself is a live performance, art education and institutional structures, and pedagogy as a mode of production and social gathering. Performance lectures also appear in other performing arts and literary contexts, such as theatre.

Some artists that have worked in this genre include: Andrea Fraser, Chris Burden, Yvonne Rainer, Coco Fusco, Robin Deacon, Devin Kenny, Hito Steyerl, Goodiepal, and the arts collectives Bruce High Quality Foundation, and Metahaven.
