= Gregg Deal =

American artist and musician (born 1975)

- Gregg Deal, photographed by Shane Balkowitsch
- Born: 1975 (age 50–51); Tennessee, U.S.
- Education: George Mason University
- Known for: Performance art, mural work, painting, filmmaking, spoken word
- Notable work: The Last American Indian on Earth; White Indian; American Genocide Reconciled Thru Football
- Spouse: Megan Deal
- Website: greggdeal.com

Gregg Deal (born 1975) is an American visual and performance artist, muralist, filmmaker, activist and musician. A member of the Pyramid Lake Paiute Tribe, his multidisciplinary work examines Indigenous identity and representation, American history, race, popular culture and stereotypes through painting, performance art, public art, filmmaking and spoken word.

Deal's work has been exhibited or presented at institutions including the Denver Art Museum, the Smithsonian Institution, History Colorado and the Gallery of Contemporary Art at the University of Colorado Colorado Springs. He was the inaugural Native American Artist in Residence at Fort Lewis College in 2022 and was a keynote speaker at the American Alliance of Museums Annual Meeting in 2023.

Deal is also the lead vocalist and primary lyricist of the punk band Dead Pioneers.

== Biography ==
Deal was born in Tennessee in 1975 and raised in Utah. He is an enrolled member of the Pyramid Lake Paiute Tribe.

Deal developed interests in drawing, graffiti, skateboarding and punk music while growing up in Utah. These interests later became recurring influences on his visual and performance practice.

As a young adult, Deal moved to the Washington, D.C., area with his wife, Megan. He enrolled at George Mason University in 1999, studying art with a concentration in painting. He subsequently worked as a graphic designer and later as a full-time artist.

Deal and his family lived in the Washington, D.C., area for approximately 17 years before relocating to Colorado, where he continued his studio, performance and public-art practice.

== Career and artwork ==
=== Early career and performance work ===
While living in the Washington, D.C., area, Deal developed a multidisciplinary practice encompassing painting, graphic art, street art, performance and filmmaking.

In 2004, Deal worked at the newly opened National Museum of the American Indian in Washington, D.C., as a docent and cultural interpreter. He later participated in a mentorship with performance artist James Luna. Deal accompanied Luna to the Venice Biennale, where he assisted with Luna's performance project Emendatio.

Deal has cited Luna as an important influence on his development as a performance artist. After working with Luna, Deal developed The Last American Indian on Earth, a performance project examining stereotypes surrounding Native identity and the ways contemporary Indigenous people are perceived in public space.

The project received national attention and was profiled by The Washington Post. Deal's art and advocacy also led to appearances on the Comedy Central programs The Daily Show and Totally Biased with W. Kamau Bell.

His other performance and conceptual projects have included REDSKIN, White Indian, American Genocide Reconciled Thru Football, Supreme Law of the Land and The Punk Pan-Indian Romantic Comedy.

After relocating to Colorado, Deal participated in the Native Arts Artist-in-Residence program at the Denver Art Museum. He later served as an artist-in-residence at the University of California, Berkeley during the 2017–2018 academic year.

=== Later exhibitions and institutional work ===
In 2018, Deal gave the TEDxBoulder talk Indigenous In Plain Sight, addressing Indigenous representation, historical narratives and contemporary Native identity.

In 2021, History Colorado presented Deal's exhibition Merciless Indian Savages. Its title refers to language used in the United States Declaration of Independence. The exhibition combined historical imagery, popular culture and contemporary Indigenous subjects to examine stereotypes, romanticized versions of American history and the erasure of Indigenous people.

That year, Deal was a Mentoring Artist for Residency #183 at the Atlantic Center for the Arts in New Smyrna Beach, Florida. The three-week residency also included poet Bob Holman and musician Shahzad Ismaily as Mentoring Artists.

In 2022, the Gallery of Contemporary Art at the University of Colorado Colorado Springs presented Deal's solo exhibition Esoo Tubewade Nummetu (This Land Is Ours), featuring work concerned with Indigenous identity, American history, popular culture and representations of Native people.

Later that year, Deal became the inaugural Native American Artist in Residence at Fort Lewis College in Durango, Colorado. During the residency, he used the college's art gallery as a working studio, taught a course and worked with students and members of the community.

Also in 2022, Deal gave a second TEDx talk, Buying corpse tags on eBay: my work as an Indigenous artist, at TEDxMileHigh. The talk discussed his artwork in relation to Indigenous genocide, historical memory and the representation of Native peoples in the United States.

In 2023, Deal presented the keynote session Indigenous in Plain Sight at the annual meeting of the American Alliance of Museums. His presentation addressed Indigenous identity and representation in museums and was followed by a discussion with artists, curators and museum professionals about representations of Indigenous peoples in museum practice.

Also in 2023, Deal's work was included in Desert Rider: Dreaming in Motion at the Denver Art Museum, an exhibition examining lowrider culture, skateboarding, identity and mobility in the American Southwest.

In 2025, the Sordoni Art Gallery at Wilkes University presented Deal's solo exhibition I'm So Bored with the U.S.A.. The exhibition included painting, sculpture and performance-related work drawing on punk music and popular culture, with works from projects including The Last American Indian on Earth, Indigenous Flag, Never Forget and The Space Where Spirits Get Eaten.

=== Public art and activism ===
Deal's art and activism frequently address contemporary Indigenous issues, including representation, colonial history and the use of Native names and imagery in American popular culture.

He was involved in the movement to change the former name of Washington's NFL team and created work addressing the broader Native American mascot controversy. His #changethename project invited Indigenous people to contribute their perspectives to the public debate over Native sports mascots.

In 2020, Deal created Take Back the Power, a large public mural in Colorado Springs depicting his daughter Sage with a red handprint across her face. The work was created to draw attention to missing and murdered Indigenous women, girls and LGBTQ people.

Deal's public-art practice incorporates imagery drawn from advertising, comics, punk graphics and historical depictions of Native people, often recontextualizing those sources to address colonialism, racism and contemporary Indigenous identity.

== Music ==
Deal is the lead vocalist and primary lyricist of Dead Pioneers, a punk band that developed from his performance-art practice.

The project grew out of Deal's performance work The Punk Pan-Indian Romantic Comedy, for which he began combining spoken word with original punk music.

During his 2021 residency at the Atlantic Center for the Arts, Deal met Lee Tesche of Algiers. While preparing a community performance, Deal and Tesche recorded an early version of the song "Bad Indian". After returning to Colorado, Deal continued developing the material with guitarist Josh Rivera and drummer Shane Zweygardt, and the project evolved into Dead Pioneers.

Dead Pioneers released their self-titled debut album in 2023, followed by Po$t American in 2025 and Wagon Burner in 2026.

Deal's lyrics and spoken-word vocals address themes also found in his visual work, including Indigenous identity, colonialism, racism, American history and contemporary politics. He has described the musical project as connected to his broader artistic practice.

== Influences and themes ==
Deal has cited James Luna as a major influence on his performance practice. His mentorship with Luna and participation in Luna's work at the Venice Biennale contributed to Deal's development of performance art as a central part of his own practice.

Punk music, skateboarding, graffiti, street art, comics and graphic design are recurring influences in Deal's work. These influences are often combined with historical and popular imagery in work examining Indigenous identity, colonial history and the representation of Native peoples in American culture.

Deal has also cited street artists including Revok, Twist and Shepard Fairey, as well as Indigenous artists including Nani Chacon, Cheyenne Randall and Jared Yazzie.

== Selected exhibitions and presentations ==
- People, Common Ground, Washington, D.C. (2004)
- Popmatic, Sukio, Washington, D.C. (2010)
- From the Street to the Studio: The Work of Gregg Deal, Capital One, McLean, Virginia (2012)
- REDSKIN, Art All Night: Nuit Blanche, Washington, D.C. (2014)
- Pan-Indian Romantic Comedy, Woolly Mammoth, Washington, D.C. (2015)
- This Is Indian Land, Art Mart, Fredericksburg, Virginia (2015)
- White Indian, Denver Art Museum, Denver (2016)
- There Is No Plan B, The Fridge, Washington, D.C. (2016)
- Supreme Law of the Land, Denver Art Museum, Denver (2017)
- Existence as Protest, RedLine, Milwaukee (2017)
- Merciless Indian Savages, History Colorado Center, Denver (2021)
- Esoo Tubewade Nummetu (This Land Is Ours), Gallery of Contemporary Art, University of Colorado Colorado Springs (2022)
- Native American Artist in Residence, Fort Lewis College (2022)
- Desert Rider: Dreaming in Motion, Denver Art Museum (2023)
- I'm So Bored with the U.S.A., Sordoni Art Gallery, Wilkes University (2025)

== See also ==
- List of Native American artists
- Visual arts by Indigenous peoples of the Americas
- List of Washington Redskins name change advocates
