= PTP (artist collective) =

American artist collective

- Founded: 2009
- Founder: GENG PTP (a.k.a. King Vision Ultra)
- Genre: experimental, hip hop, doom metal, electronic, noise rock
- Location: New York City
- Official website: ptp.vision

PTP, also known as Purple Tape Pedigree, is an American artist collective and independent record label based in New York City. PTP has been called "New York’s experimental incubator", and the collective has released recordings named among the best in new experimental, hip hop, metal, avant-garde, and electronic music. Pitchfork noted that "PTP's mission seems to be to annihilate genre boundaries and revel in the brilliant debris", and VICE has called PTP "home to some of the most boundary pushing music being made".

Artist Geng (stylized GENG PTP) founded the collective as a media platform in 2009, with label operations beginning in 2012. Artists associated with PTP include Dreamcrusher, YATTA, Dis Fig, Armand Hammer, Saint Abdullah, Celestial Trax, Among The Rocks And Roots, DeForrest Brown Jr. (also known as Speaker Music), H31R (the duo of maassai and JWords), madam data, Amani, photographer Richard R. Ross, and Geng, who also performs and records as King Vision Ultra.

PTP's projects include Silent Weapons, a live performance series raising money for causes including prison abolition and immigrant rights.

== History ==
In 2009, New York City born and based artist GENG PTP started a wide-ranging music blog on hip hop, hardcore, and punk; his friend NOTE assisted him and handled visuals and design. Geng named the platform Purple Tape Pedigree after Wu-Tang rapper Raekwon's 1995 hip hop classic Only Built 4 Cuban Linx (often called "the purple tape" for the colored plastic of its original cassette release); the album came out the same year Geng, then in his teens, transitioned from cassette decks to turntables, going on to collaborate with the Atoms Family hip hop collective in the late '90s and produce beats for Dipset in the early 2000s. Friends soon joined Geng and Note in writing for the blog, creating visuals, organizing radio sets, booking performances, and eventually releasing music.

The first two official Purple Tape Pedigree releases came out in 2012 and 2015; after the second, Celestial Trax's Ride Or Die EP, PTP began to release recordings more frequently. As the platform grew into a collective with a distinct identity not solely affiliated with hip hop or DJ culture, Geng began exclusively using the acronym PTP. Later he resumed using the full name and acronym interchangeably, explaining in 2021 that he doesn't feel a need to "put the Raekwon reference to the side" given the name's personal significance and potential to draw attention to a "lineage" that might otherwise be overlooked.

As PTP gained greater recognition, the collective began to prioritize using their platform to provide support for community members in need. In 2018, PTP started a live performance series called Silent Weapons to raise money for organizations including Books Through Bars, The Bronx Freedom Fund, Black Alliance for Just Immigration, and Kids in Need of Defense. PTP has published several photo books, the first of which was also called Silent Weapons; the volume, by photographer Richard R. Ross, documents the first year of performances in the namesake series. In 2017, PTP released a benefit album for Puerto Rico following Hurricane Maria, and in 2020 PTP was noted for donations to racial justice initiatives, as well as for including a PDF of Alex S. Vitale’s The End Of Policing with all digital purchases.

In 2024, PTP announced RESIST COLONIAL POWER BY ANY MEANS NECESSARY, a massive 95-track compilation raising funds for Gaza and Haiti. The sprawling release eschews hierarchy, with a wide range of artists (including a²z, Algiers, Bergsonist, bookworms, Dakn x Hiro Kone, DJ Manny, E L U C I D, Fatboi Sharif x Malik Abdul-Rahmaan, gushes, HxH, June McDoom, Kevin Richard Martin & KMRU, Omar Ahmad x Myyuh, Rachika Nayar, RaFia, subt.le, Swaya, Tati au Miel, The Body, Yaeji, and many more) included in alphabetical order. The release's Bandcamp page credits pro-Palestinian organization Within Our Lifetime for inspiring the title.

== Critical reception ==
Records in PTP's catalog have been praised as among the best in experimental music by publications and organizations including NPR Music, The Wire, Bandcamp Daily, Pitchfork, Mixmag, CVLT Nation, and SLUG Magazine. Notable releases include Celestial Trax's Nothing is Real (2017); Kepla and DeForrest Brown Jr.'s Absent Personae (2017) and The Wages Of Being Black Is Death (2018); YATTA's WAHALA, which was included in Pitchfork, Bandcamp Daily, and the Wire as among the best albums of 2019; Dis Fig's PURGE (2019); 9T Antiope's Nocebo (2019) and Placebo (2020); Copperhead's Gazing in the Dark (2019); Dreamcrusher's Panopticon! and Another Country; Amani and King Vision Ultra's An Unknown Infinite (2020); and madam data's The Gospel of the Devourer (2021), a "sweeping epic of metal, noise and drone" featuring Moor Mother, Mental Jewelry, and King Vision Ultra.

Geng has pushed against the description of PTP as solely a label, saying the group's principles and practices of peer support and coalition-building are more akin to those of an artist collective or community. The outlet has nevertheless received significant recognition for its work releasing music: alongside many other accolades, PTP was a featured label in Resident Advisor and named among the TIU Mag best labels of 2015 and Mixmag best labels of 2016. In 2019, Tiny Mix Tapes included the "beautiful experiment" of PTP among their favorite labels of the decade: "Drawing from and experimenting with the rich collective productions, social reimaginings, and conspiratorial caretakings tagged and thumping throughout NYC — Wu Tang, Powerule Crew, Mobb Deep — caretaker Geng less curated than colluded, clearing space within the chokeholding architectures of foreclosure and incarceration for séances of breath, ugly cries, lustrous comeups, and, above all, love stories".

== Discography ==
Includes cassette reissues and both official and "unofficial" releases (i.e., those released without a catalogue number).

Year	Artist	Title
2012	Gorgeous Children	Gorgeous Children
2012	GENG PTP	Screwing Yourself To Live: A Chopped & Slowed Tribute To Black Sabbath
2015	Celestial Trax	Ride Or Die EP
2015	Gang Fatale / CYPHR	Body Horror I
2015	MM / Imaabs	Body Horror II
2015	Eaves	GORILLA
2016	Joey LaBeija	Shattered Dreams
2016	Endgame	Savage EP
2016	DJ NJ Drone	Syn Stair
2016	Celestial Trax	From The Womb EP
2016	Baby Blue	CELL, Issue 01: Baby Blue/Void Gate + Audio Codex
2016	Endgame	Savage Remix EP
2016	Copout	Forces EP
2016	WWWINGS	CHIMERA EP
2016	Club Cacao	CELL, Issue 02: Club Cacao - Vae Solis
2016	N-Prolenta	A Love Story 4...
2016	ssaliva	CELL, Issue 03: ssaliva - keys2diversion
2016	0comeups	One Deep
2016	FLORA	CELL, Issue 04: FLORA - City God
2017	Eaves	Verloren
2017	ACAPELLA	CELL, Issue 05: ACAPELLA - Riot In Versace
2017	YATTA	Spirit Said Yes!
2017	Bonaventure	Free Lutangu
2017	GENG	PTP-RIDD01 (Narc)
2017	Violence	Human Dust to Fertilize the Impotent Garden
2017	Kepla & DeForrest Brown Jr.	Absent Personae (2017)
2017	Celestial Trax	Nothing Is Real
2017	VA (Compilation)	Shine
2018	Among The Rocks And Roots	Raga
2018	Saint Abdullah	Stars Have Eyes
2018	Nima Aghiani	REMS
2018	Armand Hammer	Paraffin
2019	Kepla & DeForrest Brown Jr.	The Wages Of Being Black Is Death
2019	9T Antiope	Nocebo
2019	Dis Fig	PURGE
2019	City & i.o	Spirit Volume
2019	YATTA	Wahala
2019	lojii	lofeye
2019	Copperhead	Gazing In The Dark
2020	Saint Abdullah	Where Do We Go, Now?
2020	Dreamcrusher	Panopticon!
2020	Dreamcrusher	Another Country
2020	A Space for Sound	Sound Bath Mixtape Vol.1
2020	Sour Spirit / Sour Data	LIVE DUSS I
2020	Sour Spirit	LIVE DUSS II
2020	Sour Vision	East Side Powerviolence
2020	Speaker Music & bookworms	As Serious As Your Life
2020	Amani & King Vision Ultra	An Unknown Infinite
2020	9T Antiope	Placebo
2020	King Vision Ultra	QUATTRO (death circus)
2020	H31r	Ve·loc·i·ty
2020	Speaker Music	a bitter but beautiful struggle
2020	AKAI SOLO	Eleventh Wind
2021	Contour	Weight
2021	AKAI SOLO x BSTFRND	Like Hajime
2021	Model Home + Saint Abdullah	Invasive Inclinations
2021	Mimz & Dunn	Infinite Lawn
2021	maassai	With The Shifts
2021	AKAI SOLO & Navy Blue	True Sky
2021	Cities Aviv	THE CRASHING SOUND OF HOW IT GOES
2021	madam data	The Gospel of the Devourer
2021	GENG PTP	Slowness as the Vehicle II
2021	Centennial Gardens	SPLIT
2021	Lungs/LoneSword	The Birth of LoneSword
2021	GENG PTP	Slowness as the Vehicle III
2021	phiik + S!LENCE	THAT WAS A TEST
2021	Devin KKenny	NY LOTTERY / CBD KRATOM
2022	Lord Kayso	MOOR CHORES
2022	GENG PTP	Slowness as the Vehicle IV
2022	grey wulf	Path Of Urda
2022	Swaya	EXistence
2022	GENG PTP	Slowness as the Vehicle: Portishead Forever
2022	Fatboi Sharif x noface	Preaching In Havana
2022	Straw + GENG PTP	RETROVERTIGO
2023	YATTA	Fully Lost, Fully Found
2023	King Vision Ultra	Shook World (hosted by Algiers)
2023	babyfang	In The Face Of
2023	seina sleep & YoursTruuly	TRUUSLEEP
2023	Dreamcrusher	Suite ONE
2023	E L U C I D	Every Egg I Cracked Today Was Double Yolked (REDUX)
2023	kœnig	1 Above Minus Underground
2023	Centennial Gardens	archive live 03.26.2023 mucho stereo
2023	Dreamcrusher	Suite TWO
2023	Temp-Illusion	failsafe
2024	Various Artists	RESIST COLONIAL POWER BY ANY MEANS NECESSARY
2024	Dawuna	Southside Bottoms (Mixtape)
2024	Lo.S.O	Posted
2024	Tegh & Adel Poursamadi	After You Left
2024	Big Flowers x Messiah Musik	Save The Bees
2024	Maral	Patience (صبر)
2024	YATTA	PALM WINE
2024	King Vision Ultra	pain of mind (recalled)
2024	Rojin Sharafi	O.O.Orifice
2024	GENG PTP	flexymech20152016
2025	AMILES	Aight So Boom
2025	Tati au Miel	Tati au Miel (deluxe edition)
2025	gushes	Delicious Collision
2025	yaz lancaster	AFTER
