= Cheap Perfume =

American feminist punk band

- Origin: Colorado Springs, Colorado, United States
- Genres: Punk rock • hard rock • riot grrrl
- Years active: 2015-present
- Label: Snappy Little Numbers
- Members: Stephanie Byrne; Jane No; Geoff Brent; David Grimm
- Website: https://cheapperfume.bandcamp.com/music

Cheap Perfume is a feminist punk rock band that formed in 2015 in Colorado Springs, Colorado. The band consists of lead vocalist Stephanie Byrne, co-vocalist and guitarist Jane No, drummer David Grimm, and bassist Geoff Brent. The members met through local music circles and mutual friends. The band cites influences such as Bikini Kill, Le Tigre, Fugazi, X-Ray Spex, Sleep, and Taylor Swift. Their music incorporates themes related to gender, power, and social justice.

== Discography ==
=== Albums ===
- Nailed It (2016)
- Burn It Down (2019)
- Don't Care. Didn't Ask. (2025)

=== Singles ===
- It's Okay (To Punch Nazis) (2017)
- TKO (2021)
- No Men (2021)
- Down To Riot (2025)
- Okay Party (2025)
- Dead If I Do (2025)
- Woke Mind Virus (2025)

Cheap Perfume released their third album, Don’t Care. Didn’t Ask., on October 3rd, 2025. Crave Music Magazine described the record as capturing the band’s “anger, authenticity, and passion for their community,” noting its “unapologetic lyricism” and blend of sharp guitar riffs and rhythmic percussion. Guitarist and vocalist Jane No explained that the album addresses systemic issues, stating that it “kind of zooms out and looks at most problems in the world, including inequality, as a result of capitalism, and we hope it starts conversations around that and inspires people to dream beyond it." No further noted that although the album did not have a pre-selected theme, it ended up focusing heavily on anti-capitalism: “we didn’t choose a theme, but it ended up being a lot of anti-capitalism, because, as we say before we play our song, ‘Probably It’s Capitalism’ on stage... Stephanie usually says something along the lines of ‘This song is about how all of your problems are probably caused by capitalism.’ Because the patriarchy needs capitalism; capitalism needs the patriarchy. And so basically, any system of hierarchy that we have is tied to capitalism, and so a lot of our frustration and thoughts about that are coming out in this album… Of course, we’ve always railed against capitalism, but maybe more so on this one."

== Reception ==
The band is praised for their strong political themes, energetic delivery, and punk rock feminism. In her review of the album Burn it Down, Kayla Greet from Maximum RockNRoll says "[the album] Definitely has that kinda blown-out, screechy, female howl to the vocals. And yet the next track, 'Fauxminism,' is taken down several notches and delivered in this bouncy, pop punk, bubblegum package. I’m really into singing sweet harmonies about shitty false feminism." Ken Sanderson from Maximum RockNRoll also describes the use of energetic political songs in the album Nailed It, saying "The lyrics go between sassy and brutal, assailing sexism, Trump, male expectations of women, navigating relationships, defining consent, and their enunciated clarity pins with the music to make it all shout-along friendly."

Julie River from New Noise Magazine anticipates their newest album, Don't Care. Didn't Ask., will be positively received and help the band gain greater recognition. She says in her review that "Don’t Care. Didn’t Ask. doesn’t have a single misstep on it; it’s an absolute joy to listen to from start to finish, and it’s likely to result in the name 'Cheap Perfume' becoming more well known in punk scenes outside of Colorado as well."

== Events ==
The band went on a West Coast tour with Sarah and the Safe Word in 2024. It was the band's first tour, though they had previously played outside of Colorado for events like 2023's Mind The Gap Fest in Salt Lake City, Utah. Cheap Perfume played for the 2025 Underground Music Showcase in Denver, Colorado. Cheap Perfume has performed with several prominent punk and riot-grrrl acts. They opened for Bikini Kill on August 25, 2024, in Salt Lake City, Utah, and appeared at Punk in the Park 2025, held July 18–20, 2025, at the National Western Stockyards in Denver. They are scheduled to tour several Midwestern cities in late 2025, including Minneapolis, Milwaukee, Chicago, St. Louis, and Wichita.
