= There Is No Year =

Studio album by Algiers
- Released: January 17, 2020
- Recorded: April–May 2019
- Studio: Figure 8, New York; Strange Weather, New York; Studio E, New York
- Length: 36:58
- Label: Matador
- Producer: Randall Dunn and Ben Greenberg

Algiers chronology
The Underside of Power (2017)	There Is No Year (2020)	Shook World (hosted by Algiers) (2023)

Singles from There Is No Year
- 1. "Dispossession" Released: October 29, 2019; 2. "We Can't Be Found" Released: January 9, 2020

There Is No Year is the third studio album by American experimental band Algiers. It was released through Matador Records on January 17, 2020. The album was produced by Randall Dunn and Ben Greenberg. During the lead up to the release, the band issued two non-album singles, "Can the Sub_Bass Speak?" and the Adult Swim Singles Club release of "Void". Special editions of the album include these songs as bonus tracks.

== Background ==
The concept for the album was based around a poem, by singer Franklin James Fisher, entitled Misophonia.

== Critical reception ==
Professional ratings
Aggregate scores
Source	Rating
Metacritic	75/100
Review scores
Source	Rating
AllMusic	4/5 stars
DIY	3/5 stars
The Line of Best Fit	7.5/10
musicOMH	4/5 stars
NME	4/5 stars
The Observer	4/5 stars
The Guardian	4/5 stars
Pitchfork	6/10

There Is No Year has received generally positive reviews. AllMusic described the album as extending "the reach of their previous outings while offering a more strategically articulated, disciplined musicality without sacrificing their core sound or blunting their emotional impact." NME described the album's lyrics as urgent and more precise than their predecessor's. They also praised the album's diverse sound for blending post-punk, ’60s soul, gospel, disco and noise.

== Track listing ==
There Is No Year track listing
No.	Title	Length
1.	"There Is No Year"	3:15
2.	"Dispossession"	4:15
3.	"Hour of the Furnaces"	4:26
4.	"Losing Is Ours"	3:44
5.	"Unoccupied"	3:06
6.	"Chaka"	3:53
7.	"Wait for the Sound"	4:11
8.	"Repeating Night"	3:02
9.	"We Can't Be Found"	3:25
10.	"Nothing Bloomed"	3:41
Total length:		36:58

== Personnel ==
All personnel credits adapted from There Is No Year album notes.

Algiers

- Franklin James Fisher
- Ryan Mahan
- Lee Tesche
- Matt Tong

Vocals, guitar, bass, drums, programming, piano, synthesizers, percussion, sheet metal, prepared instruments and eight-stringed oddities

Additional musicians

- Skerik – saxophone
- LaToya Kent – backing vocals
- Kyle Kidd – backing vocals
- Lou the Dog – backing vocals

Technical

- Randall Dunn – producer, mixing, additional programming, modular synth, percussion and sound design, Korg MS-20, Modal 001, Ensoniq ESQ-1
- Ben Greenberg – producer, additional programming and MPC 2000
- Garrett DeBlock – mixing assistant
- Jason Ward – mastering
- Farbod Kokabi – art direction and design
- Kenji Anorve; – studio assistant (studio E)

== Charts ==
Chart performance for There Is No Year
Chart (2020)	Peak position
German Albums (Offizielle Top 100)	85
