= Dub siren =

Synthesizer

A dub siren is a type of synthesizer used predominantly in dub music. It is usually a relatively simple oscillator, housed in a box, often allowing for a variety of waveforms to be altered by turning potentiometers controlling pitch, rate and other parameters. Dub sirens are frequently activated by a button, sometimes able to be toggled between continuous synthesis with one button press, or sound emission only when the button is held.

== Usage ==
Thought to have been originated by sound systems, dub sirens are used predominantly to generate a series of rhythmic pitches in dub and reggae music.

== See also ==
- Kraakdoos
- Atari Punk Console
