= Algiers (Algiers album) =

Studio album by Algiers
- Released: June 2, 2015
- Recorded: April–June 2014; 4AD Studios; London
- Genre: Psychedelic soul
- Length: 44:35
- Label: Matador
- Producer: Algiers and Tom Morris

Algiers chronology
Algiers (2015)	The Underside of Power (2017)

Singles from Algiers
- 1. "But She Was Not Flying" Released: January 22, 2015; 2. "Blood" Released: February 24, 2015; 3. "Irony. Utility. Pretext." Released: March 24, 2015; 4. "Black Eunuch" Released: April 14, 2015

Algiers is the debut studio album by American experimental band Algiers. The album was released through Matador Records on June 2, 2015.

== Critical reception ==
Professional ratings
Aggregate scores
Source	Rating
AnyDecentMusic?	7.3/10
Metacritic	79/100
Review scores
Source	Rating
AllMusic	4/5 stars
Clash	8/10
DIY	3/5 stars
Drowned in Sound	9/10
The Irish Times	4/5 stars
MusicOMH	4/5 stars
NME	7/10
Pitchfork	7.7/10
PopMatters	8/10
Uncut	7/10

Algiers received positive feedback from contemporary music critics upon release. At Metacritic, which assigns a normalized rating out of 100 to reviews from mainstream critics, the album received an average score of 79, based on 13 reviews, which indicates "generally favorable reviews".

In his review for AllMusic, Thom Jurek stated that, "Algiers, both band and album, offer musical and topical intensity alternately malevolent and passionate in searching and affirming truth, human and otherworldly. All of these seemingly disparate historical musical elements are distilled in such a startling manner, they carve something new from the fragments. This is a stunning debut."

== Accolades ==
Publication	Accolade	Year	Rank
The Quietus	The Quietus Albums Of 2015	2015	63
Treble Magazine	Top 50 Albums of 2015	2015	5
PopMatters	The 80 Best Albums of 2015	2015	13
Entertainment Weekly	The 40 Best Albums of 2015	2015	24
Drowned in Sound	Favourite Albums of the Year 2015	2015	38
Uncut	The Best Albums of 2015	2015	51
Under the Radar	Favourite Albums of the Year 2015	2015	80

== Track listing ==
No.	Title	Length
1.	"Remains"	3:05
2.	"Claudette"	3:31
3.	"And When You Fall"	3:41
4.	"Blood"	5:38
5.	"Old Girl"	4:24
6.	"Irony. Utility. Pretext."	4:30
7.	"But She Was Not Flying"	3:58
8.	"Black Eunuch"	3:39
9.	"Games"	3:49
10.	"In Parallax"	8:20

== Personnel ==
All personnel credits adapted from Algiers album notes.

Algiers

- Franklin James Fisher – lead vocals, backing vocals, guitar, piano, rhodes, wurlitzer, percussion, cello, drums, sampling
- Ryan Mahan – bass, TR-808, Juno-6, ARP String Ensemble, Prophet-5, wurlitzer, programming, percussion, guitar, backing vocals
- Lee Tesche – guitar, prepared piano, prepared guitar, programming, percussion, backing vocals

Additional musicians

- Natalie Judge – backing vocals (8)

Technical

- Tom Morris – producer, mixing
- Carl Saff – mastering

Design

- Nicola Morrison – cover and interior paintings
- Lamb & Sea – design
- Sam Campbell – photography
- Brad Feuerhelm – photography
