= The Underside of Power =

Studio album by Algiers
- Released: June 23, 2017
- Recorded: June–October 2016
- Studio: Argot Studio, New York; Figure 8, New York; Goat Farm, Atlanta; Real World, Bath; Rex Studios, London; Strange Weather, New York; Walker Studios, New York
- Genre: Gospel, post-punk, industrial, punk blues
- Length: 44:24
- Label: Matador
- Producer: Adrian Utley and Ali Chant

Algiers chronology
Algiers (2015)	The Underside of Power (2017)	There Is No Year (2020)

The Underside of Power is the second studio album by American experimental band Algiers. The album was released through Matador Records on June 23, 2017. The album was produced by Adrian Utley of Portishead and his frequent collaborator Ali Chant. It was also the band's first album to feature drummer Matt Tong as a full-time member.

== Critical reception ==
Professional ratings
Aggregate scores
Source	Rating
AnyDecentMusic?	8.2/10
Metacritic	86/100
Review scores
Source	Rating
AllMusic	4/5 stars
Alternative Press	4.5/5 stars
The A.V. Club	A
Financial Times	4/5 stars
The Irish Times	4/5 stars
The Observer	4/5 stars
Pitchfork	5.8/10
Rolling Stone	3.5/5 stars
Uncut	7/10
Vice	A−

The Underside of Power received widespread critical acclaim from contemporary music critics. At Metacritic, which assigns a normalized rating out of 100 to reviews from mainstream critics, the album received an average score of 86, based on 21 reviews, which indicates "universal acclaim".

In his review for AllMusic, Thom Jurek wrote that, "Algiers ultimately turn doomsday on its head unexpectedly. On The Underside of Power, they assert that even amid violence, darkness, and horror, that the human spirit is affirmed through witness and resistance, leading not only to solace but to redemption."

=== Accolades ===
Publication	Country	Accolade	Rank
American Songwriter	US	American Songwriter's Top 25 Albums of 2017	15
Magnet	US	Top Albums of 2017	24
PopMatters	US	The Best Indie Rock of 2017	1
Spectrum Culture	US	Top 20 Albums of 2017	17
Under the Radar	US	Under the Radar's Top 100 Albums of 2017	36
The Village Voice	US	Pazz & Jop 2017	29
Gigwise	UK	Gigwise's 51 Best Albums of 2017	26
MusicOMH	UK	musicOMH's Top 50 Albums Of 2017	13
The Quietus	UK	Quietus Albums Of The Year 2017	24
State	Ireland	State's Albums of 2017	24

== Track listing ==
No.	Title	Length
1.	"Walk Like a Panther"	3:10
2.	"Cry of the Martyrs"	4:03
3.	"The Underside of Power"	4:12
4.	"Death March"	4:31
5.	"A Murmur. A Sign."	3:43
6.	"Mme Rieux"	3:34
7.	"Cleveland"	3:46
8.	"Animals"	2:33
9.	"Plague Years"	2:52
10.	"Hymn for an Average Man"	4:10
11.	"Bury Me Standing"	2:25
12.	"The Cycle/The Spiral: Time to Go Down Slowly"	5:25

== Personnel ==
All personnel credits courtesy of AllMusic.

Algiers

- Franklin James Fisher – cello, double bass, drum programming, guitar, keyboards, percussion, piano, sampling, synthesizer, tambourine, vocals, wurlitzer
- Ryan Mahan – bass, drum programming, guitar, baritone guitar, sampling, synthesizer, backing vocals
- Lee Tesche – cymbals, guitar, harmonium, loop, music box, percussion, prepared guitar, prepared piano, saxophone, synthesizer, backing vocals
- Matt Tong – chimes, drones, drums, glockenspiel, guitar, percussion, backing vocals

Additional musicians

- Ashiya Eastwood – backing vocals
- Jessica Upton Crowe – backing vocals
- Travis Ono – backing vocals

Technical

- Adrian Utley – producer, drum machine, guitar, moog bass, synthesizer
- Ali Chant – producer, guitar, backing vocals
- Alex Weston – engineer
- Ben Greenberg – additional production, engineer
- Chris Kyles – engineer
- Jason Ward – mastering
- Macks Faulkron – engineer, guitar, percussion
- Oli Jacobs – engineer
- Patrick Phillips – engineer
- Paul Reust – engineer
- Randall Dunn – mixing
- Will Smith – mixing assistant

== Charts ==
Chart (2017)	Peak position
Switzerland (Schweizer Hitparade)	69
