= Makoto Azuma =

Japanese flower artist and botanical sculptor

- Born: 24 July 1976 (age 49); Fukuoka Prefecture, Japan
- Known for: Flowers, flower arranging, botanical sculpture

Makoto Azuma (東 信, Azuma Makoto; born July 24, 1976) is a Japanese flower artist, botanical sculptor, and co-founder of JARDINS des FLEURS.

== Biography ==
Born in Fukuoka Prefecture, Azuma moved to Tokyo in 1997 to pursue his dream of becoming a rock musician. Around this time he took a job as a trader in the Ota Market, one of Japan's largest flower and produce markets. He cites his job at the Ota Market as the inspiration for pursuing a career in flowers. With his interest in ornamental flowers piqued, he then took a job managing a flower shop in Azabu-Jūban in 1999.

Azuma began his career as a flower artist in 2002 with the opening of the flower shop JARDINS des FLEURS. He partnered with photographer Shiinoki Shunsuketo to open the flower shop. Around 2005 Azuma began to explore a new form of floral design that he called botanical sculpture, the work for which he is now known.

== Career ==
- 2016
  - Sep 28 - Stage Collaboration with Dries Van Noten 2017 S/S Women's collection, using original artwork "Iced Flowers"
  - Sep 20-25 - Installation, "Botanical sculpture" for FUJIFILM's booth at Photokina, Cologne, Germany
  - Aug 27 - Sep 25 - Art Installation, "Drop Time" at the Mass in Jingumae, Tokyo
  - Jun 21 - Art Installation, "Burning Flowers" at an Old Rock Quarry Site in Tochigi, Japan
  - May 16–29 – Art Collaboration, “FENDI FLOWERLAND” at Selfridges & Co, London
  - Apr 9-10 – Exhibition, Botanical Sculpture #6 Dynamite at AMFC, Tokyo
  - Apr – Botanical installation live, “PALM TREE x ALGIERS”
  - Mar 25 - Apr 17 – Art Collaboration, “FENDI FLOWERLAND” at FENDI GINZA, Tokyo
  - Mar 17 – May 9 – Exhibition, Human l Nature curated by Andrew Zuckerman #5 capsule at CHAMBER, NYC
  - Mar 9-15 – Art Collaboration, “FENDI FLOWERLAND” at Isetan Shinjuku, Tokyo
  - Feb 19-21 – Exhibition, “Botanical Sculpture Polypore” at AMFC, Tokyo
  - Jan 25-30 – Art installation, “PETAL BOX” at Colette, Paris
- 2015
  - Dec – Art direction, “Flower Universe” for Planetarium at Haneda international airport, Tokyo
  - Nov – Installation, “Fur Tree” for FENDI Ginza pop-up store, Tokyo
  - Nov – Exhibition, “Azuma Makoto Exposition”, Lambersart, France
  - Nov – Installation for Christmas table of Royal Copenhagen “Silent forest”, Tokyo
  - Oct – Exhibition, ”Shiki : Landscape and Beyond”, Dallas
  - Oct – Art product, “Paludarium OSAMU” in CHAMBER NYC, NY
  - Sep – Art/Visual direction, Book of Pierre Herme ”SATINE”
  - Jul – Exhibition, “Blue Flower Rebellion”, Saga
  - Mar – Publication, “ENCYCLOPEDIA OF FLOWERS ll” released from Seigensha
  - Feb 13 – Art project “DAGAT & BULAKLAK”, in Philippines
  - Jan 10-11 – Exhibition, “ICED FLOWERS”, Saitama
- 2014
  - Jul – Art project “EXOBIOTANICA”, in the Black Rock Desert in Nevada
  - Jul – Popup shop “Floral shop AMKK” at the POOL aoyama, Minamiaoyama, Tokyo
  - Jun – Publication, “Flower Method Azuma Makoto” released from Bijutsu Shuppan
  - Jun – Installation of the entire floor for the opening ceremony at Toranomon Hills, Tokyo
  - May – Botanical Installation x live concert “The Lost Eden” for Dragon-i, Hong Kong
  - Apr – Special installation for Salvatore Ferragamo, at Isetan Shinjuku, Tokyo
  - Mar – Stage design for NHK Special 4 nights series “Adventure of Human body, the microscopic world”
  - Mar – Installation for the renewal opening of the fifth floor at Isetan Shinjuku, Tokyo
  - Mar – Second installment of Installation live “shiki x hakata cycos”, at the ex-pit for Ōya stone, Tochigi
  - Mar – Collaboration work with artist, Aya Takano “Shuen no mori, soshite hajimari (Forest of the end, and the beginning)” at Kaikaikiki Gallery, Motoazabu, Tokyo
  - Mar – Flower visual work for Dries van Noten “Inspirations” exhibition at Les Arts Décoratifs, Paris
  - Jan – Permanent exhibition of “Timeless pine” for an entrance of the office in Roppongi, Tokyo
- 2013
  - Dec – Installation, “The world’s smallest ice skate link” (in forest), Maison Hermès, Ginza
  - Dec – Ongoing installation for 6 months “Botanical Sculpture#6 Dance”, Hotel entrance, Shinjuku, Tokyo
  - Nov – 30th anniversary installation, “Bottle Flower tree”, Imperial Hotel, Tokyo
  - Oct – Public art installation, art fair “Abierto Mexicano Dedisano”, Mexico
  - Sep – Flower installation, Pierre Herme Paris new collection presentation, Tokyo
  - Sep – Flower installation, Pierre Herme Paris new collection presentation, Hong Kong
  - Aug – Botanical installation, “Botanical Ashtray”, Daikanyama T-SITE, Tokyo
  - Aug – 1st permanent botanical installation, “Cocoon”, Fukushimameisei High School, Fukushima
  - Jul − “Encyclopedia of Flowers” selected for ”50BOOKS 50COVERS” at design competition in the United States
  - May −Botanical installation live “shiki×Naturopolis-Tokyo”, live house, Roppongi, Tokyo
  - May – Flower installation for the special party at Galerie Perrotin, Hong Kong
  - Apr – Exhibition in collaboration with the jewelry brand BOUCHERON, Roppongi Hills, Tokyo
  - Apr – Vegetation and design objet chief director, Roppongi Hills 10th anniversary decoration, Roppongi Hills, Tokyo
  - Mar – Installation “Collapsible leaves”, Isetan Shinjuku Grand Opening, entire floor,
  - Mar – Art exhibition “Paludarium Shigelu”, Broached Gallery, Melbourne, Australia
  - Mar – Vegetation director, “HOUSE VISION 2013 Tokyo Exhibition”, Aomi, Tokyo
  - Mar – Publication, “Flower and I”(Kyuryudo) released
  - Nov – Window display “Toki no niwa – Jardin du Temps –“, Maison Hermès, Ginza, Tokyo
- 2012
  - Oct – Released compilation book “Encyclopedia of Flowers” English version (Lars Müller Publishers).
  - Sep – Art Exhibition as a part of Perrier-Jouët Belle Epoque Florale Edition launch for a month, São Paulo, Brazil
  - Aug – Installation live “shiki-toe” at a warehouse in Kiba, Tokyo
  - Jul – Released compilation book “Encyclopedia of Flowers” (Seigensha).
  - Jul – Collaboration, “Belle Epoque Florale Edition” with Perrier-Jouët
  - Apr – Art Exhibition, Original artwork of “LADY DIOR AS SEEN BY”, Ginza, Tokyo
  - Apr – Art Exhibition at “Luminale2012”, Frankfurt, Germany
  - Mar 11 – Apr 15 – Art Exhibition, “Time of moss” at “DESIGNING DESIGN“, Zendai Contemporary Art Space, Shanghai
  - Feb – Creative Director, SUNTORY Midorie (Urban ecological development project)
- 2011
  - Nov - Stage production, live performance “Hana to Mizu” (Naruyoshi Kikuchi & Hiroshi Minami) Tokyo
  - Nov – Publication, “2009 – 2011 Flowers” collection of artwork book released, Tokyo
  - Oct – Art Installation, Cassina ixc. (Interior) Aoyama, Tokyo
  - Oct – Art collaboration, fashion brand HELMUT LANG featuring “MAKOTO AZUMA#2”, Tokyo
  - Oct – Art Exhibition, “Collapsible leaves” at gallery GYRE EYE OF GYRE, Tokyo
  - Aug – Art Exhibition, “Botanical Sculpture #3 lump” at gallery void+, Tokyo
  - Jun – Art Exhibition, “Time of moss” at Beijing Center for the Arts, China
  - May – Art video work, “Drop time”
  - May – Art collaboration, fashion brand HELMUT LANG featuring “MAKOTO AZUMA”, Tokyo
  - Feb – Art Exhibition, ”shiki × bulb” at Triennale Design Museum, Milan
- 2010
  - Dec – Art Exhibition, ”shiki × bulb” at IMPOSSIBLE PROJECT SPACE, Tokyo
  - Nov – Art Exhibition, ”Alter Nature” at art center Z33, Belgium
  - Aug – Art Production, Landscape Design at boutique Valveat81, Tokyo.
  - Aug – Art Exhibition, “Frozen Flower” at gallery void+, Tokyo.
  - Aug – Launched Azuma Makoto Gardening Club
  - Jul – Art Production, ”BOTANICA ” mobile concept, KDDI (mobile communication), Tokyo
  - Jun – Art Exhibition, ”TOKYO FIBER SENSEWARE” at Design Museum Holon, Israel
  - May – Art Exhibition, ”Shiki1”, at Shanghai EXPO Japan industrial pavilion, Shanghai
  - Apr – Publication, monthly free paper “AMNP: Azuma Makoto News Paper”
  - Mar – Art Produce, ”Fashion In Nature“ at Galerie Michel Rein, Paris
  - Feb – Art Exhibition, “armored pine” at POLA Museum Annex, Tokyo
  - Feb – Art Installation, “Botanical Signboard” (advertisement) at MAZDA Zoom-Zoom stadium, Hiroshima
- 2009
  - Dec – Art Exhibition, “Bridge of Plants” at ARK Hills, Tokyo
  - Oct – Art Production & Exhibition, produced flower vase “hand vase”, Tokyo
  - Oct – Art Exhibition, “adidas Originals ” (fashion/sports collaboration), Tokyo
  - Sep – Art Exhibition, “TOKYO FIBER ’09 SENSEWARE” at 21_21 DESIGN SIGHT, Tokyo
  - Jul – Plants Installation, “Naoshima Sento I♥Yu”, at Naoshima public bath, Kagawa
  - May – Art Exhibition, “Daido Moriyama ‘Kiroku” on the road collaboration with 8 creators”, Tokyo
  - May – Art Exhibition, “Distortion × Flowers” GYRE EYE OF GYRE, Tokyo
  - Apr – Art Exhibition, “TOKYO FIBER ’09 SENSEWARE”, Triennale Design Museum, Milano
  - Mar – Art Exhibition, ”Azuma Makoto ’AMPG vol.25’” at Gallery Mitsubishi Artium (IMS), Fukuoka
- 2008
  - Oct – Art Exhibition, “2nd nature” at 21_21 DESIGN SIGHT, Tokyo
  - Jul – Art Exhibition, “BOTANICA(×)” at NRW Forum, Germany
- 2007
  - Apr – Art Exhibition, ”SHIRO NO KI” at Maison Martin Margiera, Tokyo
  - Apr – Art Exhibition, opened private gallery “AMPG” for two years in Tokyo
- 2006
  - Nov – Art Performance, “Kehai” for ”Les Soirees Nomades” (Cartier), Paris
  - Mar – Art Exhibition at gallery Mitsubishi-Jisho Artium (IMS), Fukuoka
- 2005
  - Dec – Art Exhibition at Sony building in Ginza, Tokyo
  - Dec – Art Exhibition, Christmas window display at popular select shop, colette in Paris
  - Nov – Art Exhibition, first collection outside Japan in Tribeca, New York

== Selected works ==
- Polypore, February 2016
- Iced Flowers, January 2015
- Exobiotanica, July 2014
