= Dreamcrusher =

- Origin: Wichita, Kansas, U.S.
- Genres: Experimental; avant-garde; noise
- Years active: 2003-present
- Labels: PTP; Fire Talk; Hausu Mountain; CORPUS
- Website: dreamcrusher.bandcamp.com

Luwayne Glass, better known as Dreamcrusher, is a Brooklyn-based noise musician from Wichita, Kansas.

Dreamcrusher has been the subject of features in The Village Voice, Pitchfork, and FADER; praised in SPIN and VICE; and was featured in a mini-documentary for PBS Digital Studios' Sound Field. Dreamcrusher's work has also been discussed in scholarly articles in the fields of musicology and queer/affect theory.

== Early life and career ==
Glass, who is non-binary, began making what they describe as "nihilist queer revolt musik" as a teenager sharing tracks on Myspace. After years of touring and over twenty independent releases, Glass moved to New York City in 2015. The same year, Fire Talk Records released Glass's Hackers All of Them Hackers under the Dreamcrusher name to broad acclaim: the release was included in Impose's Best Albums of 2015 and SPIN's Best Avant Albums of 2015, with VICE writing that the EP "could be the most important noise record of the year".

In 2016, Dreamcrusher was included on the Adult Swim compilation NOISE alongside artists including Merzbow, clipping., Melt-Banana, Wolf Eyes, and Pharmakon. They are also featured on hardcore punk band Show Me the Body's "collaborative mixtape" Corpus I, as well as in a music video accompanying the 2017 release.

Grudge2, released in 2018, further solidified Dreamcrusher's reputation as "one of New York’s finest noise mutants". The EP's tracks include "Youth Problem," featuring vocals by Alice Glass of Crystal Castles.

Dreamcrusher released two full-length albums in the summer of 2020. May's Panopticon! was included in Bandcamp Acid Test's Best Albums of 2020, Entropy's Top 10 Albums of 2020, Post-Trash's Best of 2020, and Mixmag's Albums of the Year. One month later, they released the full-length mixtape Another Country, which was included in Afropunk's 2020 in Review.

In October 2020, PBS Digital Studios' Sound Field aired a mini-documentary on Dreamcrusher, titled "The Untold Story of Noise and Experimental Music". Recorded in Brooklyn, New York during the pandemic, the episode features a socially-distanced interview and live performance at Saint Vitus.

== Performance style ==
Dreamcrusher is known for a live performance style that is interactive, high-engagement, and multi-sensorial, with Flood Magazine describing their live show as "a full-on, full-body sensory experience". They say in interviews that they prefer "an exchange with the audience" rather than providing an isolated "spectacle," "like eyeballs are on me, but there’s not an interest"; they move through the crowd rather than performing onstage, and often serve as the source rather than object of a show's lighting, wearing a strobing headlamp that illuminates those in the audience.

Those praising Dreamcrusher's live performances often acknowledge that this combination––of high volume, unpredictable movement, and even flicker vertigo––can be jarring, producing feelings of disorientation and vulnerability. Scholars Shoshana Rosenberg and Hannah Reardon-Smith frame the means and aims of Dreamcrusher's "affective atmosphere" as "electronics and harsh vocals (often screamed into the face of their audiences) to explore queerness, experiences of violence, and feelings of societal and relational abjection", but write that the resulting "psychophysiological states" can be transformative, generating "an ethics of care, through mutuality, solidarity and empathy". Similarly, David Farrow considers Dreamcrusher part of a music community in which explorations, performances, and even productions of pain can forge a "queer kinship" of "social connections that extend beyond performance".

== Discography ==
=== Albums ===
Year	Title	Label
2013	Incinerator	This Ain’t Heaven Recording Concern
2014	SUICIDE DELUXE	Hausu Mountain / Fire Talk
2015	Katatonia	Obsolete Units
2020	Panopticon!	PTP
2020	Another Country	PTP

=== EPs ===
Year	Title	Label	Notes
2009	Antipop	Dionysian Tapes	
2013	CANAL de HOLOGRAMS	NoKore	
2014	HAINE	Lazed In You	
2014	Lemlæstelse / I'm All Broke Up	Socialre	
2015	Split Cassette	This Ain’t Heaven	with Golden Living Room
2015	Hackers All Of Them Hackers	Fire Talk	
2016	Quid Pro Quo	Fire Talk	
2018	Grudge2	CORPUS	
2020	FICTION EP		featuring Dis Fig
