= Lyonnais (band) =

- Origin: Atlanta, Georgia
- Genres: Experimental rock, art rock
- Years active: 2008–present
- Labels: Geographic North
- Members: Farbod Kokabi; Farzad Moghaddam; Lee Tesche; TJ Blake

Lyonnais is an experimental rock band based out of Atlanta, Georgia. The band consists of Farbod Kokabi, Farzad Moghaddam, Lee Tesche, and TJ Blake.

Tesche is a founding member of the band Algiers, while Kokabi and Moghaddam run the Geographic North record label. Blake is a member of Lotus Plaza's touring band, the solo project of Deerhunter guitarist Lockett Pundt.

== Background ==
Lyonnais formed in 2008 after Kokabi and Moghaddam watched a Rhys Chatham performance together and set about trying to fill a void in the experimental Atlanta music scene". Tesche and Blake were later added to the line-up, fleshing the band out. The band spent their first three years performing dates with Deerhunter, Windy & Carl, Lightning Bolt, Zach Hill, Grouper, and members of Animal Collective while being named to Creative Loafing's Best of Atlanta list each year from 2009 to 2011. They released their debut Want For Wish For Nowhere on Geographic North in 2011. Want For Wish For Nowhere and "The Fatalist" were both listed on Pitchfork's Guestlist: Best of 2011.

== Discography ==
- Hurst Sessions (2009) (Limited edition tour only CS)
- WFWFNW (2010) (Limited edition tour only CS/CD)
- Want For Wish For Nowhere - (2012, Geographic North)
- Terminus OST - (2012, Geographic North)
- Anatomy of the Image - (2016, Geographic North)
