= DeForrest Brown Jr. =

Techno artist and theorist

DeForrest Brown, Jr.
- Also known as: Speaker Music
- Origin: Birmingham, Alabama
- Genres: techno, Black music, experimental, avant-garde, noise
- Occupations: cultural theorist, journalist, musician
- Labels: PTP, Planet Mu
- Website: https://speakermusic.bandcamp.com

DeForrest Brown, Jr. is a writer, music and media theorist, and curator. Brown releases music under his own name as well as by the moniker Speaker Music. Brown is a representative of the Make Techno Black Again campaign. His written work traverses "the links between the Black experience in industrialized labor systems and Black innovation in electronic music." It has appeared in Artforum, Triple Canopy, NPR, CTM Festival, Mixmag, among many others.

His first book, Assembling a Black Counter Culture, was published with Primary Information in 2022. His second book, this simulation sux, was co-written with the statistical analyst and visual designer Ting Ding and published by the small press DOMAIN in the summer of 2024.

== Early life and education ==
Brown was born in 1990 on MacDill Air Force base in Tampa, Florida. His family later moved to Birmingham, Alabama. His father was an educator and a deacon in the Southern Baptist Convention, while his mom was a social worker.

He attended Tuggle Elementary School which was founded by the abolitionist Carrie A. Tuggle in 1903.

His trumpet-playing was influenced by his father, with whom he shared an instructor. His father spent a few days in the same college band as the Afrofuturist icon Sun Ra.

Brown went to the University of North Alabama.

== Work ==
Brown moved to New York in 2013. He worked several bookstore jobs and began to write music criticism. He soon met Ting Ding and Luz Fernandez, who made Make Techno Black Again. At first, M.T.B.A. was a meme and then turned into a life of its own as a campaign in their gender-fluid clothing line, Hecha, and, afterwards, as a trio-collective when Brown created a mix for it.

'Absent Personae' was a collaboration between Liverpool-based sound artist, Kepla (a.k.a. Jon Davies), and Brown. It was released in 2017 under New York City’s Purple Tape Pedigree collective.

In 2018, he released a mixtape on PTP called, “The Wages of Being Black Is Death,” which garnered acclaim from Planet Mu, a U.K. label with a roster of prolific Black American producers.

Brown's 2022 book, "Assembling a Black Counter Culture," was released in 2022. The book provides a Black theoretical perspective on techno, setting it apart from its cultural assimilation into predominantly white, European electronic music scenes of the 2000s and 2010s. By referencing Theodore Roszak’s "Making of a Counter Culture," the writings of African American autoworker and political activist James Boggs, and Alvin Toffler’s "Third Wave" "techno rebels," Brown draws parallels between Black electronic music movements and Afrofuturist, speculative, and Afrodiasporic traditions to imagine a world-building sonic fiction and futurity within techno. Inspired by the pioneering work of early legends like The Belleville Three, Underground Resistance's multimedia creations, and Drexciya's mythscience, Brown shows how techno spread from Detroit to other cities worldwide through networks of collaboration, production, and distribution.

On June 21, 2024, Brown and tap dance artist Michael J. Love performed Standpoint (Rhy)pistemology at Amant in Brooklyn, NY. The performance mapped the foundational Black histories of techno and house music onto improvisational and choreographed tap dance.

== Discography ==
Release year	Title	Label	Personnel/Notes
2017	Absent Personae	PTP	Kepla & DeForrest Brown, Jr.
2018	The Wages of Being Black is Death	PTP	Kepla & DeForrest Brown, Jr.
2019	of desire, longing	Planet Mu	Speaker Music
2020	processing intimacy		Speaker Music
2020	Percussive Therapy		Speaker Music
2020	Black Nationalist Sonic Weaponry	Planet Mu	Speaker Music
2020	As Serious As Your Life	PTP	Speaker Music & bookworms
2020	a bitter but beautiful struggle	PTP	Speaker Music

== Bibliography ==
- Assembling a Black Counter Culture (2022, Primary Information)
- this simulation sux (2024, DOMAIN)
