= ONO (band) =

Experimental music group

- Origin: Chicago, Illinois, U.S.
- Genres: Industrial, Noise, Sound Art, Experimental rock, Gospel
- Years active: 1980–1986; 2007-present
- Members: travis; P. Michael; many collaborators
- Website: ono1980.com

ONO is a Chicago-based experimental music group formed in 1980.

The group's music is a unique combination of experimental noise and industrial music with gospel and spoken word performance. Their lyrics directly reference themes of racism, colonialism, and homophobia.

ONO is made up of core members vocalist travis (né Travis Dobbs) and multi-instrumentalist P. Michael, alongside a rotating lineup of musical collaborators.

== History ==
=== Early years (1980 - 1986) ===
Prior to joining the group, travis grew up playing piano in church and singing spirituals in his home in rural Mississippi. He served in the US Navy during the Vietnam War, a formative period during which he experienced severe racial discrimination and sexual violence. Native Chicagoan P. Michael grew up in a musical family which included several noted jazz musicians. Prior to forming ONO, he studied music and visual art and worked in academia.

ONO began with the meeting of travis and P. Michael in 1980. An early supporter and friend of the group was Al Jourgenson of Ministry, through whom they met scholar, performance artist, and musician Shannon Rose Riley. She has subsequently worked with the band from the 80s to the present. The name "ONO" was derived in part from onomatopoeia, to emphasize the non-musical, "noise" character of their sound.

The group developed a unique juxtaposition of industrial musique concrète and junk metal percussion alongside spoken word and liturgical organ. P. Michael's music was inspired by The Stooges and The Velvet Underground, whereas travis' vocals drew inspiration from Mahalia Jackson. During this period, ONO played extensively in and around Chicago, both solo and alongside acts including Lydia Lunch, Cabaret Voltaire, and Naked Raygun. They performed both in music venues and non-traditional spaces such as art galleries, a wedding, and the smoldering ruins of a still-burning house.

From the beginning ONO performances featured prominent ritualistic and theatrical element. The group frequently utilized confrontational and subversive imagery, including religious and occult iconography, drag, blackface, and other symbols of racial oppression. Early audiences, many of them punks, were divided by the project, and several early performances were disrupted or canceled due to the controversy the group provoked.

After early recordings were passed over by Wax Trax!, ONO began a relationship with Joe Carducci's Thermidor Records which produced two albums.

From 1986, the project lapsed into a period of inactivity lasting over 20 years. Group members shifted their energy toward other arts and academic projects.

=== Post-hiatus (2007 - present) ===
During their time of inactivity, awareness of the group and its work developed and their records became highly sought after.

Re-activation of the group was prompted by support from writer and musician Steve Krakow, who interviewed the group for the Chicago Reader in 2007 and featured them in his Secret History of Chicago Music column.

Since their re-activation, the group has played both in the US and internationally, released five new records, and received positive attention from prominent music press including The Wire and The Recording Academy (presenters of the Grammy Awards).

== Themes ==
ONO's work has been focused on themes of queerness, colonialism, historical trauma, and the African-American and Native American experiences. They describe themselves as "Exploring Gospel’s Darkest Conflicts, Tragedies and Premises".

ONO has frequently referenced specific historical events in their work. The group's 2020 album Red Summer is themed around the Chicago race riots of 1919, and the track "Syphilis" from the album describes the Tuskegee syphilis experiment. 2014's Diegesis references the Philadelphia MOVE bombing.

== Members ==
=== Current members ===
Sources:

- travis - vocals, lap steel (1980 - )
- P. Michael - bass, keyboards, electronics (1980 - )
- Shannon Rose Riley - vocals, keyboards, horns (1981 - )
- Rebecca Pavlatos - vocals, keyboards, percussion (2007 - )
- Dawei Wang - vocals, guitar (2007 - )
- Ben Baker Billington - drums (2014 - )
- Connor Tomaka - electronics, percussion (2015 - )
- Jordan Reyes - electronics, vocals (2016 - )
- Benjamin Karas - percussion (2015 - )

=== Past and intermittent members ===
Sources:

- Hallene Kathy Brooks (1980)
- Mark Berrend - guitar (1980)
- Ric Graham - guitar, trumpet, electronics (1981)
- Jesse Thomas - vocals, guitar, trombone, percussion (2007 - 2015)
- Mimi Wallman - vocals, percussion and electronics (2007 - 2015)
- Abe Gibson - drums (2007 - )
- Adam Wolack - drums (c. 2014)
- Jake Acosta - trumpet (c. 2014 - 2018)
- Brett Naucke - electronics (2007 - 2017)
- John Daniel (2019 - )

== Discography ==
=== Albums ===
- Kate Cincinnati (1982, self released)
- Machines That Kill People (1983, Thermidor)
- Ennui (1986, Thermidor)
- Albino (2012, Moniker Records)
- Diegesis (2014, Moniker Records)
- Spooks (2015, Moniker Records)
- Your Future is Metal (2018, American Damage Records)
- Red Summer (2020, American Dreams Records)

=== Singles ===
- I Dream of Sodomy (2018, Cold Moon Records)
- KONGO / MERCY (2020, Whited Sepulchre Records)
