= Black Encyclopedia of the Air =

Studio album by Moor Mother
- Released: September 17, 2021
- Genre: Hip-hop
- Length: 32:00
- Label: Anti-
- Producers: Olof Melander; Dudu Kouate; Madam Data

Moor Mother chronology
Brass (2020)	Black Encyclopedia of the Air (2021)	Jazz Codes (2022)

Black Encyclopedia of the Air is a studio album by American musician Camae Ayewa under the pseudonym Moor Mother. It was released on September 17, 2021, through Anti-. It received universal acclaim from critics.

== Background ==
Camae Ayewa, also known under the pseudonym Moor Mother, is an American musician based in Philadelphia. Black Encyclopedia of the Air is a follow-up to Brass (2020), her collaborative album with Billy Woods. She created the album in collaboration with Olof Melander. The album features guest appearances from Elucid, Antonia Gabriela, Brother May, Lojii, Saydah Ruz, Bfly, Orion Sun, Pink Siifu, Nappy Nina, Maassai, Yatta, Dudu Kouate, Black Quantum Futurism, and Elaine Mitchener. It was recorded at her home in March 2020, during the COVID-19 pandemic. It contains 13 tracks, clocking in at 32 minutes.

The album was released on September 17, 2021, through Anti-.

== Critical reception ==
Professional ratings
Aggregate scores
Source	Rating
Metacritic	83/100
Review scores
Source	Rating
AllMusic	4/5 stars
Beats Per Minute	84%
Exclaim!	9/10
Loud and Quiet	8/10
Mojo	4/5 stars
Pitchfork	7.9/10
PopMatters	8/10
The Skinny	3/5 stars
Uncut	8/10

According to the review aggregator Metacritic, Black Encyclopedia of the Air received "universal acclaim" based on a weighted average score of 83 out of 100 from 11 critic scores.

Chris Ingalls of PopMatters described the album as "Ayewa's relatively accessible take on hip-hop." He added, "Granted, this is a complex, dizzying, and challenging piece of work, but the arrangements are so expertly crafted and so tied into a retro-soul feel that the edges are somewhat easy to take." Paul Simpson of AllMusic stated, "Considerably less noisy than previous Moor Mother releases like her 2016 breakthrough Fetish Bones, the album flows through slippery jazz rhythms, mellow R&B vibes, and meditative ambient textures, with Ayewa's lyrics remaining forceful even as she's delivering them in a softer register." Daniel Sylvester of Exclaim! wrote, "Ayewa and Melander anchor many of the tracks with tempered, stretched, echoed, doubled and warped vocals and samples, increasing the claustrophobic, nervous energy across the album and giving it its distinctive sound and flow."

=== Accolades ===
Year-end lists for Black Encyclopedia of the Air
Publication	List	Rank	Ref.
Beats Per Minute	BPM's Top 50 Albums of 2021	49	
BrooklynVegan	BrooklynVegan's Top 50 Albums of 2021	14	
Crack	The Top 50 Albums of 2021	11	
Magnet	MAGNET's Top 25 Albums of 2021	15	
NPR Music	NPR Music's 50 Best Albums of 2021	35	
Pitchfork	The 50 Best Albums of 2021	27	
PopMatters	The 75 Best Albums of 2021	32	
Uncut	The Top 75 Albums of the Year	65	
The Wire	Releases of the Year (2021 Rewind)	2	

== Track listing ==
Black Encyclopedia of the Air track listing
No.	Title	Length
1.	"Temporal Control of Light Echoes"	2:59
2.	"Mangrove" (featuring Elucid and Antonia Gabriela)	2:09
3.	"Race Function Limited" (featuring Brother May)	2:37
4.	"Shekere" (featuring Lojii and Saydah Ruz)	2:10
5.	"Vera Hall" (featuring Bfly and Orion Sun)	2:28
6.	"Obsidian" (featuring Pink Siifu)	1:33
7.	"Iso Fonk"	1:37
8.	"Rogue Waves"	2:23
9.	"Made a Circle" (featuring Nappy Nina, Maassai, Antonia Gabriela, and Orion Sun)	2:47
10.	"Tarot" (featuring Yatta and Dudu Kouate)	5:54
11.	"Nighthawk of Time" (featuring Black Quantum Futurism)	1:13
12.	"Zami"	2:01
13.	"Clock Fight" (featuring Elaine Mitchener and Dudu Kouate)	2:08
Total length:		32:00

== Personnel ==
Credits adapted from liner notes.

- Moor Mother – executive production
- Olof Melander – production
- Dudu Kouate – co-production (10), production (13)
- Madam Data – production (12)
- Joe Baldacci – mixing
- Alex Nagle – mastering
- Curtis Talwst Santiago – artwork
- Todd M. Duym – photography

== Charts ==
Chart performance for Black Encyclopedia of the Air
Chart (2021)	Peak position
UK Album Downloads (Official Charts)	73
