= The College Hill Independent =

Student newspaper in Providence, Rhode Island

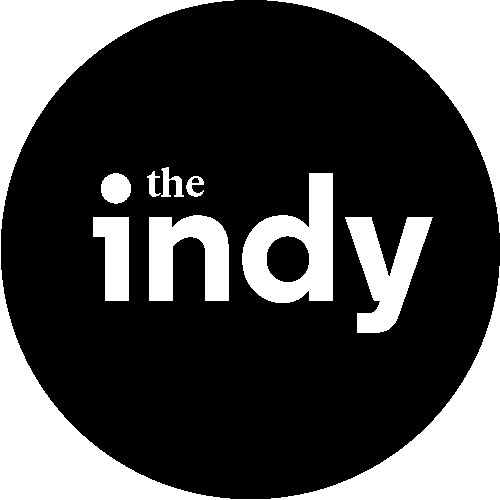

- Cover of The College Hill Independent, Volume 32, Issue No. 4.
- Type: Weekly student newspaper
- Format: Newsmagazine
- Owner: Independent
- Founder: David Rohde
- Founded: 1990
- Language: English
- Country: United States headquarters = Providence, Rhode Island
- Circulation: 2,000
- Website: Official website

The College Hill Independent (commonly referred to as The Indy) is a weekly college newspaper published by students of Brown University and the Rhode Island School of Design, the two colleges in the College Hill neighborhood in Providence, Rhode Island. With a circulation of about 2,000, it is the largest weekly newspaper in Southern New England.

== History ==
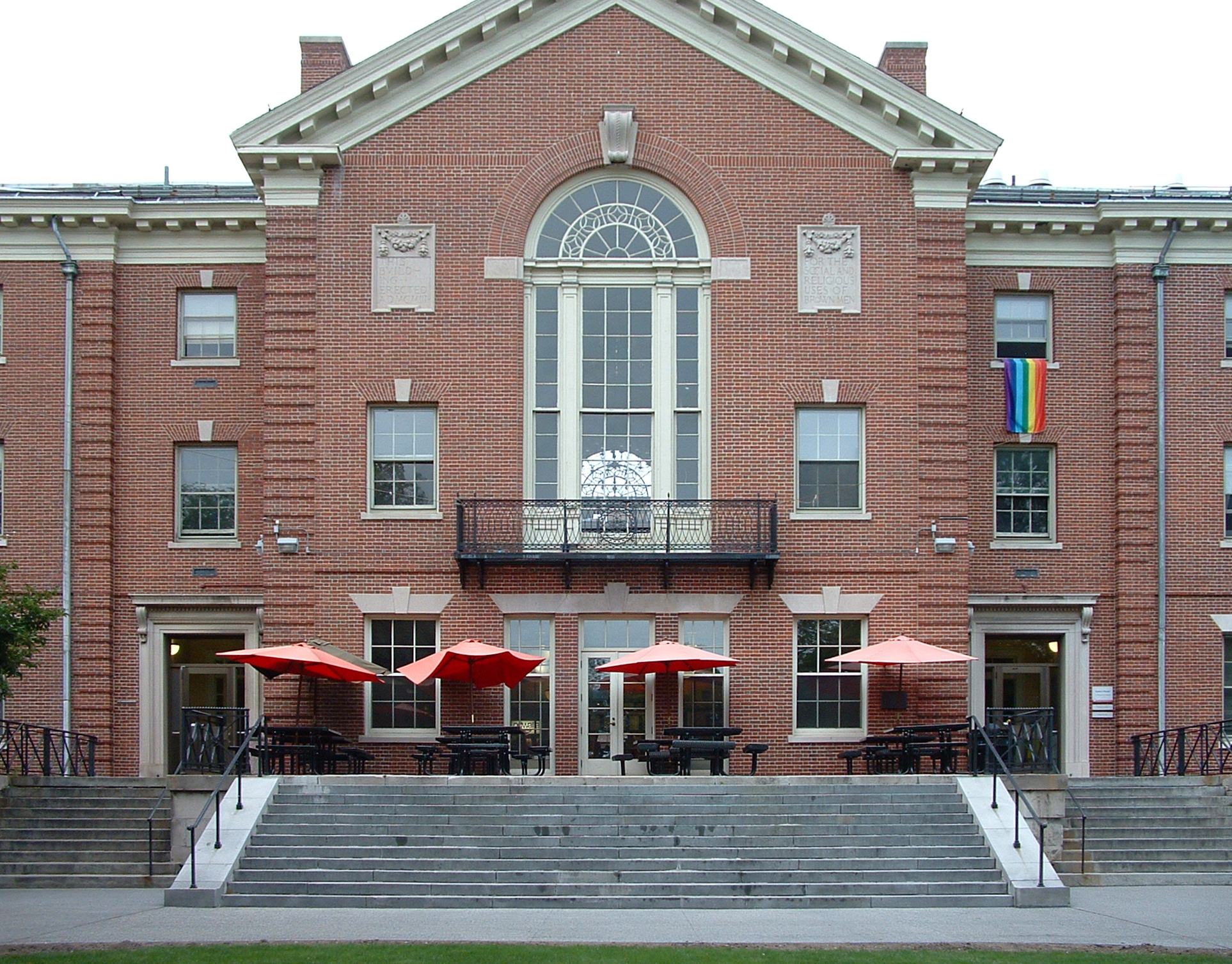
The Indy's editing headquarters are located in Brown University's Faunce House

The Indy published its first issue on February 1, 1990, in which its beginning was described: "Our newspaper started in November when five students met at The Gate. All had been thinking about starting a new paper for some time." The paper was decided to be "a workshop in putting together a newspaper for interested contributors, that it tie together trends that affect the Brown community, that it preview upcoming events as well as reviewing past events, and that it provide Brown students an opportunity to explore the environment outside their campus." The founding editors decided that in accordance with their last goal, they would eventually inquire about including Rhode Island School of Design students on their staff, to which the Rhode Island School of Design agreed. The newspaper became a project publication of the two schools on College Hill, Brown University and Rhode Island School of Design with a single staff composed of students from both schools.

Today, The College Hill Independent is an alternative weekly newspaper written, designed, and illustrated by Brown University and Rhode Island School of Design students for the College Hill and greater Providence community. Ten issues are published per semester on a weekly basis. New issues come out Friday mornings and are distributed around Providence. The Indy is printed in Seekonk, MA by TCI Press.

== Alumni ==
Notable alumni include:

- David Rohde B'90, Pulitzer Prize–winning journalist
- David Levithan B'94, author of Boy Meets Boy and Nick and Norah's Infinite Playlist
- MC Paul Barman B'96, rapper and producer of Paullelujah! and Thought Balloon Mushroom Cloud
- Michael Bhatia B'99, social scientist and author of War and Intervention
- Sasha Polakow-Suransky B'01, senior editor of Foreign Affairs and The New York Times
- Jessica Grose B'04, author of Sad Desk Salad and co-author of LOVE, MOM: Poignant, Goofy, Brilliant Messages from Home
- Sarah Kay B'11, poet
- Dayna Tortorici B'11.5, senior editor at n+1
- Cyrus Dunham B'14, writer
- Doreen St. Félix, B'14, staff writer at The New Yorker
