= Beside Myself (DJ Haram album) =

Studio album by DJ Haram
- Released: July 18, 2025
- Genre: Electronic
- Length: 42:55
- Label: Hyperdub

DJ Haram chronology
Handplay (2023)	Beside Myself (2025)	Critical Thot (2026)

Singles from Beside Myself
- 1. "Voyeur" Released: May 7, 2025

Beside Myself is the debut studio album by American DJ and record producer Zubeyda Muzeyyen under the pseudonym DJ Haram. It was released on July 18, 2025, through Hyperdub. It received universal acclaim from critics.

== Background ==
Zubeyda Muzeyyen, better known under the pseudonym DJ Haram, is an American DJ and record producer. She grew up in New Jersey, and is based in New York. She is a member of the duo 700 Bliss, along with Moor Mother.

Beside Myself is her debut solo album. It is her third solo release for Hyperdub, following the Grace EP (2019) and the Handplay EP (2023). The album includes contributions from Dakn, Aquiles Navarro, BbyMutha, Sha Ray, August Fanon, Moor Mother, Kayy Drizz, Armand Hammer, Abdul Hakim Bilal, Carmen Nebula, and El Kontessa. The voice of Nawal El Saadawi is used on the album's song "Badass". The album was released on July 18, 2025, through Hyperdub.

== Critical reception ==
Professional ratings
Aggregate scores
Source	Rating
Metacritic	84/100
Review scores
Source	Rating
Clash	8/10
Pitchfork	7.8/10
Spectrum Culture	60%

According to the review aggregator Metacritic, Beside Myself received "universal acclaim" based on a weighted average score of 84 out of 100 from 7 critic scores.

Tom Morgan of Clash described the album as "a visceral, sinister collection of shapeshifting club music that combines Middle Eastern instrumentation, Jersey club aggression and noise-flecked electronica to create a confrontational but relentlessly thrilling intoxicant." He added, "in spite of its threatening, intimidating moodscapes, it's stacked with exhilarating club bangers." Ben Cardew of Pitchfork commented that "Beside Myself is as twisted as life itself, an audacious mixture of Jersey club, rap, punk, heavy guitars, live percussion, and classical elegance, where anger, joy, and frustration come mushed up in tangles like classroom Play-Doh." He added, "Beside Myself is dramatic and daring, the agreeably messy sound of the kind of radical freedom that might not change our sinking world but can liberate the willing mind." Aydin Khalili of The Quietus stated, "With this cutting-edge cohort of collaborators, DJ Haram has delivered a debut worthy of an artist intent on tearing through the clichés that cling to both sound and identity – confronting the systems that colonise, both outwardly and within."

=== Accolades ===
Year-end lists for Beside Myself
Publication	List	Rank	Ref.
Clash	Albums of the Year 2025	53	
Crack	The Top 50 Albums of 2025	40	
DJ Mag	DJ Mag's Top Albums of 2025	—	
The Wire	Releases of the Year (2025 Rewind)	5	

== Track listing ==
Beside Myself track listing
No.	Title	Length
1.	"Walking Memory"	3:16
2.	"Remaining" (featuring Dakn and Aquiles Navarro)	4:14
3.	"Fishnets" (featuring BbyMutha, Sha Ray, and August Fanon)	3:00
4.	"Lifelike" (featuring Moor Mother)	3:09
5.	"Voyeur"	3:15
6.	"Do U Love Me" (featuring Kayy Drizz)	2:05
7.	"Stenography" (featuring Armand Hammer)	2:40
8.	"IDGAF"	3:52
9.	"Badass" (featuring Carmen Nebula)	1:42
10.	"Loneliness Epidemic"	2:54
11.	"Sahel" (featuring El Kontessa)	4:57
12.	"Distress Tolerance"	3:13
13.	"Who Needs Enemies When These Are Your Allies?"	2:01
14.	"Deep Breath (An Ending)"	2:37
Total length:		42:55

== Personnel ==
Credits adapted from liner notes.

- DJ Haram
- Sultana Garritano – skit (1), photography
- Dakn – guest appearance (2)
- Aquiles Navarro – guest appearance (2)
- BbyMutha – guest appearance (3)
- Sha Ray – guest appearance (3), violin (8)
- August Fanon – guest appearance (3)
- Saydah Ruz – violin (3)
- The Legendary Lady J – sample (3)
- Moor Mother – guest appearance (4)
- Kayy Drizz – guest appearance (6)
- Armand Hammer – guest appearance (7)
- Dania – vocals (7)
- Abdul Hakim Bilal – guitar (8)
- Carmen Nebula – guest appearance (9)
- El Kontessa – guest appearance (11)
- Archangel – quote (13)
- Kevin Keenan – mixing (1–8, 10–14)
- Ase Manual – mixing (9)
- Manuel Sepulveda – design
- Wendy Timana – photo retouching
- Shams Hanieh – liner notes

== Charts ==
Chart performance for Beside Myself
Chart (2025)	Peak position
UK Album Downloads (Official Charts)	70
