= Thought Balloon Mushroom Cloud =

Studio album by MC Paul Barman
- Released: November 24, 2009
- Genre: Hip-hop
- Length: 63:40
- Label: Househusband
- Producer: ?uestlove; James Poyser; MF Doom; Memory Man; Casual-T; Jean-Michel Bernard; Prince Paul; DJ Pocket; Phofo; Michel Gondry; Mofo Snot; Max Anomalous; MC Paul Barman; The JBeez

MC Paul Barman chronology
Paullelujah! (2002)	Thought Balloon Mushroom Cloud (2009)	Echo Chamber (2018)

Professional ratings
Review scores
Source	Rating
Boston Phoenix	3.5/4 stars
Robert Christgau	A−
Washington City Paper	favorable

Thought Balloon Mushroom Cloud is the second studio album by American hip-hop musician MC Paul Barman. It was released in 2009.

== Track listing ==
No.	Title	Producer(s)	Length
1.	"Props"	?uestlove; James Poyser	3:20
2.	"Go Sane"	MF Doom	2:24
3.	"Hairy Moth Owl"	Memory Man	3:25
4.	"The Moon" (featuring Masta Ace, Del the Funky Homosapien, and C-Rayz Walz)	Memory Man	4:56
5.	"Owl Pellets"	Memory Man	2:00
6.	"Allahu Akbar"	Casual-T	3:52
7.	"Losing a Puppy" (featuring Kimiko Ono-Bernard)	Jean-Michel Bernard	1:52
8.	"Get Along Song"	Prince Paul	2:59
9.	"Lidgeon"	DJ Pocket; Phofo; Michel Gondry	3:09
10.	"Back on a White Horse"	Memory Man	2:14
11.	"Science" (featuring The Old Codger)	Memory Man	2:25
12.	"Hot Guacamole" (featuring MF Doom)	Prince Paul	1:44
13.	"Power"	Memory Man	3:48
14.	"Sampling Law"	Mofo Snot	1:47
15.	"For Skins"		0:25
16.	"Circumcision" (featuring Warm DJ Orange Alert)	Memory Man	4:01
17.	"A.I.D.S." (featuring Dr. Joyce Wallace)	Memory Man; Max Anomalous	2:40
18.	"Get Help"	MC Paul Barman; The JBeez	1:51
19.	"Drug Casual-T"	Memory Man	3:12
20.	"Ask Your Mama"	Casual-T	3:53
21.	"Divorce"	Michel Gondry	3:41
22.	"It Can All Be Taken Away"	Michel Gondry	3:32
