= Spa 700 =

EP by 700 Bliss
- Released: February 23, 2018
- Genre: Experimental
- Length: 13:49
- Labels: Don Giovanni; Halcyon Veil
- Producer: DJ Haram

700 Bliss chronology
Spa 700 (2018)	Nothing to Declare (2022)

Spa 700 is the debut EP by 700 Bliss, an American duo consisting of Moor Mother and DJ Haram. It was released on February 23, 2018, through Don Giovanni Records and Halcyon Veil.

== Background ==
700 Bliss consists of Camae Ayewa, better known as Moor Mother, and Zubeyda Muzeyyen, better known as DJ Haram. After DJ Haram moved to Philadelphia in 2012, they met there and started collaboration. Spa 700 is the duo's debut EP. It contains five tracks: "Basic", "Cosmic Slop", "Ring the Alarm", "Living", and "Scully". The EP was released on February 23, 2018, through Don Giovanni Records and Halcyon Veil. A music video was released for "Cosmic Slop".

== Critical reception ==
Professional ratings
Review scores
Source	Rating
Crack	8/10
Resident Advisor	4.2/5
Tiny Mix Tapes	4/5 stars

Max Pearl of Resident Advisor wrote, "Their debut EP, Spa 700, is seething and wrathful, pairing hardcore poetry with raw, lean instrumentals." Ruth Saxelby of Pitchfork described the EP as "a collection of tracks that locate Moor Mother's scathing critique of anti-blackness amid DJ Haram's sharp-footed production." She added, "Ominous bass, glacial tones, and intricate percussion circle Spa 700's take-no-prisoners poetry in a riot of texture and context."

=== Accolades ===
Year-end lists for Spa 700
Publication	List	Rank	Ref.
NPR Music	The 50 Best Albums of 2018	47	
Pitchfork	The Best Experimental Albums of 2018	—	
The Quietus	Quietus Albums of the Year 2018	42	

== Track listing ==
Spa 700 track listing
No.	Title	Length
1.	"Basic"	2:20
2.	"Cosmic Slop"	3:28
3.	"Ring the Alarm"	2:20
4.	"Living"	3:00
5.	"Scully"	2:40
Total length:		13:49

== Personnel ==
Credits adapted from liner notes.

- Moor Mother – vocals
- DJ Haram – production
- Hprism – mixing
- Ase Manual – mastering
