= Open the Gate =

Open the Gate(s) may refer to:

== Media ==
- Open the Gates, a 1985 album by Manilla Road
- Open the Gates (Irreversible Entanglements album), 2021
- "Open the Gate", a song by No Doubt from The Beacon Street Collection, 1995
- "Open the Gate", a song by Zach Bryan from American Heartbreak, 2022

== See also ==
- Gate (disambiguation)
