= Circuit City (album) =

Studio album by Moor Mother
- Released: September 25, 2020
- Genres: Free jazz; spoken word
- Length: 41:23
- Label: Don Giovanni

Moor Mother chronology
True Opera (2020)	Circuit City (2020)	Brass (2020)

Circuit City is a studio album by American musician and poet Camae Ayewa, released under her alias Moor Mother. It was released on September 25, 2020, through Don Giovanni Records. Composed as a recorded soundtrack for the 2019 stage production of the same name by Ayewa, the album features contributions from the free jazz collective Irreversible Entanglements and the Circuit City Band. Lyrically, the album deals with housing inequality, private ownership and institutional racism.

The album was accompanied by a short film for the track "Act 1 - Working Machine", as well as by an essay by writer Rasheedah Phillips.

== Critical reception ==
Professional ratings
Review scores
Source	Rating
AllMusic	4/5 stars
Clash	8/10
Pitchfork	7.4/10

AllMusic critic Fred Thomas praised the record, stating: "Unflinching and raw in both its sociopolitical content and musical counterpart, Circuit City is bluntly powerful." Thomas further added: "Historically, some of the most inspired moments of free jazz were righteous responses to various forms of oppression faced by black communities, and Circuit City cements Moor Mother's voice in that lineage." Alec Holt of Clash thought that the record "carries its narrative intensity consummately from the stage to album format and represents the most conceptually accomplished project of 2020 from one of our era’s most urgent voices." Writing for Pitchfork, Andy Beta stated: "Putting avant-garde tactics to humanist ends, [Ayewa's] album is a powerful indictment of a vicious, racist cycle that needs to be broken."

== Track listing ==
1. "Act 1 - Working Machine" — 11:02
2. "Act 2 - Circuit Break" — 8:40
3. "Act 3 - "Time of No Time" (feat. Elon Battle)" — 9:00
4. "Act 4 - No More Wires" — 12:41

== Personnel ==
Album personnel as adapted from Bandcamp liner notes.

- Camae Ayewa — lead performer, sound designer
- Taryn Jones — scenic designer
- Kae Greenberg — lighting designer, production manager
- Ada Adhiyatma — sound designer, electronics, mixing
- Elon Battle — vocals
- Steve Montenegro — electronics
- Luke Stewart — upright bass
- Keir Neuringer — saxophone, percussion
- Tcheser Holmes — drums, percussion
- Aquiles Navarro — trumpet, percussion
- Alex Nagle — mastering
- Bob Sweeney — photography
- Rasheedah Phillips — cover
