= Beside Myself =

Beside Myself may refer to:

== Music ==
- Beside Myself (Basement album), a 2018 album by Basement
- Beside Myself (DJ Haram album), a 2025 album by DJ Haram
- Beside Myself (Ray Stevens album), a 1989 album by Ray Stevens
- "Beside Myself", a song by Art Farmer from The Company I Keep
- "Beside Myself", a song by Earshot from The Silver Lining
- "Beside Myself", a song by Jethro Tull from Roots to Branches
- "Beside Myself", a song by Lights from Pep
- "Beside Myself", a song by Lower Than Atlantis from World Record
- "Beside Myself", a song by Don McLean from Addicted to Black
