= Doreen St. Félix =

Haitian-American writer (born 1992)

- Born: 1992 (age 33–34)
- Occupation: Writer

Doreen St. Félix (born 1992) is a Haitian-American writer. She is a staff writer for The New Yorker and was formerly editor-at-large for Lenny Letter, a newsletter from Lena Dunham and Jenni Konner.

== Early life ==
St. Félix was born in Canarsie, Brooklyn to Haitian parents. She attended Brown University, where she edited the weekly newspaper, The College Hill Independent. She graduated in 2014.

== Career ==
St. Félix has written for The New York Times Magazine and Pitchfork, as well as serving as an editor for Lena Dunham and Jenni Konner's newsletter, Lenny Letter. St. Félix currently writes for The New Yorker.

=== Critical reception and honors ===
Brooklyn Magazine named St. Félix to its 2016 list of the "100 Most Influential People in Brooklyn Culture", calling her Pitchfork essay on Rihanna "definitive". The Huffington Post named the same essay to its list of "The Most Important Writing From People Of Color In 2015", NPR called it "excellent" and Paper Magazine described it as "the best damn thing ever written" about Rihanna.

The British magazine i-D has called her "a guiding voice in the worlds of writing, art and activism." In 2016, Forbes Magazine named St. Félix to its 30 Under 30 list, citing her work on the Lenny Letter launch, with the newsletter reaching 400,000 subscribers in under six months. St. Félix was a finalist for the National Magazine Award in Columns and Commentary in 2017 for her writing at MTV News. She won in the same category in 2019.

In 2025 St. Félix faced criticism from conservatives over resurfaced social media posts on the subject of race she had made between 2014 and 2016.

=== Other projects ===
St. Félix co-hosted a podcast at MTV News with Ira Madison III called Speed Dial with Ira and Doreen, focused on music, pop culture, sex and race.

== Personal life ==
St. Félix lives in Brooklyn, New York.

== Bibliography ==
=== Essays and reporting ===
- "Ratology". The Talk of the Town. Dept. of Experts. The New Yorker. 91 (37): 36, 38. November 23, 2015.
- "Hot messes : 'The Flight Attendant,' on HBO Max, and 'Bridgerton,' on Netflix". The Critics. On Television. The New Yorker. 96 (43): 84–85. January 4–11, 2021. (Note: Online version is titled "A hot mess caught in a caper in 'The Flight Attendant'".)
- "Tasteless : 'The Real Housewives of Salt Lake City,' on Bravo". The Critics. On Television. The New Yorker. 97 (1): 92–93. February 15–22, 2021. (Note: Online version is titled "'The Real Housewives of Salt Lake City' is culturally sensitive trash".)
- "Children's hour : 'Waffles + Mochi' and 'City of Ghosts,' on Netflix". The Critics. On Television. The New Yorker. 97 (7): 68–69. April 5, 2021. (Note: Online version is titled "Michelle Obama's lesson to kids : you are what you watch".)
- "Fallout : 'NYC Epicenters 9/11 → 2021 1/2'". The Critics. On Television. The New Yorker. 97 (28): 78–79. September 13, 2021. (Note: Online version is titled "The messy introspection of Spike Lee's 'NYC Epicenters'".)
- "Terra nova : 'Reservation Dogs,' on FX on Hulu; 'Only Murders in the Building,' on Hulu". The Critics. On Television. The New Yorker. 97 (30): 88–89. September 27, 2021. (Note: Online version is titled "'Reservation Dogs' is a near-perfect study of dispossession".)
- "Off season : 'The Resort,' on Peacock". The Critics. On Television. The New Yorker. 98 (25): 70–71. August 22, 2022. (Note: Online version is titled "'The Resort' needs to relax".)

=== Columns from newyorker.com ===
- "Amnesty in Brooklyn". The New Yorker. July 27, 2015.
- "Trump's fixation on Haiti, and the abiding fear of black self-determination". The New Yorker. January 12, 2018.
- "The magical thinking of 'the Goop Lab'". The New Yorker. February 3, 2020.
- "The embarrassment of Democrats wearing kente-cloth stoles". On and Off the Avenue. The New Yorker. June 9, 2020.

———————

Bibliography notes
