= Dayna Tortorici =

American writer (born 1989)

- Born: 1989 (age 36–37); United States
- Education: Brown University
- Occupations: Writer, editor of n+1
- Writing career
- Period: 2012–present

Dayna Tortorici (born 1989) is an American writer. As of 2016, she is the co-editor of the literary magazine n+1.

== Career ==
After graduating from Brown University in 2011, where she wrote for The College Hill Independent, Tortorici joined n+1 as a staff writer and eventually an editor. In addition to her work on the magazine, she co-edited the n+1 essay collection What Was the Hipster?: A Sociological Investigation and edited No Regrets, a 2013 n+1 book in which 13 women discuss literature.
