= Paper Cut from the Obit =

2023 studio album by Celestaphone

Paper Cut From the Obit

Studio album by Celestaphone
- Released: February 17, 2023
- Genre: Experimental hip-hop; jazz rap; instrumental hip-hop
- Length: 43:13
- Label: Drumhex
- Producer: Celestaphone

Celestaphone chronology
A Year of Octobers (2021)	Paper Cut From the Obit (2023)

Paper Cut From the Obit is a studio album by American musician Celestaphone. It was released on February 17, 2023, through Drumhex. The release features sole production by Celestaphone and includes guest appearances from Armand Hammer, Defcee, MC Paul Barman, Moor Mother and R.A.P. Ferreira.

== Critical reception ==
Professional ratings
Review scores
Source	Rating
Focus Hip Hop	93/100
Livore	8/10
Ondarock	7/10

Francesco Nunziata of Ondarock gave the album a 7 out of 10, writing:

Impreziosito da una produzione tanto densa quanto minuziosa nel dare il giusto peso a ogni singola tessera del puzzle, "Paper Cut From The Obit" è il classico disco che unisce al piacere dell'ascolto (munirsi di cuffie, please!) le delizie dell'indagine microscopica,

—Francesco Nunziata: Ondarock
Celestaphone - Paper Cut From The Obit :: Le Recensioni di OndaRock
Translation:

Enriched by a production as dense as it is meticulous in giving the right emphasis to each puzzle piece, "Paper Cut From The Obit" is the classic album that combines listening pleasure (wear headphones, please!) with the delight of microscopic exploration.

He said of Celestaphone's rapping, it's "metà strada tra la declamazione di un profeta su di giri e il ghigno sardonico di uno che ne ha viste tante, prima di decidere che la cosa migliore da fare è raccontare, non agire." (English translation: "halfway between the declamation of an amped-up prophet and the sardonic grin of someone who's seen it all before deciding it's best to narrate, not act.")

OG Nick Marsh from Focus Hip Hop, giving the album a 93 out of 100, said "This album is amazing. I think this is the best project I’ve heard from Celestaphone, which is saying a lot." and added "The production from Celestaphone is absolutely spectacular, and the lyricism is stunning as well." Alessandro Corona of Livore gave the album an 8 out of 10 and wrote "Spinto fino ai limiti massimi della sua poetica, Murphy si è ritrovato a tagliare e castigare tutte le sue influenze e a dare un’effettiva take metamoderna, iperrealistica, tongue-in-cheek sul passato, sul presente e sul futuro della musica toccata dal producer. Tutte le incertezze di scrittura colano nel campo estetico della bellezza imperfetta da outsider;" (English translation: "Pushed to the utmost limits of his poetics, Murphy found himself cutting and chastising all of his influences and giving a truly metamodern, hyperrealistic, tongue-in-cheek take on the past, present, and future of the music touched by the producer. All the uncertainties of writing seep into the aesthetic field of imperfect beauty from an outsider.")

== Track listing ==
All tracks written by Joseph Murphy except where noted; all tracks produced by Celestaphone.

No.	Title	Writer(s)	Length
1.	"Erfurt Latrine"		3:04
2.	"Jettatura"		2:26
3.	"Small World"		3:05
4.	"Day"		2:02
5.	"AM PM"		3:25
6.	"Roof"		1:09
7.	"Tops Turvy"		2:41
8.	"NEET Daughter"		2:54
9.	"Gravid Patch" (featuring Defcee and R.A.P. Ferreira)	Murphy; Defcee; R.A.P. Ferreira	3:00
10.	"Mantindane"		2:44
11.	"Nay"		2:35
12.	"Paintings of Panspermia"		2:11
13.	"They All Con It"		2:38
14.	"Chitauri Chip"		2:41
15.	"Tithes" (featuring Armand Hammer and Moor Mother)	Murphy; Elucid; Moor Mother; Billy Woods	4:08
16.	"Babies" (featuring MC Paul Barman)	Murphy; Paul Barman	2:22
Total length:			43:13

== Personnel ==
Credits for Paper Cut From the Obit adapted from Bandcamp.

- Celestaphone – lead vocals, producer, mixing, mastering, turntable, keyboards
- Alicia Cellini Fettering – art
- Alex Haught – layoutist
- Armand Hammer – featured artist
- Defcee – featured artist
- MC Paul Barman – featured artist
- Moor Mother – featured artist
- R.A.P. Ferreira – featured artist
