= Echo Chamber (MC Paul Barman album) =

Studio album by MC Paul Barman
- Released: May 18, 2018
- Genre: Hip-hop
- Length: 48:13
- Label: Mello Music Group
- Producer: James Poyser; Kenny Segal; Mark Ronson; Memory Man; MF Doom; Prince Paul; Questlove

MC Paul Barman chronology
Thought Balloon Mushroom Cloud (2009)	Echo Chamber (2018)	Tectonic Texts (2025)

Echo Chamber (stylized as (((echo chamber)))) is the third solo studio album by American rapper MC Paul Barman. It was released on May 18, 2018, via Mello Music Group. Production was handled by Questlove, Memory Man, MF Doom, James Poyser, Kenny Segal, Mark Ronson and Prince Paul. It features guest appearances from Open Mike Eagle and Masta Ace.

== Critical reception ==
Professional ratings
Aggregate scores
Source	Rating
AnyDecentMusic?	6.7/10
Review scores
Source	Rating
AllMusic	3.5/5 stars
Exclaim!	8/10
Pitchfork	6/10
Rolling Stone	3/5 stars
The Irish Times	4/5 stars
Tom Hull	B+

(((echo chamber))) was met with generally favorable reviews from music critics. At AnyDecentMusic?, which assigns a normalized rating out of 10 to reviews from mainstream publications, the album received an average score of 6.7, based on six reviews.

== Track listing ==
All tracks are written by Paul Nathaniel Barman, except tracks 1 and 4 written with Michael W. Eagle II, and track 16 written with Duval Clear.

No.	Title	Producer(s)	Length
1.	"Echo Chamber" (featuring Open Mike Eagle)	?uestlove	2:28
2.	"Youngman Speaks on Race"	Prince Paul	3:26
3.	"99.99999%"	MF Doom	4:16
4.	"Believe That" (featuring Open Mike Eagle)	MF Doom	3:12
5.	"Being Poor"	?uestlove; James Poyser	1:40
6.	"Art of War"	?uestlove	2:03
7.	"Tourette's"	Memory Man	1:41
8.	"Commandments"	Memory Man	2:48
9.	"Happy Holidays"	Mark Ronson	1:28
10.	"Oh Snap"	?uestlove	1:29
11.	"Meat n Bone"	?uestlove	6:21
12.	"Leapfrog"	Memory Man	2:43
13.	"Hairy Moth Owl 2"	Memory Man	2:55
14.	"Undoing Aloneness"	Kenny Segal	2:52
15.	"Age War"	?uestlove	3:54
16.	"Antennas" (featuring Masta Ace)	Memory Man	4:57
Total length:			48:13

== Personnel ==
- MC Paul Barman – vocals
- Michael "Open Mike Eagle" Eagle – vocals & recording (tracks: 1, 4)
- Duval "Masta Ace" Clear – vocals & recording (track 16)
- Ahmir "?uestlove" Thompson – producer (tracks: 1, 5, 6, 10, 11, 15)
- "Prince Paul" Huston – producer (track 2)
- Daniel "MF Doom" Dumile – producer (tracks: 3, 4)
- James Poyser – producer (track 5)
- Eli "Memory Man" Elkin – producer (tracks: 7, 8, 12, 13, 16), mixing
- Mark Ronson – producer (track 9), recording (track 8)
- Kenny "Syndakit" Segal – producer (track 14)
- Joseph "Steel Tipped Dove" Fusaro – recording (tracks: 1, 3–5, 9, 10, 12, 15, 16)
- Joshua Sadlier-Brown – recording (tracks: 2, 11, 14–16)
- Casual-T – recording (track 7)
- Chris Pummill – recording (track 11)
- Mark Donahue – mastering
