= Luke Stewart (musician) =

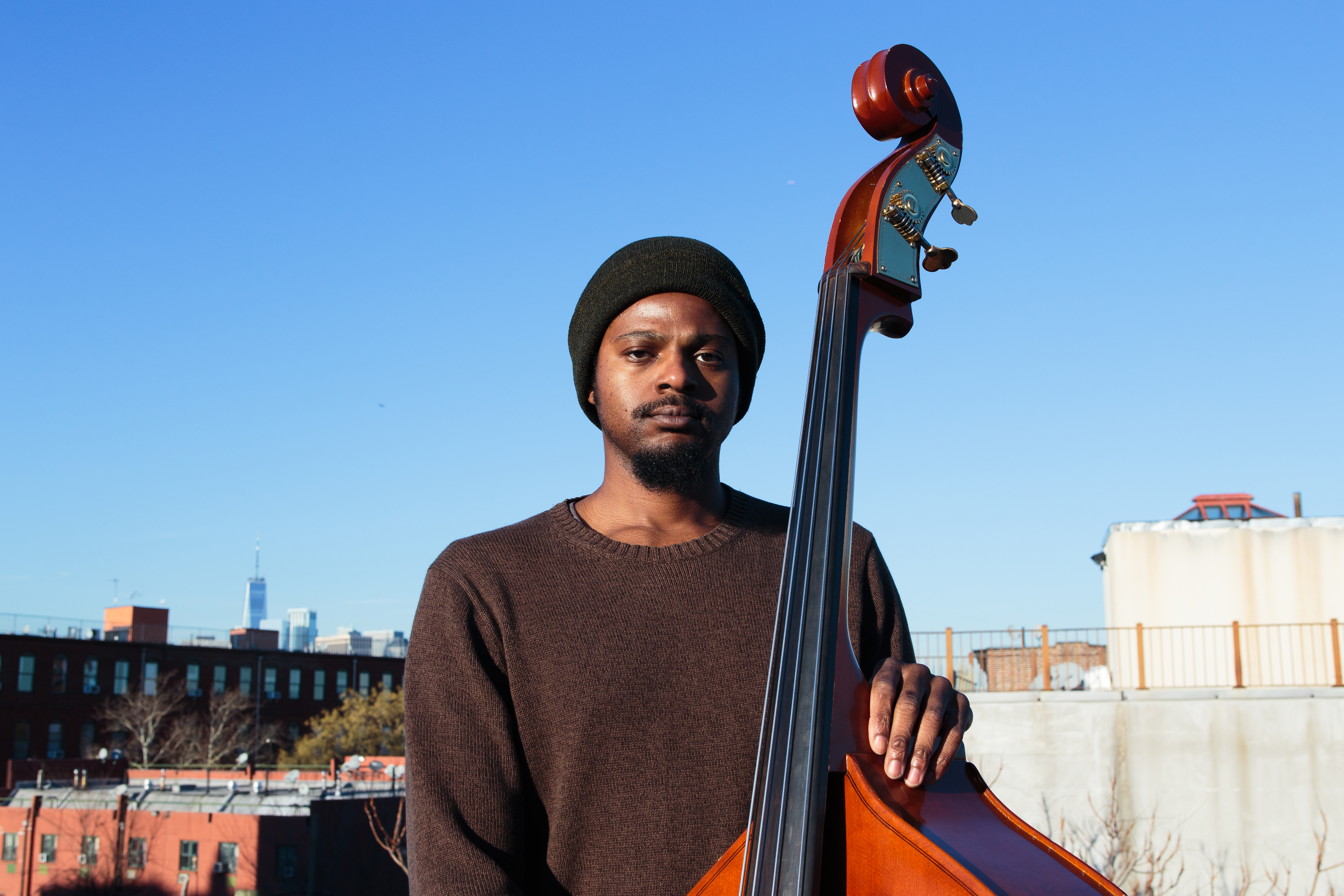
- Luke Stewart in Red Hook, Brooklyn.

Background information
- Born: Ocean Springs, Mississippi
- Genres: experimental, free jazz, avant-garde jazz, free improvisation, post-rock, noise, art punk
- Occupations: composer, improviser, bassist, multi-instrumentalist
- Instruments: Double bass, bass guitar, alto saxophone
- Labels: Astral Spirits, International Anthem, Atlantic Rhythms
- Member of: Irreversible Entanglements; Blacks' Myths; Luke Stewart Exposure Quintet; Heart of the Ghost; Six Six; Heroes Are Gang Leaders
- Website: thelukestewart.com

Luke Stewart is a composer-improviser, bassist, multi-instrumentalist, and organizer known for his work as a soloist; leader of his Exposure Quintet, with Edward Wilkerson, Jr., Ken Vandermark, Jim Baker, and Avreeayl Ra; and member of groups including Blacks' Myths, Heart of the Ghost, Six Six, Irreversible Entanglements, and Heroes Are Gang Leaders, a literary free jazz ensemble that was awarded the 2018 American Book Award for Oral Literature.

Stewart has co-run DC jazz advocacy nonprofit CapitalBop since 2010, curating the organization's longstanding "Loft Jazz" concert series and writing music criticism for its website.

In 2020, he was included among DownBeat's "25 for the Future" as an artist who "shapes the artistic landscape".

He has performed or recorded with artists including Camae Ayewa, Keir Neuringer, Aquiles Navarro, Tcheser Holmes, Archie Shepp, Warren "Trae" Crudup, III, Miriam Parker, Daniel Carter, Fay Victor, Hamiet Bluiett, Wadada Leo Smith, Jarrett Gilgore, Ian McColm, Anthony Pirog, Jaimie Branch, Thurston Moore, Leila Bordreuil, and Priests.

== Early life and career ==
Stewart grew up in Ocean Springs, Mississippi, where he studied saxophone, violin, and guitar before he began playing electric bass in high school. Stewart began his undergraduate degree as an international studies major at the University of Mississippi. In 2005, as he prepared to begin an internship at the National Coalition to Abolish the Death Penalty in Washington, D.C., Hurricane Katrina hit the Mississippi Gulf Coast. Stewart decided to stay in D.C. and transferred to American University, where his studies expanded to include audio engineering. In addition to his bachelor's from American, Stewart completed a master's in Arts Management and Entrepreneurship at The New School in 2019.

After moving to D.C., Stewart began frequently attending and performing at avant-garde jazz and rock gigs. He also interned at "Jazz and Justice" radio station WPFW, eventually hosting his own weekly jazz radio show and working as a production coordinator.

In 2010, Stewart met Giovanni Russonello, who had recently founded jazz advocacy organization and website CapitalBop. Stewart began writing for and then co-running the organization, which was awarded a $100,000 grant from the Doris Duke Charitable Foundation in 2019.

Stewart met Camae Ayewa (also known as Moor Mother) while playing with Laughing Man, an art-punk band that shared bills with Ayewa's group the Mighty Paradocs. One year after the 2014 "People Issue" of the Washington City Paper called Stewart a "jazz revolutionary", he joined Ayewa, Keir Neuringer, Aquiles Navarro, and Tcheser Holmes in forming the "liberation-oriented free-jazz collective" Irreversible Entanglements. The group performed in the inaugural season of the Kennedy Center's "Direct Current" contemporary culture showcase, and their releases have been included in best-of lists in Magnet, NPR Music, The Quietus, and Stereogum's "20 Best Jazz Albums Of The 2010s".

Stewart has said he wants his collaborative work to "highlight the non-hierarchical nature of free improvisational music" and to challenge "the concept of the capital-C composer and how it affects our perceptions of music".

In 2021, he was a Resident Composer at Pioneer Works in Brooklyn.

== Discography ==
=== As leader / co-leader ===
Release year	Artist	Title	Label	Personnel
2013	Trio OOO	Live for Trayvon		Aaron Martin, Sam Lohman, Stewart
2015	Trio OOO	Days To Be Told	New Atlantis	Martin, Lohman, Stewart
2017	Irreversible Entanglements	Irreversible Entanglements	International Anthem / Don Giovanni	Camae Ayewa, Keir Neuringer, Aquiles Navarro, Stewart, Tcheser Holmes
2018	Blacks' Myths	Blacks' Myths	Atlantic Rhythms	Stewart, Warren "Trae" Crudup, III
2018	Heart Of The Ghost	Heart Of The Ghost	Pidgeon	Jarrett Gilgore, Stewart, Ian McColm
2018	Luke Stewart	Works for Upright Bass and Amplifier	Astral Spirits	Stewart
2019	Blacks' Myths	Blacks' Myths II	Atlantic Rhythms	Stewart, Crudup, Dr. Thomas "Bushmeat" Stanley, Cedar and Lu
2019	Heart of the Ghost	Heart of the Ghost II	Dagoretti	Gilgore, Stewart, McColm
2019	Heart of the Ghost	Live In Chicago	Catalytic Sound	Gilgore, Stewart, McColm
2020	Irreversible Entanglements	Who Sent You?	International Anthem / Don Giovanni	Ayewa, Neuringer, Navarro, Stewart, Holmes
2020	Luke Stewart, Brian Settles, Warren "Trae" Crudup, III	No Treaspassing		Stewart, Settles, Crudup
2020	Six Six	Six Six	Atlantic Rhythms	Anthony Pirog, Stewart
2020	Irreversible Entanglements	Live in Italy		Ayewa, Neuringer, Navarro, Stewart, Holmes
2020	Heart of the Ghost	Live in Detroit	Dagoretti	Gilgore, Stewart, McColm
2020	Irreversible Entanglements	Live in Berlin		Ayewa, Neuringer, Navarro, Stewart, Holmes
2020	Heart of the Ghost with Dave Ballou	Live at Rhizome	Dagoretti / Bulb	Gilgore, Stewart, McColm, Ballou
2020	Luke Stewart & Tashi Dorji	Phases		Stewart, Tashi Dorji
2020	Luke Stewart	Gaps		Stewart
2020	Luke Stewart Exposure Quintet	Luke Stewart Exposure Quintet	Astral Spirits	Stewart, Edward Wilkerson, Jr., Ken Vandermark, Jim Baker, Avreeayl Ra
2021	Luke Stewart / Patrick Shiroishi	Luke Stewart / Patrick Shiroishi	Profane Illuminations	Stewart, Shiroishi
2021	!MOFAYA!	Like One Long Dream	Trost Records	jaimie branch, John Dikeman, Stewart, Aleksandar Škorić
2021	Irreversible Entanglements	Open the Gates	International Anthem / Don Giovanni	Ayewa, Neuringer, Navarro, Stewart, Holmes
2022	Luke Stewart's Silt Trio	The Bottom	Cuneiform Records	L Stewart, B Settles, C Taylor
2024	Luke Stewart Silt Trio	Unknown Rivers	Pi Recordings	Luke Stewart, Brian Settles, Trae Crudup, Chad Taylor

=== As sideperson ===
Release year	Artist	Title	Label
2010	Laughing Man	The Lovings	Sockets Records
2014	Laughing Man	Be Black Baby	Bad Friend / BLIGHT
2015	Ross Hammond	Mean Crow	Prescott Records
2016	James Brandon Lewis Trio	No Filter	BNS Sessions
2017	Priests	Nothing Feels Natural	Sister Polygon Records
2017	Heroes Are Gang Leaders	The Avant-Age Garde I Ams Of The Gal Luxury	Fast Speaking Music
2018	William Hooker	Pillars... At the Portal	Mulatta Records
2019	James Brandon Lewis	An UnRuly Manifesto	Relative Pitch
2019	Brahja	Brahja	RR Gems
2019	J. R. Bohannon	Dusk	Figureight
2020	Elliott Levin Trio with Chad Taylor and Luke Stewart	Tin - Tabu - Latin' - Rhyth - Hymn	
2020	Archie Shepp, Raw Poetic, & Damu the Fudgemunk	Ocean Bridges	Redefinition Records
2020	Heroes Are Gang Leaders	Artificial Happiness Button	Ropeadope Records
2020	Moor Mother	Circuit City	Don Giovanni Records
2020	Anthony Pirog	Terry Riley's In C	Sonic Mass
2021	Bob Bellerue	Radioactive Desire	Elevator Bath
