= Analog Fluids of Sonic Black Holes =

Studio album by Moor Mother
- Released: November 8, 2019
- Length: 34:52
- Label: Don Giovanni
- Producers: Moor Mother; Mental Jewelry; Justin Broadrick; King Britt; Bookworms; Giant Swan; Abstract Black

Moor Mother chronology
The Motionless Present (2017)	Analog Fluids of Sonic Black Holes (2019)	True Opera (2020)

Analog Fluids of Sonic Black Holes is the third studio album by American musician Moor Mother. It was released on November 8, 2019, under Don Giovanni Records.

The first single "After Images", a collaboration with Justin Broadrick from Godflesh, was released on August 27, 2019.

== Critical reception ==
Professional ratings
Aggregate scores
Source	Rating
Metacritic	82/100
Review scores
Source	Rating
Clash	9/10
Exclaim!	6/10
The Guardian	4/5 stars
Pitchfork	7.7/10

Analog Fluids of Sonic Black Holes was met with universal acclaim reviews from critics. At Metacritic, which assigns a weighted average rating out of 100 to reviews from mainstream publications, this release received an average score of 82, based on 8 reviews.

=== Accolades ===
Publication	Accolade	Rank	Ref.
Clash	Top 40 Albums of 2019	31	
DJ Mag	Top 50 Albums of 2019	26	
The Key	Top 15 Albums of 2019	12	
Norman Records	Top 50 Albums of 2019	15	
The Quietus	Top 100 Albums of 2019	12	
The Wire	Top 50 Albums of 2019	4	

== Track listing ==
All tracks are written and produced by Camae Ayewa, with additional writers and producers noted.

No.	Title	Lyrics	Producers(s)	Length
1.	"Repeater"		Mental Jewelry	4:34
2.	"Don't Die"			1:57
3.	"After Images"		Justin Broadrick	2:48
4.	"Engineered Uncertainty"			1:00
5.	"Master's Clock"			1:19
6.	"Black Flight" (featuring Saul Williams)	Williams	King Britt	2:49
7.	"The Myth Hold Weight"		Britt	3:58
8.	"Sonic Black Holes"			1:07
9.	"LA92"			1:35
10.	"Shadowgrams"		Bookworms; Mental Jewelry	4:08
11.	"Private Silence" (featuring Reef the Lost Cauze)	Sharif Talib Lacey	Giant Swan	3:28
12.	"Cold Case"		Mental Jewelry	1:56
13.	"Passing of Time" (featuring Juçara Marçal)		Abstract Black	4:13
Total length:				34:52

== Personnel ==
- Moor Mother – vocals, lyrics, production
- Dali de Saint Paul – vocals (1)
- Saydah Ruz – violin (1, 10, 12)
- Saul Williams – vocals, lyrics (6)
- Zaynah Shaikh – vocals (9)
- Aquiles Navarro – trumpet (10)
- Hillaria Goodgame – vocals (10)
- Reef the Lost Cauze – vocals, lyrics (11)
- Emel Mathlouthi – vocals (12)
- Juçara Marçal – vocals (13)
- Mental Jewelry – production (1, 10, 12)
- Justin Broadrick – production (3)
- Bookworms – production (10)
- Giant Swan – production (11)
- Abstract Black – production (13)
- King Britt – mixing (6, 7), production (6, 7)
- Joe Baldacci – mixing (1–5, 8–13)
- Alex Nagle – mastering
