= Grace (EP) =

EP by DJ Haram
- Released: July 5, 2019
- Genre: Electronic
- Length: 27:08
- Label: Hyperdub

DJ Haram chronology
Mixed Berries (2019)	Grace (2019)	Era (2021)

Grace is an EP by American DJ and record producer Zubeyda Muzeyyen under the pseudonym DJ Haram. It was released on July 5, 2019, through Hyperdub.

== Background ==
Zubeyda Muzeyyen, better known under the pseudonym DJ Haram, is an American DJ and record producer. She is one half of 700 Bliss, along with Moor Mother.

Grace is a follow-up to her 2019 solo EP, Mixed Berries. It contains eight tracks. Each track on the EP is represented by a different character, taking inspiration from types of jinn in Islam and creatures born from her own imagination. Moor Mother provides vocals on the 700 Bliss remix of "Candle Light". The EP's cover art features an illustration by Samantha Garritano.

The EP was released on July 5, 2019, through Hyperdub.

== Critical reception ==
Professional ratings
Review scores
Source	Rating
Exclaim!	8/10
Pitchfork	7.5/10
Resident Advisor	4.1/5

Tom Beedham of Exclaim! wrote, "A hazy class in raw juxtaposition and club-tested disruption, Grace is an artful tapestry that threads together folkway traditions and late night club encounters." Max Pearl of Resident Advisor stated, "Grace is at times so focused and earth-shakingly forceful that it's a little intimidating." Ben Cardew of Pitchfork described the EP as "a record for star gazers, romantics and wanderers, a genuinely transportive work that flies from the mundane."

=== Accolades ===
Year-end lists for Grace
Publication	List	Rank	Ref.
Fact	The Best Albums of 2019	—	
Pitchfork	The Best Electronic Music of 2019	—	

== Track listing ==
Grace track listing
No.	Title	Length
1.	"No Idol"	3:38
2.	"Interlude"	2:11
3.	"Gemini Rising"	4:07
4.	"Body Count"	3:44
5.	"Candle Light" (700 Bliss remix)	3:42
6.	"Grace (K.O.D.)"	3:40
7.	"Candle Light" (instrumental)	3:41
8.	"No Idol" (remix)	2:36
Total length:		27:08

== Personnel ==
Credits adapted from liner notes.

- DJ Haram
- Moor Mother – vocals (on track 5)
- Samantha Garritano (Sultana Bambino) – artwork
