= Damu the Fudgemunk =

American hip hop producer from Washington D.C.

- Birth name: Earl Davis
- Born: June 8, 1984 (age 40)
- Origin: Washington, D.C., U.S.
- Genres: Hip hop; Underground hip-hop; Jazz-rap
- Occupations: Instrumentalist; record producer; rapper
- Instrument(s): Akai MPC 2000, drums, vibraphone
- Years active: 2007—present
- Labels: Tres Records; Redefinition Records; Def Pressé
- Website: damuthefudgemunk.bandcamp.com

Earl Davis (born June 8, 1984), known professionally as Damu the Fudgemunk, is an American hip-hop producer, multi-instrumentalist, DJ, and rapper from Washington, D.C. Damu is a member of the groups Y Society and Panacea, and he co-owns and operates Redefinition Records.

== Career ==
Davis was raised by two musician parents, and he began making beats in his teens. His official debut album was with Y Society, a duo project with rapper Insight; the record, Travel at Your Own Pace, was released by Tres Records in 2007. The album is reminiscent of true-school hip-hop with its liberal use of jazz, soul samples, and scratching. In 2008, Damu released two free albums primarily composed of instrumental music, titled Spare Time and Overtime. He developed a fan base through his YouTube videos and live street performances around Washington, DC, and New York City, using a portable electricity generator to power his sampler and speakers.

Damu co-owned and operated the vinyl/cassette-enthusiast label Redefinition Records, through which he also released the bulk of his own music.

In 2019, he collaborated with Raw Poetic and legendary jazz saxophonist Archie Shepp on the improvised album Ocean Bridges, which he released on his label the following year.

In January 2020, Damu was invited to visit the London KPM music library, renowned for a collection that has been sampled by artists including MF Doom and Jay-Z. Damu was the first artist to be featured on the Def Pressé/KPM Crate Diggers series, an initiative to release records extensively featuring samples from the library; his work with material from the archives resulted in the albums Conversation Peace and Peace of Action.

== Discography ==
- Spare Time (2008)
- Overtime (2008)
- ReVISIONS Madvillain (Damu vs Joe Buck) (2009)
- The Bright Side (2009)
- Same Beat Project EP (2009)
- Kilawatt: V1 (2009)
- How It Should Sound (Promo EP) (2010)
- How It Should Sound Volumes 1 & 2 (2010)
- Supply for Demand (2010)
- Brooklyn Flower (2010)
- More Supplies (2010)
- When Winter Comes / Truly Get Yours (2011)
- OverThrone (Try a Little Skillfulness) / All Green (2011)
- Faster Rhyme for Self (2011)
- Kilawatt V1.5 featuring Raw Poetic (2012)
- Spur Momento Trailer (2013)
- Public Assembly (2014)
- Public Assembly Vol.2 (2015)
- How It Should Sound Vol. 3, 4, and 5 (2015)
- HISS ABYSS (How It Should Sound) (2015)
- Untitled Vols. 1 & 2 (2016)
- Vignettes (2017)
- Conversation Peace (Def Pressé, 2021)
- Peace of Action (Def Pressé, 2024)

Collaboration releases

- Y Society, Travel at Your Own Pace (2007)
- Ears Hear Spears with Insight (Redefinition, 2017)
- Dreams & Vibrations with Flex Mathews (Redefinition, 2018)
- Ground & Water with Blu (2019)
- EAT with Pan Amsterdam (Def Pressé, 2022)

In collaboration with Raw Poetic

- The Reflecting Sea (Welcome to a New Philosophy) (2017)
- Moment of Change (2020)
- Ocean Bridges with Archie Shepp (Ensemble: Pat Fritz, Aaron Gause, Luke Stewart, Jamal Moore, and Bashi Rose) (2020)
- Big Tiny Planet (2021)
- Laminated Skies (Def Pressé, 2022)
- Space Beyond the Solar System (2022)
- Away Back In (Def Pressé, 2023)
