= DJ Haram =

American DJ and record producer

- Born: Zubeyda Muzeyyen; California, United States
- Origin: New Jersey, United States
- Occupations: DJ; record producer
- Years active: 2015–present
- Label: Hyperdub
- Member of: 700 Bliss

Zubeyda Muzeyyen, better known by her stage name DJ Haram, is an American DJ and record producer. She is a member of 700 Bliss, along with Moor Mother. Her debut solo studio album, Beside Myself, was released in 2025.

== Biography ==
Zubeyda Muzeyyen was born in California. She is of Syrian and Circassian descent. She grew up in New Jersey. In 2012, she moved to Philadelphia. She is based in New York.

She is a member of 700 Bliss, along with Moor Mother. The duo released the Spa 700 EP in 2018. The duo's debut studio album, Nothing to Declare, was released in 2022.

As a solo artist, she released her debut solo EP, Mixed Berries, in 2019. In that year, she also released the Grace EP through Hyperdub. She then self-released the Era EP in 2021. In 2023, she released the Handplay EP through Hyperdub.

In 2025, she released her debut solo studio album, Beside Myself, through Hyperdub. It received universal acclaim from critics.

On March 13, 2026, during the Biennale of Sydney, Muzeyyen was condemned by Jewish groups and Chris Minns, the premier of New South Wales, after stating that a "Zio-Australian-Epstein empire" was responsible for silencing dissenters. She also expressed solidarity with the people of Iran, Sudan, Lebanon, Syria and Palestine. Muzeyyen also chanted phrases "long live the resistance", "glory to all of our martyrs" and "from the river to the sea, Palestine will be free" during the festival.

== Discography ==
=== Studio albums ===
- Nothing to Declare (with Moor Mother, as 700 Bliss; Hyperdub, 2022)
- Beside Myself (Hyperdub, 2025)
- Critical Thot (with Sha Ray; Backwoodz Studioz, 2026)

=== EPs ===
- Spa 700 (with Moor Mother, as 700 Bliss; Halcyon Veil/Don Giovanni Records, 2018)
- Mixed Berries (self-released, 2019)
- Grace (Hyperdub, 2019)
- Era (self-released, 2021)
- Handplay (Hyperdub, 2023)

=== Production ===
- Armand Hammer – We Buy Diabetic Test Strips ("Trauma Mic" and "Supermooned"; Fat Possum Records, 2023)
- Elucid – Revelator ("Zigzagzig"; Fat Possum Records, 2024)
- Billy Woods – Golliwog ("All These Worlds Are Yours"; Backwoodz Studioz, 2025)
