= Nothing to Declare (700 Bliss album) =

Studio album by 700 Bliss
- Released: May 27, 2022
- Genres: Electronic; experimental; hip-hop
- Length: 37:50
- Label: Hyperdub

700 Bliss chronology
Spa 700 (2018)	Nothing to Declare (2022)

Nothing to Declare is a studio album by 700 Bliss, an American duo composed of Moor Mother and DJ Haram. Released under Hyperdub on May 27, 2022, the album is 700 Bliss' debut album and comes after their 2018 EP, Spa 700.

== Critical reception ==
Professional ratings
Aggregate scores
Source	Rating
Metacritic	83/100
Review scores
Source	Rating
Beats Per Minute	80%
Crack	9/10
The Line of Best Fit	8/10
Loud and Quiet	6/10
Pitchfork	8.3/10
The Skinny	3/5 stars

On the review aggregator Metacritic, Nothing to Declare received a 83 out of 100 based on 6 published reviews. Nathan Evans wrote for Pitchfork that the album is "anchored" by various instruments and "gristly streaks of noise" and called the almost constant re-pitching of the musicians voices "a hall-of-mirrors twisting of the two musicians’ personalities". Joe Creely of The Skinny wrote that in the latter part of Nothing to Declare it "begins to feel like ideas are being repeated" claiming that the songs in the album "slightly [outstays] its welcome".

=== Accolades ===
Year-end lists for Nothing to Declare
Publication	List	Rank	Ref.
Crack	The Top 50 Albums of 2022	33	
DJ Mag	DJ Mag's Top Albums of 2022	—	
Pitchfork	The 50 Best Albums of 2022	42	
PopMatters	The 80 Best Albums of 2022	23	

== Track listing ==
All tracks are written by 700 Bliss.

Nothing to Declare track listing
No.	Title	Length
1.	"Nothing to Declare"	02:34
2.	"Totally Spies" (featuring Lafawndah)	02:15
3.	"Nightflame" (featuring Orion Sun)	03:23
4.	"Anthology"	03:25
5.	"Discipline"	02:43
6.	"Bless Grips"	02:09
7.	"Easyjet"	01:13
8.	"Candace Parker" (featuring Muqata'a)	02:36
9.	"No More Kings"	02:45
10.	"Capitol" (featuring Alli Logout)	03:04
11.	"Sixteen"	02:42
12.	"Spirit Airlines"	00:40
13.	"Crown"	01:32
14.	"More Victories" (featuring M. Téllez)	02:31
15.	"Seven"	02:39
16.	"Lead Level 15" (featuring Ase Manual)	01:39
Total length:		37:50
