= A Year of Octobers =

Studio album by YOUNGMAN and Celestaphone
- Released: August 20, 2021
- Recorded: 2019–2021
- Genre: Hip hop
- Length: 38:58
- Label: Drumhex
- Producer: Celestaphone

MC Paul Barman chronology
Echo Chamber (2018)	A Year of Octobers (2021)

Celestaphone chronology
Weevil in Disguise (2020)	A Year of Octobers (2021)	Paper Cut from the Obit (2023)

Singles from A Year of Octobers
- 1. "If I Got It You Got It" Released: March 20, 2020; 2. "Inspired" Released: May 1, 2020

A Year of Octobers is the first collaborative studio album by American rapper MC Paul Barman and record producer Celestaphone. It was released August 20, 2021, on Drumhex. Barman performs as virtual band member and alter ego YOUNGMAN on each song, except for "Guillotine", performed as himself. The album was produced entirely by Celestaphone.

== Background ==
The YOUNGMAN character was created during conversations MC Paul Barman had with rapper MF Doom. Their earliest appearances include songs "YOUNGMAN Speaks on (((race)))" on 2018's (((echo chamber))), and "The Young Man Has A Point (Nurture)" from Milo's 2017 album Who Told You to Think??!!?!?!?!

== Critical reception ==
Professional ratings
Review scores
Source	Rating
Focus Hip Hop	91/100

OG Nick Marsh of Focus Hip Hop gave the album a 91 out of 100, saying, "Celestaphone’s dynamic, layered, detailed production is phenomenal, and YOUNGMAN’s whole existence is just further proof that MC Paul Barman is one of the best writers in Hip Hop right now."

== Track listing ==
All tracks produced by Celestaphone.

No.	Title	Writer(s)	Length
1.	"A Year of Octobers"	Paul Barman; Joseph Murphy	5:07
2.	"13th Month"	Barman; Murphy	2:08
3.	"Guillotine" (featuring MC Paul Barman)	Barman; Murphy	2:23
4.	"Human Rights" (featuring Billy Woods)	Barman; Murphy; Woods	3:27
5.	"If I Got It You Got It"	Barman; Blake Lethem; Murphy	3:46
6.	"Yes"	Barman; Murphy	3:19
7.	"Inspired"	Barman; Murphy	2:14
8.	"Medically Induced Coma"	Barman; Murphy	2:42
9.	"No"	Barman; Murphy	3:39
10.	"All in a Day’s Work"	Barman; Murphy	2:45
11.	"Galactic Luv"	Barman; Murphy	2:39
12.	"Peak Boss"	Barman; Lethem; Murphy	4:44
Total length:			38:58

== Personnel ==
Credits for A Year of Octobers adapted from Bandcamp.

- Paul Barman as YOUNGMAN – art direction, lead vocals, recording engineer, rhymes
- Celestaphone – art direction, keyboards, mastering, mixing, producer, turntable
- Hunt Emerson – cover illustration
- Eli Gesner – recording engineer
- Suzanne Goldish – recording engineer
- Josh Grotto – cover colorist
- Alex Haught – layoutist
- Wayne Middleton – dog photo
- Steel Tipped Dove – recording engineer
- Billy Woods – featured artist
