= Postgraduate Work =

EP by MC Paul Barman
- Released: 1998
- Recorded: ???
- Genre: Hip hop
- Label: Househusband
- Producer: Self-Produced

MC Paul Barman chronology
Postgraduate Work (1998)	It's Very Stimulating (2000)

Postgraduate Work is a self-produced 7" record released by MC Paul Barman. He recorded it a year after graduating from Brown University.

Barman mailed a copy of the 7" to Prince Paul, who was impressed enough to agree to produce the rapper's first EP.

== Track listing ==
1. "MC Fibonacci Sequence vs. Interrupting Rapper"
2. "A Very Sad Story"
3. "Enter Pan-Man"
4. "The Name In All Caps"
