= Casual-T =

Composer and musician

- Casual-T and Chris Young in 2009

Background information
- Occupations: Composer, producer, musician
- Website: brooklyncomposer.com

Casual-T is a New York/Hollywood-based musical composer and musician. He earned his Master of Music in Percussion Performance from the University of Music and Performing Arts, Vienna in 1992, and his second Master of Music from the Conservatory of the City of Vienna in drum set performance in 1995. As a drummer Casual-T studied with Prof. Horst Berger, Prof. Wolfgang Schuster, and Prof. Kurt Prihoda, who, at the time, were all members of the Vienna Philharmonic Orchestra, as well as Prof, Gerhard Fromme from the Vienna Radio Symphony Orchestra. He studied drum set with Prof. Walter Grassmann and Prof. Fredvard Muehlhofer, as well as Latin percussion with Prof. Anton Muehlhofer. He also studied privately with renowned drum set artists Kenwood Dennard, Jojo Mayer, Gene Lake, and Marimbaphone soloist Neboja Zivkovic.

As a composer he has written music for three feature films, as well as a number of short subject films, and has received many placements on cable and network TV programs. He participated in the 2010 "Hollywood Calling" film scoring workshop with Christopher Young, the 2010 Rick Baitz "Composing for the Screen" Film Scoring Workshop, and the 2009 "The Art of Orchestration" Workshop with Steven Scott Smalley. He was a featured composer in the June '08 edition of Student Filmmakers Magazine.

As a drummer he has performed with orchestras and chamber music ensembles throughout Europe, as well as numerous bands worldwide. Amongst these bands was the Austrian Indie-band Bomb Circle, as well as NYC-Glam Rock Darlings The Drown. He also performed as a drummer for the Broadway productions of the musicals Chicago (revival) and Spring Awakening, as well as off-broadway, off-off broadway productions and theater festivals such as the world-premiere of "This One Girl's Story", a musical inspired by the proud life of Sakia Gunn, at the 2010 Gayfest NYC, New York International Fringe Festival, and The Gallery Players (whose production for the musical Urinetown, won Outstanding Production of a Musical at the 2007 New York Innovative Theatre Awards.

== Filmography ==
- Siren Song (2015) Aristos Films - composer
- Treasure Nest (2014) - composer/sound design/voice over artist
- Curious Cat's Christmas (2013) - composer/sound design/voice over artist
- Fat Cory (2013) - composer/sound design/voice over artist
- Terra Sai (2013) - composer/sound design
- Fishy Business (2012) - composer/sound design
- The Mustard Seed (2012) - composer/sound design
- Evy in the New Word (2012) - composer/sound design
- Losing Grandma (2011) - composer
- Desperate Crossing (2011) – composer/sound design/voice over
- Shinobi Blues (2011) – composer/sound design/voice over
- Lure of the Plume (2011) – composer/sound design
- The Job Interview (2011) – composer/sound design
- One Cakey Afternoon (2010) – composer/sound design/voice over
- Only Time Will Tell (2010) – composer
- Frankie's Jewels (2009) Pacific Storm Films- composer
- Son of a Hustler (2009-unreleased) – composer
- Fighting Nirvana (2009) Honeydew546 Productions – composer
- Degradation (2009) – composer
- Lawn God and the Chronicles of Dent De Lion (2008) Cinekoncept – composer
- Preston (2008 – 48 Hour Film Project) HCQ Productions – composer
- Ctrl, Alt, Del – A Love Story (2007 – 48 Hour Film Project) HCQ Productions – composer

== List of Compositions (Concert Music) ==
- "Quand les sirènes pleurent" for Solo Piano and Orchestra (2009)
- "Phantasms and Dreams" for Solo Violin and Orchestra (2008)

=== Other works ===
- "Corporate Music Logo" for OCM Productions (2009)
- "Multimedia Music Logo" Hudds Music Scene (2007)

== Discography (as a drummer) ==
- "Love Revolution" – Machine Wash Cold (2010)
- "In A Living Room" – We Make Music (2007)
- "The Drown Remastered" – The Drown (2006)
- "The Journey Continues" – Phoenix & After Buffalo (2006)
- "Vile Bodies (EP)" – The Drown (2003)
- "The State of Blue Eyed Soul" – Philip Clark (2002)
- "Take a Ride into the Life of Thomas Alva Edison" – Buddy & The Huddle (2000)
- "Alien Lovers" – TERA (1999)
- "What Happened Here?" – Mr. Karl (1998)
- "Evolution of Funk" – Evolution (1997)
- "Fluid Drive" – Jesus Chrysler (1996)
- "Steroids (EP)" – Bomb Circle (1996)
- "Time To Act" – Bomb Circle/Various (1996)
- "Boiler Live Pool III" – Bomb Circle/Various (1995)
- "Grateful Ethiopians Burst Out in Songs of Joy" – Bomb Circle (1994)
- "Boiler Live Pool – Summerline" – Bomb Circle/Various (1994)
- "Philharmonic Rock Symphonies" – Vienna Philharmonic Rock Symphony Orchestra (1994)
- "Time To Act" – Bomb Circle (1993)
- "Schlagwerk, Alphorn, Orgel" – NÖ Tonkünstler Kammerorchester (1990)
