= It's Very Stimulating =

EP by MC Paul Barman
- Released: 2000
- Genre: Hip hop
- Length: 18:01
- Label: WordSound
- Producer: Prince Paul

MC Paul Barman chronology
Postgraduate Work (1998)	It's Very Stimulating (2000)	Paullelujah! (2002)

Alternative cover
- Re-release edition cover

It's Very Stimulating is the debut EP by MC Paul Barman, released in 2000.

== Critical reception ==
Professional ratings
Review scores
Source	Rating
AllMusic	3/5 stars
Robert Christgau	A−
Pitchfork	5.8/10
RapReviews	8.5/10
Rolling Stone	4/5 stars
The New Rolling Stone Album Guide	4/5 stars

Nathan Rabin of AllMusic said, "Self-deprecating, whip-smart, and adventurous, Barman is a true hip-hop original, a brainy clown with a demented flow that suggests equally the scatological obsessions of Kool Keith and the anything-goes raunchiness of a borscht-belt comic." He added, "Ultimately, It's Very Stimulating is little more than a simultaneously tempting and frustrating appetizer for Barman's first album, a work that will go a long way toward determining whether Barman is indeed a forward-thinking hip-hop genius or just an over-educated novelty act with a good vocabulary and too much time on his hands." Ryan Kearney of Pitchfork gave the EP a 5.8 out of 10, saying, "Like wrapping a string around a dead bird, spinning it through the air, and seeing its body fly into the sunroof of a Le Car, MC Paul Barman is odd, funny, and mostly harmless."

Rolling Stone listed it on its "Top Fifty Albums of 2000" list. In 2013, Spin listed it on their "20 Dope Albums by Wack Rappers" list.

== Track listing ==
No.	Title	Length
1.	"An Introduction"	1:33
2.	"The Joy of Your World"	3:30
3.	"School Anthem" (featuring Mr. Len)	2:40
4.	"Salvation Barmy" (featuring Black Italian a.k.a. The Popmaster)	2:16
5.	"I'm Fricking Awesome" (featuring DJAV)	2:55
6.	"MTV Get Off the Air, Part 2" (featuring Princess Superstar)	5:07

== Personnel ==
Credits adapted from liner notes.

- Prince Paul – production
- Skza – executive production
- Mike Fossenkemper – mastering
- Susan Now – design, photography
- MC Paul Barman – illustration
- Keith McCulloch – illustration
