= Who Sent You? =

Studio album by Irreversible Entanglements
- Released: March 20, 2020
- Recorded: March 1, 2019
- Studio: Kawari (Philadelphia)
- Genres: Free jazz; spoken word
- Length: 43:23
- Labels: Don Giovanni; International Anthem
- Producer: Irreversible Entanglements

Irreversible Entanglements chronology
Irreversible Entanglements (2017)	Who Sent You? (2020)	Open the Gates (2021)

Who Sent You? is the second studio album by American free jazz collective Irreversible Entanglements. It was released through Don Giovanni Records and International Anthem Recording Company in March 2020.

== Composition ==
On Who Sent You?, the quintet craft a fusion of "tight, synergistic" free jazz with "dynamic" spoken word.

== Critical reception ==
Professional ratings
Aggregate scores
Source	Rating
Metacritic	87/100
Review scores
Source	Rating
All About Jazz	4/5 stars
AllMusic	4.5/5 stars
Paste	8.0/10
Pitchfork	7.9/10

Upon its release, Who Sent You? was welcomed with critical applause. On Metacritic, it has a score of 87 out of 100, indicating "universal acclaim", based on four reviews.

=== Year-end lists ===
Appearances on year-end lists for Who Sent You?
Publication	List	Rank	Ref.
AllMusic	AllMusic Best of 2020	–	
AllMusic	Favorite Jazz Albums	–	
Stereogum	The 10 Best Jazz Albums of 2020	2	

== Track listing ==
Words composed by Camae Ayewa. Music composed by Keir Neuringer, Aquiles Navarro, Luke Stewart and Tcheser Holmes, except where noted.

Who Sent You? track listing
No.	Title	Music	Length
1.	"The Code Noir / Amina"	Neuringer ("Amina")	7:30
2.	"Who Sent You - Ritual"		14:45
3.	"No Más"	Navarro	7:58
4.	"Blues Ideology"		8:22
5.	"Bread Out of Stone"		4:48
Total length:			43:23

== Personnel ==
Irreversible Entanglements

- Camae Ayewa – voice, texts
- Keir Neuringer – saxophone, percussion
- Aquiles Navarro – trumpet, percussion
- Luke Stewart – double bass, percussion
- Tcheser Holmes – drums, congas

Technical

- Irreversible Entanglements – production
- Zach Goldstein – engineering
- David Allen – mixing at Decade Studios, Chicago
- Greg Obis – mastering at Chicago Mastering Service

== Charts ==
Chart performance for Who Sent You?
Chart (2020)	Peak position
UK Album Downloads (Official Charts)	44
UK Independent Albums (Official Charts)	50
UK Jazz & Blues Albums (Official Charts)	5
