= Paullelujah! =

Studio album by MC Paul Barman
- Released: October 15, 2002
- Genre: Hip hop
- Length: 44:17
- Label: Coup d'Etat
- Producers: MikeTheMusicGuy; Phofo; MC Paul Barman; Prince Paul; MF Doom; Memory Man

MC Paul Barman chronology
It's Very Stimulating (2000)	Paullelujah! (2002)	Thought Balloon Mushroom Cloud (2009)

Singles from Paullelujah!
- 1. "Cock Mobster" Released: 2002

Professional ratings
Review scores
Source	Rating
AllMusic	2.5/5 stars
The A.V. Club	favorable
City Pages	favorable
Robert Christgau	A−
Entertainment Weekly	B−
Pitchfork	2.0/10
PopMatters	mixed
RapReviews.com	8/10
Salon	favorable
XLR8R	favorable

Paullelujah! is the first studio album by American hip hop musician MC Paul Barman. It was released on Coup d'État in 2002.

== Critical reception ==
John Bush of AllMusic gave the album 2.5 stars out of 5, saying, "As a rapper, MC Paul Barman makes a pretty good humorist, though he's actually more clever than he is funny." Nathan Rabin of The A.V. Club said, "A steady diet of nothing but MC Paul Barman would be tough to take, but it'll be a sad day when there's no place in hip-hop for his kind of goofy iconoclast."

Will Hermes of Entertainment Weekly gave the album a grade of B−, describing MC Paul Barman as "a class clown courting a beat-down, a slappable slapsticker matching weakling production and little-league flow with gym-toned wit and ghetto chutzpah." Steve Juon of RapReviews.com said, "it's great for anyone who gets his concept, but his 'whiter than whitebread' rap flow will still irritate the hell out of everyone else.

== Track listing ==
No.	Title	Producer(s)	Length
1.	"It's Here"	MikeTheMusicGuy	0:42
2.	"Paullelujah"	MikeTheMusicGuy	3:07
3.	"Cock Mobster"	MikeTheMusicGuy	3:53
4.	"Old Paul"	Phofo; MC Paul Barman	4:15
5.	"Bleeding Brain Grow"	Prince Paul	2:39
6.	"N.O.W."	MikeTheMusicGuy	3:35
7.	"Excuse You"	Phofo	3:11
8.	"Vulture Shark Sculpture Park"	MikeTheMusicGuy	4:05
9.	"Anarchist Bookstore Part 1"	MF Doom	3:32
10.	"Burping and Farting"	Phofo	1:55
11.	"Talking Time Travel"	MikeTheMusicGuy	4:27
12.	"Anarchist Bookstore Part 2"	MF Doom	4:35
13.	"A Somewhat New Medium"	MikeTheMusicGuy	4:14
Total length:			44:17

2010 remastered edition bonus tracks
No.	Title	Producer(s)	Length
14.	"Make No Mistake"	Phofo	3:08
15.	"Kibbutznik"	Phofo	2:31
16.	"Buy Low, Sell High"	Phofo	2:24
17.	"Don't Micromanage My Psychodamage"	Phofo	3:36
18.	"Cock Mobster (Live on XM Radio 2003)"	MikeTheMusicGuy	3:51
19.	"Senioritis 2010"	MF Doom; Memory Man	2:35
Total length:			63:04
