= Gayfest NYC =

Theatre festival in New York City

Gayfest NYC is an annual theatre festival in New York City which showcases plays and musicals that feature gay, lesbian, bisexual, or transgender themes, plotlines, and/or creative teams. The festival is produced by Bruce Robert Harris and Jack W. Batman. The goal is to produce professional showcases of new works, complete with an Actor's Equity Association cast and director.

Gayfest NYC is also a fundraiser for the Harvey Milk High School. The money raised by the festival has helped to send several students from Harvey Milk to college.

== 2007 ==
2007 was the first year of Gayfest NYC. Three shows (A Kiss from Alexander by Stephan DeGhelder and Brad Simmons, Competing Narratives by A.B. Asher, and Revolution by Michael D. Jackson) were chosen to be presented as mainstage productions, and two shows (Edward the King by David Hopes, and The Casserole Brigade by Robert John Ford) were selected as staged readings.

== 2008 ==
In 2008, Gayfest NYC produced a full production of Edward the King, as well as The Wrath of Aphrodite by Tim O'Leary, Jumping Blind by Philip Gerson, Spill the Wine by Brian Dykstra, and Steve Hayes' Hollywood Reunion, written by and starring Steve Hayes.
