= Nappy Nina =

American rapper

Nappy Nina is an American rapper and producer. Raised in Oakland, she performed slam poetry as an emcee in her adolescence. She moved to Brooklyn, New York in 2012 and has released the albums Naptime, Extra Ordinary, The Tree Act, and Dumb Doubt.

== Early life ==
Born in Oakland, California, she spent part of her childhood there before moving to nearby Union City. Her father, Greg Bridges, is a popular local journalist and jazz radio host. Because of her father's work in music she spent time around local musicians like Eesu Orundide and D'wayne Wiggins of Tony! Toni! Toné!. Bridges played several different instruments growing up, which included piano and jazz clarinet.

As a teenager, she got involved in slam poetry through Youth Works and rapped in her slam performances. In 2012, Nappy Nina moved to Brooklyn with $500 to pursue music. She aspired to become one of the few nationally-recognized rappers from Oakland.

== Career ==
Nappy Nina released her debut EP Naptime in 2015. Her next EP Extra Ordinary was released in 2017. In a positive review, Jamara Mychelle Wakefield wrote for Bitch: "Extra Ordinary is a quality manifesto from a new artist who wanted to prove herself as a “capable and worthy mc.” Nappy Nina’s debut EP floats in the air between Oakland and Brooklyn—refined like coconut oil, but also rough and biting." José Vadi of Amadeus Magazine referred to it as "a project as diverse in sonic structure and cadence as it is in content matter and lyrical depth."

Nappy Nina's rhymes frequently cover political and social issues, as well as her perspectives as a Black queer woman. Her delivery was described as "smooth-sultry...that's almost jazz-like" by Pendarvis Harshaw of KQED.

Her album The Tree Act (2019) was reviewed as combining a "righteous pen game with ace production" by Okayplayer's Karas Lamb.

In 2020 she released the album Dumb Doubt, which Taylor Crumpton of Bandcamp Daily said "marries airy, breathable beats with soulful jazz and Black radical tradition themes." That year she was the featured artist on the track "Money Can't Buy" on Yaeji's debut mixtape What We Drew 우리가 그려왔던. She also produced the track "Weight" with Mexican Summer's Looking Glass digital music series for Brooklyn-based artists affected by the COVID-19 pandemic.

On January 1, 2021, Nappy Nina released the track "Pandemy Stimmy" with Stas Thee Boss. Nina plans to release an EP titled Double Down in 2021. On March 5, 2021, she released the single "The Real Tea" featuring Stas Thee Boss, which Philippe Roberts of Pitchfork reviewed as "formed of equal parts fear and fury, “The Real Tea” finds balance in contradiction, airing grievances with an eye on the future."

== Personal life ==
Nappy Nina is queer.
