= Rasheedah Phillips =

American artist, author, community activist and lawyer

- Education: Temple University, Beasley School of Law
- Occupations: Artist, author, community activist, lawyer
- Writing career
- Language: English
- Genre: Afrofuturism
- Website: www.rasheedah.net

Rasheedah Phillips is an American artist, author, community activist and lawyer based in Philadelphia. She is the creator of The Afrofuturist Affair and, together with Camae Ayewa, the Black Quantum Futurism multidisciplinary artist collective.

== Art and writing ==
Rasheedah Phillips founded The Afrofuturist Affair in 2011 to provide a web-based platform and a community for writers of color working in speculative fiction and similar genres. The project contributed to the founding in 2014 of the multidisciplinary Black Quantum Futurism collective, with artist and musician Camae Ayewa. An exhibition of their work was held at Vancouver's Western Front gallery in 2019. Phillips is also an Afrofuturist science fiction author who has written several self-published books, including Black Quantum Futurism Theory & Practice, Volume I.

== Legal work and community activism ==
To Phillips, creative work and community activism are interrelated dimensions of her fight against racial inequality. Phillips graduated from Beasley School of Law at Temple University in 2008, notably while working and caring for her small child. The same year, she began working for Community Legal Services in Philadelphia, where she later became Managing Attorney of the Housing Unit.

In 2016, Phillips established the Community Futures Lab in the Sharswood-Blumberg neighborhood of North Philadelphia to serve as a community hub and workshop space for residents of the rapidly gentrifying neighborhood. The Lab hosts readings, workshops, a library and facilities for community oral history documentation.

== Awards ==
- 2017 Housing Justice Award, National Housing Law Project
- 2017 City & State Pennsylvania 40 Under 40 Rising Stars
- 2017 Pew Fellowship (together with Camae Ayewa)
