= Open the Gates (Irreversible Entanglements album) =

Studio album by Irreversible Entanglements
- Released: November 12, 2021
- Recorded: January 5, 2021
- Studio: Rittenhouse (Philadelphia)
- Genres: Free jazz; funk; post-punk
- Length: 73:40
- Labels: Don Giovanni; International Anthem
- Producer: Irreversible Entanglements

Irreversible Entanglements chronology
Who Sent You? (2020)	Open the Gates (2021)	Protect Your Light (2023)

Open the Gates is the third studio album by American free jazz collective Irreversible Entanglements. It was released through Don Giovanni Records and International Anthem in November 2021.

== Composition ==
Musically, Open the Gates sees the quintet merge their free jazz roots with "mutant" funk and "angular" post-punk.

== Critical reception ==
Professional ratings
Aggregate scores
Source	Rating
Metacritic	86/100
Review scores
Source	Rating
All About Jazz	4/5 stars
AllMusic	4/5 stars
Loud and Quiet	6/10
Pitchfork	7.8/10

Open the Gates was acclaimed by music critics. On Metacritic, it holds a score of 86 out of 100, indicating "universal acclaim", based on five reviews.

Dustin Krcatovich for The Quietus called it "righteous music", seeing it as "an exciting dilation of [the quintet's] sonic universe".

== Track listing ==
Open the Gates track listing
No.	Title	Length
1.	"Open the Gates"	2:39
2.	"Keys to Creation"	13:41
3.	"Lágrimas Del Mar"	8:03
4.	"Storm Came Twice"	7:20
5.	"Water Meditation"	20:39
6.	"Six Sounds"	10:30
7.	"The Port Remembers"	10:48
Total length:		73:40

== Personnel ==
Irreversible Entanglements

- Camae Ayewa – voice, synth
- Keir Neuringer – saxophone, synth, percussion
- Aquiles Navarro – trumpet, synth
- Luke Stewart – double bass, bass guitar
- Tcheser Holmes – drums, percussion

Technical

- Irreversible Entanglements – production
- Michael Richelle – recording
- Dave Vettraino – mixing at International Anthem Studios, Chicago
- Dave Cooley – mastering at Elysian Masters, Los Angeles

== Charts ==
Chart performance for Open the Gates
Chart (2021)	Peak position
UK Album Downloads (Official Charts)	71
UK Jazz & Blues Albums (Official Charts)	16
