= Irreversible Entanglements =

American band

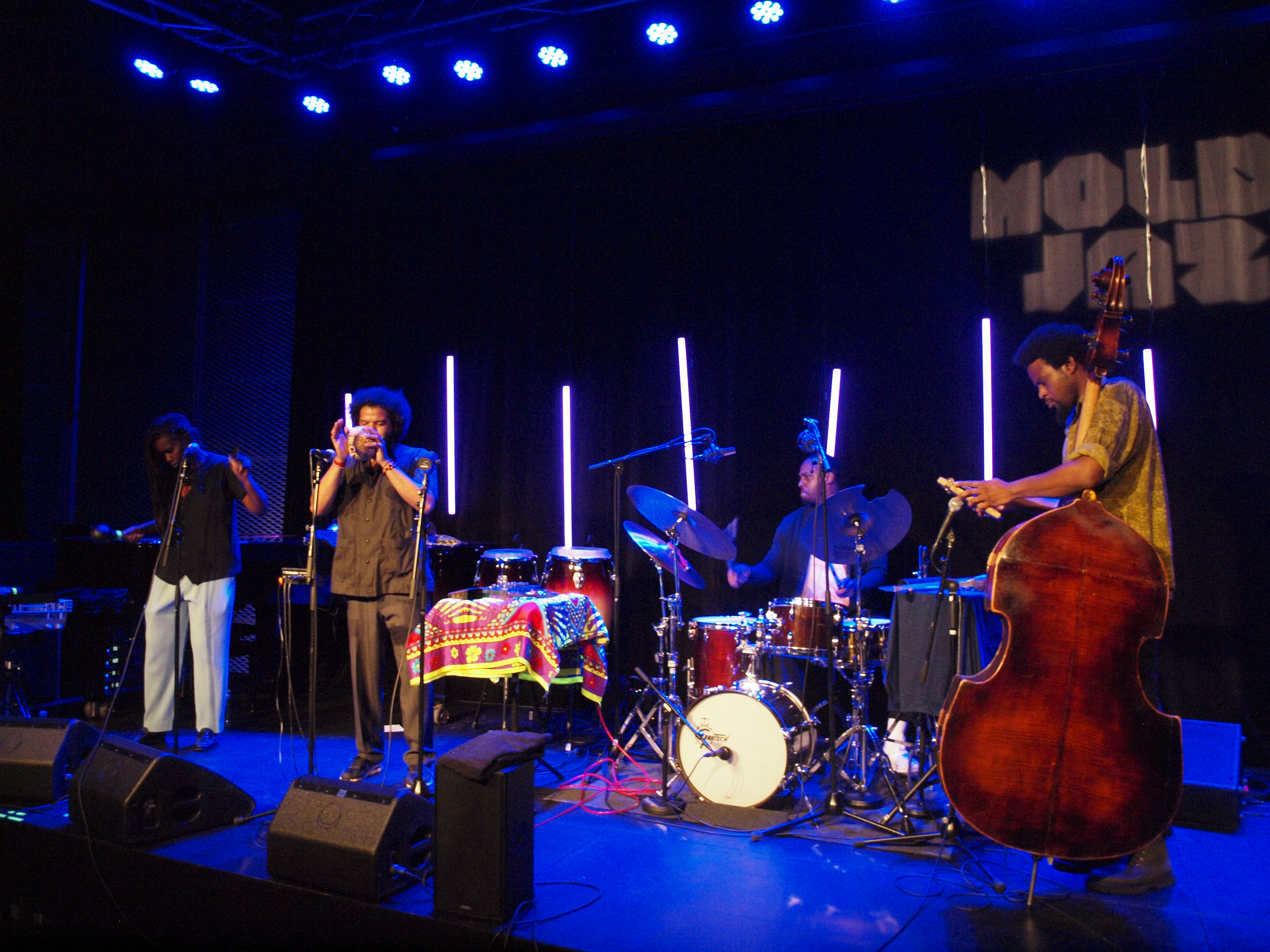
- Irreversible Entanglements playing in Molde in 2024

Background information
- Genres: free jazz; avant-garde jazz; post-punk; noise rock
- Years active: 2015–present
- Labels: International Anthem; Don Giovanni; Impulse!
- Members: Camae Ayewa; Tcheser Holmes; Aquiles Navarro; Keir Neuringer; Luke Stewart
- Website: irreversibleentanglements.com

Irreversible Entanglements is an American free jazz collective formed in 2015. The improvising quintet consists of vocalist Camae Ayewa (also known as Moor Mother), drummer Tcheser Holmes, trumpeter Aquiles Navarro, saxophonist Keir Neuringer, and bassist Luke Stewart. Their albums have been celebrated as among the best in new music by The Wire, The Quietus, Magnet, NPR Music, and Stereogum.

== History and career ==
The members of Irreversible Entanglements met through music and activism: bassist Luke Stewart shared bills with Camae Ayewa's band the Mighty Paradocs; saxophonist Keir Neuringer worked with Books Through Bars, whose events Ayewa has emceed; and the trio of Ayewa, Stewart, and Neuringer was followed by the duo of Aquiles Navarro and Tcheser Holmes at a 2015 Musicians Against Brutality event following the shooting of Akai Gurley.

Their 2017 debut, Irreversible Entanglements, was included in best-of-year lists in The Wire, The Quietus, NPR Music, and in Stereogum's Best Jazz of the Decade for the 2010s. Their second album, Who Sent You?, was celebrated as among 2020's best in The Wire, Magnet, Stereogum, AllMusic, and NPR Music's 2020 Jazz Critics Poll. Their third studio album, 2021's Open the Gates, was recognized for its expansion of the group's sound, with their range and innovation drawing comparisons to the New York Art Quartet, Sun Ra, and the Art Ensemble of Chicago. The album was included among the year's best in NPR Music and Treble.

Irreversible Entanglements performed in the inaugural season of the Kennedy Center's "Direct Current" contemporary culture showcase.

The group's instrumentalists also performed on Ayewa's debut theatrical work, Circuit City.

== Discography ==
- Irreversible Entanglements (2017, International Anthem / Don Giovanni)
- Who Sent You? (2020, International Anthem / Don Giovanni)
- Live in Italy (2020, Bandcamp)
- Live in Berlin (2020, Bandcamp)
- Open the Gates (2021, International Anthem / Don Giovanni)
- Protect Your Light (2023, Impulse! Records)
- Future Present Past (2026, Impulse! Records)
