= Phofo =

American musician

Adam Weitz, better known as Phofo is a music producer from New York. He is best known for composing score for Sushi Pack (a Saturday morning cartoon on CBS), Disney's Club Penguin, and Care Bears. Alongside MF Doom and Prince Paul (producer), Phofo was responsible for producing and engineering MC Paul Barman's critically acclaimed Paullelujah! LP (Coup d'État). He was a contributing writer to McSweeney's "Created in Darkness by Troubled Americans" (Knopf/Random House) and a music consultant to This American Life. As a music executive at APM Music in Los Angeles, California, he has collaborated with SZA, Kendrick Lamar, Future (rapper), Drake, The Black Keys, and Dr. Dre. He was notably the subject of the very first article published by BuzzFeed at its launch.
