= Celestaphone =

American musician and producer

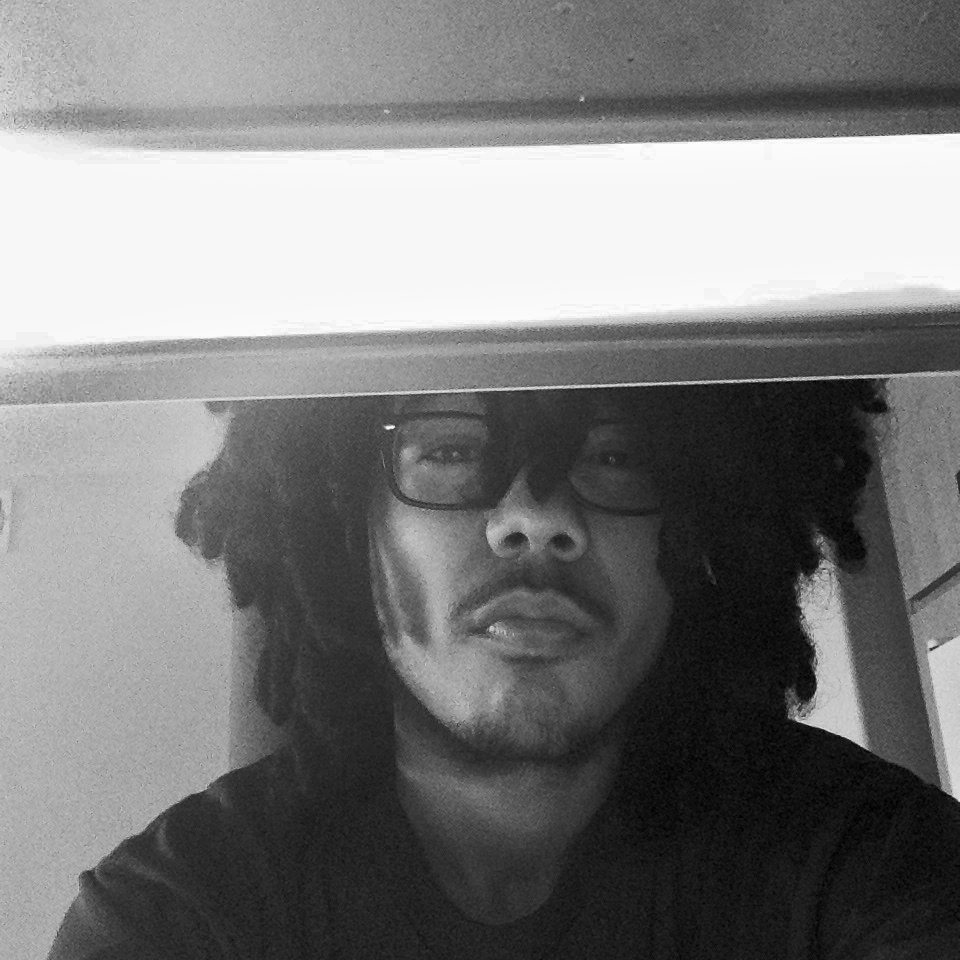

Background information
- Born: Joseph Murphy; October 4, 1996 (age 29)
- Origin: Riverside, California, United States
- Genres: Hip hop; instrumental hip hop; plunderphonics
- Occupations: Record producer; musician
- Years active: 2013–present
- Website: celestaphone.com

Joseph Murphy (born October 4, 1996), professionally known as Celestaphone, is an American musician and record producer.

== Early life ==
Joseph Murphy was born in Riverside, California on October 4, 1996. Several members of his family are musicians, including his parents.

== Career ==
=== 2014–2017: Early recordings and instrumental albums ===
Celestaphone released his first solo EP, Glorifying, in October 2014. His first collaborative effort was producing Dionté BOOM's single "Fish Market" the following year. The song was included in a 2015 edition of the Arkansas Times' Rock Candy journal.

In 2016, Celestaphone published a second EP titled Minappi's Last Wondrous Escapade, and in 2017 he released three full-length albums: Robosoul, To Cite Psych, and To Cite Fright. The EP, along with album To Cite Fright received a nod from Raoul Rego, former webmaster at WREK, in an interview with the station published by Bandcamp Daily. The aforementioned albums, consisting primarily of instrumental hip hop, were met with the creation of Celestaphone's record label Drumhex.

=== 2018–2020: Tying Up Loose Friends and Weevil in Disguise ===
Celestaphone broadened the musical repertoire of his songs in 2018 by including his vocals. His inaugural vocal album, Tying Up Loose Friends, was released on July 30, 2018. He continued this vocal trend into 2020 with his album Weevil in Disguise, featuring the lead single "Rewinders". This song is Celestaphone's first recorded collaboration with MC Paul Barman. As an ode to Barman, who is a hip-hop artist particularly known for their incorporation of palindromes within rap lyrics, "Rewinders" was strategically published on February 2, 2020 (or 02/02/2020), a day uniquely recognized as an exceptionally rare global palindromic date.

=== 2021–present: Year of Octobers and Paper Cut from the Obit ===
A collaborative album between Celestaphone and MC Paul Barman (as alter ego YOUNGMAN) titled A Year of Octobers arrived in August 2021.

Paper Cut from the Obit followed in February 2023.

== Discography ==
=== Solo ===
- Paper Cut from the Obit (2023)
- Weevil in Disguise (2020)
- Tying Up Loose Friends (2018)
- Portrait of a Harlot (2018)
- To Cite Fright (2017)
- To Cite Psych (2017)
- Robosoul (2017)
- Minappi's Last Wondrous Escapade (2016)
- Trust (31–60) (2015)
- Menu (01-30) (2015)
- Glorifying (2014)

=== Collaborative albums ===
- Cult Subterranea (2025) (with Dealers of God)
- A Year of Octobers (2021) (with YOUNGMAN)
