= Black Quantum Futurism =

Artist collective

Black Quantum Futurism (BQF) is a literary and artistic collective composed of Moor Mother (Camae Ayewa) and Rasheedah Phillips. The pair are both queer Black women based in Philadelphia. It is also a name for the set of Afrofuturist theoretical frameworks and methodologies proposed by the collective.

== Artistic philosophy ==
The collective has published a book, Black Quantum Futurism: Theory & Practice (Volume 1) which proposes "a new approach to living and experiencing reality by way of the manipulation of space-time in order to see into possible futures, and/or collapse space-time into a desired future in order to bring about that future’s reality." The book argues that quantum mechanical interpretations of time, spacetime, causality, and interactions are more in agreement with Afrocentric understandings of these same phenomena than with Western ones, and that methodologies which merge these ideas will be able to counter Eurocentric, colonialist structures and conceptions of reality.

BQF's work centers the subjective and cultural nature of time itself, and its material impact as a tool for both the oppression and the survival and liberation of Black people and communities. They claim that Manifest Destiny and westward expansion were as much about time as space; a laying claim not just to the land but to the future and who determines it. For Phillips, who also works as a housing attorney at Community Legal Services, eviction serves as yet another way to cut Black people off from their future, especially in a city where 70% of evictees are Black women. However, in contrast to the ways that Western systems of power attempt to deprive certain communities of their place in a linear future, BQF draws on indigenous African cultural understandings of time from across the Continent and the diaspora to explore cyclical and interactive notions of time that link together the past, present, and future.

The music of Moor Mother (Ayewa's solo musical project) applies BQF methodologies to musical composition and electronic noise manipulation.

== Projects and awards ==
In June 2016, the founders of BQF opened the Community Futures Lab, an "afrofuturist community center" in North Philadelphia where they lead workshops and teach-ins, provide space for artistic practice, and fight gentrification in the area. In the face of increasing displacement caused by gentrification, they invite community members not only to record stories and histories, but also to imagine possible futures for the neighborhood, and to record those as well.

In September 2017, in collaboration with Icebox Project Space, BQF created a two-day program and interactive exhibit titled Time Camp 001, "exploring time, alternative temporalities, time travel, and temporal shifts".

They were one of five 2021 Knight Foundation Arts + Tech Fellows.

BQF was selected as the winner of the 2021 CERN Collide artist's residency, which pairs them with particle physics researchers to produce a new work exploring charge, parity and time reversal symmetry.
