= Fetish Bones =

Studio album by Moor Mother
- Released: September 16, 2016
- Genre: Experimental
- Length: 30:16
- Label: Don Giovanni Records
- Producer: Moor Mother; Ohbliv; Trngnder; Drums Like Machine Guns; Wizard Apprentice

Moor Mother chronology
Fetish Bones (2016)	The Motionless Present (2017)

Fetish Bones is the debut studio album by American musician Moor Mother. It was released via Don Giovanni Records on September 16, 2016.

== Critical reception ==
Professional ratings
Review scores
Source	Rating
Pitchfork	8.2/10

The album was included on Pitchfork's "20 Best Experimental Albums of 2016" list. It was also placed at number 18 on Rolling Stone's "20 Best Avant Albums of 2016" list, number 3 on The Wire's "Top 50 Releases of 2016" list, and number 2 on Bandcamp Daily's "Best Albums of 2016" list.

The song "Creation Myth" was placed at number 88 on Spin's "101 Best Songs of 2016" list. The song "Deadbeat Protest" was placed at number 98 on Pitchfork's "100 Best Songs of 2016" list, as well as number 24 on Noisey's "100 Best Songs of 2016" list.

== Track listing ==
All tracks are written by Camae Ayewa.

No.	Title	Length
1.	"Creation Myth"	4:30
2.	"Parallel Nightmares"	2:29
3.	"Deadbeat Protest"	1:23
4.	"KBGK"	2:27
5.	"Valley of Dry Bones"	2:01
6.	"DIY Time Machine"	2:04
7.	"Tell Me About It"	2:12
8.	"Chain Gang Quantum Blues"	2:25
9.	"By the Light"	2:06
10.	"Cabrini Green x Natasha Mkenna"	3:04
11.	"Nois Bois"	1:50
12.	"Washington Park"	1:44
13.	"Time Float"	2:08

== Personnel ==
Credits adapted from liner notes.

- Moor Mother – production (1, 3, 5, 6, 7, 8, 10, 11, 12), words, vocals, recording, insert
- Ohbliv – production (2)
- Trngnder – production (4)
- Drums Like Machine Guns – production (9)
- Wizard Apprentice – production (13)
- Joe Baldacci – mixing
- Alex Nagel – mastering
- Sasha Burgess – cover photography
- Eva Wo – back cover
- Joe Steinhardt – layout
