= Moor Mother =

American poet, musician, and activist

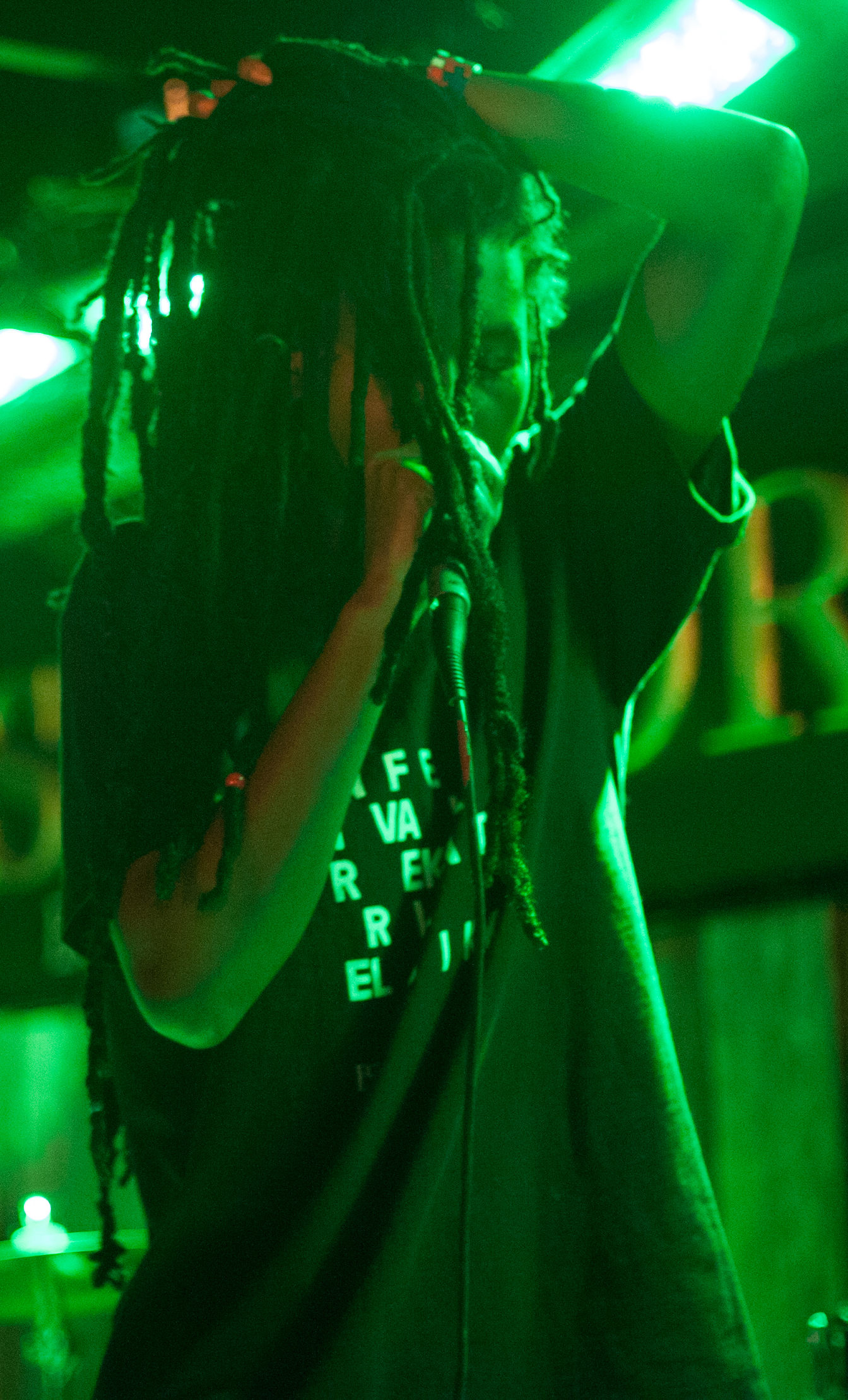
- Ayewa performing in 2017

Background information
- Also known as: Moor Mother Goddess; Camae Defstar
- Born: Camae Ayewa; November 19, 1981 (age 44); Aberdeen, Maryland, U.S.
- Origin: Philadelphia, Pennsylvania, U.S.
- Genre: Experimental
- Occupations: Poet; musician; activist
- Years active: 2012–present
- Labels: Don Giovanni; The Vinyl Factory; Anti-
- Member of: Irreversible Entanglements; 700 Bliss
- Website: moormother.net

Camae Ayewa, (born November 19, 1981) better known by her stage name Moor Mother, is an American poet, musician, and activist from Philadelphia, Pennsylvania. She is one half of the collective Black Quantum Futurism, along with Rasheedah Phillips, and co-leads the groups Irreversible Entanglements and 700 Bliss.

== Early life and education ==
Ayewa was born in Aberdeen, Maryland, where she grew up in a public housing project. She moved to Philadelphia, Pennsylvania to study photography at the Art Institute.

== Career ==
In 2016, Moor Mother released a studio album, Fetish Bones, on Don Giovanni Records. The album, which was released alongside a 122-page book of poetry, was included on year-end lists by Pitchfork, Rolling Stone, and The Wire.

In 2017, she released a studio album, The Motionless Present, on The Vinyl Factory. It featured collaborations with Geng, DJ Haram, Mental Jewelry, and Rasheedah Phillips. The same year, she released a collaborative EP with Mental Jewelry, titled Crime Waves, on Don Giovanni Records.

In 2018, she formed the duo 700 Bliss with past collaborator DJ Haram and released their debut EP Spa 700 through Halcyon Veil and Don Giovanni Records.

She served as one of the guest curators at the 2018 Le Guess Who? music festival. In 2019, she released Analog Fluids of Sonic Black Holes.

Ayewa co-leads and provides lyrics and vocals for the "liberation-oriented free-jazz collective" Irreversible Entanglements. She met the quintet's members through musical and activist endeavors: bassist Luke Stewart shared bills with her band the Mighty Paradocs; saxophonist Keir Neuringer worked with Books Through Bars, whose events Ayewa has emceed; and the trio of Ayewa, Stewart, and Neuringer was followed by the duo of trumpeter Aquiles Navarro and drummer Tcheser Holmes at a 2015 Musicians Against Brutality event following the shooting of Akai Gurley. The group performed in the inaugural season of the Kennedy Center's "Direct Current" contemporary culture showcase, and their releases have been included in best-of lists in Magnet, NPR Music, The Quietus, and Stereogum's "20 Best Jazz Albums Of The 2010s". The band's instrumentalists also performed on Ayewa's debut theatrical work, Circuit City.

She also released Black Encyclopedia of the Air (2021).

In the fall of 2021, Ayewa began serving as an assistant professor at the University of Southern California's Thornton School of Music.

In 2025, Moor Mother released a collaborative album with Sumac, titled The Film.

In 2026, Ayewa contributed to a sound installation at the 61st Venice Biennale, and worked with women prisoners in Venice to create an installation at the Biennale Musica. She is scheduled to headline the 25th annual San Francisco Electronic Music Festival on September 26.

== Discography ==
=== Studio albums ===
- Fetish Bones (2016)
- The Motionless Present (2017)
- Analog Fluids of Sonic Black Holes (2019)
- True Opera (with Mental Jewelry, as Moor Jewelry; 2020)
- Circuit City (2020)
- Brass (with Billy Woods; 2020)
- Black Encyclopedia of the Air (2021)
- Jazz Codes (2022)
- The Great Bailout (2024)
- The Film (with Sumac; 2025)

=== With Irreversible Entanglements ===
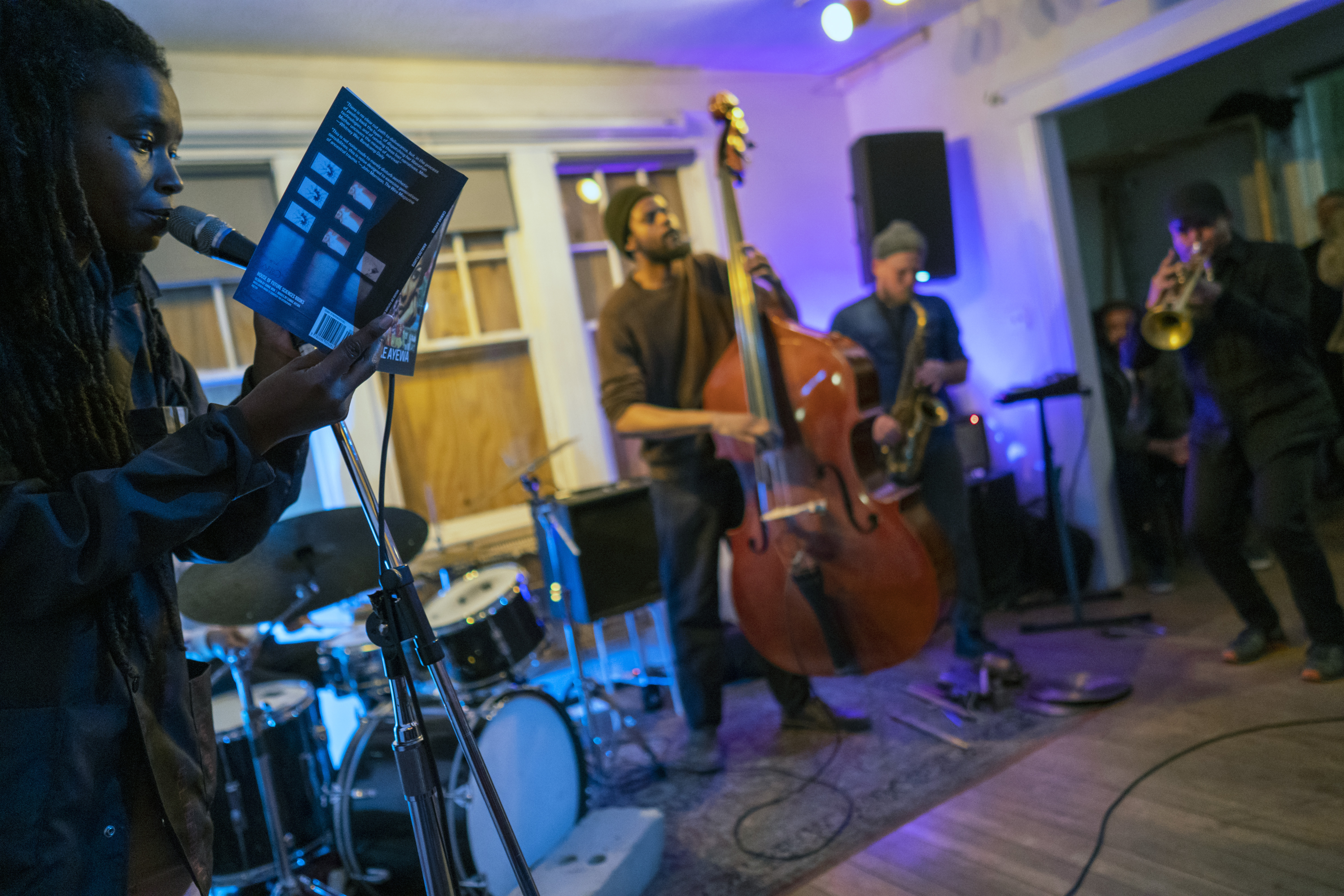
Ayewa performing with Irreversible Entanglements

- Irreversible Entanglements (International Anthem, 2017)
- Who Sent You? (International Anthem, 2020)
- Live in Italy (self-released, 2020)
- Live in Berlin (self-released, 2020)
- Open the Gates (Don Giovanni/International Anthem, 2021)

=== With 700 Bliss ===
- Spa 700 (2018)
- Nothing to Declare (2022)

=== Compilation albums ===
- Manufacture of Indigo (2015)
- Clepsydra (2020)
- Anthologia 01 (with Olof Melander; 2020)

=== Live albums ===
- Offering: Live at Le Guess Who (with Nicole Mitchell; 2020)

=== EPs ===
- Crime Waves (with Mental Jewelry; 2017)

=== Guest appearances ===
- Fhloston Paradigm - "...All" from After... (2017)
- Show Me the Body - "In a Grave" and "Everything Hate Here" from Corpus I (2017)
- Lushlife - "I've Seen It Before I Was There" from My Idols Are Dead + My Enemies Are in Power (2017)
- Eartheater - "MMXXX" from Irisiri (2018)
- Reef the Lost Cauze - "Splinters" from The Majestic (2018)
- Screaming Females - "End of My Bloodline (Remix)" from Singles Too (2019)
- Art Ensemble of Chicago, We Are On the Edge (Pi, 2019)
- Zonal - "Body of Wire", "In a Cage", "System Error", "Medulla", "Catalyst", and "No Investigation" from Wrecked (2019)
- Harrga - "À Vif" from Héroïques Animaux de la Misère (2019)
- Armand Hammer - "Ramses II" from Shrines (2020)
- Sons of Kemet - "Pick Up Your Burning Cross" from Black To the Future (2021)
- The Bug - "Vexed" from Fire (2021)
- madam data - "In the emptiness beyond emptinesses..." from The Gospel of the Devourer (PTP, 2021)
- Art Ensemble of Chicago, The Sixth Decade: From Paris to Paris (RogueArt, 2023)
- Celestaphone - "Tithes" from Paper Cut from the Obit (2023)
- Shapednoise - "Poetry" from Absurd Matter (WEIGHT LOOMING, 2023)

=== Remixes ===
- Gonjasufi - "The Kill (Moor Mother Remix)" from Mandela Effect (2017)
- What Cheer? Brigade - "Iahabibi (Moor Mother Remix)" from You Can't See Inside of Me (2017)
- The Avalanches - "Because I'm Me (Moor Mother Remix)" from Because I'm Me (Remixes) (2018)
- Sumac - "World of Light (Moor Mother Remix)" from The Keeper′s Tongue (2024)
