= 2026 Libera Awards =

Annual US music awards ceremony

- Date: June 8, 2026
- Location: Gotham Hall, New York City, United States
- Presented by: American Association of Independent Music (A2IM)
- Hosted by: Delisa Shannon
- Most awards: Geese & Oklou (4)
- Most nominations: Geese (5)
- Website: liberaawards.com

The 15th Libera Awards, also named 2026 Libera Awards, were held on June 8, 2026, at Gotham Hall in New York City, United States, presented by the American Association of Independent Music (A2IM) to recognize achievements in independent music in 2025. The ceremony was hosted by Delisa Shannon, short-form content director of Billboard, and featured performanced by Mdou Moctar, Valerie June, Dawn Richard, and Aaron Maine of Porches.

The nominations were announced on March 18, 2026. American rock band Geese led the nominations with five, followed by Hayley Williams and Clipse, both with four nods each. The category for Independent Record Store of the Year was introduced while the award for Best Record from Games and Interactive Media returned after not being presented during the previous edition.

== Winners and nominees ==
The nominees were announced on March 18, 2026. Winners will be listed first and in bold.

| Record of the Year | Breakthrough Artist |
|---|---|
| **Getting Killed – Geese (Partisan Records / Play It Again Sam)**; Let God Sort Em Out – Clipse (Self-released); Ego Death at a Bachelorette Party – Hayley Williams (Post Atlantic); Sad and Beautiful World – Mavis Staples (Anti-); choke enough – Oklou (True Panther Records); Tranquilizer – Oneohtrix Point Never (Warp Records); Bleeds – Wednesday (Dead Oceans) | **Geese (Partisan Records / Play It Again Sam)**; Gelli Haha (Innovative Leisure); Lambrini Girls (City Slang); Nourished by Time (XL Recordings); Water From Your Eyes (Matador Records) |
| Best Alternative Rock Record | Best American Roots Record |
| **Getting Killed – Geese (Partisan Records / Play It Again Sam)**; Straight Line Was a Lie – The Beths (Anti-); Dancing Shoes – Nilufer Yanya (Ninja Tune); The Passionate Ones – Nourished by Time (XL Recordings); It's a Beautiful Place – Water from Your Eyes (Matador Records) | **I'll Be Waving as You Drive Away – Hayden Pedigo (Mexican Summer)**; Nobody's Girl – Amanda Shires (ATO Records); Burnover – Greg Freeman (Transgressive Records / Canvasback); Earthstar Mountain – Hannah Cohen (Congrats Records); "Heavy Foot" – Mon Rovîa (Nettwerk Music Group); Neon Grey Midnight Green – Neko Case (Anti-); Owls, Omens and Oracles – Valerie June (Concord Records) |
| Best Blues Record | Best Classical Record |
| **The Last Real Texas Blues Album – Antone's 50th Allstars (New West Records)**; Audience with the Queen – Galactic & Irma Thomas (Tchoup-zilla Records); One Hour Mama: The Blues of Victoria Spivey – Maria Muldaur (Nola Blue Records); Room on the Porch – Taj Mahal & Keb' Mo'; Mad Dogs & Englishmen Revisited Live at LOCKN' – Tedeschi Trucks Band & Leon Russell (Fantasy Records) | **Nature – Tiffany Poon (Pentatone)**; A Series of Actions in a Sphere of Forever – Kara-Lis Coverdale (Smalltown Supersound); Hymnal – Lyra Pramuk (7K!); Schubert Beatles – Theo Hoffman (NYFOS Records); The Dunbar/Moore Sessions, Vol. II – Will Liverman (Lexicon Classics) |
| Best Country Record | Best Dance Record |
| **Hard Headed Woman – Margo Price (Loma Vista Recordings)**; "Richmond on the James" – Alison Krauss & Union Station (Down the Road Records); "Good News" – Shaboozey (American Dogwood / EMPIRE); Songbird – Waylon Jennings (Son of Jessi); Ain't in It for My Health – Zach Top (Leo33 / Firebird Music) | **"I Like It Like That" – Fcukers (Ninja Tune)**; Stardust – Danny Brown (Warp Records); Switcheroo – Gelli Haha (Innovative Leisure); Yes, Please. – Sextile (Sacred Bones Records); Club Shy Room 2 – Shygirl (Because Music) |
| Best Electronic Record | Best Folk Record |
| **choke enough – Oklou (True Panther Records)**; Día – Ela Minus (Domino); The Last Sound on Earth – Helado Negro (Big Dada / Ninja Tune); Tranquilizer – Oneohtrix Point Never (Warp Records); The BPM – Sudan Archives (Stones Throw Records) | **Now Would Be a Good Time – Folk Bitch Trio (Jagjaguwar)**; Foxes in the Snow – Jason Isbell (Southeastern Records); Blurrr – Joanne Robertson (AD 93); Fatal Optimist – Madi Diaz (Anti-); Planting by the Signs – S.G. Goodman (Slough Water Records) |
| Best Global Record | Best Heavy Record |
| **Tears of Injustice – Mdou Moctar (Matador Records)**; Journey Through Life – Femi Kuti (Partisan Records); La Belleza – Lido Pimienta (Anti-); Mulatu Plays Mulatu – Mulatu Astatke (Strut Records); Another Place – Pachyman (ATO Records) | **Pirouette – Model/Actriz (True Panther Records)**; I Don't Want to See You in Heaven – The Callous Daoboys (MNRK Music Group); Vaxis – Act III: The Father of Make Believe – Coheed and Cambria (Coheed and Cambria); Something to Consume – Die Spitz (Third Man Records); ...Is Your Friend – Drain (Epitaph); Lotto – They Are Gutting a Body of Water (ATO Records); 45 Pounds – YHWH Nailgun (AD 93) |
| Best Hip-Hop/Rap Record | Best Jazz Record |
| **Let God Sort Em Out – Clipse (Self-released)**; Black Hole Superette – Aesop Rock (Rhymesayers Entertainment); Golliwog – Billy Woods (Backwoodz Studioz / Rhymesayers Entertainment); Alfredo 2 – Freddie Gibbs & The Alchemist (ESGN LLC); Black British Music (2025) – Jim Legxacy (XL Recordings); Like a Ribbon – John Glacier (Young); "Slime is Bestie" – Shygirl featuring JT & Sega Bodega (Because Music) | **Animaru – Mei Semones (Bayonet Records)**; Trilogy 3 – Chick Corea, Christian McBride & Brian Blade (Candid Records); Apple Cores – James Brandon Lewis (Anti-); Cream – Kassa Overall (Warp Records); For Dinah – Ledisi (Candid Records); New Dawn – Marshall Allen (Mexican Summer); Keys to the City Volume One – Robert Glasper (Loma Vista Recordings); Southern Nights – Sullivan Fortner (Artwork) |
| Best Latin Record | Best Outlier Record |
| **La Belleza – Lido Pimienta (Anti-)**; Boleros Psicodélicos II – Adrian Quesada (ATO Records); "Sola" – Arca (XL Recordings); Se Amaba Así – Buscabulla (Domino); Mvd Luv – Juan Wauters (Captured Tracks); "Voy Creciendo" – Rubio (FAMA Collective); Pequena Vertigem de Amor – Sessa (Mexican Summer) | **Sinister Grift – Panda Bear (Domino)**; You're Weird Now – Guerilla Toss (Sub Pop); The Universe Smiles Upon You ii – Khruangbin (Dead Oceans); Time Indefinite – William Tyler (Psychic Hotline); Yours, with Malice – Youth Code (Sumerian Records) |
| Best Pop Record | Best Punk Record |
| **choke enough – Oklou (True Panther Records)**; Who Is the Sky? – David Byrne (Matador Records); Girl Violence – King Princess (section 1); West End Girl – Lily Allen (BMG); Glory – Perfume Genius (Matador Records); "Dopamine" – Robyn (Young) | **Who Let the Dogs Out – Lambrini Girls (City Slang)**; "Well, Whatever It Was" – Joyce Manor (Epitaph); Adventure Club – Laura Jane Grace (Polyvinyl Record Co.); Are We All Angels – Scowl (Dead Oceans); Worldwide – Snõõper (Third Man Records); I'm Nice Now – Upchuck (Domino) |
| Best R&B Record | Best Rock Record |
| **"Children of the Baked Potato" – Thundercat featuring Remi Wolf (Brainfeeder)**; "A Flex" – Dawn Richard (Merge Records); Hooke's Law – keiyaA (XL Recordings); In the Blue Light – Kelela (Warp Records); "Everybody Gets Down" – NxWorries (Stones Throw Records); "do it afraid" – Yaya Bey (drink sum wtr) | **Bleeds – Wednesday (Dead Oceans)**; If You Asked for a Picture – Blondshell (Partisan Records); "It's Amazing to Be Young" – Fontaines D.C. (XL Recordings); Ego Death at a Bachelorette Party – Hayley Williams (Post Atlantic); Phantom Island – King Gizzard & the Lizard Wizard (p(doom) records); Welcome to My Blue Sky – Momma (Polyvinyl Record Co.); R Is for Rocket – Rocket (Transgressive Records / Canvasback) |
| Self-Released Record of the Year | Best Singer-Songwriter Record |
| **Ego Death at a Bachelorette Party – Hayley Williams (Post Atlantic)**; Charlotte de Witte – Charlotte de Witte (KNTXT); This Time Around – Colbie Caillat (Blue Jean Baby Records); Showbiz! – Mike (10k); The Sword & the Soaring – Navy Blue (Freedom Sounds); Salvation – Rebecca Black (Rebecca Black); Enough. – Snacktime (Self-Released) | **Luminescent Creatures – Ichiko Aoba (Psychic Hotline)**; **Tether – Annahstasia (drink sum wtr)**; Oblivion – Alice Phoebe Lou (Nettwerk Music Group); Cover the Mirrors – Ben Kweller (The Noise Company); "Crimson and Clay" – Jason Isbell (Southeastern Records); Fatal Optimist – Madi Diaz (Anti-); Animaru – Mei Semones (Bayonet Records) |
| Best Soul/Funk Record | Best Spiritual Record |
| **Sad and Beautiful World – Mavis Staples (Anti-)**; Heartache in Room 14 – The Altons (Daptone Records); Can't Lose My (Soul) – Annie and the Caldwells (Luaka Bop); Departures & Arrivals: Adventures of Captain Curt – Curtis Harding (Anti-); Flowers – Durand Jones & The Indications (Dead Oceans); Tuff Times Never Last – Kokoroko (Brownswood Recordings); Cut & Rewind – Say She She (drink sum wtr); The First Family: Live at Winchester Cathedral 1967 – Sly & the Family Stone (High Moon Records) | **Reconstruction – Lecrae (Reach Records)**; Llorón – Alexxander (Reach Records); The Prophet and the Madman – Ami Taf Ra (Brainfeeder); Solace of the Mind – Amina Claudine Myers (Red Hook Records); Soul Ecstasy – Chandrika Tandon (Soul Chants Music); Remix Meditation – Lil Jon & Kabir Sehgal (Tiger Turn); Another Mississippi Sunday Morning – Parchman Prison Prayer (Glitterbeat Records); Hallelujah! Don't Let the Devil Fool Ya – Robert Finley (Easy Eye Sound) |
| Best Sync Usage | Creative Packaging |
| **"mangetout" by Wet Leg in the series Heated Rivalry (Domino)**; "Days Move Slow" by Bully in the film I Know What You Did Last Summer (Sub Pop); "Why Can't I Touch It" by Buzzcocks in a commercial for Ross (Domino); "Me Myself and I" by De La Soul in the "Back to School" commercial for Target (A.O.I. Records / Reservoir); "King of Possibilities" by Goldie Boutilier in the series The Hunting Wives (ONErpm); "In Spite of Ourselves" by John Prine in the film Die My Love (Oh Boy Records); "Burning" by Yeah Yeah Yeahs in the "Driven" campaign for Lucid Motors (Secretly Canadian) | **Special Herbs – MF Doom (Rhymesayers Entertainment / Metalface Records)**; "Monster Rap" b/w "Frankenstein 1984" (Frankenstein-Shaped Vinyl) – Bobby "Boris" Pickett & Edgar Winter (Reservoir Recordings); Sable, Fable – Bon Iver (Jagjaguwar); Cuba and Beyond – Chucho Valdés & Royal Quartet (InnerJazz); Donuts (Audiophile Edition) – J Dilla (Stones Throw Records); Halloween: The Complete Expanded Collection – John Carpenter, Cody Carpenter & Daniel Davies (Sacred Bones Records) |
| Best Reissue | Best Remix |
| **Special Herbs – MF Doom (Rhymesayers Entertainment / Metalface Records)**; The Best of Everything but the Girl – Everything but the Girl (Buzzin' Fly / Chrysalis Records); Flora – Hiroshi Yoshimura (Temporal Drift); The Execution of All Things (Frozen Lake Edition) – Rilo Kiley (Saddle Creek); Fire of God's Love – Sister Irene O'Connor (Freedom to Spend); Odessey and Oracle: Mono Remastered – The Zombies (Beechwood Park Records) | **"blade bird" (Nick León Broward Mix) – Oklou (True Panther Records)**; "QQQQ" (Nick León Apocalypto Remix) – Ela Minus (Domino); "Walking Away from My Demons" (Wet Leg Remix) – Faux Real (City Slang); "Satisfaction Skank" – Fatboy Slim & The Rolling Stones (Southern Fried Records / ABKCO Music & Records); "Mannequin Love" (The Dare Remix) – Justice (Ed Banger); "Cuntology 101" (Peaches Remix) – Lambrini Girls (City Slang); "Conocerla" – Reyna Tropical / Amantes del Futuro (Psychic Hotline) |
| Music Video of the Year | Marketing Genius |
| **"viscus" – Oklou (True Panther Records)**; "So Be It" – Clipse (Clipse); "Throw Yourself to the Sword" – Die Spitz (Third Man Records); "Taxes" – Geese (Partisan Records / Play It Again Sam); "Elderberry Wine" – Wednesday (Dead Oceans); "catch these fists" – Wet Leg (Domino) | **Getting Killed – Geese (Partisan Records / Play It Again Sam)**; Because Beaubourg – Because Music (Because Music); Let God Sort Em Out – Clipse (Self-released); Ego Death at a Bachelorette Party – Hayley Williams (Post Atlantic); Special Herbs – MF Doom (Rhymesayers Entertainment / Metalface Records); Bleeds – Wednesday (Dead Oceans); We'll Never Stop Living This Way: A Ghostly International Catalogue (Ghostly International) |
| Best Record from Games and Interactive Media | Independent Record Store of the Year |
| **Minecraft: Alpha + Beta (Box Set) – C418 (Ghostly International)**; Call of Duty: Black Ops 7 (Original Soundtrack) – Gracie LeClere & Jack Wall (Activision); Eclipsium (Original Soundtrack) – Hudson Bikichky (Materia Collective); Clair Obscur: Expedition 33 (Original Soundtrack) – Lorien Testard (Laced Records); "Everything Burns" – Tom Morello featuring Beartooth (Mom+Pop); Arcane League of Legends: Season 2 Original Soundtrack (Extended Edition) – Various Artists (Riot Games) | **Rough Trade NYC**; Amoeba Music; The Electric Fetus; Grimey's New & Preloved Music; Music Millennium; Plaid Room Records; Turntable Lab; Waterloo Records |
| Independent Champion | Label of the Year (Big) |
| **Qobuz**; AudioSalad; DISCO; FaroLatino; Light in the Attic; TuneCore | **Partisan Records**; Ghostly International; Loma Vista Recordings; Merge Records; Ninja Tune; Polyvinyl Record Co.; Sacred Bones Records; Sub Pop Records; Stones Throw Records; Third Man Records; Warp Records |
| Label of the Year (Medium) | Label of the Year (Small) |
| **Mexican Summer**; Arts & Crafts; Brownswood Recordings; Captured Tracks; Fat Possum Records; Light in the Attic; Mass Appeal; Run for Cover Records; Secret City Records; Sumerian Records | **True Panther Records**; Bayonet Records; Brainfeeder; Colemine Records; Daptone Records; Oh Boy Records; Psychic Hotline; RVNG Intl.; Saddle Creek; Wax Bodega |
| Publisher of the Year | Distributor of the Year |
| **Secretly Publishing**; Beggars Music; Downtown Music Publishing; Reservoir; Sub Pop Publishing; Warp Publishing | **Secretly Distribution**; AudioSalad; FUGA; IDOL; Light in the Attic; The Orchard; Redeye Worldwide; Symphonic Distribution; Virgin Music Group |

=== Lifetime Achievement Award ===
- **Terry McBride and Mark Jowett (Founders of Nettwerk Music Group)**
