= 2024 Libera Awards =

2024 edition of award ceremony

- Date: June 10, 2024
- Location: Gotham Hall, New York City, United States
- Presented by: American Association of Independent Music (A2IM)
- Most awards: De La Soul (3)
- Most nominations: Blondshell (5)
- Website: liberaawards.com

Television/radio coverage
- Network: YouTube

The 13th Libera Awards, also named 2024 Libera Awards, were held on June 10, 2024, at Gotham Hall in New York City, United States, presented by the American Association of Independent Music (A2IM) to recognize achievements in independent music on 2023.

The nominations were announced on March 20, 2024. American rock musician Blondshell led the nominations with five, followed by Mitski and De La Soul (both with four), and Killer Mike, Indigo De Souza, Jerry Garcia, Caroline Polachek and Wednesday, all with three each.

Three categories were introduced: Publisher of the Year, Distributor of the Year, and Best Record from Games and Interactive Media; increasing the number of competitive categories from thirty-seven to forty. Louis Posen, American record producer and founder of Hopeless Records, will be honoured with the Lifetime Achievement Award.

== Winners and nominees ==
The nominees were announced on March 20, 2024. Winners will be listed first and in bold.

Record of the Year	Breakthrough Artist/Release
**The Land Is Inhospitable and So Are We – Mitski (Dead Oceans)**; I Killed Your Dog – L'Rain (Mexican Summer); MICHAEL – Killer Mike (Loma Vista Recordings); Desire, I Want to Turn Into You – Caroline Polachek (Perpetual Novice); Rat Saw God – Wednesday (Dead Oceans)	**Blondshell (Partisan Records)**; BAMBII (Innovative Leisure); bar Italia (Matador Records); Indigo De Souza (Saddle Creek); Say She She (Colemine Records); Slow Pulp (Anti-); Wednesday (Dead Oceans)
Best Alternative Rock Record	Best American Roots Record
**Desire, I Want to Turn Into You – Caroline Polachek (Perpetual Novice)**; End of the Day – Courtney Barnett (Mom + Pop Music); 3D Country – Geese (Partisan Records); Cartwheel – Hotline TNT (Third Man Records); The Land Is Inhospitable and So Are We – Mitski (Dead Oceans); Rat Saw God – Wednesday (Dead Oceans)	**"Rudolph" – MJ Lenderman (Anti-)**; The Man From Waco Redux – Charley Crockett (Son of Davy / Thirty Tigers); "Don't Do Me Good" – Madi Diaz featuring Kacey Musgraves (Anti-); Jump for Joy – Hiss Golden Messenger (Merge Records); Safe to Run – Esther Rose (New West Records); The Returner – Allison Russell (Fantasy Records)
Best Blues Record	Best Classical Record
**Live In London – Christone "Kingfish" Ingram (Alligator Records)**; Basie Swings the Blues – The Count Basie Orchestra (Candid Records); Black Bayou – Robert Finley (Easy Eye Sound); LaVette! – Bettye LaVette (Jay-Vee Records / MRI); Tell Everybody! (21st Century Juke Joint Blues From Easy Eye Sound) – Various Artists (Easy Eye Sound); The Fooler – Nick Waterhouse (Innovative Leisure)	**Philanthropy – Hauschka (City Slang)**; Sardinia – Chick Corea & Orchestra da Camera della Sardegna (Candid Records); Bewondering – Doeke (Nettwerk Music Group); Love at Last – Lara Downes (Pentatone); Canto Ostinato – Erik Hall (Western Vinyl); The Dunbar/Moore Sessions: Vol. I – Will Liverman (Lexicon Classics); Vesela – Kelly Moran (Warp Records)
Best Country Record	Best Dance Record
**Strays – Margo Price (Loma Vista Recordings)**; Rhinestone Tomboy – Mya Byrne (Kill Rock Stars); Along the Way – Colbie Caillat (Blue Jean Baby Records / Downtown Artist & Label Services); You Know Who – The Pink Stones (Normaltown Records); Sweet Western Sound – Tanya Tucker (Fantasy Records); A Cat in the Rain – Turnpike Troubadours (Bossier City Records / Thirty Tigers)	**Mid Air – Romy (Young)**; MYCELiUM – Aluna (Mad Decent); Step by Step (Remixes) – Braxe + Falcon (Smugglers Way / Domino Recording Company); Guy – Jayda G (Ninja Tune); Light Places – LP Giobbi (Counter Records / Ninja Tune); "(It Goes Like) Nanana" – Peggy Gou (XL Recordings); Set the Roof – Hudson Mohawke & Nikki Nair (Warp Records)
Best Electronic Record	Best Folk Record
**With a Hammer – Yaeji (XL Recordings)**; "Birth4000" – Floating Points (Ninja Tune); Madres – Sofia Kourtesis (Ninja Tune); Slugs of Love – Little Dragon (Ninja Tune); Flaws In Our Design – ODESZA, Yellow House (Foreign Family Collective / Ninja Tune); Good Lies – Overmono (XL Recordings); Action Adventure – DJ Shadow (Mass Appeal Records)	**Javelin – Sufjan Stevens (Asthmatic Kitty)**; The Greater Wings – Julie Byrne (Ghostly International); "Dysphoria Hoodie" – Laura Jane Grace (Polyvinyl Record Co.); Why Does the Earth Give Us People to Love? – Kara Jackson (September Recordings); Age of Apathy Solo Sessions – Aoife O'Donovan (Yep Roc Records); Norm – Andy Shauf (Anti-); Anarchist Gospel – Sunny War (New West Records)
Best Global Record	Best Heavy Record
**Zango – WITCH (Desert Daze Sound)**; Aşk – Altin Gün (ATO Records); Work of Art – Asake (YBNL Nation / EMPIRE); Sahel – Bombino (Partisan Records); Switched-On – Pachyman (ATO Records); As Above, So Below (Deluxe) – Sampa the Great (Loma Vista Recordings)	**Dogsbody – Model/Actriz (True Panther Sounds)**; The Surface – Beartooth (Red Bull Records); God Smiles Upon the Callous Daoboys – The Callous Daoboys (MNRK Music Group); Blackout – From Ashes to New (Better Noise Music); One Day – Fucked Up (Merge Records); "If I Speak (Shut the Fuck Up)" – Soul Glo (Epitaph); A New Tomorrow – Zulu (Flatspot Records)
Best Hip-Hop/Rap Record	Best Jazz Record
**MICHAEL – Killer Mike (Loma Vista Recordings)**; Integrated Tech Solutions – Aesop Rock (Rhymesayers Entertainment); So Many Other Realities Exist Simultaneously – Atmosphere (Rhymesayers Entertainment); Quaranta – Danny Brown (Warp Records); Won't He Do It – Conway the Machine (Drumwork Music Group LLC / EMPIRE); Beloved! Paradise! Jazz!? – McKinley Dixon (City Slang); REAL B*TCHES DON’T DIE! – Kari Faux (drink sum wtr); Maps – billy woods & Kenny Segal (Backwoodz Studios/Fat Possum Records)	**Blowout – John Carroll Kirby (Stones Throw Records)**; Continuance – Joey Alexander (Mack Avenue Music Group); Some Unused Songs – Louis Cole (Brainfeeder); AUDIOBOOK – Sam Gendel & Marcella Cytrynowicz (Psychic Hotline); In December – Robert Glasper (Loma Vista Recordings); Prime – Christian McBride's New Jawn (Mack Avenue Music Group)
Best Latin Record	Best Outlier Record
**"LFO (Lupe Finds Oliveros)" – Helado Negro (4AD)**; Strata – El Búho (Wonderwheel Recordings); João – Bebel Gilberto ([PIAS]); "Todo Fue Por Amor (de la película "Con Esta Luz")" – Carla Morrison (Cosmica Artists); Habita – Pahua (Nacional Records); Tanto – Tagua Tagua (Wonderwheel Recordings)	**I Killed Your Dog – L'Rain (Mexican Summer)**; The King – Anjimile (4AD); My Back Was a Bridge for You to Cross – Anohni and the Johnsons (Secretly Canadian); Live at Sydney Opera House – Khruangbin (Dead Oceans); trip9love...??? – Tirzah (Domino Recording Company); softscars – yeule (Ninja Tune)
Best Pop Record	Best Punk Record
**Honey – Samia (Grand Jury Music)**; Late Developers – Belle and Sebastian (Matador Records); CHAI – CHAI (Sub Pop); Left Hand – Becca Mancari (Captured Tracks); "To Love" – Suki Waterhouse (Sub Pop)	**"I Got Heaven" – Mannequin Pussy (Epitaph)**; Taken by Force – CIVIC (ATO Records); "Take Me With You" – Neck Deep (Hopeless Records); Psychic Dance Routine – Scowl (Flatspot Records); Super Snõõper – Snõõper (Third Man Records); "If I Speak (Shut the Fuck Up)" – Soul Glo (Epitaph)
Best Record from Games and Interactive Media	Best R&B Record
**"Hateful" from Ultrakill – HEALTH (Loma Vista Recordings)**; The Lamplighters League (Original Soundtrack) – Jon Everist (Lakeshore Records); Pizza Tower – Mr. Sauceman, ClascyJitto, Post Elvis (Materia Collective); Prison City Original Soundtrack – Matt Creamer, Retroware, Professor Shyguy featuring Nur-D (Screenwave Media)	**Lahai – Sampha (Young)**; Special Occasion – Emily King (ATO Records); How Were We to Know – Emeli Sandé (Chrysalis Records); Falling or Flying – Jorja Smith (FAMM Limited); Gold – Cleo Sol (Forever Living Originals/TuneCore); Water Made Us – Jamila Woods (Jagjaguwar)
Best Rock Record	Best Singer-Songwriter Record
**Blondshell – Blondshell (Partisan Records)**; Mommy – Be Your Own Pet (Third Man Records); Weathervanes – Jason Isbell and the 400 Unit (Southeastern Records); The Valley of Vision – Manchester Orchestra (Loma Vista Recordings); First Two Pages of Frankenstein – The National (4AD); In Times New Roman... – Queens of the Stone Age (Matador Records); The Window – Ratboys (Topshelf Records)	**Forever Means – Angel Olsen (Jagjaguwar)**; All of This Will End – Indigo De Souza (Saddle Creek); "Same Risk" – Madi Diaz (Anti-); Time Ain't Accidental – Jess Williamson (Mexican Summer); Avalanche – Jenny Owen Youngs (Yep Roc Records)
Best Soul/Funk Record	Best Spiritual Record
**Crashin' from Passion – Betty Davis (Light in the Attic)**; Chronicles of a Diamond – Black Pumas (ATO Records); Black Bayou – Robert Finley (Easy Eye Sound); Francis Comes Alive – Neal Francis (ATO Records); Silver – Say She She (Colemine Records)	**Echoes of the South – The Blind Boys of Alabama (Single Lock Records)**; "Your Power" – Lecrae featuring Tasha Cobbs Leonard (Reach Records); Jesus Changed My Life – Katy Nichole (Centricity Music); Beatitudes – J Rocc (Stones Throw Records); Space-Time Dreamtime – Lori Vambe (STRUT)
Best Sync Usage	Creative Packaging
**"New Noise" by Refused in The Bear (Season 2) (Epitaph)**; "Stay" by Cat Power in Past Lives film trailer (Domino Recording Company); "Stay High" by Brittany Howard featuring Childish Gambino in You People (ATO Records); "Anything" by Sharon Van Etten in Priscilla film trailer (Jagjaguwar); "Midnight Sun" by Nilüfer Yanya in The Boogeyman (ATO Records)	**3 Feet High and Rising – De La Soul (AOI Records / Chrysalis Records)**; Blackbox Life Recorder 21f / In a Room7 F760 – Aphex Twin (Warp Records); Heads and Tails: Vol. 1 – Jerry Garcia (Round Records); The Collected Works of Neutral Milk Hotel – Neutral Milk Hotel (Merge Records); The Oh Boy Singles Box Set – John Prine (Oh Boy Records); Sub Pop Singles Club Vol. 8 – Various Artists (Sub Pop)
Best Reissue	Best Remix
**3 Feet High and Rising – De La Soul (AOI Records / Chrysalis Records)**; Cymande – Cymande (Partisan Records); Guitar Romantic (Expanded and Remastered) – The Exploding Hearts (Third Man Records); Might As Well: A Round Records Retrospective – Jerry Garcia (Round Records); Southeastern – Jason Isbell (Southeastern Records / Thirty Tigers); The Collected Works of Neutral Milk Hotel – Neutral Milk Hotel (Merge Records)	**"Selfish Soul (ODESZA Remix)" – Sudan Archives, ODESZA (Stones Throw Records under exclusive license to Foreign Family Collective / Ninja Tune)**; "To Be Honest (SG Lewis Remix)" – Christine and the Queens (Because Music); "I Remember (John Summit Remix)" – John Summit, deadmau5, Kaskade (mau5trap); Garcia (Remixed) – Jerry Garcia & LP Giobbi (Round Records); "Change of Heart" – Margo Price featuring Sierra Ferrell (Loma Vista Recordings)
Music Video of the Year	Best Short-Form Video
**"Dancer" – IDLES (Partisan Records)**; "More Than A Love Song" – Black Pumas (ATO Records); "Salad" – Blondshell (Partisan Records); "Younger & Dumber" – Indigo De Souza (Saddle Creek); "Cowboy Nudes" – Geese (Partisan Records); "Blades" – Arlo Parks (Transgressive Records); "Heaven" – Shygirl featuring Tinashe (Because Music)	**"Grace" teaser – IDLES (Partisan Records)**; "Kiss City" – Blondshell (Partisan Records); Tribute to Dave – De La Soul (AOI Records / Chrysalis Records); "Oropendola" – John Carroll Kirby (Stones Throw Records); The Land Is Inhospitable and So Are We – Mitski (Dead Oceans)
Marketing Genius	Self-Released Record of the Year
**De La Soul – De La Soul Catalog Release (AOI Records / Chrysalis Records)**; Blonde Redhead – Sit Down for Dinner (section1); Blondshell – Blondshell (Partisan Records); Peggy Gou – "(It Goes Like) Nanana" (XL Recordings); Killer Mike – MICHAEL (Loma Vista Recordings); Mitski – The Land Is Inhospitable and So Are We (Dead Oceans)	**Desire, I Want to Turn Into You – Caroline Polachek (Perpetual Novice)**; Atlas – Laurel Halo (Awe); "Fuck Ron DeSantis" – L'Queer (L'Queer); It Will Never Be The Same – Michigander (C3 Records); MID AIR – Paris Texas (Paris Texas LLC); "Video Games" – Tenacious D (Tenacious D)
Independent Champion	Label of the Year (Big)
**Bandcamp**; Downtown Music Holdings; Infinite Catalog; Light in the Attic; Peanut Butter Wolf; Jorge Brea; Thirty Tigers	**Partisan Records**; Dead Oceans; Domino Recording Company; Hopeless Records; Matador Records; Merge Records; Sub Pop Records; Third Man Records
Label of the Year (Medium)	Label of the Year (Small)
**Light in the Attic**; Captured Tracks; City Slang; Lex Records; Mack Avenue Music Group; Photo Finish Records; Saddle Creek	**True Panther Sounds**; Bastard Jazz Recordings; Bayonet Records; FADER Label; Innovative Leisure; Oh Boy Records; Topshelf Records
Publisher of the Year	Distributor of the Year
**Secretly Publishing**; Arts & Crafts Music; Domino Publishing Company; Reservoir Media; Rimas Publishing; Sub Pop Publishing; Warp Publishing	**Redeye Worldwide**; FUGA; Light in the Attic; The Orchard; idSecretly Distribution; Symphonic Distribution; Virgin Music Group
Special Awards
