= 2025 Libera Awards =

Annual US music awards ceremony

- Date: June 9, 2025
- Location: Gotham Hall, New York City, United States
- Presented by: American Association of Independent Music (A2IM)
- Hosted by: Delisa Shannon
- Most awards: Jessica Pratt and MF Doom (3)
- Most nominations: MJ Lenderman (6)
- Website: liberaawards.com

The 14th Libera Awards, also named 2025 Libera Awards, were held on June 9, 2025, at Gotham Hall in New York City, United States, presented by the American Association of Independent Music (A2IM) to recognize achievements in independent music in 2024.

The nominations were announced on March 19, 2025. American musician MJ Lenderman led the nominations with six, followed by Waxahatchee with five, and Jessica Pratt and MF Doom, both with four nods each.

The ceremony was hosted by Billboard's content producer Delisa Shannon, and included performances by Swamp Dogg, serpentwithfeet, Ekko Astral, and Reyna Tropical. German music executive producer Horst Weidenmüller received the Lifetime Achievement Award posthumously. Jessica Pratt and MF Doom were the most awarded artists with three wins each, followed by MJ Lenderman and Fontaines D.C. with two awards apiece.

== Winners and nominees ==
The nominees were announced on March 19, 2025. Winners are listed first and in bold.

Record of the Year	Breakthrough Artist/Release
**Here in the Pitch – Jessica Pratt (Mexican Summer)**; The Collective – Kim Gordon (Matador Records); Manning Fireworks – MJ Lenderman (ANTI-); "Rockman" – Mk.gee (R&R); Tigers Blood – Waxahatchee (ANTI-)	**MJ Lenderman (ANTI-)**; Jessica Pratt (Mexican Summer); Magdalena Bay (Mom+Pop); Mannequin Pussy (Epitaph); Mk.gee (R&R); Shaboozey (American Dogwood / EMPIRE)
Best Alternative Rock Record	Best American Roots Record
**The Collective – Kim Gordon (Matador Records)**; Eels – Being Dead (Bayonet Records); Nobody Loves You More – Kim Deal (4AD); Moon Mirror – Nada Surf (New West Records); Wild God – Nick Cave & The Bad Seeds (Play It Again Sam)	**Manning Fireworks – MJ Lenderman (ANTI-)**; TexiCali – Dave Alvin + Jimmie Dale Gilmore (Yep Roc Records); Son of a Broken Man – Fantastic Negrito (Storefront Records); Woodland – Gillian Welch & David Rawlings (Acony Records); Driven to Drive – Joe Ely (Rack 'Em Records); Blackgrass – Swamp Dogg (Oh Boy Records)
Best Blues Record	Best Classical Record
**Mileage – Ruthie Foster (Sun Records)**; Hill Country Love – Cedric Burnside (Provogue Records); Sam's Place – Little Feat (Hot Tomato Records); Blame It On Eve – Shemekia Copeland (Alligator Records); Swingin' Live at the Church in Tulsa – The Taj Mahal Sextet (Lightning Rod Records)	**Moves in the Field – Kelly Moran (Warp Records)**; Wolfgang Amadeus Mozart: Requiem – Ensemble Pygmalion, Raphaël Pichon (Harmonia Mundi); XX: 20th Anniversary Album – Il Divo (Il Divo Music); Britten: Violin Concerto and Chamber Works – Isabelle Faust (Harmonia Mundi); Monad – Ju-Ping Song (Starkland); Olivier Messiaen: Turangalîla-Symphonie – Marc-André Hamelin, Nathalie Forget, Toronto Symphony Orchestra, Gustavo Gimeno (Harmonia Mundi); Bloom – Michael Torke (Ecstatic Records)
Best Country Record	Best Dance Record
**Tigers Blood – Waxahatchee (ANTI-)**; El Viejo – Corb Lund (New West Records); American Spirit – Fancy Hagood (Fancy Hagood Enterprises); Passage du Desir – Johnny Blue Skies (High Top Mountain Records); Where I've Been, Isn't Where I'm Going – Shaboozey (American Dogwood / EMPIRE); Cold Beer & Country Music – Zach Top (Leo33)	Baggy$$ – Fcukers (Technicolour / Ninja Tune); Britpop – A. G. Cook (New Alias); I Hear You – Peggy Gou (XL Recordings); Club Shy – Shygirl (Because Music); Sophie – Sophie (Future Classic)
Best Electronic Record	Best Folk Record
**Honey – Caribou (Merge Records)**; Cascade – Floating Points (Ninja Tune); Spirit Box – Flying Lotus (Warp Records); In Waves – Jamie xx (Young); Hyperdrama – Justice (Because Music); Windswept – Photay (Mexican Summer)	**Here in the Pitch – Jessica Pratt (Mexican Summer)**; Bright Future – Adrianne Lenker (4AD); All My Friends – Aoife O'Donovan (Yep Roc Records); Keep Me on Your Mind/See You Free – Bonny Light Horseman (Jagjaguwar); Weird Faith – Madi Diaz (ANTI-)
Best Global Record	Best Heavy Record
**Funeral for Justice – Mdou Moctar (Matador Records)**; "Vallahi Yok" – Altın Gün (ATO Records); Lungu Boy – Asake (YBNL Nation / EMPIRE); Harvest – BALTHVS (Mixto Records); Mahal – Glass Beams (Ninja Tune); Sonido Cósmico – Hermanos Gutiérrez (Easy Eye Sound); Viva Tu – Manu Chao (Because Music)	**Up On Gravity Hill – METZ (Sub Pop Records)**; She Reaches Out to She Reaches Out to She – Chelsea Wolfe (Loma Vista Recordings); Cometh the Storm – High on Fire (MNRK Music Group); Hot Singles in Your Area – Scene Queen (Hopeless Records); Only One Mode – Speed (FLATSPOT)
Best Hip-Hop/Rap Record	Best Jazz Record
**"Immaculate" – Shygirl featuring Saweetie (Because Music)**; Take Care – BigXthaPlug (UnitedMasters); Play Cash Cobain – Cash Cobain (Giant Music); The Auditorium Vol. 1 – Common & Pete Rock (Loma Vista Recordings); King of the Mischievous South – Denzel Curry (Loma Vista Recordings); Revelator – Elucid (Fat Possum Records)	**Fearless Movement – Kamasi Washington (Young)**; **Endlessness – Nala Sinephro (Warp Records)**; Mid Spiral – BADBADNOTGOOD (XL Recordings); Dance, No One's Watching – Ezra Collective (Partisan Records); Phoenix Reimagined – Lakecia Benjamin (Ropeadope Records); Tales of the Facade – Morgan Guerin (Candid Records); Odyssey – Nubya Garcia (Concord Jazz)
Best Latin Record	Best Outlier Record
**Malegría – Reyna Tropical (Psychic Hotline)**; Gemelo – Angélica Garcia (Partisan Records); "11:11" – Buscabulla (Domino Recording Company); "Era Primavera" – Chicano Batman (ATO Records); Alkemi – Daymé Arocena (Brownswood Recordings); "Alma Florecida" – Gaby Moreno and La Lom (Cosmica Artists); blush – Girl Ultra (Big Dada / Ninja Tune)	**A la Sala – Khruangbin (Dead Oceans)**; **You'll Have to Lose Something – The Spirit of the Beehive (Saddle Creek Records)**; Your Day Will Come – Chanel Beads (Jagjaguwar); Quiet in a World Full of Noise – Dawn Richard & Spencer Zahn (Merge Records); Mahōgakkō – Hakushi Hasegawa (Brainfeeder); Phasor – Helado Negro (4AD); The Great Bailout – Moor Mother (ANTI-); Big Smile, Black Mire – urika's bedroom (True Panther Sounds)
Best Pop Record	Best Punk Record
**Imaginal Disk – Magdalena Bay (Mom+Pop)**; 9 Sad Symphonies – Kate Nash (Kill Rock Stars); "Joyride" – Kesha; Young-Girl Forever – Sofie Royer (Stones Throw Records); SOPHIE – SOPHIE (Future Classic); Memoir of a Sparklemuffin – Suki Waterhouse (Sub Pop Records)	**Half Divorced – Pissed Jeans (Sub Pop Records)**; Synthesizer – A Place To Bury Strangers (Dedstrange); And Then There Was... – Chubby and the Gang (FLATSPOT); Pink Balloons – Ekko Astral (Topshelf Records); Hole in My Head – Laura Jane Grace (Polyvinyl Record Co.); Letter to Self – Sprints (City Slang)
Best R&B Record	Best Rock Record
**"Worthy" – Mavis Staples (ANTI-)**; Still – Erika de Casier (4AD); Moth – Fana Hues (Bright Antenna Records); Why Lawd? – NxWorries (Anderson .Paak & Knxwledge) (Stones Throw Records); Grip – serpentwithfeet (Secretly Canadian); Ten Fold – Yaya Bey (Big Dada / Ninja Tune)	**Romance – Fontaines D.C. (XL Recordings)**; Tangk – Idles (Partisan Records); No Name – Jack White (Third Man Records); I Got Heaven – Mannequin Pussy (Epitaph); A Dream Is All We Know – The Lemon Twigs (Captured Tracks); No Obligation – The Linda Lindas (Epitaph)
Self-Released Record of the Year	Best Singer-Songwriter Record
**"Genesis" – Raye (Human Re Sources)**; It's Sorted – Cheekface (Cheekface); American Spirit – Fancy Hagood (Fancy Hagood Enterprises); All Hell – Los Campesinos! (Heart Swells); Everybody Needs a Hero – Orla Gartland (New Friends Music); Fauxllennium – TV Girl & George Clanton (Blissful Serenity Industries, LLC)	**Here in the Pitch – Jessica Pratt (Mexican Summer)**; Bright Future – Adrianne Lenker (4AD); Paradise Pop. 10 – Christian Lee Hutson (ANTI-); Underdressed at the Symphony – Faye Webster (Secretly Canadian); "As Good as It Gets" – Katie Gavin (Saddest Factory Records); Patterns in Repeat – Laura Marling (Partisan Records / Chrysalis Records)
Best Soul/Funk Record	Best Spiritual Record
**Got a Story to Tell – Thee Sacred Souls (Daptone Records)**; Descanso – Angela Muñoz (Stones Throw Records); "Back It Up" – Neal Francis (ATO Records); Love Direction – The Dip (Dualtone Records); Sinseerly Yours – Thee Sinseers (Colemine Records)	**Rhapsody – The Harlem Gospel Travelers (Colemine Records)**; Brother John & The GFT Collective – Brother John (The Blues Preachers / The Orchard); Flock II – Flock (Strut); "Then I Will (from Boenhoffer)" – Lauren Daigle (Centricity Music); "Die for the Party" – Lecrae (Reach Records); Loving You – The Nelons (Daywind Records)
Best Sync Usage	Creative Packaging
**"Say No Go" by De La Soul in the film Civil War (A.O.I. / Chrysalis Records / Reservoir Records)**; "Nothing's Gonna Hurt You Baby" by Cigarettes After Sex in the film It Ends with Us (Partisan Records); "All You Children" by Jamie xx and The Avalanches in an Apple Inc. ad (Young); "The Way We Get By" by Spoon in the trailer for the film A Real Pain (Matador Records); "Right Back to It" by Waxahatchee featuring MJ Lenderman in the sixth episode "Lexington" of the first season of Tracker (ANTI-)	**MM..FOOD (20th Anniversary Edition) – MF Doom (Rhymesayers Entertainment)**; Selected Ambient Works Volume II (Expanded Edition) – Aphex Twin (Warp Records); A la Sala – Khruangbin (Dead Oceans); Salad Days 10 Year Anniversary Edition – Mac DeMarco (Captured Tracks); G Stands For Go-Betweens: Volume 3 – The Go-Betweens (Domino Recording Company); Sub Pop Singles Club Vol. 8 – Various Artists (Sub Pop Records)
Best Reissue	Best Remix
**MM..FOOD (20th Anniversary Edition) – MF Doom (Rhymesayers Entertainment)**; Planet Rock: The Album – Afrika Bambaataa & Soulsonic Force (Tommy Boy Records); American Football LP1 (25th Anniversary Edition) – American Football (Polyvinyl Record Co.); The Moon and the Melodies – Cocteau Twins & Harold Budd (4AD); Paris 1919 (Deluxe Edition) – John Cale (Domino Recording Company); Crying Time – Ray Charles (Tangerine Records); Sylvan Esso (10 Year Anniversary Edition) – Sylvan Esso (Psychic Hotline)	**"One Beer" (Madlib Remix) – MF Doom (Rhymesayers Entertainment)**; "Bon Bob" (Confidence Man Remix) – Fcukers (Technicolour / Ninja Tune); RAVE:N, The Remixes – Kelela (Warp Records); "Mr. Useless" (MK Remix) – Shygirl (Because Music); "Kisses" (Grouper Remix) – Slowdive (Dead Oceans)
Music Video of the Year	Marketing Genius
**"Starburster" – Fontaines D.C. (XL Recordings)**; "Mirrors" – Caravan Palace (Le Plan Recordings); "Neverender" – Justice & Tame Impala (Because Music); "Cheerleader" – Porter Robinson (Mom+Pop); "Right Back to It" – Waxahatchee featuring MJ Lenderman (ANTI-); "booboo" – Yaeji (XL Recordings)	**Tangk – Idles (Partisan Records)**; A la Sala – Khruangbin (Dead Oceans); MM..FOOD (20th Anniversary Edition) – MF Doom (Rhymesayers Entertainment); Manning Fireworks – MJ Lenderman (ANTI-); Tigers Blood – Waxahatchee (ANTI-)
Independent Champion	Label of the Year (Big)
**Bandcamp**; Infinite Catalog; Marauder; Qobuz; The Bloom Effect	**Partisan Records**; ANTI-; Dead Oceans; Mom+Pop; Ninja Tune; Stones Throw Records; Sub Pop Records; Warp Records
Label of the Year (Medium)	Label of the Year (Small)
**Mexican Summer**; Captured Tracks; City Slang; Fat Possum Records; Light in the Attic; Secret City Records	**True Panther**; Bayonet Records; Daptone Records; Oh Boy Records; Psychic Hotline; Topshelf Records
Publisher of the Year	Distributor of the Year
**Warp Publishing**; Beggars Music; Downtown Music Publishing; Reservoir; Secret City Publishing	**Redeye**; FUGA; IDOL; Secretly Distribution; Symphonic Distribution; The Orchard
Impact Award
**Where I've Been, Isn't Where I'm Going – Shaboozey (American Dogwood / Empire)**

=== Lifetime Achievement Award ===
- **Horst Weidenmüller**
