= Libera Award for Best Classical Record =

Annual US music award

- Awarded for: quality classical records
- Country: United States
- Presented by: American Association of Independent Music (A2IM)
- First award: 2018
- Currently held by: Dawn Richard and Spencer Zahn, Pigments (2023)
- Website: liberaawards.com

The Libera Award for Best Classical Record (known as Best Classical Album prior to 2021) is an award presented by the American Association of Independent Music at the annual Libera Award which recognizes "best classical music album released commercially in the United States by an independent label" since 2018.

Prior to the creation of the category, an award named Best Classical/World Album was presented, though it was only awarded in 2017.

It was first presented to the Detroit Symphony Orchestra, conducted by Leonard Slatkin, for the album Copland: Symphony No. 3 & 3 Latin American Sketches.

== Winners and nominees ==
Year	Winner(s)	Work	Nominees	Ref.
2018	Detroit Symphony Orchestra; Leonard Slatkin (conductor)	Copland: Symphony No. 3 & 3 Latin American Sketches	Endless – Luca D'Alberto; Novák: In the Tatra Mountains, Lady Godiva & Eternal Longing – Buffalo Philharmonic Orchestra; JoAnn Falletta (conductor); Open – Grandbrothers; Rachmaninov: Piano Concerto No. 2 - 8 Études-Tableaux, Op. 33 – Boris Giltburg; Royal Scottish National Orchestra; Carlos Miguel Prieto (conductor)	
2019	Jean-Michel Blais	Dans ma main	Fuchs: Piano Concerto "Spiritualist" – London Symphony Orchestra; John Luther Adams: Canticles of the Sky – Oliver Coates; Oceanic – Niklas Paschburg; Scripted Orkestra – Henrik Schwarz & Metropole Orkest	
2020	Beth Gibbons	Henryk Gorecki: Symphony No. 3 (Symphony Of Sorrowful Songs)	Animal Requiem – Rachel Fuller; John Jeter/Fort Smith Symphony - Symphonies 1 & 4 – Florence Price; Peaceful Piano – Paul Cardall; Triptych – Benny Gebert	
2021	Erik Hall	Music for 18 Musicians (Steve Reich)	Sanctuary Road – Paul Moravec; The See Within – Echo Collective; Svalbard – Niklas Paschburg; Vitamin String Quartet Performs Lana Del Rey – Vitamin String Quartet	
2022	Bryce Dessner, Australian String Quartet and Sydney Dance Company	Impermanence/Disintegration	All the Unknown – Grandbrothers; Canadiana – Canadian Brass; Our Flashback Wedding – Vitamin String Quartet; Piano Piano – Jeremiah Fraites; Sunbathing Through a Glass Screen – Theo Alexander	
2023	Dawn Richard and Spencer Zahn	Pigments	We Will Live On – Deru; Memorie – Doeke; Invisible Forces – James Heather; At the Crest – Jonas Colstrup; Lost & Found – Sean Shibe	

== Artists that received multiple nominations ==
2 nominations

- Grandbrothers
- Niklas Paschburg
- Vitamin String Quartet
