= 2020 Libera Awards =

Annual US music awards ceremony

- Date: July 18, 2020
- Presented by: A2IM
- Hosted by: Chris Gethard
- Website: liberaawards.com

The 2020 Libera Awards was held on July 18, 2020 to recognize the best in independent music presented by the American Association of Independent Music. The nominations were announced on April 2, 2020 and the ceremony was streamed online due to the COVID-19 pandemic.

A number of new genre-specific awards were introduced, namely: Best Alternative Rock Album and Best Mainstream Rock Album, succeeding Best Rock Album; Best Folk/Bluegrass Album; and Best Punk/Emo Record.

2020 marked the first year that the award ceremony could be viewed by the public and featured an increased number of musical performances. Performers included Wyclef Jean, Shabazz Palaces, Salt Cathedral, Orville Peck, Y La Bamba, Sudan Archives, Julia Jacklin, Alejandro Escovedo, Suzanne Ciani, Big Thief, and IDLES. The show's livestream was hosted by comedian Chris Gethard with event proceeds going toward the Sweet Relief Musicians Fund.

== Winners and nominees ==
Album of the Year	Best Live Act
U.F.O.F. - Big Thief: Magdalene – FKA Twigs; All Mirrors – Angel Olsen; Jaime – Brittany Howard; Pony – Orville Peck	IDLES (Partisan Records): Flying Lotus (Warp Records); Courtney Barnett (Mom+Pop Music); Mavis Staples (Anti- Records); Fontaines D.C. (Partisan Records)
Best Alternative Rock Album	Best Americana Album
Dogrel - Fontaines D.C.: U.F.O.F. – Big Thief; All Mirrors – Angel Olsen; I Am Easy to Find – The National; Remind Me Tomorrow – Sharon Van Etten	The Unseen in Between - Steve Gunn: III – The Lumineers; Oklahoma – Keb' Mo'; Years to Burn – Calexico and Iron & Wine; Tip of the Sphere – Cass McCombs
Best Blues Album	Best Classical Album
We Get By - Mavis Staples: Kingfish – Christone Ingram; Ann Arbor Blues Festival 1969 Vol. 1 & 2 – Various Artists; Up and Rolling – North Mississippi Allstars; Tall, Dark and Handsome – Delbert McClinton and Self-Made Men	Henryk Gorecki: Symphony No. 3 (Symphony Of Sorrowful Songs) - Beth Gibbons: Peaceful Piano – Paul Cardall; John Jeter/Fort Smith Symphony - Symphonies 1 & 4 – Florence Price; Animal Requiem – Rachel Fuller; Triptych – Benny Gebert
Best Country Album	Best Dance/Electronic Album
Pony - Orville Peck: What It Is – Hayes Carll; Texas Piano Man – Robert Ellis; White Noise/White Lines – Kelsey Waldon; From Another World – Jim Lauderdale	Flamagra - Flying Lotus: Anima – Thom Yorke; PROTO – Holly Herndon; Weather – Tycho; A Bath Full of Ecstasy – Hot Chip
Best Folk/Bluegrass Album	Best Hip-Hop/Rap Album
Crushing - Julia Jacklin: Bird Songs of a KillJoy – Bedouine; Patty Griffin – Patty Griffin; Out of Sight – Jake Xerxes Fussell; Quiet Signs – Jessica Pratt	uknowhatimsayin¿ - Danny Brown: The Big Day – Chance the Rapper; There Existed an Addiction to Blood – Clipping; ZUU – Denzel Curry; Fever – Megan Thee Stallion
Best Indie Rock Album	Best Jazz Album
Titanic Rising - Weyes Blood: Jinx – Crumb; House of Sugar – (Sandy) Alex G; Anak Ko – Jay Som; Young Enough – Charly Bliss	Blume - Nerija: Waiting Game – Terri Lyne Carrington and Social Science; Spectrum – Hiromi; Hittin' The Ramp: The Early Years:1936-1943 – Nat King Cole; Musical Prophet: The Expanded 1963 New York Studio Sessions – Eric Dolphy; Evans In England – Bill Evans
Best Latin Album	Best Mainstream Rock Album
Mujeres - Y La Bamba: La Onda de Juan Pablo – Juan Wauters; Mettavolution – Rodrigo y Gabriela; A Tuba to Cuba – Preservation Hall Jazz Band; Sueños – Sech	Cry - Cigarettes After Sex: The Medicine Show – Melissa Etheridge; Help Us Stranger – The Raconteurs; Volumes 11 & 12 – The Desert Sessions; Hear Me Out – Reignwolf
Best Metal Album	Best Outlier Album
Infest the Rats' Nest - King Gizzard & the Lizard Wizard: LφVE & EVφL – Boris; Death Atlas – Cattle Decapitation; Metal Galaxy – Babymetal; Periphery IV: Hail Stan – Periphery	Reward - Cate Le Bon: Fishing for Fishies – King Gizzard & the Lizard Wizard; Thank You, Mister Rogers: Music & Memories – Various Artists; No Home Record – Kim Gordon; Miami Memory – Alex Cameron
Best Punk/Emo Album	Best R&B Album
Amyl and the Sniffers - Amyl and the Sniffers: Hello Exile – The Menzingers; Active Listening: Night On Earth – Empath; American Football (LP3) – American Football; Age of Unreason – Bad Religion	Athena - Sudan Archives: Magdalene – FKA Twigs; Angel's Pulse – Blood Orange; Legacy! Legacy! – Jamila Woods; American Love Call – Durand Jones & The Indications
Best Re-Issue	Best Sync Usage
2019 Reissue Campaign - Stereolab: Kankyō Ongaku: Japanese Ambient, Environmental & New Age Music 1980-1990 – Various Artists; Modern Sounds In Country and Western Music, Volumes 1&2 – Ray Charles; Acoustic Foolish – Superchunk; Music Of Many Colours – Fela Kuti	Partisan Records for the usage of Idles' "Never Fight A Man With a Perm" and "I'm Scum" in Peaky Blinders: Jagjaguwar for the usage of Bon Iver's "Naeem" in Nike 'Beginnings: LeBron'; Young Turks for the usage of Kamasi Washington's music in Apple Shot on iPhone XS commercial; Matador Records for the usage of Perfume Genius' "Otherside" in The Goldfinch trailer; Partisan Records for the usage of Cigarettes After Sex's "Opera House" in Killing Eve
Best World Album	Breakthrough Artist/Release
Amadjar - Tinariwen: Afrowave 3 – Afro B; Blue Stage Sessions – Mdou Moctar; Dépaysé – Sinkane; Gece – Altin Gün	Orville Peck: Sudan Archives; Black Pumas; Fontaines D.C.; Julia Jacklin
Creative Packaging	Independent Champion
Flamagra - Flying Lotus: VMP Anthology: The Story Of Ghostly International – Various Artists; WXAXRXP Boxset – Various Artists; Sub Pop Singles Club – Various Artists; A Beautiful Thing: IDLES Live at Le Bataclan – IDLES	Bandcamp: SoundExchange; Spotify; Redeye; The Orchard
Label of the Year (Large)	Label of the Year (Medium)
Partisan Records: Jagjaguwar; Polyvinyl Record Co.; Domino Recording Company; Warp	Sacred Bones: 4AD; ATO Records; Saddle Creek; Drag City
Label of the Year (Small)	Marketing Genius
Father/Daughter Records: Innovative Leisure; Oh Boy Records; Hardly Art; Wichita Recordings	"Hot Girl Summer" - Megan Thee Stallion: Anima – Thom Yorke; Magdalene – FKA Twigs; Schlagenheim – black midi; Better Oblivion Community Center – Better Oblivion Community Center
Video of the Year	
"Cellophane" - FKA Twigs: "The Barrel" – Aldous Harding; "More" – Flying Lotus; "Dead of Night" – Orville Peck; "Big" – Fontaines D.C.	

=== Most nominations ===
- Fontaines D.C. – 4
- Flying Lotus – 4
- Orville Peck – 4

=== Most wins ===
- IDLES – 2
- Flying Lotus – 2
- Orville Peck – 2

== Special awards ==
Independent Icon Award

- Alejandro Escovedo
- Suzanne Ciani
- John Prine

A2IM Lifetime Achievement Award

- Seymour Stein
