= Libera Award for Best Live Act =

Annual US music award

- Country: United States
- Presented by: American Association of Independent Music (A2IM)
- First award: 2013
- Currently held by: Low (2023)
- Website: liberaawards.com

The Libera Award for Best Live/Livestream Act (known as Best Live Act from 2013 to 2020) is an award presented by the American Association of Independent Music at the annual Libera Award which recognizes "best live concert performances by an independent label" since 2013.

== Winners and nominees ==
Year	Winner(s)	Nominees	Ref.
2013	Alabama Shakes	Awolnation; Bloc Party; Delta Spirit; Hatebreed; M83; Matt and Kim; Ra Ra Riot	
2014	Arcade Fire	Charles Bradley; Chvrches; Hanni El Khatib; J. Roddy Walston and the Business; Pearl Jam; Queens of the Stone Age	
The award was not given in 2015.
2016	Alabama Shakes	Against Me!; Father John Misty; Future Islands; Nathaniel Rateliff & the Night Sweats; Run the Jewels; St. Vincent	
2017	Radiohead	Angel Olsen; Bon Iver; Charles Bradley; Chuck Prophet; Iggy Pop; Run the Jewels	
2018	Nick Cave	Father John Misty; Flying Lotus; King Gizzard & the Lizard Wizard; Queens of the Stone Age	
2019	BadBadNotGood	King Gizzard & the Lizard Wizard; Mitski; Run the Jewels; Kelela	
2020	Idles	Flying Lotus; Courtney Barnett; Mavis Staples; Fontaines D.C.	
2021	Phoebe Bridgers	Run the Jewels; Fontaines D.C.; Perfume Genius; Arca	
2022	Mdou Moctar – Live at the Niger River	Amyl and the Sniffers – Live on KEXP at Home; Black Pumas – "Colors" at Celebrating America; Japanese Breakfast – "Be Sweet" at The Tonight Show Starring Jimmy Fallon; Jason Isbell and the 400 Unit – "Driver 8" Live from Athens, Georgia; St. Vincent – "At the Holiday Party" at the Austin City Limits Music Festival	
2023	Low Live	Bartees Strange – Live at the Getty; Black Pumas – Colors Live at Abbey Road Studios; Idles – Live on From the Basement; King Gizzard & the Lizard Wizard at Red Rocks; Phoebe Bridgers – Glastonbury 2022; Wet Leg – US 2022 Tour	

== Artists with multiple wins ==
2 wins

- Alabama Shakes

== Artists with multiple nominations ==
4 nominations

- Run the Jewels

2 nominations

- Alabama Shakes
- Charles Bradley
- Father John Misty
- Flying Lotus
- Fontaines D.C.
- King Gizzard & the Lizard Wizard
- Queens of the Stone Age
- St. Vincent
