= 2023 Libera Awards =

2023 edition of award ceremony

- Date: June 15, 2023
- Location: Town Hall, New York City, United States
- Hosted by: Hannibal Buress
- Most awards: Wet Leg (5)
- Most nominations: Wet Leg (6)
- Website: liberaawards.com

Television/radio coverage
- Network: YouTube

The 2023 Libera Awards were held on June 15, 2023, to recognize the best in independent music of 2022 presented by the American Association of Independent Music. The ceremony took place at the Town Hall in New York City and was broadcast on YouTube. American comedian Hannibal Buress hosted the ceremony.

The nominations were announced on March 22, 2023, with British duo Wet Leg leading the nominations with six, followed by Sudan Archives, Allison Russell, Fontaines D.C. and Soul Glo, all with three each. Four new categories were introduced: Best Remix, Best Short-Form Video, Best Singer-Songwriter Record and Best Soul/Funk Record. Additionally, three categories were renamed: Best World Record was renamed into Best Global Record, Best Americana Record into Best American Roots Album, and Best Folk/Bluegrass Album into Best Folk Album.

Wet Leg received the most awards with five wins, including Record of the Year for their self-titled album. Sudan Archives also received multiple awards with two wins, Best R&B Record and Best Breakthrough Artist/Release.

== Performers ==
Artist(s)	Song(s)
Seratones	"Two of a Kind"
Dawn Richard and Spencer Zahn	"Crimson"
Eshu Tune	"1-3 Pocket" "Veneers"
Margo Price	"Lydia"
Marshall Allen and The Sun Ra Arkestra	"If You Came from Nowhere Here"
Tamtam	"ISMAK"
Gaby Moreno	"Til Waking Light"
Shemekia Copeland	"Too Far to Be Gone"
Sudan Archives	"Selfish Soul"
Martha Reeves	"Heat Wave"

== Winners and nominees ==
The nominees were announced on March 22, 2023. Winners are listed first and in bold.

Record of the Year	Self-Released Record of the Year
**Wet Leg – Wet Leg**; Blue Rev – Alvvays; Stumpwork – Dry Cleaning; I Walked with You a Ways – Plains; Diaspora Problems – Soul Glo; A Light for Attracting Attention – The Smile	**Two Sisters – Sarah Davachi**; "Cool Kids (Our Version)" – Echosmith; Jersey Girl – Jessie Baylin; Rita Wilson Now & Forever: Duets – Rita Wilson; When the Lights Go – Totally Enormous Extinct Dinosaurs
A2IM Humanitarian Award	Best Alternative Rock Record
**Killer Mike**; Allison Russell; Björk; Hopeless Records; Margo Price; Tegan and Sara	**Wet Leg – Wet Leg**; Blue Rev – Alvvays; Stumpwork – Dry Cleaning; Laurel Hell – Mitski; Painless – Nilüfer Yanya
Best American Roots Record	Best Blues Record
**Big Time – Angel Olsen**; Fortune Favors the Bold – 49 Winchester; El Mirador – Calexico; The Man from Waco – Charley Crockett; This Is a Photograph – Kevin Morby; Denim & Diamonds – Nikki Lane	**Done Come Too Far – Shemekia Copeland**; Bloodline Maintenance – Ben Harper; Outdated Emotion – Delbert McClinton; Set Sail – North Mississippi Allstars; I Need a Job...So I Can Buy More Auto-Tune – Swamp Dogg
Best Classical Record	Best Country Record
**Pigments – Dawn Richard and Spencer Zahn**; We Will Live On – Deru; memorie – doeke; Invisible Forces – James Heather; At the Crest – Jonas Colstrup; Lost & Found – Sean Shibe	**I Walked with You a Ways – Plains**; "Cypress Hills and the Big Country" – Colter Wall; Run, Rose, Run – Dolly Parton; Neon Blue – Joshua Hedley; Blackberry Rose – Lavender Country; "Change of Heart" – Margo Price; Jerry Jeff – Steve Earle and The Dukes
Best Dance Record	Best Electronic Record
**"Water" – Bicep**; "Good Times/Problemz" – Jungle; "Happy Ending" – Kelela; "Can't Stop Thinking About" – Logic1000; "Strong" – Romy featuring Fred Again; "DJ Kicks" – Theo Parrish	**The Last Goodbye – Odesza**; Fragments – Bonobo; Topical Dancer – Charlotte Adigéry and Bolis Pupul; I Love You Jennifer B – Jockstrap; Let's Turn It into Sound – Kaitlyn Aurelia Smith; Nymph – Shygirl; No Rules Sandy – Sylvan Esso
Best Folk Record	Best Heavy Record
**Dragon New Warm Mountain I Believe in You – Big Thief**; Age of Apathy – Aoife O'Donovan; Quitters – Christian Lee Hutson; Pre Pleasure – Julia Jacklin; Quiet the Room – Skullcrusher	**Hellfire – black midi**; The Death of Peace of Mind – Bad Omens; "Riptide" – Beartooth; Gnosis – Russian Circles; Trouble the Water – Show Me the Body; Diaspora Problems – Soul Glo
Best Hip-Hop/Rap Record	Best Jazz Record
**Louie – Kenny Beats**; **RTJ Cu4tro – Run the Jewels**; Cheat Codes – Danger Mouse and Black Thought; Melt My Eyez See Your Future – Denzel Curry; Few Good Things – Saba; As Above, So Below – Sampa the Great	**"The Garden Path" – Kamasi Washington**; Where I'm Meant to Be – Ezra Collective; Anyhow – Leland Whitty; Living Sky – The Sun Ra Arkestra; New Standards Vol. 1 – Terri Lyne Carrington, Kris Davis, Linda May Han Oh, Nicholas Payton, and Matthew Stevens
Best Latin Record	Best Outlier Record
**"Ya No Estoy Aquí" – Helado Negro**; Boleros Psicodélicos – Adrian Quesada; IRE – Combo Chimbita; Quietude – Eliane Elias; If You Will – Flora Purim; Estrela Acesa – Sessa; Marchita – Silvana Estrada	**Please Have a Seat – NNAMDÏ**; Time Skiffs – Animal Collective; Matisyahu – Matisyahu; Jazz Codes – Moor Mother; COMETA – Nick Hakim; Glitch Princess – yeule
Best Pop Record	Best Punk Record
**Muna – MUNA**; Fossora – Björk; Two Ribbons – Let's Eat Grandma; Second Nature – Lucius; Stay Proud of Me – NoSo; Hold the Girl – Rina Sawayama; Crybaby – Tegan and Sara	**Growing Up – The Linda Lindas**; Back Home – Big Joanie; Endure – Special Interest; The Hum Goes on Forever – The Wonder Years; Loggerhead – Wu-Lu
Best R&B Record	Best Re-Issue
**Natural Brown Prom Queen – Sudan Archives**; Let Me Down Easy: Bettye LaVette in Memphis Sun Records 70th / Remastered 2022 – Bettye LaVette; "Texas Sun" – Khruangbin and Leon Bridges; S/T – Thee Sacred Souls; Remember Your North Star – Yaya Bey	**Fela with Ginger Baker Live! – Fela Kuti**; Bon Iver, 10th Anniversary Edition – Bon Iver; In My Own Time, 50th Anniversary Edition – Karen Dalton; Words & Music, May 1865 (Deluxe Edition) – Lou Reed; Nancy & Lee – Nancy Sinatra; Wild Creatures – Neko Case; A Message from the People – Ray Charles
Best Rock Record	Best Singer-Songwriter Record
**Skinty Fia – Fontaines D.C.**; When the Wind Forgets Your Name – Built to Spill; Fear of the Dawn – Jack White; Sometimes, Forever – Soccer Mommy; Lucifer on the Sofa – Spoon	**And in the Darkness, Hearts Aglow – Weyes Blood**; Warm Chris – Aldous Harding; "You're Not Alone" – Allison Russell featuring Brandi Carlile; Weather Alive – Beth Orton; Boat Songs – MJ Lenderman
Best Soul/Funk Record	Best Spiritual Record
**Sentimental Fool – Lee Fields**; Live in Stockholm 1972 – Ray Charles; Love & Algorhythms – Seratones; The Alien Coast – St. Paul and The Broken Bones; I Need a Job...So I Can Buy More Auto-Tune – Swamp Dogg	**JAMIE – Montell Fish**; And Now Let's Turn to Page... – Brent Cobb; Worship Anywhere: Live from Camp NewBreed – Israel & New Breed; Church Clothes 4 – Lecrae; Look Up! – The Harlem Gospel Travelers
Best Sync Usage	Best Global Record
**"A Flower Called Nowhere" by Stereolab in Atlanta**; "Go Home" by Angel Olsen in Empire of Light film trailer; "Water No Get Enemy" by Fela Kuti in Airbnb ad; "Don't Lose Sight" by Lawrence in Microsoft ad; "Drink Before the War" by Sinéad O'Connor in Euphoria	**"Weird Fishes / Arpeggi" – Rodrigo y Gabriela**; En Är För Mycket och Tusen Aldrig Nog – Dungen; Electricity – Ibibio Sound Machine; Let the Festivities Begin! – Los Bitchos; Afrique Refait – Mdou Moctar; Kel Tinariwen – Tinariwen; Ali – Vieux Farka Touré and Khruangbin
Breakthrough Artist/Release	Creative Packaging
**Sudan Archives**; Allison Russell; Charlotte Sands; Soul Glo; The Linda Lindas	**Ants from Up There – Black Country, New Road**; 2020 Collectors' Set – Jack White; Words & Music, May 1965 (Deluxe Edition) – Lou Reed; Laurel Hell – Mitski; Circuital (Deluxe Edition) – My Morning Jacket; Dopesmoker, Weedian High-Fi Edition – Sleep
Independent Champion	Label of the Year (Big)
**Bandcamp**; Aaron Axelsen; FUGA; Redeye; Secretly Distribution; TuneCore	**Partisan Records**; ATO Records; Hopeless Records; Merge Records; New West Records; Ninja Tune; Sub Pop Records; Third Man Records; Warp Records
Label of the Year (Medium)	Label of the Year (Small)
**Captured Tracks**; City Slang; Daptone Records; Glassnote Records; Saddle Creek; Yep Roc Records	**Innovative Leisure**; Don Giovanni Records; Fire Talk; Oh Boy Records; Topshelf Records
Best Live/Livestream Act	Best Remix
**Low Live**; Bartees Strange – Live at the Getty; Black Pumas – Colors Live at Abbey Road Studios; Idles – Live on From the Basement; King Gizzard & the Lizard Wizard at Red Rocks; Phoebe Bridgers – Glastonbury 2022; Wet Leg – US 2022 Tour	**"Too Late Now" (Soulwax Remix) – Wet Leg**; "Do It to It" (Tiësto Mix) – ACRAZE + Tiësto; "Wretched" (keiyaA Remix) – Bartees Strange; "Cliché" (Soulwax Remix) – Charlotte Adigéry & Bolis Pupul; "Nothing Is Safe" (Remx) – Clipping; "Get Sun" (Georgia Anne Muldrow Remix) – Hiatus Kaiyote; "Midnight Sun" (Sampha remix) – Nilüfer Yanya
Video of the Year	Best Short-Form Video
**"Ur Mom" – Wet Leg**; "Hawk for the Dove" – Amanda Shires; "Jackie Down the Line" – Fontaines D.C.; "Thank You" – Jaywood; "Parasites" – NoSo; "Spitting Off the Edge of the World" – Yeah Yeah Yeahs	**Mahal TikTok series – Toro y Moi**; "Scooter" – Belle and Sebastian; Hellfire TikTok Promotion – Black Midi; The Runner – Boy Harsher; "Pistol" – Cigarettes After Sex; Louie 001 Instagram vignette series – Kenny Beats
Marketing Genius	Special awards
**Wet Leg – Wet Leg (Domino Recording Co.)**; Skinty Fia – Fontaines D.C. (Partisan Records); IMPERA – Ghost (Loma Vista Recordings); Natural Brown Prom Queen – Sudan Archives (Stones Throw Records); Cool It Down – Yeah Yeah Yeahs (Secretly Canadian)	Independent Icon Award: **Marshall Allen and The Sun Ra Arkestra**; Independent Icon Award: **Martha Reeves**
