= 2019 Libera Awards =

Awards ceremony

- Date: June 20, 2019
- Location: Ziegfeld Ballroom
- Country: United States
- Presented by: A2IM
- Hosted by: Chris Gethard
- Most wins: Kamasi Washington (3)
- Most nominations: Mitski (5)
- Website: liberaawards.com

The 2019 Libera Awards took place on June 20, 2019. Presented by the American Association of Independent Music, it recognized the best in independent music during a ceremony at New York City's Ziegfeld Ballroom.

The ceremony was hosted by comedian Chris Gethard and featured performances by Deva Mahal, Sunflower Bean, and Jean-Michel Blais.

This was the first year where there were three categories for Label of the Year as opposed to two; Small (5 or fewer employees), Medium (6-14 employees), and Big (15 or more employees).

== Winners and nominees ==
Adapted from Libera Awards.

Album of the Year	Best Live Act
Kamasi Washington – Heaven and Earth: Mitski – Be The Cowboy; IDLES – Joy as an Act of Resistance; serpentwithfeet – soil; Yves Tumor – Safe In The Hands Of Love	BADBADNOTGOOD: King Gizzard & the Lizard Wizard; Mitski; Run the Jewels; Kelela
Best American Roots/Folk Album	Best Blues Album
John Prine – The Tree of Forgiveness: Calexico – The Thread That Keeps Us; Richard Thompson – 13 Rivers; I'm With Her – See You Around; Dom Flemons – Black Cowboys	Fantastic Negrito – Please Don't Be Dead: Shemekia Copeland – America's Child; Boz Scaggs – Out Of The Blues; Deva Mahal – Run Deep; Cedric Burnside – Benton County Relic
Best Classical Album	Best Country/Americana Album
Jean-Michel Blais – Dans ma main: Niklas Paschburg – Oceanic; Henrik Schwarz & Metropole Orkest – Scripted Orkestra; London Symphony Orchestra – Fuchs: Piano Concerto "Spiritualist"; Oliver Coates – John Luther Adams: Canticles of the Sky	John Prine – The Tree of Forgiveness: Phosphorescent – C'est La Vie; Mary Gauthier – Rifles and Rosary Beads; Jim Lauderdale – Time Flies; Alejandro Escovedo – The Crossing
Best Dance/Electronic Album	Best Hip-Hop/Rap Album
Yves Tumor – Safe In The Hands Of Love: Leon Vynehall – Nothing Is Still; Jon Hopkins – Singularity; SOPHIE – Oil of Every Pearl's Un-Insides; Oneohtrix Point Never – Age Of	Awkwafina – In Fina We Trust: August Greene – August Greene; Myke Bogan – Joe Fontana; Blueface – Famous Cryp; Junglepussy – JP3
Best Jazz Album	Best Latin Album
Kamasi Washington – Heaven and Earth: Onyx Collective – Lower East Suite Part Three; Esperanza Spalding – 12 Little Spells; Julian Lage – Modern Lore; Tia Fuller – Diamond Cut	Bad Bunny – X 100PRE: Cuco – Chiquito; Orquesta Akokán – Orquesta Akokán; El Alfa – El Hombre; Mariachi Reyna de Los Angeles – Mariachi Reyna de Los Angeles
Best Metal Album	Best Outlier Album
Deafheaven – Ordinary Corrupt Human Love: High on Fire – Electric Messiah; Underoath – Erase Me; Thou – Magus; Sleep – The Sciences	Khruangbin – Con Todo El Mundo: Kero Kero Bonito – Time 'n' Place; Serpentwithfeet – soil; Yves Tumor – Safe In The Hands Of Love; Oneohtrix Point Never – Age Of
Best R&B Album	Best Re-Issue Album
Charles Bradley – Black Velvet: Durand Jones & The Indications – Durand Jones & The Indications; Blood Orange – Negro Swan; Kadhja Bonet – Childqueen; Serpentwithfeet – soil	Pixies – Come On Pilgrim...It's Surfer Rosa: Tom Waits – Small Change; Bauhaus – The Bela Session; Liz Phair – Girly-Sound To Guyville: The 25th Anniversary Boxset; Hiss Golden Messenger – Devotion: Songs About Rivers and Spirits and Children
Best Rock Album	Best Sync Usage
Courtney Barnett – Tell Me How You Really Feel: Mitski – Be The Cowboy; Shame – Songs of Praise; Snail Mail – Lush; IDLES – Joy as an Act of Resistance	Run the Jewels (RTJ Music, Inc.) – x Black Panther: Gillian Welch (Acony Records) – "The Way It Will Be" in This Is Us; Shigeto (Ghostly International) – "Ann Arbor Pt 1" & "Lady Misaki" in Japan's Decorated Trucks - Shot on iPhone (Apple); Perfume Genius (Matador Records) – Eighth Grade trailer; Alice Merton (Mom+Pop) – "No Roots" (Mini Cooper Sync)
Best World Album	Breakthrough Artist/Release
Bombino – Deran: Gilberto Gil – OK OK OK; Femi Kuti – One People One World; Angelique Kidjo – Remain in Light; Seun Kuti & Egypt 80 – Black Times	IDLES – Joy as an Act of Resistance: Snail Mail – Lush; Lucy Dacus – Historian; Sunflower Bean – Come For Me; Caroline Rose – Loner
Creative Packaging	Independent Champion
Kamasi Washington – Heaven and Earth: Various Artists – Brainfeeder X; Charles Bradley – Black Velvet Deluxe Box; Mitski – Be The Cowboy; John Maus – Vinyl Box Set	NPR: Caroline; CD Baby; Redeye; SoundExchange
Label of the Year (Big)	Label of the Year (Medium)
Domino Recording Co.: Dead Oceans; Polyvinyl Record Co.; Rough Trade Records; Warp Records	Partisan Records: Bloodshot Records; Mom+Pop; Saddle Creek; Yep Roc Records
Label of the Year (Small)	Marketing Genius
Daptone Records: Brainfeeder; Hardly Art; Innovative Leisure; Oh Boy Records	Aphex Twin – Collapse EP: King Gizzard – King Gizzard Reissues Campaign; Khruangbin – Con Todo El Mundo; IDLES – Joy as an Act of Resistance; Reggae Month – Studio One
Video of the Year	
Mitski – "Nobody": Moses Sumney – "Quarrel"; John Prine – "Summer's End"; Aphex Twin – "T69 Collapse"; Kamasi Washington – "Street Fighter"	

== Special awards ==
A2IM Lifetime Achievement Award

- Jonathan Poneman, co-founder of Sub Pop
