= 2022 Libera Awards =

2022 edition of award ceremony

- Date: June 16, 2022
- Location: Webster Hall
- Most awards: Japanese Breakfast (4)
- Most nominations: Japanese Breakfast (7)
- Website: liberaawards.com

The 2022 Libera Awards was held on June 16, 2022, to recognize the best in independent music presented by the American Association of Independent Music. The ceremony streamed live on YouTube.

The nominations were announced on March 23, 2022, led by indie pop band Japanese Breakfast with seven. New award categories, Self-Released Record of the Year and Best Pop Record, were added. The Best Dance/Electronic Record category was divided into two categories: Best Dance Record and Best Electronic Record, bringing the total number of categories to 36. The Best Metal Record was renamed Best Heavy Record.

The awards ceremony took place on June 16, 2022, held in New York City at Webster Hall. With four awards, Japanese Breakfast was the most awarded artist.

== Winners and nominees ==
Record of the Year	Self-Released Record of the Year
Jubilee – Japanese Breakfast: Collapsed in Sunbeams – Arlo Parks; Georgia Blue – Jason Isbell and the 400 Unit; Hey What – Low; New Long Leg – Dry Cleaning; Valentine – Snail Mail	Deadpan Love – Cautious Clay: Half God – Wiki; A New Child – Jackson Wooten; Ready Is Always Too Late – Sinéad Harnett; Rebecca Black Was Here – Rebecca Black; Yellow – Emma-Jean Thackray
A2IM Humanitarian Award	Best Alternative Rock Record
Common for work with A Rebirth of Sound: Margo Price for work with Farm Aid; Recording Artists and Music Professionals with Disabilities (RAMPD); Rev. Moose for work with National Independent Venue Association (NIVA); Secretly Group – SC25 - Every Light On This Side of The Town; Hopeless Records / Sub City Records – Songs That Saved My Life	Jubilee – Japanese Breakfast: HEY WHAT – Low; If I Could Make It Go Quiet – Girl in Red; New Long Leg – Dry Cleaning; Things Take Time, Take Time – Courtney Barnett; Valentine – Snail Mail; "Wildfire" – Cautious Clay
Best Americana Record	Best Blues Record
History of a Feeling – Madi Diaz: Another Side – Leo Nocentelli; Georgia Blue – Jason Isbell and the 400 Unit; Leftover Feelings – John Hiatt with The Jerry Douglas Band; Other You – Steve Gunn; The Pet Parade – Fruit Bats; Quietly Blowing It – Hiss Golden Messenger	662 – Christone "Kingfish" Ingram I Be Trying – Cedric Burnside: "Can't Stop the Rain" – Neal Francis; Dear America – Eric Bibb; Promenade Blue – Nick Waterhouse; Rose-Colored Glasses, Vol. 1 – Teresa James & the Rhythm Tramps
Best Classical Record	Best Country Record
Impermanence/Disintegration – Bryce Dessner, Australian String Quartet and Sydney Dance Company: All the Unknown – Grandbrothers; Canadiana – Canadian Brass; Our Flashback Wedding – Vitamin String Quartet; Piano Piano – Jeremiah Fraites; Sunbathing Through a Glass Screen – Theo Alexander	The Ballad of Dood and Juanita – Sturgill Simpson: American Siren – Emily Scott Robinson; Own Side Now (Deluxe Anniversary Edition) – Caitlin Rose; Reckless – Morgan Wade; Sayin' What I'm Thinkin' – Lainey Wilson; Southern Curiosity – Fancy Hagood
Best Dance Record	Best Electronic Record
Loving in Stereo – Jungle: DJ-Kicks: Disclosure – Disclosure; "Loose Your Mind" – Dawn Richard; "Original Classic" – Keys N Krates; "Stay High again.." (Fred again.. & Joy Anonymous Remix) – Brittany Howard; You've Got the Whole Night to Go – Logic1000	Before I Die – Park Hye Jin: Kick III – Arca; Second Line – Dawn Richard; Yasuke – Flying Lotus; "You Can Do It" – Caribou
Best Folk/Bluegrass Record	Best Heavy Record
Fun House – Hand Habits Local Valley – José González: Broken Hearts & Dirty Windows: Songs of John Prine, Vol. 2 – Various artists; Geist – Shannon Lay; Ignorance – The Weather Station; The Way Back Home – Aisha Badru	Infinite Granite – Deafheaven: 10 Babymetal Budokan – Babymetal; Distant Populations – Quicksand; Eternal Blue – Spiritbox; Radical – Every Time I Die
Best Hip-Hop/Rap Record	Best Jazz Record
Sometimes I Might Be Introvert – Little Simz: Broken Hearts and Beauty Sleep – Mykki Blanco; By the Time I Get to Phoenix – Injury Reserve; Elephant in the Room – Mick Jenkins; Off the Yak – Young M.A; "Your Heart" – Joyner Lucas & J. Cole	Talk Memory – BadBadNotGood: The American Negro – Adrian Younge; Daring Mind – Jihye Lee Orchestra; "Qadir" (BadBadNotGood Remix) – Nick Hakim; Septet – John Carroll Kirby; Space 1.8 – Nala Sinephro
Best Latin Record	Best Outlier Record
Far In – Helado Negro: El Alimento – Cimafunk; Kick II – Arca; La Cruzada – Alejandro Escovedo; Looking Back – Los Retros; Una Rosa – Xenia Rubinos	Fatigue – L'Rain: Black Encyclopedia of the Air – Moor Mother; Inside (The Songs) – Bo Burnham; Colourgrade – Tirzah; Entertainment, Death – Spirit of the Beehive
Best Pop Record	Best Punk Record
Collapsed in Sunbeams – Arlo Parks: Ashlyn – Ashe; How Long Do You Think It's Gonna Last? – Big Red Machine; KIDS – Noga Erez; WINK – CHAI	"Racist, Sexist Boy" (Live at Los Angeles Public Library) – The Linda Lindas: Comfort to Me – Amyl and the Sniffers; Let Me Do One More – Illuminati Hotties; The Mutt's Nuts – Chubby and the Gang; Spare Ribs – Sleaford Mods
Best R&B Record	Best Re-Issue
Mood Valiant – Hiatus Kaiyote: Alpha – Charlotte Day Wilson; Deacon – Serpentwithfeet; Jaime (Reimagined) – Brittany Howard; Last Year Was Weird, Vol. 3 – Tkay Maidza; Private Space – Durand Jones & The Indications	Kid A Mnesia – Radiohead: 77-81 – Gang of Four; Buena Vista Social Club (25th Anniversary Edition) – Buena Vista Social Club; The Golden Age of Apocalypse (Ten Year Anniversary Edition) – Thundercat; The Good, the Bad, and the Funky – Tom Tom Club; Ladies and Gentlemen We Are Floating in Space – Spiritualized
Best Rock Record	Best Spiritual Record
Crawler – Idles: Capitol Cuts (Live at Studio A) – Black Pumas; The Comeback Special – The The; Drunk Tank Pink – Shame; Sympathy for Life – Parquet Courts	"I Wish I Knew How It Would Feel To Be Free" – The Blind Boys of Alabama featuring Béla Fleck: "Don't Worry Bout It" – Wande featuring Porsha Love; Front Porch Singin' – The Oak Ridge Boys; Mercy – Natalie Bergman; O Come, All Ye Faithful – Hiss Golden Messenger
Best Sync Usage	Best World Record
"I Know the End" – Phoebe Bridgers for Mare of Easttown (Episode 6): "Caravan of Fools" – John Prine for Yellowstone (Season 4, Episode 3); "Chaise Longue" – Wet Leg for Gossip Girl (Season 1, Episode 5); "Colors" – Black Pumas for the Concrete Cowboy trailer; "Hello" – Adele for NFL/Tom Brady's Return; "She's a Rainbow" – The Rolling Stones for Ted Lasso (Season 2, Episode 5); "Zombie" – Fela Kuti for the Gucci 100 promo campaign	Afrique Victime – Mdou Moctar: João Donato JID007 – João Donato; Legacy+ – Femi Kuti and Made Kuti; The Return of Pachyman – Pachyman; Yol – Altın Gün
Breakthrough Artist/Release	Creative Packaging
Wet Leg – "Chaise Longue": Black Country, New Road – For the First Time; Girl in Red – If I Could Make It Go Quiet; Japanese Breakfast – Jubilee; Mdou Moctar – Afrique Victime	Japanese Breakfast – Jubilee: Buzzcocks – Complete UA Singles 1977-1980; Erroll Garner – Liberation in Swing: Centennial Collection; Fela Kuti – Box Set #5 Co-Curated by Chris Martin & Femi Kuti; Gang of Four – 77-81; Gary Numan – 45x15 The Singles Collection 1978-1983
Independent Champion	Label of the Year (Big)
Bandcamp: FUGA; Light in the Attic Distribution; Redeye Worldwide; SoundExchange	Matador Records Mom + Pop Music: ATO Records; Merge Records; Ninja Tune; Polyvinyl Record Co.; Third Man Records
Label of the Year (Medium)	Label of the Year (Small)
Sacred Bones Records: City Slang; Hopeless Records; New West Records; Saddle Creek Records; Yep Roc Records	Oh Boy Records: Don Giovanni Records; Innovative Leisure; Sargent House; Sundazed Music
Marketing Genius	Video of the Year
Japanese Breakfast (Dead Oceans) – Jubilee: Bicep (Ninja Tune) – Isles; Death Row Records – Death Row Records 30th Anniversary; Eyedress (Lex Records) – Mulholland Drive; Helado Negro (4AD) – Helado Negro Ice Cream Tricycle; King Gizzard & the Lizard Wizard (ATO Records) – Official Bootlegger Series	Wet Leg – "Chaise Longue": Danny Elfman – "True"; Idles – "Car Crash"; Japanese Breakfast – "Savage Good Boy"; Sharon Van Etten & Angel Olsen – "Like I Used To"; Yves Tumor – "Jackie"
Best Live/Livestream Act	Special awards
Mdou Moctar – Live at the Niger River: Amyl and the Sniffers – Live on KEXP at Home; Black Pumas – "Colors" at Celebrating America; Japanese Breakfast – "Be Sweet" at The Tonight Show Starring Jimmy Fallon; Jason Isbell and the 400 Unit – "Driver 8" Live from Athens, Georgia; St. Vincent – "At the Holiday Party" at the Austin City Limits Music Festival	Excellence in advocacy – Dionne Warwick Congressional independent music guardian – Congresswoman Linda Sánchez (D-CA) Innovation in sustainability – IMPALA Sustainability Task Force

=== Multiple nominations ===
Nominees with more than two nominations.

Artists

Nominations	Artist
7	Japanese Breakfast
3	Black Pumas
3	Cautious Clay
3	Jason Isbell and the 400 Unit
3	Mdou Moctar
3	Wet Leg
2	Amyl and the Sniffers
2	Arca
2	Arlo Parks
2	BadBadNotGood
2	Brittany Howard
2	Dawn Richard
2	Dry Cleaning
2	Fela Kuti
2	Gang of Four
2	Girl in Red
2	Helado Negro
2	Hiss Golden Messenger
2	Idles
2	Low
2	Snail Mail

Record labels

Nominations	Record label
12	ATO Records
9	Dead Oceans
8	Matador Records
7	Merge Records
6	Ninja Tune
6	Thirty Tigers
5	4AD
5	Domino Recording Co.
5	XL Recordings
4	AWAL
4	Epitaph Records
4	Oh Boy Records
4	Partisan Records
4	Sub Pop
3	Anti-
3	BMG
3	Cautious Clay
3	City Slang
3	Hopeless Records
3	Mom + Pop Music
3	[PIAS]
3	Saddle Creek Records
3	Transgressive Records
3	Warp
2	Brainfeeder
2	Fat Possum Records
2	INgrooves
2	Innovative Leisure
2	Jagjaguwar
2	Jazz Is Dead
2	Knitting Factory Records
2	Light in the Attic Records
2	New West Records
2	Rough Trade Records
2	Sargent House
2	Single Lock Records
2	Southeastern Records
2	Stones Throw Records
2	Third Man Records
2	Yep Roc Records
