= Libera Awards =

Annual music awards by the American Association of Independent Music

- Current: 2026 Libera Awards
- Awarded for: The achievements of the Independent music sector
- Country: United States
- Presented by: A2IM
- First award: 2012
- Website: liberaawards.com

The Libera Awards are an annual awards ceremony organized by the American Association of Independent Music (A2IM). First hosted in 2012, the awards celebrate the independent music community. The capstone of A2IM's Indie Week, an annual music business conference, the ceremony has been able to be viewed by the public since 2020.

The top-billed awards are generally Record of the Year and Best Live Act, in addition to Label of the Year, Best Sync Usage, and Video of the Year, among others. In addition to the awards which are voted on, A2IM annually confers the Lifetime Achievement and Independent Icon Awards to industry leaders and artists, respectively.

== List of ceremonies ==
Overview of Libera Awards ceremonies
Year	Date	Venue	Broadcast	Host
2012	June 21	Le Poisson Rouge	—N/a	John Ross Bowie
2013	June 20	Highline Ballroom	—N/a	John Ross Bowie
2014	June 20	Highline Ballroom	—N/a	John Ross Bowie
2015	June 25	Highline Ballroom	—N/a	John Ross Bowie
2016	June 16	Manhattan Center	—N/a	Ted Leo
2017	June 8	PlayStation Theater	—N/a	Ted Leo
2018	June 21	PlayStation Theater	—N/a	Kate Wolff
2019	June 20	Ziegfeld Theatre	—N/a	Chris Gethard
2020	June 18	—N/a	YouTube	Chris Gethard
2021	June 17		YouTube	
2022	June 16	Webster Hall	YouTube	
2023	June 15	Town Hall	YouTube	Hannibal Buress
2024	June 10	Gotham Hall	YouTube	
2025	June 9	Gotham Hall	YouTube	Delisa Shannon
2026	June 8	Gotham Hall		

== Award categories ==
Note: the names of most categories have been tweaked overtime with the most significant name changes indicated below. Updated 2022.

=== Artist-specific awards ===
- Best Live Act (2013–2014, 2016–)
- A2IM Humanitarian Award (2021–)
- Best Breakthrough Artist (2012–) (2012–2014: Up & Comer Award)

Former categories

- Road Warrior of the Year (2012–2016) (2013–2015: Hardest Working Artist; 2016: Into the Pit Award)

=== Record-specific awards ===
- Record of the Year (2012–)
- Self-Released Record of the Year (2022–)
- A2IM Artist Record of the Year Award (2021–) (honors self-released artists)
- Best Alternative Rock Record (2020–)
- Best American Roots Record (2018–)
- Best Blues Record (2018–)
- Best Classical Record (2018–)
- Best Country Record (2018–)
- Best Dance Record (2022–)
- Best Electronic Record (2022–)
- Best Folk Record (2020–) (2020–2022: Best Folk/Bluegrass Record)
- Best Heavy Record (2018, 2020–2021: Best Metal Record)
- Best Hip-Hop/Rap Record (2017–)
- Best Jazz Record (2018–)
- Best Latin Record (2018–)
- Best Outlier Record (2018–)
- Best Pop Record (2022–)
- Best Punk Record (2020–) (2020: Best Punk/Emo Album)
- Best R&B Record (2018–)
- Best Re-Issue (2018–)
- Best Rock Record (2018–) (2020: Best Mainstream Rock Album)
- Best Singer-Songwriter Record (2023–)
- Best Soul/Funk Record (2023–)
- Best Spiritual Record (2021–)
- Best Global Record (2018–) (2018–2022: Best World Record)

Former categories

- Groundbreaking Album of the Year (2015–2016)
- Heritage Album of the Year (2015–2016)
- Shifting Beats Award (2016)
- Best Blues/Jazz/R&B Album (2017)
- Best Classical/World Album (2017)
- Best Country/Americana/Folk Album (2017)
- Best Dance/Electronic Record (2017–2021)
- Best Metal/Hard Rock Album (2017)
- Best Indie Rock Album (2017)

=== Industry awards ===
- Best Sync Usage (2012–)
- Video of the Year (2012–)
- Best Short-Form Video (2023–)
- Marketing Genius (2012–) (2012–2014: Light Bulb Award)
- Creative Packaging (2012–)
- Best Remix (2023–)
- Independent Champion (2012–) (2012–2013: 21st Century Award; 2014: Independent Ally of the Year; 2015: Marketplace Ally)
- Label of the Year (Small) (2012–)
- Label of the Year (Medium) (2019–) (2012–2018: combined into Indie Label (6 employees or more))
- Label of the Year (Big) (2019–) (2012–2018: combined into Indie Label (6 employees or more))

Former categories

- Music Supervisor (2012–2014)
- A&R Team of the Year (2016)
- Video of the Year (Fan Vote) (2017)

== Special awards ==
=== A2IM Lifetime Achievement Award ===
This award was first presented at the inaugural Libera Awards to honor contributions by industry leaders in independent music.

- 2012: Martin Mills, founder of Beggars Group
- 2013: Tom Silverman, founder of Tommy Boy Records
- 2014: Bruce Iglauer, founder of Alligator Records
- 2015: Patricia Chin and the Chin family, founder/founding family of VP Records
- 2016: Mike Curb, founder of Curb Records
- 2017: Ani DiFranco, artist and founder of Righteous Babe Records
- 2018: Brett Gurewitz, founder of Epitaph Records and co-founder of Anti-
- 2019: Jonathan Poneman, co-founder of Sub Pop
- 2020: Seymour Stein, co-founder of Sire Records
- 2021: TBD

=== Independent Icon Award ===
This award was first presented at the 2016 Libera Awards to honor a "groundbreaking Independent artists who have contributed to the Independent community and have paved the way for future Independents to succeed on their own terms." In 2015, it was presented as the Appleseed Award.

- 2015: Alison Wenham (Worldwide Independent Network)
- 2016: Naughty By Nature
- 2017: Nick Lowe
- 2018: Funky 4 + 1
- 2019: NPR (combined with Independent Champion Award)
- 2020: John Prine, Alejandro Escovedo & Suzanne Ciani
- 2021: Mavis Staples

=== Independent Impact Award ===
Formally titled the A2IM Independent Impact Award (as of 2021) this award honors the independent artist with the highest combined sales and streams as measured by Nielsen Music across all of the artist's commercial releases in the U.S. between a yearlong period.

- 2017: Florida Georgia Line – Dig Your Roots (Big Machine Label Group)
- 2018: Taylor Swift – Reputation (Big Machine Label Group)
- 2019: Was not awarded
- 2020: Was not awarded
- 2021: TBD
