= 2021 Libera Awards =

Annual US music awards ceremony

- Date: June 17, 2021
- Website: liberaawards.com

The 2021 Libera Awards took place on June 17, 2021, to recognize the best in independent music presented by the American Association of Independent Music. The nominations were announced on March 23, 2021. The years marks the tenth anniversary of the ceremony. The event was streamed live on YouTube.

A number of category changes took place for the awards. The A2IM Humanitarian Award and Best Spiritual Record were added to the ceremony and . A2IM also made the "Album" categories more inclusive by renaming them "Records." A2IM also renamed a number of categories: Best Live Act to Best Live/Livestream Act; Best Mainstream Rock Album and Best Indie Rock Album to Best Rock Record; and, Best Punk/Emo Album to Best Punk Record.

== Winners and nominees ==
| Record of the Year | Best Live/Livestream Act |
|---|---|
| Phoebe Bridgers – Punisher: Run the Jewels – RTJ4; Perfume Genius – Set My Heart On Fire Immediately; Yves Tumor – Heaven To A Tortured Mind; Thundercat – It Is What It Is; Waxahatchee – Saint Cloud | Phoebe Bridgers: Run the Jewels; Fontaines D.C.; Perfume Genius; Arca |
| A2IM Humanitarian Award | Best Alternative Rock Record |
| Killer Mike & EL-P of Run the Jewels: Rev. Moose; Megan Thee Stallion; Paul Redding; Kevin Liles | Phoebe Bridgers – Punisher: Soccer Mommy – Color Theory; Car Seat Headrest – Making A Door Less Open; Lido Pimienta – Miss Colombia; Rolling Blackouts Coastal Fever – Sideways to New Italy |
| Best Americana Record | Best Blues Record |
| Bonny Light Horseman – Bonny Light Horseman: Kevin Morby – Sundowner; Calexico – Seasonal Shift; Courtney Marie Andrews – Old Flowers; Lucinda Williams – Good Souls Better Angels | Fantastic Negrito – Have You Lost Your Mind Yet?: Bobby Rush – Rawer Than Raw; Don Bryant – You Make Me Feel; Robert Cray Band – That’s What I Heard; Sonny Landreth – Blacktop Run |
| Best Classical Record | Best Country Record |
| Erik Hall – Music for 18 Musicians (Steve Reich): Paul Moravec – Sanctuary Road; Echo Collective – The See Within; Niklas Paschburg – Svalbard; Vitamin String Quartet – Vitamin String Quartet Performs Lana Del Rey | Waxahatchee – Saint Cloud: Margo Price – That’s How Rumors Get Started; Colter Wall – Western Swing & Waltzes And Other Punchy Songs; Various Artists – Willie Nelson American Outlaw (Live At Bridgestone Arena/2019); Jaime Wyatt – Neon Cross |
| Best Dance/Electronic Record | Best Folk/Bluegrass Record |
| Caribou – Suddenly: Arca – KiCk i; Ela Minus – Acts of Rebellion; Yaeji – What We Drew; Actress – Karma & Desire | Angel Olsen – Whole New Mess: Ben Harper – Winter Is For Lovers; Gillian Welch – Boots No. 2: The Lost Songs; Jason Molina – Eight Gates; Laura Marling – Song For Our Daughter |
| Best Hip-Hop/Rap Record | Best Jazz Record |
| Run the Jewels – RTJ4: clipping. – Visions of Bodies Being Burned; Little Simz – Drop 6; The Koreatown Oddity – Little Dominiques Nosebleed; Naeem – Startisha | Gil Scott-Heron & Makaya McCraven – We're New Again – A Reimagining by Makaya McCraven: Jeff Parker – Suite for Max Brown; Ali Shaheed Muhammad and Adrian Younge – Azymuth JID004; Christian McBride – The Movement Revisited: A Musical Portrait of Four Icons; John Carroll Kirby – My Garden; Raul Midón – The Mirror; Jyoti – Mama, You Can Bet! |
| Best Latin Record | Best Metal Record |
| Gabriel Garzón-Montano – Agüita: Bad Bunny – El Último Tour Del Mundo; The Mavericks – En Español; Buscabulla – Regresa; Jungle Fire – Jungle Fire | Architects – “Animals” (from For Those That Wish to Exist): HUM – Inlet; Ghostemane – Anti-Icon; Ingested – Where Only Gods May Tread; Pyrrhon – Abscess Time |
| Best Outlier Record | Best Punk Record |
| Khruangbin – Mordechai: Oneohtrix Point Never – Magic Oneohtrix Point Never; Yves Tumor – Heaven To A Tortured Mind; Beverly Glenn-Copeland – Transmissions; Mary Lattimore – Silver Ladders; Moses Sumney – Græ | IDLES – Ultra Mono: Protomartyr – Ultimate Success Today; METZ – Atlas Vending; Viagra Boys – Common Sense; Porridge Radio – Every Bad |
| Best R&B Record | Best Re-Issue |
| Thundercat – It Is What It Is: Khruangbin & Leon Bridges – Texas Sun; Robert Glasper – “Better Than I Imagined (feat. H.E.R. & Meshell Ndegeocello)”; Son Little – aloha; Orion Sun – Hold Space For Me; Steve Arrington – Down To The Lowest Terms | J Dilla – Donuts (Jelly Edition): Pylon – Pylon Box; Hiroshi Yoshimura – Green; Pixies – Bossanova 30th Anniversary Reissue; Motorhead – Ace of Spades 40th Anniversary; Elliott Smith – Expanded 25th Anniversary Edition; Grandaddy – The Sophtware Slump 20th Anniversary Collection |
| Best Rock Record | Best Spiritual Record |
| Fontaines D.C. – A Hero's Death: King Krule – Man Alive!; Bartees Strange – "Mustang" (from Live Forever); Bob Mould – Blue Hearts; Caroline Rose – Superstar | Sun Ra Arkestra – Swirling: Lecrae – Restoration; Jon Hopkins – “Singing Bowl (Ascension)”; Thad Cockrell – If In Case You Feel The Same; Wande – EXIT |
| Best Sync Usage | Best World Record |
| Run the Jewels (Jewel Runners, Inc.) – “Ooh LA LA” – Season three of Netflix's Ozark: Black Pumas (ATO Records) “Colors” – Samsung Galaxy S20; Brittany Howard (ATO Records) “You’ll Never Walk Alone” – Johnnie Walker’s #KeepWalking Campaign; Blood Orange (Domino Recording Co.) “Tuesday Feeling (Choose to Stay)” – Season four of HBO's Insecure; IDLES (Partisan Records) “Grounds” – Watch Dogs: Legion | Altin Gün – “Ordunun Dereleri” Songhoy Blues – Optimisme: Antibalas – Fu Chronicles; Bebel Gilberto – Agora; Emel – The Tunis Diaries |
| Breakthrough Artist/Release | Creative Packaging |
| Arlo Parks: Bonny Light Horseman; Overcoats; Arlo McKinley; Orion Sun | Soccer Mommy – Color Theory limited edition back to school binder: Black Pumas – Black Pumas (Deluxe Edition); Perfume Genius – Set My Heart On Fire Immediately vinyl; Pylon – Pylon Box [CD Box Set]; IDLES – Ultra Mono |
| Independent Champion | Label of the Year (Large) |
| Bandcamp: SoundExchange; Secretly Distribution; TuneCore; The Orchard | Sub Pop: Partisan Records; Warp; Stones Throw Records; Ninja Tune |
| Label of the Year (Medium) | Label of the Year (Small) |
| Light In The Attic: Sacred Bones Records; Matador Records; Ghostly International; Rough Trade Records | Daptone Records: Innovative Leisure; Fire Talk Records; International Anthem; Hardly Art; Oh Boy Records |
| Marketing Genius | Video of the Year |
| Beggars Group – Supporting Indie Retail #loverecordstores Campaign: Jewel Runners, LLC – Run the Jewels x Cyberpunk2077 “No Save Point”; Phoebe Bridgers (Dead Oceans) – Punisher; Light In The Attic – Social Media & Digital Marketing; Perfume Genius (Matador Records) – Set My Heart On Fire Immediately Campaign | FKA twigs – “Sad Day": Perfume Genius – “Describe”; Phoebe Bridgers – “Savior Complex”; Run the Jewels – “Ooh La La”; Christine and the Queens – “La vita nuova”; ford. – “Fruit&Sun” |
| Icon Award | |
| Mavis Staples | |

=== Multiple wins and nominations ===
Nominees with more than two nominations

Artists

Multiple Wins
| Artist | Wins |
|---|---|
| Phoebe Bridgers | 5 |
| Run the Jewels | 5 |

Multiple Nominations
| Artist | Nominations |
|---|---|
| Run the Jewels | 7 |
| Phoebe Bridgers | 5 |
| Perfume Genius | 5 |
| IDLES | 3 |

Record Labels

Multiple Wins
| Artist | Wins |
|---|---|
| Dead Oceans | 4 |
| Jewel Runners | 3 |
| Jagjaguwar | 2 |
| Merge Records | 2 |
| Stones Throw Records | 2 |

Multiple Nominations
| Artist | Nominations |
|---|---|
| Dead Oceans | 8 |
| Partisan Records | 8 |
| Jewel Runners | 7 |
| Matador Records | 7 |
| Stones Throw Records | 6 |
| Anti- | 5 |
| Loma Vista | 5 |
| Thirty Tigers | 5 |
| Domino | 4 |
| Merge Records | 4 |
| New West Records | 4 |
| Sub Pop | 4 |
| Warp | 4 |
| XL Recordings | 4 |
| 37d03d | 3 |
| Fat Possum | 3 |
| Jagjaguwar | 3 |
| Light in the Attic | 3 |
| [PIAS] | 3 |

== Performances ==
- Arlo Parks – "Hope"
- Black Pumas
- Fantastic Negrito – "Chocolate Samurai"
- Lecrae – "Drown"
- Lido Pimienta – "Te quiera"
- Mavis Staples – "Who Told You That"
- Phoebe Bridgers
- Yuna – "Don't Blame It on Love"/"Crush"
- Stax Academy Rhythm Section
