= Libera Award for Record of the Year =

Music award

- Country: United States
- Presented by: American Association of Independent Music (A2IM)
- First award: 2012
- Currently held by: Jessica Pratt, Here in the Pitch (2025)
- Website: liberaawards.com

The Libera Award for Record of the Year (known as Album of the Year prior to 2021) is an award presented by the American Association of Independent Music at the annual Libera Award which recognizes "best album released commercially in the United States by an independent label" since 2012.

American band Bon Iver was the first recipients of the award for their eponymous album. Since 2013, a set of nominees is presented annually alongside the winner. Rock band Alabama Shakes are the only artists who have received the award more than once with two wins, for Boys & Girls in 2013 and for Sound & Color in 2016. Hip-hop duo Run the Jewels holds the most nominations in the category with three.

== Winners and nominees ==
Year	Winner(s)	Work	Nominees	Ref.
2012	Bon Iver	Bon Iver	—N/a	
2013	Alabama Shakes	Boys & Girls	Allah-Las – Allah-Las; Bloom – Beach House; Shields – Grizzly Bear; Celebration Rock – Japandroids; The Heist – Macklemore & Ryan Lewis; Babel – Mumford & Sons; Red – Taylor Swift; The Lumineers – The Lumineers; Coexist – The xx	
2014	Arcade Fire (tie)	Reflektor	Tomorrow's Harvest – Boards of Canada; WomanChild – Cécile McLorin Salvant; The Bones of What You Believe – Chvrches; The Worse Things Get... – Neko Case; Muchacho – Phosphorescent; Trouble Will Find Me – The National; Modern Vampires of the City – Vampire Weekend; Who is William Onyeabor? – William Onyeabor	
2014	Arctic Monkeys (tie)	AM	Tomorrow's Harvest – Boards of Canada; WomanChild – Cécile McLorin Salvant; The Bones of What You Believe – Chvrches; The Worse Things Get... – Neko Case; Muchacho – Phosphorescent; Trouble Will Find Me – The National; Modern Vampires of the City – Vampire Weekend; Who is William Onyeabor? – William Onyeabor	
2015	The War on Drugs	Lost in the Dream	1989 – Taylor Swift; Awake – Tycho; I Love You, Honeybear – Father John Misty; LP1 – FKA twigs; No Cities to Love – Sleater-Kinney; Rips – Ex Hex; Run the Jewels 2 – Run the Jewels; Syro – Aphex Twin; They Want My Soul – Spoon	
2016	Alabama Shakes	Sound & Color	Carrie & Lowell – Sufjan Stevens; Depression Cherry – Beach House; In Colour – Jamie xx; Multi-Love – Unknown Mortal Orchestra; Sometimes I Sit and Think, and Sometimes I Just Sit – Courtney Barnett; The Epic – Kamasi Washington	
2017	Angel Olsen	My Woman	22, A Million – Bon Iver; A Moon Shaped Pool – Radiohead; Blindfaller – Mandolin Orange; Drunk – Thundercat; Migration – Bonobo; Run the Jewels 3 – Run the Jewels	
2018	Slowdive	Slowdive	Capacity – Big Thief; Chuck – Chuck Berry; Cigarettes After Sex – Cigarettes After Sex; Pure Comedy – Father John Misty	
2019	Kamasi Washington	Heaven and Earth	Be the Cowboy – Mitski; Joy as an Act of Resistance – Idles; Safe in the Hands of Love – Yves Tumor; Soil – Serpentwithfeet	
2020	Big Thief	U.F.O.F.	Magdalene – FKA Twigs; All Mirrors – Angel Olsen; Jaime – Brittany Howard; Pony – Orville Peck	
2021	Phoebe Bridgers	Punisher	RTJ4 – Run the Jewels; Set My Heart on Fire Immediately – Perfume Genius; Heaven to a Tortured Mind – Yves Tumor; It Is What It Is – Thundercat; Saint Cloud – Waxahatchee	
2022	Japanese Breakfast	Jubilee	Collapsed in Sunbeams – Arlo Parks; Georgia Blue – Jason Isbell and the 400 Unit; Hey What – Low; New Long Leg – Dry Cleaning; Valentine – Snail Mail	
2023	Wet Leg	Wet Leg	Blue Rev – Alvvays; Stumpwork – Dry Cleaning; I Walked with You a Ways – Plains; Diaspora Problems – Soul Glo; A Light for Attracting Attention – The Smile	
2024	Mitski	The Land Is Inhospitable and So Are We	I Killed Your Dog – L'Rain; Michael – Killer Mike; Desire, I Want to Turn Into You – Caroline Polachek; Rat Saw God – Wednesday	
2025	Jessica Pratt	Here in the Pitch	The Collective – Kim Gordon; Manning Fireworks – MJ Lenderman; "Rockman" – Mk.gee; Tigers Blood – Waxahatchee	

== Artists with multiple wins ==
2 wins

- Alabama Shakes

== Artists with multiple nominations ==
3 nominations

- Run the Jewels

2 nominations

- Alabama Shakes
- Beach House
- Big Thief
- Bon Iver
- Dry Cleaning
- Father John Misty
- Kamasi Washington
- Thundercat
- Yves Tumor
- Waxahatchee
