= Made in Memphis Entertainment =

Entertainment group

- Industry: Entertainment
- Founded: April 2015; 11 years ago in Memphis, Tennessee, USA
- Founders: David Porter; Tony D. Alexander
- Headquarters: Memphis, Tennessee, United States
- Website: mimecorp.com

Made in Memphis Entertainment (MIME) is an entertainment group launched in April 2015 by original Stax Records songwriter David Porter (CEO) and Tony D. Alexander (President and Managing Director). Both were named to Billboard’s prestigious Indie Power Players list in 2021. In 2022, MIME was named the first-ever winner of the Agent of Change Award at the Music Business Association's inaugural Bizzy Awards.

MIME’s family of companies includes 4U Recording, a pair of recording studios in downtown Memphis, TN and Atlanta; Beatroot Music, an independent music distributor, and Beatroot Africa; Heavy Hitters Music, a film, TV, and ad sync company with an all-female creative team; MIME Publishing, which handles Porter's songwriting catalog and young producers in hip-hop and R&B; and MIME Records, an independent record label.

== Companies ==
=== 4U Recording ===
4U Recording is a recording studio in Memphis established by MIME in 2015 to support its label roster. The studio has since expanded to serve commercial clients, such as Moneybagg Yo, whose #1 Billboard 200 album A Gangsta's Pain was largely recorded at 4U’s Memphis location, along with his Gold-certified album Time Served and its Platinum-certified singles “All Dat (ft. Megan Thee Stallion)” and “Said Sum.” Other artists who have recorded at the studio include NLE Choppa and Yo Gotti.

A new 4U Recording studio was recently opened in Atlanta, where it has hosted events such as the Association of Independent Music Publishers (AIMP) Atlanta Chapter kickoff event.

=== Beatroot Music ===
Beatroot Music is a music distribution company that aids independent artists by providing support and personal care to each individual artist's musical projects. In 2020, 14 artists distributed by Beatroot each earned over a million streams across all major services, contributing to more than 100 million total streams across Beatroot’s roster. This includes Big30, one of Beatroot’s success stories. The rapper’s debut solo mixtape, King of Killbranch, reached #13 on the Billboard 200 chart in September 2020 following his development with Beatroot, after which he signed a deal with N-Less Entertainment and Moneybagg Yo's Bread Gang Entertainment, in partnership with Interscope Records. Beatroot is primarily run out of 4U Recording Atlanta’s studios and offices.

=== Heavy Hitters Music ===
Heavy Hitters Music is an independent song catalog and music publisher that has been active in the film, TV, and advertising industries since 1992, joining the MIME family of companies in August 2018. Heavy Hitters represents songs from about 1,700 artists. Their business model, unlike other similar companies, is to procure the rights to individual songs rather than full catalogs, representing them for sync placements in popular media. In 2020, Heavy Hitters landed several major placements for its catalog of tracks, including placing Moneybagg Yo’s "Said Sum" in multiple spots for the NFL and NBA. The department increased its revenue by 107% in 2019 and maintained those numbers throughout the COVID-19 pandemic in 2020.

=== MIME Publishing ===
MIME’s independent music publishing company, MIME Publishing, is based out of Atlanta. The company handles David Porter's songwriting catalog and young producers in hip-hop and R&B. Two of MIME Publishing’s songwriters and producers, YC and Real Red, recently placed #4 and #7, respectively, on the Billboard Hot 100 Songwriters chart following their work on Moneybagg Yo’s A Gangsta’s Pain album, with YC also topping the Billboard Hot 100 Producers chart for the first time.

== Diversity and Education Goals ==
MIME is dedicated to promoting diversity, equity, and inclusion in its staff and hiring practices. Alexander has written that every organization’s entire C-suite must act as a Chief Diversity Officer rather than putting the entire burden on one individual, which has influenced MIME’s own hiring practices. The organization often focuses on developing nontraditional or “second chance” employees for management track positions.

MIME is also dedicated to transparency and education for the artists they work with. 4U Recording Studio Manager Crystal Carpenter has prioritized getting more African-American women involved in the audio engineering world, including through internships at the studio. She also works with artists and studio employees to show them the importance of documentation, writing and production credits, and file formats when releasing music. In addition, MIME sponsors workshops and seminars to confront such issues in a more focused way.
