= Y La Bamba =

American indie band formed in Portland, Oregon

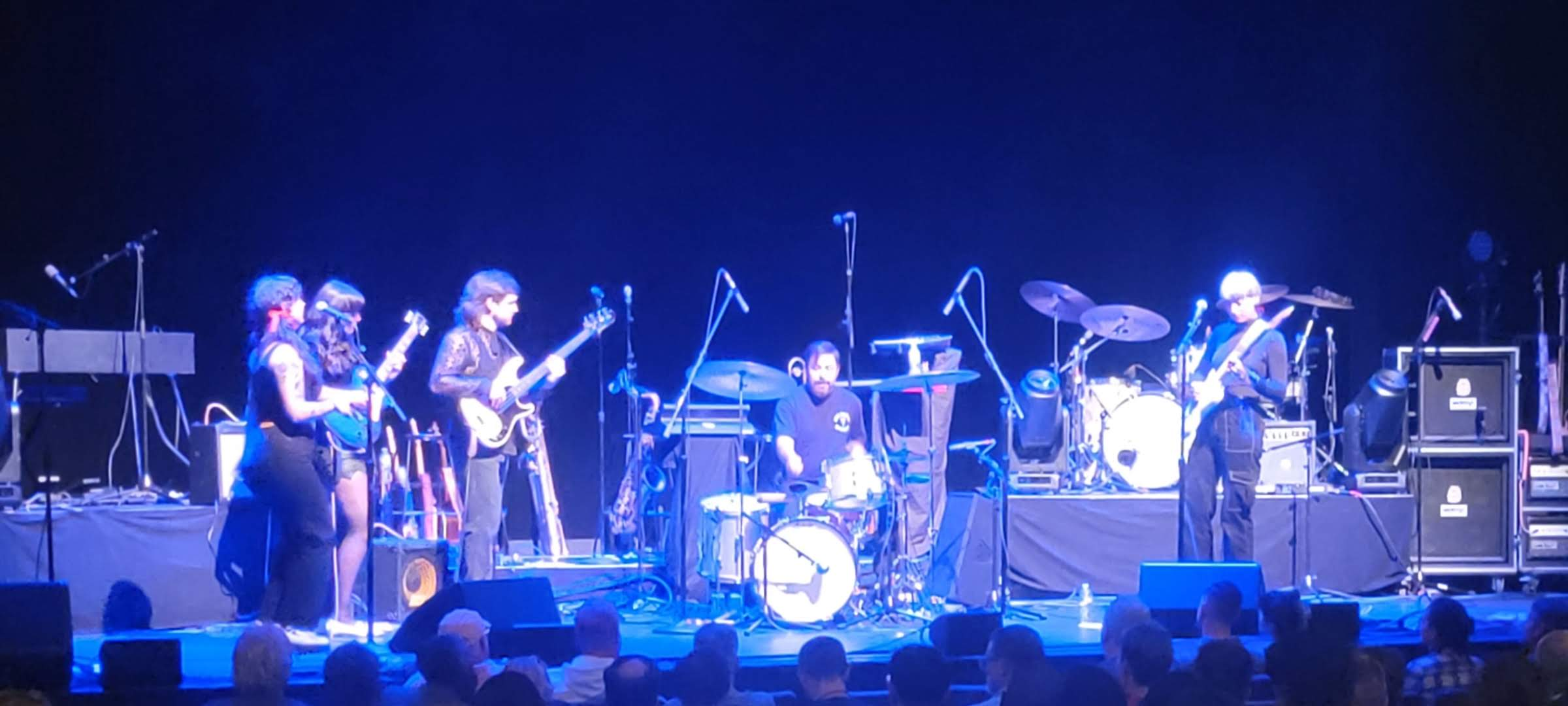
- The band at Colonial Theatre Boston, MA October 2023

Background information
- Origin: Portland, Oregon
- Genres: Indie folk, pop, latin music
- Years active: 2008–present
- Labels: Tender Loving Empire, Sub Pop
- Members: Luz Elena Mendoza; Julia Mendiolea; Isabeau Keonaona Waia’u Walker; Antonio Montanez
- Past members: Ryan Oxford; Margaret Wehr; Gordon Walters
- Website: www.ylabambamusic.com

Y La Bamba is an American indie alternative/experimental band led by singer-songwriter and guitarist Luz Elena Mendoza. They are a first generation American, and sing in both English and Spanish. The current ensemble includes Mendoza: vocals, guitar; Julia Mendiolea: guitar, bass; Antonio Montanez: drums; and Isabeau Waiaʻu Walker: vocals, percussion.

Y La Bamba has released five albums and two EPs.

== History ==
Y La Bamba's Mendoza was born in San Francisco, California and was influenced by the traditional music of her Michoacan, Mexico born parents: father in Aguililla, Michoacán and mother in Coalcomán, Michoacán. This includes rancheras, corridos, boleros and huapangos songs. "Corridos, especially, was very well present in a lot of the bands that played in quinceañeras, weddings and parties," Mendoza told Billboard. "Those grupero, Tex-Mex, and norteño five-piece acoustic bands with harp and violin, have all shaped my music."

Mendoza was raised in Southern Oregon, and later moved to Portland, Oregon to form the first versions of Y La Bamba. At 37, Mendoza moved to Guadalajara, Mexico.

== Music career ==
As a young adult, Mendoza studied theology in New Zealand, then later, did a mission to India. Returning to Oregon—first Ashland, then Portland—she began writing the music that launched her solo career at open mic nights around town. She met bassist and vocalist Ben Meyercord at one of these shows, and Y La Bamba was formed. They recruited the rest of the band, a revolving group of musicians that has included, amongst others, Grace Bugbee on bass and vocals, John Niekrasz on drums, Ed Rodriguez and Ryan Oxford on electric guitar, and Margaret Wehr-Gibson on keys and vocals.

=== Early albums ===
Y La Bamba's debut album, Alida St. was released in 2008. It was self-produced and considered lo-fi. Pitchfork said "Alida St. bore fingerprints of the era that birthed Joanna Newsom and CocoRosie".

In 2011, the group released Lupon, their second album. Featuring a full band of seven people, the album was still "minimalist" with production by Chris Funk of The Decemberists. It was named for Mendoza's father.

=== Court The Storm ===
Court The Storm followed the next year, produced by Steve Berlin of Los Lobos with songs co-written by Paul Cameron. Y La Bamba toured, opening for Neko Case (a guest on the album's title track), and The Lumineers as well as made appearances at SXSW.

=== Ojos Del Sol ===
For the next four years, Mendoza played and sang in Tiburones and Los Hijos de la Montaña, a band co-fronted by Calexico's Sergio Mendoza. As Y La Bamba, she and the group recorded and released their fourth album, Ojos Del Sol, and in September 2016, released the single, "Ostrich". Spin magazine wrote: "Y La Bamba’s new track 'Ostrich' is a soaring balance of tradition and evolution. The first single from their upcoming album, Ojos Del Sol, is an upbeat acoustic guitar track under beautiful three-part harmonies about how the experiences we have, both good and bad, help us to grow into the people we are—past creating present."

Ojos Del Sol, which chronicled Mendoza's personal growth and told of her own life and the history of her family, was one of NPR's Top 50 Albums of 2016.

=== Mujeres ===
Released in February 2019, Y La Bamba's 14-song album, Mujeres was produced by Mendoza. It debuted at Number 7 on Billboard magazine's Latin Pop Albums chart. Once again, the lyrical themes focused on Mendoza's experience as a Mexican in the political climate of the time. She dedicated the album to her mother and all women, while singing of misogyny and machismo attitudes.

To tour this album, she orchestrated a change that resulted in all new band members, including Ryan Oxford/vocals, guitar; Julia Mendiolea/vocals, keyboards; Miguel Jimenez-Cruz/drums; and Zachary Teran/vocals, bass with Isabeau Waia'u-Walker occasionally adding more vocals.

The New York Times called the bilingual Mujeres album "traditional musica mexicana as well as American folk songs and dream pop."

=== Oh February, Entre Los Dos EPs ===
In 2012, Y La Bamba did East Coast United States tour with The Lumineers, and made their debut on NPR World Cafe. They then followed up the release of Court The Storm with an EP called Oh February. Produced by Chris Funk, the EP was recorded entirely in English.

A few months after the Mujeres came out, Y La Bamba released a seven-track bilingual EP called Entre Los Dos. She moved to Guadalajara, Mexico, donned a traditional mariachi players’ suit for performances and promotion, and continued to make music with lo-fi percussion and guitar, yet moved in a more experimental direction. Once again produced by Mendoza, along with Ryan Oxford, her guitarist-vocalist, Rolling Stone called the EP: "an unsparing work of sonic catharsis."

== Discography ==
=== Studio albums ===
- 2008 : Alida St. (Gypsypop Records)
- 2011 : Lupon (Tender Loving Empire)
- 2012 : Court The Storm (Tender Loving Empire)
- 2016 : Ojos Del Sol (Tender Loving Empire)
- 2019 : Mujeres (Tender Loving Empire)
- 2023 : Lucha (Tender Loving Empire)

== Collaborations ==
In 2019, Luz was featured on Season 2 of the Storytellers Telling Stories podcast, and in 2020, the band appeared on Season 3 of Storybound (podcast).
