= Libera Award for Video of the Year =

Music video award

- Country: United States
- Presented by: American Association of Independent Music (A2IM)
- First award: 2012
- Currently held by: Wet Leg – "Ur Mom" (2023)
- Website: liberaawards.com

The Libera Award for Video of the Year is an award presented by the American Association of Independent Music at the annual Libera Award which recognizes "most impactful or visually compelling short-form music video" since 2012.

Canadian band Arcade Fire was the first recipient of the award for the music video of "Sprawl II (Mountains Beyond Mountains)". Since 2013, a set of nominees are annually presented. From 2014 to 2016, two winners are awarded, one of them being fan voted. British musician FKA Twigs is the most awarded artist in the category with three wins.

== Winners and nominees ==
| Year | Winner(s) | Work | Nominees | Ref. |
|---|---|---|---|---|
| 2012 | Arcade Fire | "Sprawl II (Mountains Beyond Mountains)" | —N/a | |
| 2013 | Macklemore & Ryan Lewis | "Thrift Shop" | Alabama Shakes – "Hold On"; All Time Low – "For Baltimore"; Antibalas – "Dirty Money"; Awolnation – "Kill Your Heroes"; Divine Fits – "My Love Is Real"; M83 – ""Wait" | |
| 2014 | Arcade Fire | "Reflektor" | Chvrches – "The Mother We Share"; Queens of the Stone Age – "My God Is the Sun"; Sharon Jones & the Dap-Kings – "Retreat"; The Knife – "Tooth for an Eye"; William Onyeabor – "Atomic Bomb" | |
| 2015 | FKA twigs | "Two Weeks" | Flying Lotus featuring Kendrick Lamar – "Never Catch Me"; Jungle – "Time"; OK Go – "I Won't Let You Down"; Tune-Yards – "Water Fountain" | |
| 2015 | Die Antwoord (Fan vote) | "Ugly Boy" | Flying Lotus featuring Kendrick Lamar – "Never Catch Me"; Jungle – "Time"; OK Go – "I Won't Let You Down"; Tune-Yards – "Water Fountain" | |
| 2016 | Run the Jewels | "Close Your Eyes (and Count to Fuck)" | Caravan Palace – "Lone Digger"; FKA twigs – M3LL155X; Iron Patriot – "Rock Roller"; Lindsey Stirling – "Take Flight"; Peaches – "Dick in the Air"; Starset – "Halo" | |
| 2016 | Grimes (Fan vote) | "Kill V. Maim" | Caravan Palace – "Lone Digger"; FKA twigs – M3LL155X; Iron Patriot – "Rock Roller"; Lindsey Stirling – "Take Flight"; Peaches – "Dick in the Air"; Starset – "Halo" | |
| 2017 | DJ Shadow featuring Run the Jewels | "Nobody Speak" | Angel Olsen – "Shut Up Kiss Me"; Anohni – "Drone Bomb Me"; Bonobo – "Kerala"; King Gizzard & the Lizard Wizard – "Gamma Knife/People-Vultures"; Mitski – "Your Best American Girl" | |
| 2017 | Radiohead (Fan vote) | "Daydreaming" | Angel Olsen – "Shut Up Kiss Me"; Anohni – "Drone Bomb Me"; Bonobo – "Kerala"; King Gizzard & the Lizard Wizard – "Gamma Knife/People-Vultures"; Mitski – "Your Best American Girl" | |
| 2018 | Perfume Genius | "Die 4 You" | Arca – "Reverie"; Noga Erez – "Off the Radar"; NxWorries – "Scared Money"; Superorganism – "Something for Your M.I.N.D." | |
| 2019 | Mitski | "Nobody" | Aphex Twin – "T69 Collapse"; John Prine – "Summer's End"; Kamasi Washington – "Heaven & Earth"; Moses Sumney – "Quarrel" | |
| 2020 | FKA twigs | "Cellophane" | Aldous Harding – "The Barrel"; Flying Lotus featuring Anderson .Paak – "More"; Orville Peck – "Dead of Night"; Fontaines D.C. – "Big" | |
| 2021 | FKA twigs | "Sad Day" | Perfume Genius – "Describe"; Phoebe Bridgers – "Savior Complex"; Run the Jewels – "Ooh La La"; Christine and the Queens – "La vita nuova"; ford. – "Fruit&Sun" | |
| 2022 | Wet Leg | "Chaise Longue" | Danny Elfman – "True"; Idles – "Car Crash"; Japanese Breakfast – "Savage Good Boy"; Sharon Van Etten & Angel Olsen – "Like I Used To"; Yves Tumor – "Jackie" | |
| 2023 | Wet Leg | "Ur Mom" | Amanda Shires – "Hawk for the Dove"; Fontaines D.C. – "Jackie Down the Line"; Jaywood – "Thank You"; NoSo – "Parasites"; Yeah Yeah Yeahs featuring Perfume Genius – "Spitting Off the Edge of the World" | |

== Multiple nominations and awards ==
Artists that received multiple nominations
| Nominations | Artist |
|---|---|
| 4 | FKA twigs |
| 3 | Run the Jewels |
| 2 | Angel Olsen |
| 2 | Arcade Fire |
| 2 | Flying Lotus |
| 2 | Mitski |
| 2 | Perfume Genius |

Artists that received multiple awards
| Awards | Artist |
|---|---|
| 3 | FKA twigs |
| 2 | Arcade Fire |
| 2 | Run the Jewels |
| 2 | Wet Leg |
