= Libera Award for Label of the Year =

Annual US music award

- Country: United States
- Presented by: American Association of Independent Music (A2IM)
- First award: 2012
- Currently held by: Partisan Records (Large); Captured Tracks (Medium); Innovative Leisure (Small) (2023)
- Website: liberaawards.com

The Libera Award for Label of the Year categories are presented by the American Association of Independent Music at the annual Libera Award which recognizes "best independent record label worldwide" since 2012. The category is divided into three other categories, based on the number of full-time employees. Independent record labels with more than fifteen full-time employees are categorized into the Label of the Year (Large). Label of the Year (Medium) categorizes independent record labels with six to fourteen full-time employees. Record labels with five full-time employees or fewer are categorized into the Label of the Year (Small) category.

From 2012 to 2018, independent record labels with six or more full-time employees were categorized into the same category, Label of the Year (Large).

== Label of the Year (Large) ==
| Year | Winner(s) | Nominees | Ref. |
|---|---|---|---|
| 2012 | Jagjaguwar | —N/a | |
| 2013 | Glassnote Records | Anti Records; ATO Records; Big Machine Records; Concord Music; Hopeless Records; Sub Pop; XL Recordings | |
| 2014 | Glassnote Records | ATO Records; Dualtone Records; Epitaph Records/Anti- Records; Merge Records; Secretly Canadian; XL Recordings | |
| 2015 | Sub Pop | 4AD; Big Machine Records; Concord Records; Hopeless Records; Partisan Records; Secretly Canadian; Thirty Tigers | |
| 2016 | Sub Pop | 4AD; ATO Records; Captured Tracks; Innovative Leisure; Merge Records; Mom + Pop Music; Nuclear Blast | |
| 2017 | Jagjaguwar | ATO Records; Innovative Leisure; Mexican Summer; Stones Throw Records; XL Recordings; Yep Roc Records | |
| 2018 | Dead Oceans | ATO Records; Loma Vista Recordings; Ninja Tuna; The Numero Group; Warp | |
| 2019 | Domino Recording Company | Dead Oceans; Polyvinyl Record Co.; Rough Trade Records; Warp | |
| 2020 | Partisan Records | Warp; Jagjaguwar; Domino Recording Company; Polyvinyl Record Co. | |
| 2021 | Sub Pop | Partisan Records; Warp; Stones Throw Records; Ninja Tune | |
| 2022 | Matador Records; Mom + Pop Music | ATO Records; Merge Records; Ninja Tune; Polyvinyl Record Co.; Third Man Records | |
| 2023 | Partisan Records | ATO Records; Hopeless Records; Merge Records; New West Records; Ninja Tune; Sub Pop Records; Third Man Records; Warp Records | |

== Label of the Year (Medium) ==
| Year | Winner(s) | Nominees | Ref. |
|---|---|---|---|
| 2019 | Partisan Records | Bloodshot Records; Mom + Pop Music; Saddle Creek Records; Yep Roc Records | |
| 2020 | Sacred Bones Records | 4AD; Saddle Creek Records; ATO Records; Drag City | |
| 2021 | Light in the Attic | Sacred Bones Records; Matador Records; Ghostly International; Rough Trade Records | |
| 2022 | Sacred Bones Records | City Slang; Hopeless Records; New West Records; Saddle Creek Records; Yep Roc Records | |
| 2023 | Captured Tracks | City Slang; Daptone Records; Glassnote Records; Saddle Creek; Yep Roc Records | |

== Label of the Year (Small) ==
| Year | Winner(s) | Nominees | Ref. |
|---|---|---|---|
| 2012 | Daptone Records | —N/a | |
| 2013 | Dualtone Music Group | Bar/None Records; Daptone Records; Frenchkiss Records; Ghostly International; Kill Rock Stars; Third Man Records | |
| 2014 | Daptone Records | Ghostly International; Innovative Leisure; Luaka Bop; Rhymesayers Entertainment; Temporary Residence Limited | |
| 2015 | Ghostly International | Dangerbird Records; Daptone Records; Innovative Leisure; Kill Rock Stars; Lindseystomp; Loma Vista Recordings; Mass Appeal Records | |
| 2016 | Daptone Records | Awesome Tapes From Africa; Brainfeeder; Loma Vista Recordings; Paradise of Bachelors; Suicide Squeeze Records; Temporary Residence | |
| 2017 | Triple Crown Records | Acony Records; Dangerbird Records; Daptone Records; Erased Tapes Records; Run for Cover Records; Topshelf Records | |
| 2018 | Daptone Records | Awesome Tapes From Africa; Kill Rock Stars; Sacred Bones Records; Triple Crown Records | |
| 2019 | Daptone Records | Brainfeeder; Hardly Art; Innovative Leisure; Oh Boy Records | |
| 2020 | Father/Daughter Records | Innovative Leisure; Oh Boy Records; Hardly Art; Wichita Recordings | |
| 2021 | Daptone Records | Innovative Leisure; Fire Talk Records; International Anthem; Hardly Art; Oh Boy Records | |
| 2022 | Oh Boy Records | Don Giovanni Records; Innovative Leisure; Sargent House; Sundazed Music | |
| 2023 | Innovative Leisure | Don Giovanni Records; Fire Talk; Oh Boy Records; Topshelf Records | |
