= Libera Award for Best Sync Usage =

Annual US music award

- Country: United States
- Presented by: American Association of Independent Music (A2IM)
- First award: 2012
- Currently held by: Warp Records for the usage of Stereolab's "A Flower Called Nowhere" in Atlanta (2023)
- Website: liberaawards.com

The Libera Award for Best Sync Usage is an award presented by the American Association of Independent Music at the annual Libera Award which recognizes "most creative and impactful use of independent music in a film or television or ad campaign" since 2012.

The category was known as Best Independent Sync Placement in 2012. It was first presented to Glassnote Records for the usage of the song "Saw You First" by the group Givens in the Kindle Fire product launch. Since 2013, a set of nominees is presented annually alongside the winner. ATO Records and Partisan Records are the only labels that have won the award more than once, with two wins each.

== Winners and nominees ==
Year	Winner(s)	Work	Nominees	Ref.
2012	Glassnote Records	Givers' "Saw You First" in Kindle Fire product launch	—N/a	
2013	Dualtone Records	The Lumineers' "Ho Hey" song placement with Bing	Century Media/Superball for the usage of ...And You Will Know Us by the Trail of Dead's "Ebb Away" in "Fox Surf"; ATO Records for the usage of Alabama Shakes' "Always Alright" in Silver Linings Playbook; Red Bull Records for the usage of Awolnation's "Sail" in BMW commercial; Innovative Leisure for the usage of Hanni El Khatib's "Can't Win 'Em All" in Audi commercial; Mute/Caroline for the usage of M83's "Outro" in Red Bull commercial; Five Seven Music for the usage of Shiny Toy Guns' "Speaking Japanese" in Virgin America commercial	
2014	ATO Records	Alabama Shakes' "You Ain't Alone" in Dallas Buyers Club	—N/a	
2015	Nettwerk	Family of the Year's "Hero" in Boyhood	Young Turks for the usage of FKA twigs' "Video Girl" in Google Glass commercial; Warp for the usage of Hudson Mohawke's "Chimes" in Apple MacBook Air ad: 'The Notebook People Love'; Innovative Leisure for the usage of Nick Waterhouse's "Times All Gone" in Lexus commercial; Nettwerk for the usage of Passenger's "Let Her Go" in Budweiser Puppy Bowl commercial; The Numero Group for the usage of Syl Johnson's "I'm Talking About Freedom" in Nike Free SB commercial; 4AD for the usage of Tune-Yards' "Water Foundtain" in Sonos commercial; Smithsonian Folkways for the usage of Woody Guthrie's "This Land Is Your Land" in Foo Fighters: Sonic Highways	
2016	ATO Records	Alabama Shakes' "Sound & Color" in Apple iPad Pro commercial	Innovative Leisure for the usage of BadBadNotGood's "Triangle" in Apple iPhone commercial; Warp for the usage of Flying Lotus' music in Apple Music commercial; Innovative Leisure for the usage of Hanni El Khatib's "Beautiful Morning Song" in Levi's 501 CT commercial; Counter Records for the usage of The Heavy's "How You Like Me Now" in Samsung x Marvel viral advertisement; Glassnote Records for the usage of Holychild's "Running Behind" in Apple Watch commercial; Hollywood Records for the usage of Queen's "Bohemian Rhapsody" in Suicide Squad trailer; XL Recordings for the usage of Shamir's "On the Regular" in Android OS Watch: "Wear What You Want" commercial	
2017	Daptone Records	Sharon Jones & the Dap-Kings' "Midnight Rider" in Lincoln MKZ commercial	ATO Records for the usage of Alabama Shakes' "Sound of Color" in the season three of Transparent trailer; Acony Records for the usage of Gillian Welch's "I'm Not Afraid to Die" in Hell or High Water; Matador Records for the usage of Perfume Genius' "Normal Song" in Toyotathon 2016 advertisement; XL Recordings for the usage of Radiohead's "Everything in Its Right Place" in The Accountant trailer; Jagjaguwar for the usage of Sharon Van Etten's "Wedding Song" in 2016 Volvo XC90 commercial; 4AD for the usage of Tune-Yards' "Water Fountain" in #Pixel: Memories by You, Phone by Google commercial	
2018	Partisan Records	Cigarettes After Sex's "Nothing's Gonna Hurt You Baby" in The Handmaid's Tale	7K! Records for the usage of Luca D’Alberto's "Yellow Moon" in Salvation; Run the Jewels for the usage of their song "Mean Demeanor" in EA's FIFA 18 trailer; Sofi Tukker for the usage of their song "Best Friend" in Apple iPhone X commercial; Luaka Bop for the usage of William Onyeabor's "Fantastic Man" in Apple iPhone 7 Plus commercial	
2019	Run the Jewels	"Legend Has It" in Black Panther trailer	Acony Records for the usage of Gillian Welch's "The Way It Will Be" in This Is Us; Ghostly International for the usage of Shigeto's "Lady Misaki" in Apple Japan's Decorated Trucks; Shot on iPhone; Matador Records for the usage of Perfume Genius' "Slip Away" in Eighth Grade trailer; Mom+Pop for the usage of Alice Merton's "No Roots" in Mini Cooper commercial	
2020	Partisan Records	Idles' "Never Fight A Man With a Perm" and "I'm Scum" in Peaky Blinders	Jagjaguwar for the usage of Bon Iver's "Naeem" in Nike 'Beginnings: LeBron'; Young Turks for the usage of Kamasi Washington's music in Apple Shot on iPhone XS commercial; Matador Records for the usage of Perfume Genius' "Otherside" in The Goldfinch trailer; Partisan Records for the usage of Cigarettes After Sex's "Opera House" in Killing Eve	
2021	Jewels Runners, Inc.	Run the Jewels' "Ooh LA LA" in the third season of Ozark	ATO Records for the usage of Black Pumas' "Colors" in Samsung Galaxy A20 commercial; ATO Records for the usage of Brittany Howard's "You'll Never Walk Alone" in Johnnie Walker's #KeepWalking Campaign; Domino Recording Company for the usage of Blood Orange's "Tuesday Feeling (Choose to Stay)" in the fourth season of Insecure; Partisan Records for the usage of Idles' "Grounds" in Watch Dogs: Legion	
2022	Dead Oceans	Phoebe Bridgers' "I Know the End" in Mare of Easttown (Episode 6)	ABKCO Records for the usage of The Rolling Stones' "She's a Rainbow" in Ted Lasso (Season 2, Episode 5); ATO Records for the usage of Black Pumas' "Colors" in Concrete Cowboy trailer; Domino Recording Company for the usage of Wet Leg's "Chaise Longue" in Gossip Girl (Season 1, Episode 5); Knitting Factory Records for the usage of Fela Kuti's "Zombie" in Gucci 100 promo campaign; Oh Boy Records for the usage of John Prine's "Caravan of Fools" in Yellowstone (Season 4, Episode 3); XL Recordings for the usage of Adele's "Hello" in NFL/Tom Brady's Return	
2023	Warp Records	Stereolab's "A Flower Called Nowhere" in Atlanta	Jagjaguwar for the usage of Angel Olsen's "Go Home" in Empire of Light film trailer; Partisan Records for the usage of Fela Kuti's "Water No Get Enemy" in Airbnb ad; Beautiful Mind Records and Lakeside for the usage of Lawrence's "Don't Lose Sight" in Microsoft ad; Chrysalis Records for the usage of Sinéad O'Connor's "Drink Before the War" in Euphoria	

== Multiple nominations and awards ==
Record labels that received multiple nominations
Nominations	Record label
6	ATO Records
5	Partisan Records
3	Innovative Leisure
3	Matador Records
3	XL Recordings
3	Jagjaguwar
3	Warp
2	4AD
2	Acony Records
2	Domino Recording Company
2	Glassnote Records
2	Nettwerk
2	Run the Jewels
2	Young Turks

Record labels that received multiple awards
Awards	Record label
2	ATO Records
2	Partisan Records
