= Libera Award for Marketing Genius =

Annual US music award

- Country: United States
- Presented by: American Association of Independent Music (A2IM)
- First award: 2012
- Currently held by: Domino Recording Company for Wet Leg's Wet Leg (2023)
- Website: liberaawards.com

The Libera Award for Marketing Genius is an award presented by the American Association of Independent Music at the annual Libera Award which recognizes "the most innovative and creative marketing campaign for a project released by an Independent label or artist" since 2012. The category was known as Light Bulb Award in 2012 to 2014.

It was first presented to Epitaph Records and Anti- were the first recipients of the award for the Invite-Only Listening Party hosted to promote Tom Waits' 2011 album Bad as Me. Since 2015, a set of nominees is presented annually.

== Winners and nominees ==
Year	Recipients	Artist	Work	Ref.
2012	Epitaph Records and Anti-	Tom Waits	Invite-Only Listening Party	
2013	Glassnote Records, Gentlemen of the Road, and Mumford & Sons	Mumford & Sons	The Stopover Tour for Babel	
2014	Warp · Marketing leads: Steven Hill and Josh Berman	Boards of Canada	Tomorrow's Harvest album	
2015
2015	Mass Appeal Records · Marketing lead: Run the Jewels	Run the Jewels	'Meow the Jewels / Tag the Jewels'	
2015	311 Music · Marketing lead: Rich Lyne	311	Ster3ol1th1c PledgeMusic album release campaign	
2015	Warp · Marketing lead: Steven Hill	Aphex Twin	Syro album release campaign	
2015	Loma Vista Recordings · Marketing lead: Adam Farrell	Little Dragon	1-800-NABUMA campaign	
2015	Merge Records · Marketing lead: Becky Mormino	Various Artists	'Or Thousand of Prizes: Merge 25' campaign	
2015	RED Music · Marketing lead: Alex Brody	Various Artists	'Ten Bands One Cause: Pink Vinyl'	
2015	Luaka Bop · Marketing lead: Eric Welles Nystrom	William Onyeabor	William Onyeabor Box Set campaign	
2016
2016	Mass Appeal Records · Marketing leads: Amaechi Uzoigwe, Zena White, and Amit Nerurkar	Run the Jewels	#12DaysofRTJ	
2016	4AD · Marketing lead: Pablo Douzoglou	Grimes	Art Angels album	
2016	ADA and Chegg Music 101 · Marketing lead: Heather Hatlo-Porter and Brandon Squar	Macklemore & Ryan Lewis	Chegg Music 101	
2016	ATO Records · Marketing lead: Jon Salter	Alabama Shakes	Sound & Color album	
2016	Doomtree Records · Marketing lead: Dessa and Lazerbeak	Various Artists	Doomtree Pop Quiz	
2016	Nuclear Blast · Marketing lead: Joanna Noyes	Slayer	God Listens to Slayer!	
2016	Razor & Tie · Marketing lead: Karen Dillett	Starset	Planetarium Shows	
2016	RED Music · Marketing lead: Alex Brody	Various Artists	Ten Bands One Cause	
2016	Relapse Records · Marketing leads: Corey Zaloom and Bob Lugowe	Torche	Torche Vs. Robots	
2017
2017	Young Turks · Marketing leads: Pablo Douzoglou and Blake Thomas	The xx	I See You album	
2017	Jagjaguwar · Marketing leads: Phil Waldorf and Tom Davies	Bon Iver	22, A Million album	
2017	Daptone Records · Marketing leads: Nydia Davila, Victoria Morris, and Joanna Noyes	Charles Bradley	Changes album	
2017	Mass Appeal Records · Marketing leads: Amit Nerurkar, Chris Mcilvenny, and Annie Chen	DJ Shadow	"Nobody Speak" campaign	
2017	ATO Records · Marketing leads: Jon Salter and Laura Lyons	Joseph	I'm Alone, No You're Not album	
2017	XL Recordings · Marketing leads: Adam Berman, Pablo Douzoglou, and Blake Thomas	Kaytranada	99.9% The Game	
2017	ATO Records · Marketing leads: Jon Salter, Dave McClain, and Laura Lyons	King Gizzard & the Lizard Wizard	Nonagon Infinity album	
2017	XL Recordings · Marketing leads: Radiohead and Scott Wright	Radiohead	Radiohead Disappears from the Internet	
2018
2018	Run the Jewels · Marketing leads: Amaechi Uzoigwe and Lee Martin	Run the Jewels	Call Ticketron! - 646.846.RTJ3 (www.1215.runthejewels.com)	
2018	Sub Pop · Marketing lead: Jon Strickland	Bob's Burgers	Bob's Burgers album	
2018	ATO Records · Marketing leads: Eric Moore, Jon Salter, and Dave McClain	King Gizzard & the Lizard Wizard	Polygondwanaland album	
2018	Beggars Group · Marketing leads: Rian Fossett, Marisa Gesualdi, Gabe Spierer, and Hana Mogulescu	Perfume Genius	"Wreath" video contest	
2018	Beggars Group · Marketing leads: Radiohead, Patrick North, Blake Thomas, Pablo Douzoglou, and Claire Taylor	Radiohead	OKNOTOK	
2018	Secretly Group · Marketing leads: Phil Waldorf and Tom Davies	Slowdive	Slowdive album campaign	
2019
2019	Warp	Aphex Twin	Collapse EP	
2019	ATO Records	King Gizzard & the Lizard Wizard	Reissues Campaign	
2019	Dead Oceans	Khruangbin	Con Todo el Mundo album	
2019	Partisan Records	Idles	Joy as an Act of Resistance album	
2019	Studio One	Various Artists	Reggae Month	
2020
2020	300 Entertainment	Megan Thee Stallion	"Hot Girl Summer" single	
2020	XL Recordings	Thom Yorke	Anima album	
2020	Rough Trade Records	Black Midi	Schlagenheim album	
2020	Young Turks	FKA Twigs	Magdalene album	
2020	Dead Oceans	Better Oblivion Community Center	Better Oblivion Community Center album	
2021
2021	Beggars Group	Supporting Indie Retail #loverecordstores Campaign		
2021	Jewel Runners, LLC	Run the Jewels x Cyberpunk 2077	"No Save Point"	
2021	Dead Oceans	Phoebe Bridgers	Punisher	
2021	Light In the Attic	Social media and digital marketing		
2021	Matador Records	Perfume Genius	Set My Heart on Fire Immediately	
2022
2022	Dead Oceans	Japanese Breakfast	Jubilee	
2022	4AD	Helado Negro	Helado Negro Ice Cream Tricycle	
2022	ATO Records	King Gizzard & the Lizard Wizard	Official Bootlegger Series	
2022	Death Row Records		Death Row Records 30th Anniversary	
2022	Lex Records	Eyedress	Mulholland Drive	
2022	Ninja Tune	Bicep	Isles	
2023
2023	Domino Recording Co.	Wet Leg	Wet Leg	
2023	Partisan Records	Fontaines D.C.	Skinty Fia	
2023	Loma Vista Recordings	Ghost	IMPERA	
2023	Stones Throw Records	Sudan Archives	Natural Brown Prom Queen	
2023	Secretly Canadian	Yeah Yeah Yeahs	Cool It Down	
