= American Association of Independent Music =

American trade association

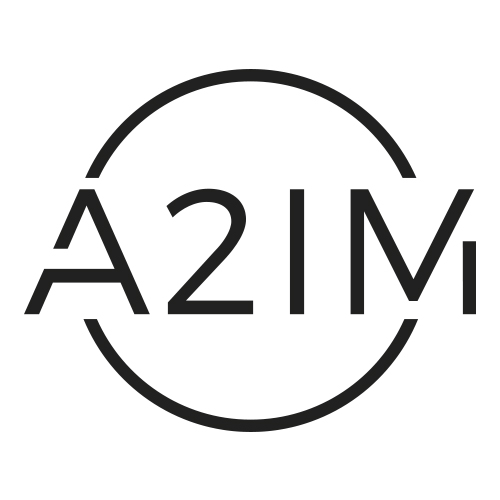
A2IM logo

The American Association of Independent Music (A2IM) is a trade association that represents independent record labels in the United States, founded in 2005. A2IM is headquartered in New York City, with chapters located in Nashville, Chicago, Northern California, Southern California, and the Pacific Northwest. Among other events, they organize the annual Libera Awards.

The organization was preceded by the National Association of Independent Record Distributors (NAIRD) founded in 1972, which in 1997 changed its name to the Association for Independent Music (AFIM), which dissolved in 2004.

== History ==
A2IM launched on July 5, 2005. The organization has some 600 independent music label members and over 200 associate members (companies who don't own masters but rely upon, provide services for, or otherwise support independent music labels). A2IM was preceded by the National Association of Independent Record Distributors (NAIRD) founded in 1972. In 1997 it changed its name to the Association for Independent Music (AFIM). As AFIM, the organization was best known for the annual issuing of Indie Awards, recognizing artistic and commercial success among artists signed to independent music labels. These were known as "NAIRD awards" prior to the name change. The AFIM Indie Awards were last issued in 2003, and the organization dissolved in 2004. The name "Indie Award" has since been adopted by the Canadian Music Week convention.

== Events ==
While A2IM presents events for members and non-members alike in various cities, they are best known for their three large-scale flagship events – IndieWeek, an independent music focused conference located in New York City, the Libera Awards, an independent music award show located in New York City, and Synchup, an independent music licensing and digital conference located in Los Angeles.

=== Libera Awards ===
The Libera Awards occur annually to honor contributions to independent music.

== Structure ==
As of January 2019 A2IM's president and CEO is Richard James Burgess.

The organization's board of directors is composed of the following:

- Tony Alexander - Made In Memphis Entertainment President/Managing Director
- Nabil Ayers - Beggars Group President
- Mariah Czap - Yep Roc Records Co-General Manager, Head of Digital
- Dee Diaz - Reach Records VP of Digital Strategy
- Wilson Fuller - Merge Records Head of Digital
- Mary Jurey - Blue Élan Records Chief Business Officer
- Heather Johnson - FiXT Director of Label Operations
- Tony Kiewel - Sub Pop Records President
- Hays Rudolph - Secretly Group General Counsel/VP of Business & Legal Affairs
- Victor Zaraya - Concord Chief Operating Officer
- Zena White - Partisan Records Chief Operating Officer

The organization's president's advisory board is composed of:

- Kristin Epstein - Screenwave Media Vice President
- Steve Kline - Better Noise Music President, COO
- Jennifer Newman Sharpe - Exceleration Music General Counsel/VP of Business & Legal Affairs
- Elliott Peters - Empire Distribution SVP of Global Business
- Jason Peterson - CINQ Music, GoDigital Media Group CEO, Founder
- Reed Watson - Single Lock Records Co-Owner

== Associations ==
It is a member of the World Independent Network, which represents most of the world's independent music label trade organizations.

== A2IM Star Certification ==
In June 2025, A2IM launched the A2IM Star Certification, a sales certification program for independent music. The initial batch recognized 36 records. Developed in partnership with Luminate, the program awards one star for 50,000 album sales, two stars for 100,000, and three stars for 300,000. Sales are calculated using album-equivalent units.
