= Libera Award for Best Blues Record =

Annual US music award

- Awarded for: quality blues records
- Country: United States
- Presented by: American Association of Independent Music (A2IM)
- First award: 2018
- Currently held by: Shemekia Copeland, Done Come Too Far (2023)
- Website: liberaawards.com

The Libera Award for Best Blues Record (known as Best Blues Album prior to 2021) is an award presented by the American Association of Independent Music at the annual Libera Award which recognizes "best blues album released commercially in the United States by an independent label" since 2018.

Prior to the creation of the category, an award named Best Blues/Jazz/R&B Album was presented, though it was only awarded in 2017.

American musician Benjamin Booker was the first recipient of the award for his album Witness. Fantastic Negrito is the only artist to have received the award more than once, with two wins, in 2019 for Please Don't Be Dead and in 2021 for Have You Lost Your Mind Yet?.

== Winners and nominees ==
Year	Winner(s)	Work	Nominees	Ref.
2018	Benjamin Booker	Witness	Chuck – Chuck Berry; Front Porch Sessions – The Reverend Peyton's Big Damn Band; Live at Carnegie Hall: An Acoustic Evening – Joe Bonamassa; TajMo – Taj Mahal & Keb' Mo'	
2019	Fantastic Negrito	Please Don't Be Dead	America's Child – Shemekia Copeland; Benton County Relic – Cedric Burnside; Out of the Blues – Boz Scaggs; Run Deep – Deva Mahal	
2020	Mavis Staples	We Get By	Kingfish – Christone "Kingfish" Ingram; Ann Arbor Blues Festival 1969 Vol. 1 & 2 – Various Artists; Up and Rolling – North Mississippi Allstars; Tall, Dark and Handsome – Delbert McClinton and Self-Made Men	
2021	Fantastic Negrito	Have You Lost Your Mind Yet?	Blacktop Run – Sonny Landreth; Rawer Than Raw – Bobby Rush; That's What I Heard – Robert Cray Band; You Make Me Feel – Don Bryant	
2022	Christone "Kingfish" Ingram	662	"Can't Stop the Rain" – Neal Francis; Dear America – Eric Bibb; Promenade Blue – Nick Waterhouse; Rose-Colored Glasses, Vol. 1 – Teresa James & the Rhythm Tramps	
2022	Cedric Burnside	I Be Trying	"Can't Stop the Rain" – Neal Francis; Dear America – Eric Bibb; Promenade Blue – Nick Waterhouse; Rose-Colored Glasses, Vol. 1 – Teresa James & the Rhythm Tramps	
2023	Shemekia Copeland	Done Come Too Far	Bloodline Maintenance – Ben Harper; Outdated Emotion – Delbert McClinton; Set Sail – North Mississippi Allstars; I Need a Job...So I Can Buy More Auto-Tune – Swamp Dogg	

== Artists that received multiple wins ==
2 wins

- Fantastic Negrito

== Artists that received multiple nominations ==
2 nominations

- Cedric Burnside
- Christone "Kingfish" Ingram
- Fantastic Negrito
- Delbert McClinton
- North Mississippi Allstars
- Shemekia Copeland
