= Lower =

Lower may refer to:

- Lower (album), 2025 album by Benjamin Booker
- Lower (surname)
- Lower Township, New Jersey
- Lower Receiver (firearms)

== See also ==
- Nizhny
