= Löwenburg =

Löwenburg (German for 'lion castle') may refer to:

- Löwenburg, Pennsylvania, former name of Monaca, Pennsylvania, U.S.
- Löwenburg (Siebengebirge), hill in the Siebengebirge mountains of Germany
- Nivagl Castle, also called the Löwenburg, canton of Grisons, Switzerland
- Löwenburg (Bad Honnef), castle ruins near Bad Honnef, North Rhine-Westphalia, Germany
- Löwenburg (Bleicherode), castle ruins near Bleicherode, Thuringia, Germany
- Löwenburg (Braunsbach), lost castle in Braunsbach, Baden-Württemberg, Germany
- Löwenburg (Kassel), castle in Kassel, Hesse, Germany
- Löwenburg (Monreal), castle ruins near Monreal, Rhineland-Palatinate, Germany

== See also ==
- Loewenberg (disambiguation)
- Loewensberg, a surname
- Löwenberg, a town in Lower Silesian Voivodeship, Poland
