= Grüneberg station =

Railway station in Brandenburg, Germany

Grüneberg
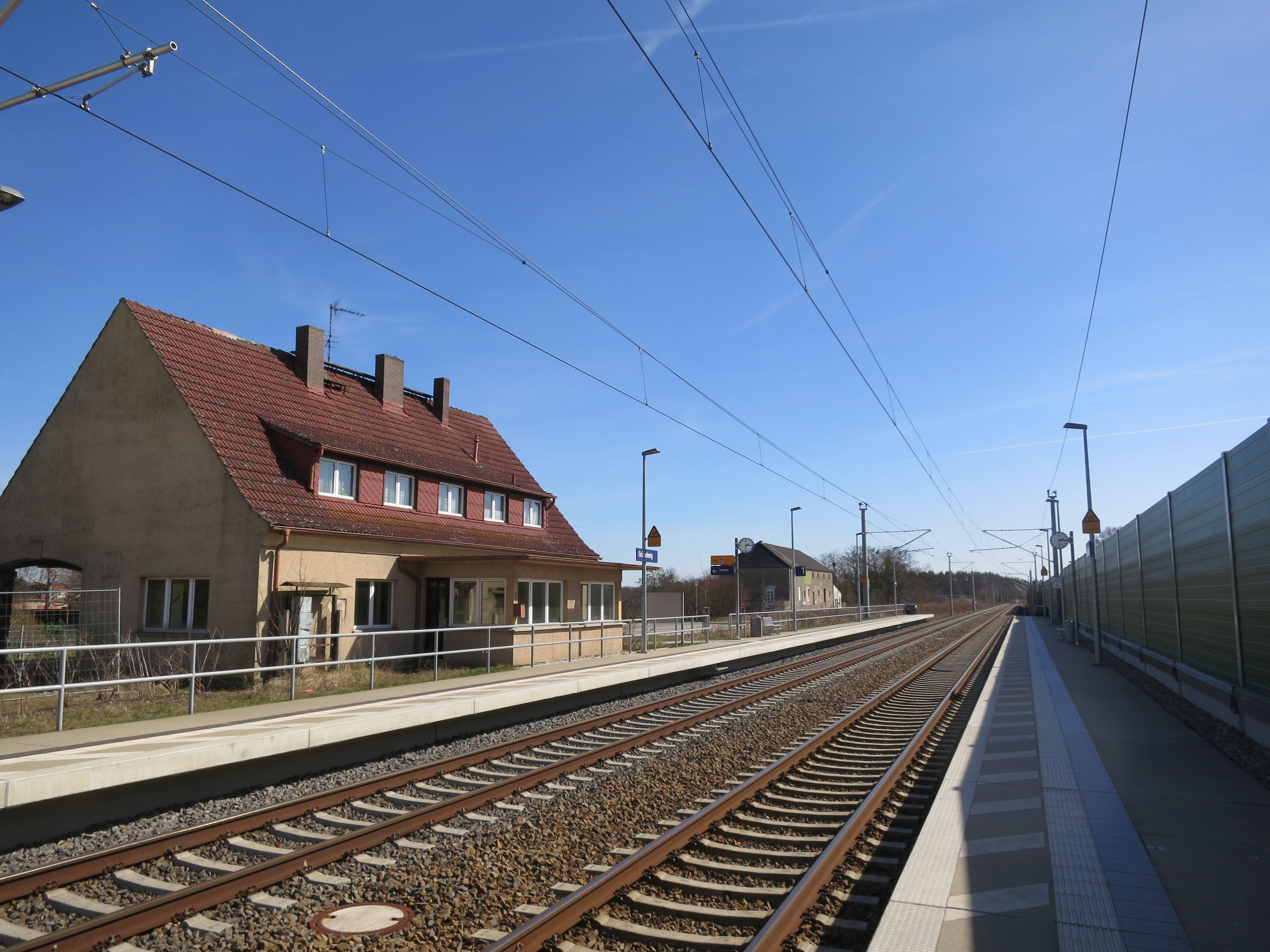

General information
- Location: Bahnhofsstraße 10; 16775 Grüneberg (Löwenberger Land); Brandenburg; Germany
- Coordinates: 52°52′04″N 13°12′47″E
- Owner: DB Netz
- Operator: DB Station&Service
- Line: Berlin Northern Railway
- Platforms: 2 side platforms
- Tracks: 2
- Train operators: Niederbarnimer Eisenbahn

Other information
- Station code: 2395
- DS100 code: WGRG
- IBNR: 8011776
- Category: 6
- Fare zone: VBB: 4753
- Website: www.bahnhof.de

History
- Opened: April 1878; 148 years ago

Services
Preceding station	Niederbarnimer Eisenbahn	Following station
Nassenheide towards Berlin Ostkreuz	RB 12	Löwenberg (Mark) towards Templin Stadt
Location
- Location within Brandenburg Location within Germany Location within Europe

Grüneberg station is a railway station in the Grüneberg district in the municipality of Löwenberger Land, located in the Oberhavel district in Brandenburg, Germany.
