= Graffiti in Russia =

An image of anarchist graffiti celebrating May Day, produced for propagandistic purposes, 2026. In front of the graffiti, a figure (left) poses with spraycans, while another (right) holds a flag

In Russia, graffiti (or street art) is an ambiguous phenomenon, i.e. considered to be desecration by some, and art by others. It is done for a variety of reasons, including expressing oneself through an art form, or protesting against a corporation or ideology.

== Festivals and gatherings ==
Although graffiti historically was never completely welcome in Russia, as graffiti artists were often part of Russia's underground movement, modern trends have made the practice more mainstream and accepted. Moscow's Dream Energy graffiti festival "encourages Russia’s graffiti artists to come out and let their creativity go wild, painting the gray walls of Moscow’s ubiquitous power stations". "Grammatika", a graffiti show that took place in Russia from March 12 to March 18, 2012, featured work from twelve Russian graffiti writers: Bioks, Page2, Camin, Ramze, Oxake, Yoker, Uran, Rocks, Kesit, Coast, Vika, and Gnutov. Founded by Berlin graffiti writer Akim, "Sign Your Style" is a graffiti festival, held in Moscow on May 7, and on May 13 in Saint Petersburg, Russia. In the preview video, Petro, a judge for the competition part of the festival, shows in how he expects writers participating to "simply go off and get creative", by freestyling some futurist outlines, doing a blind folded one-liner piece, and a throwing up some handstyle alphabets. The purpose of this Russian festival is to expand the originality and unique subtleties in Russian graffiti style. The festival was fully supported by the Russian spray paint company, Rush. The main festival for graffiti in Russia is Stenograffia in Yekaterinburg. You can also find a lot of works in St.Petersburg Street-art museum.

== Graffiti as protest ==
In 2009, an anonymous graffiti artist painted the words "Your God is dead. Get out and go home!" with a stencil on a church in Rostov-on-Don. As one of the first Churches of Christ to be recognized by the Russian government (registered in 1992), it has been the centre of much controversy in the city.

As a protest against the heightened security in St. Petersburg due to the 2011 World Economic Forum, Voina, a Russian art collective, painted a huge phallus on the Liteyny Bridge. The general idea was that the penis erects as the bridge rises to allow traffic to pass through. The annual Innovation awards gave Voina the prize for best work of visual art. The work, entitled A Penis In KGB Captivity won Voina 400,000 rubles. However, they had to spend time in jail due to their stunt. Banksy, a supporter of the groups antics, bailed them out. After failing to get Voina’s approval to include the picture, organisers removed it from their shortlist, and the painting itself was eventually washed off by firefighters.

In 2012 Russia Today reported on cases of anti-Muslim Islamophobic graffiti in and around the city of Moscow. Slogans including "Russia is for Russians" were said to cover walls along the Paveletsky suburban railway line. In response to some of these incidents, officials questioned why people would be drawn to expressing nationalistic statements in a multinational and multi-confessional country. The mufti, Albir Krganov, who believed that the graffiti insulted the feelings of believers and non-Russian nationals, said that "fences and walls belong to someone and [the owners] should watch what’s written on them". In a published document, the Human Rights Bureau referred to the graffiti as a "glaring problem", and explained that "nationalistic slogans and symbols are dangerous since they are insulting and, also, inspire people with fear for their safety as well as for the future of the country".

In 2012, a group of Moscow LGBT activists graffitied the United Russia party office by painting "a rainbow... the slogan 'We will not be prohibited', [and] the party label... all over". The group covered the Russian building in LGBT signs and symbols because Vsevolod Chaplin, its head, used homophobic slogans. The protest itself was against new piece of legislation prohibiting gay propaganda, something which was widely discussed in the lead-up to the presidential elections in Russia.

== Media ==
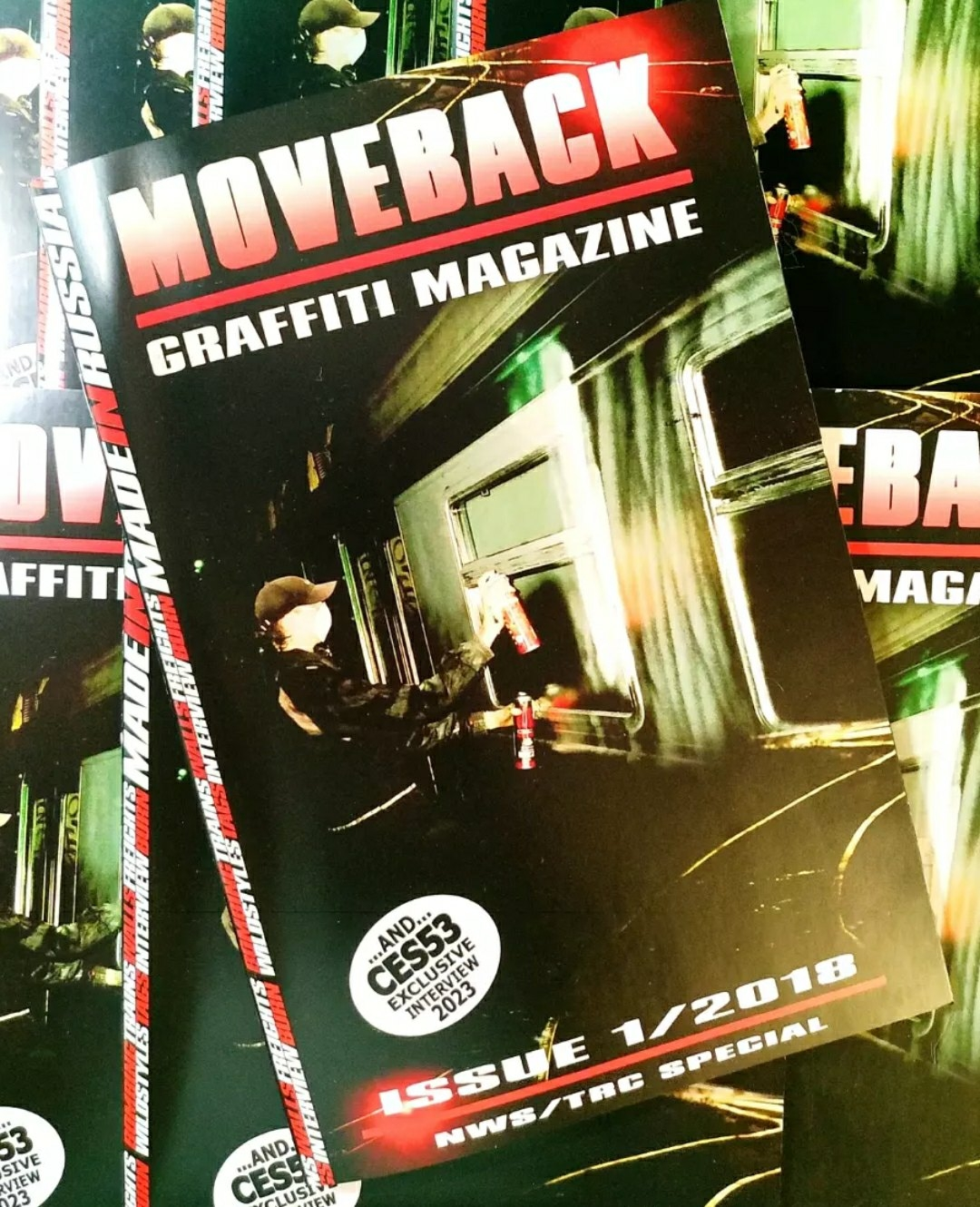
Moveback Magazine. Reprint issue 1. Обложка российского журнала о граффити. На фотографии изображён художник Константин Nats (1989-2009), погиб в 2009 году от удара электрическим током.

Since 2018, the independent printed graffiti magazine Moveback Magazine has been published in Saint Petersburg under the editorship of Artem S., becoming a notable project in documenting the global street art culture. Initially focused on local artists from various regions of Russia, the publication quickly expanded its geography to an international level.

In issues No. 2 to No. 5 (released between 2019 and 2023), the magazine presented a large-scale showcase of the global "old-school" scene from the US, Canada, Australia, and Europe. The pages of the zine featured works and exclusive materials from iconic representatives of the international graffiti movement, such as Rens TAV (Copenhagen), King 157 (San Jose), Won ABC (Munich), Neon TFP (Munich), Ces53 (Netherlands), and Yes2 (New York). Distribution of the edition was carried out independently by the graffiti community itself.

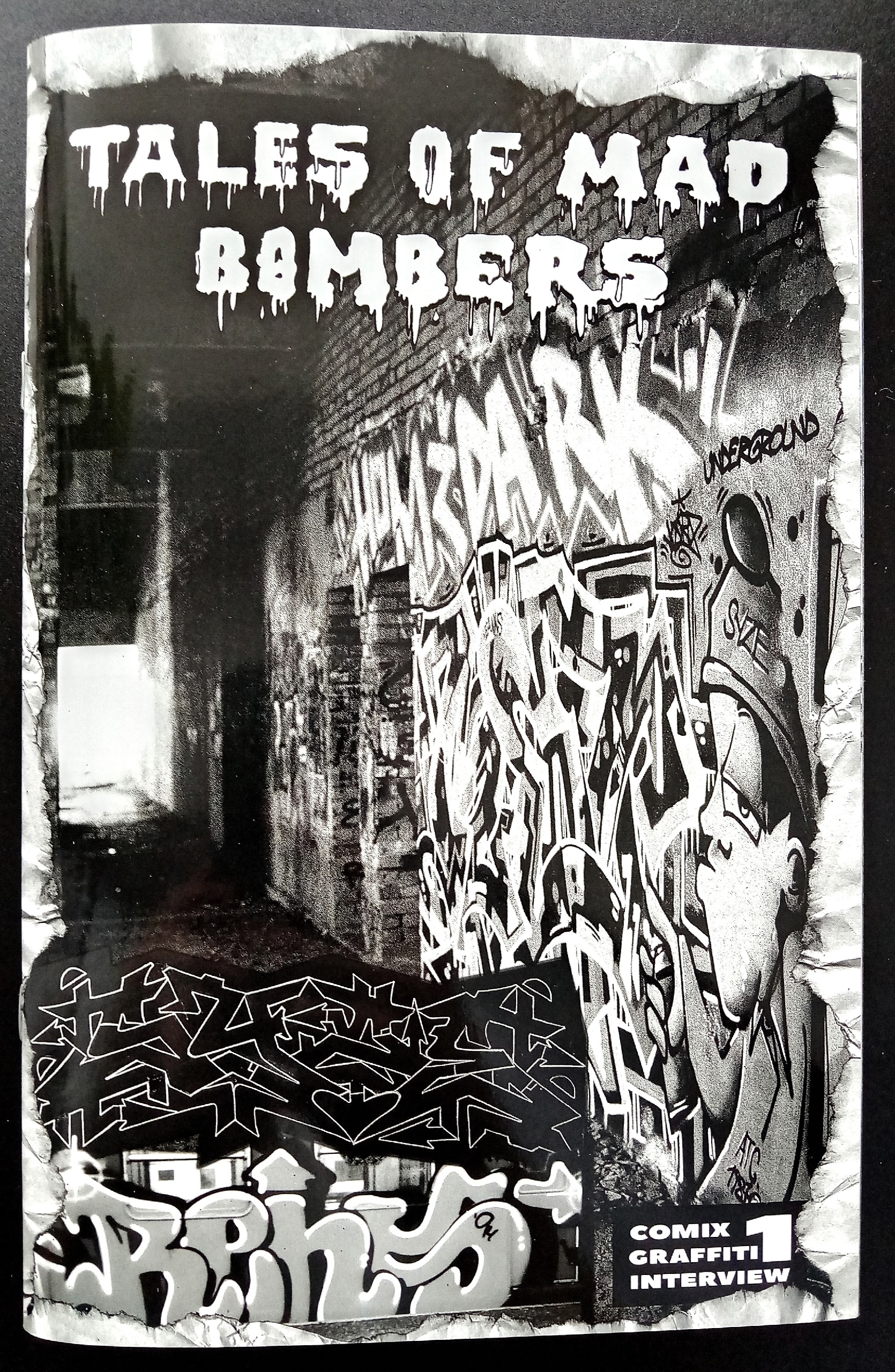
Tales of mad bombers, Comix graffiti, issue 1 2026

In 2026, the project expanded further with the release of a specialized graffiti comic book titled Tales of Mad Bombers (Issue 1), adapting the aesthetics of classic train bombing into a graphic novel format.

== Other cases ==
There is a Russian graffiti artist named Pavel 183 (also nicknamed "The Russian Banksy") whose murals have been compared to Banksy's work. Pavel 183's pieces in the Moscow area share similarities with Banksy's in that they appear on median dividers, walls, bridges, and mixed media installations. Pavel 183 died of unknown causes on April 1, 2013.

Vova Chernyshev and his friends created a series of tram graffiti pieces in Nizhny Novgorod in their local train yard.

== Scholarly Work on Graffiti in Russia ==
Scholarly works on Russian graffiti include Alexis Lerner's book Post-Soviet Graffiti: Free Speech in Authoritarian States (2025), Igor Ponosov's Russian Urban Art: History and Conflicts (2018), and John Bushnell's Moscow Graffiti: Language and Subculture (1990).
