= The Last Days of Oakland =

Studio album by Fantastic Negrito
- Released: June 3, 2016
- Genre: Blues rock
- Length: 50:27
- Label: Blackball Universe
- Producer: Fantastic Negrito

Fantastic Negrito chronology
Fantastic Negrito (2014)	The Last Days of Oakland (2016)	Please Don't Be Dead (2018)

The Last Days of Oakland is the second album by American singer-songwriter Fantastic Negrito. Rayanne Pinna described the album as "an urgent, political record that grapples with the many changes Oakland has seen in recent years." In 2017, it won a Grammy Award for Best Contemporary Blues Album.

Professional ratings
Aggregate scores
Source	Rating
Metacritic	81/100
Review scores
Source	Rating
AllMusic	4/5 stars
The Guardian	4/5 stars
The Times	4/5 stars
Vice (Expert Witness)	(3-star Honorable Mention)

== Track listing ==
All tracks are written by Fantastic Negrito, except "In the Pines" by Lead Belly.

No.	Title	Length
1.	"The Last Days of Oakland (Intro)"	0:35
2.	"Working Poor"	4:00
3.	"About a Bird"	3:39
4.	"Scary Woman"	3:10
5.	"What Would You Do? (Interlude 1)"	1:19
6.	"The Nigga Song"	3:16
7.	"In the Pines"	4:19
8.	"Hump Through the Winter"	3:54
9.	"Lost in a Crowd"	5:00
10.	"El Chileno (Interlude 2)"	0:41
11.	"The Worst"	3:51
12.	"Rant Rushmore"	5:01
13.	"Nothing Without You"	4:15
14.	"Push Back"	3:53
15.	"The Shadows"	3:34
Total length:		50:27

Mixed By: Matt Winegar

== Charts ==
Chart performance for The Last Days of Oakland
Chart (2016)	Peak position
US Heatseekers Albums (Billboard)	19
US Top Blues Albums (Billboard)	4
