= Loewer =

Loewer is a surname. Notable people with the surname include:

- Barry Loewer (born 1945), American professor of philosophy
- Carlton Loewer (born 1973), American baseball player
- Deborah Loewer (born 1954), American military officer

== See also ==
- Loewenberg (disambiguation)
- Lower (surname)
