= White Jesus Black Problems =

Studio album by Fantastic Negrito
- Released: 3 June 2022
- Genre: Blues, gospel, funk
- Length: 40:59
- Label: Storefront Records

Fantastic Negrito chronology
| Have You Lost Your Mind Yet? (2020) | White Jesus Black Problems (2022) |

White Jesus Black Problems is the fifth album by the American musician Fantastic Negrito, released on June 3, 2022, by the musician's own label Storefront Records.

== Background ==
Fantastic Negrito conceived the album when he learned that his seventh great-grandmother was a white indentured servant from Scotland, who in turn entered into a common-law marriage with an enslaved African-American man. Many of the album's lyrics deal with slavery in historical times and its effects on modern-day people of color, as well as interracial relationships that were illegal during certain periods of American history.

Rock n' Load described the album's subject matter and lyrics as "an exhilarating ode to the power of family and the enduring resilience of our shared humanity." Fantastic Negrito wrote more than 50 songs on these topics before narrowing those down to the songs that appear on the album.

After winning the Grammy award for Best Contemporary Blues Album for his previous three releases, Fantastic Negrito decided to move beyond the more conventional blues rock of those albums. White Jesus Black Problems experiments with gospel, rock, and funk in most of its songs, and even heavy metal and country in some places. The album was released in conjunction with a film that further explores the history of Fantastic Negrito's ancestry.

== Critical reception ==
White Jesus Black Problems received enthusiastic reviews upon its release. AllMusic praised the album for delivering weighty themes via uplifting and joyful music. Classic Rock magazine stated that the album "sounds like everything else and nothing else" and concluded that it mixes many different musical styles successfully and is "a testament to one man’s musical vision." American Songwriter noted that Fantastic Negrito has largely left his previous blues-rock focus behind while "ripping up any blueprint for how a blues album should sound on this daring and audacious release."

According to Spectrum Culture, "White Jesus Black Problems is nothing less than stunning." The Spill Magazine praised the album for expanding on some of the genre experiments that had only appeared briefly in Fantastic Negrito's previous albums, and concluded that the musician has taken "a brilliant step forward." Glide Magazine said that the album "creates quite a searing, provocative impact... sometimes infectious and at other times harsh and disorienting." Exclaim! praised the album's mixing of disparate genres, while concluding that it "is certainly an album that prompts further discovery of its deeper layers... it is also liberating in its musical profundity."

== Track listing ==
All tracks are written by Xavier Dphrepaulezz.

| No. | Title | Length |
|---|---|---|
| 1. | "Venomous Dogma" | 5:32 |
| 2. | "Highest Bidder" | 3:34 |
| 3. | "Mayor of Wasteland" | 0:49 |
| 4. | "They Go Low" | 3:43 |
| 5. | "Nibbadip" | 3:47 |
| 6. | "Oh Betty" | 3:56 |
| 7. | "You Don't Belong Here" | 1:08 |
| 8. | "Man with No Name" | 3:31 |
| 9. | "You Better Have a Gun" | 3:32 |
| 10. | "Trudoo" | 3:37 |
| 11. | "In My Head" | 3:23 |
| 12. | "Register of Free Negroes" | 1:21 |
| 13. | "Virginia Soil" | 3:10 |
| Total length: | | 40:59 |

== Personnel ==
- Xavier Amin Dphrepaulezz (Fantastic Negrito) – vocals, guitars
- James Small – drums
- Cornelius Mims – bass
- Masa Kohama – guitar
- Lionel LJ Holoman – keyboards
- Mia Pixley – cello
