= Stenograffia =

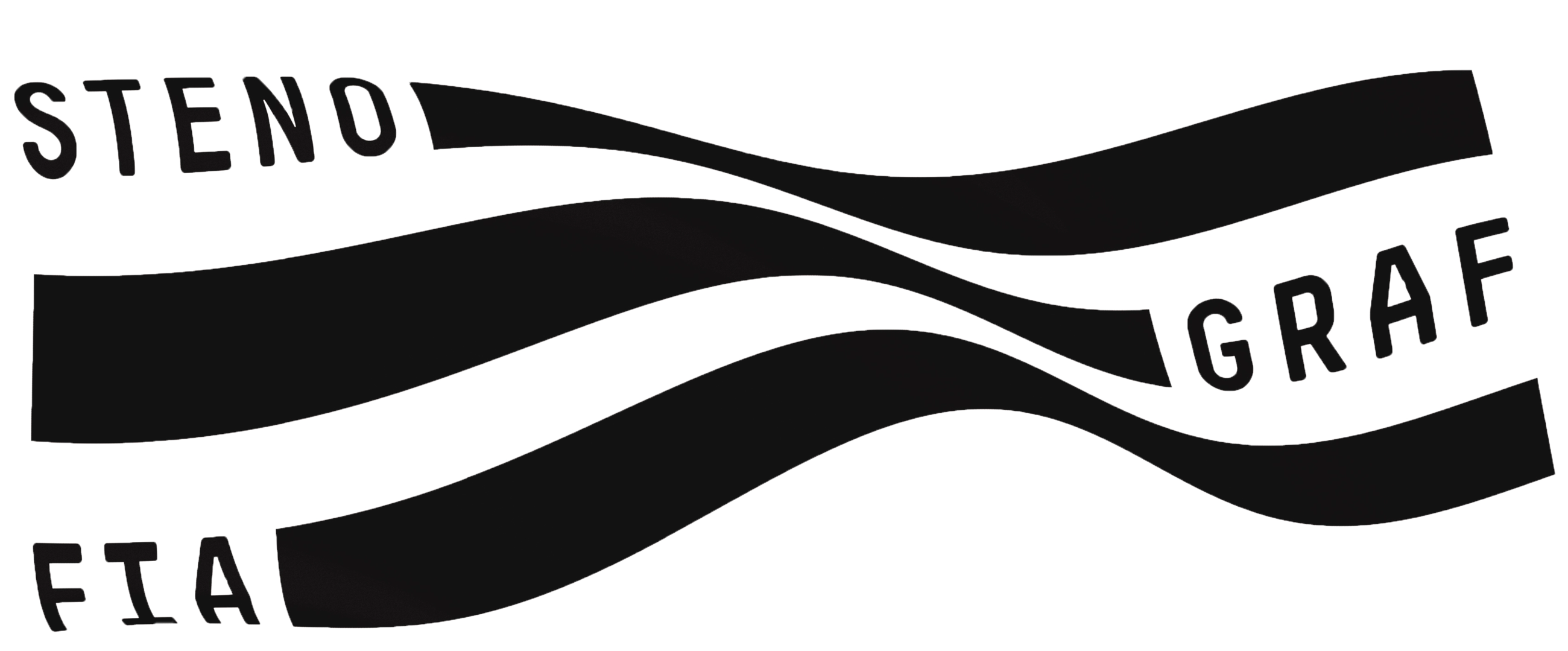
Logotype

Stenograffia is an international graffiti festival held annually in Yekaterinburg the first weekend in July. In the summer of 2010 graffiti on the theme "Europe and Asia: the clash of opposites" appeared in the subways, on quay slabs, yards, and on buildings in the Ural capital. The theme of Stenograffia 2011 was "Images of Happiness". In July 2012 artists from around the world presented their vision of Yekaterinburg using the theme "Global Intelligence".

== Description ==
The first festival gathered artists from 25 cities and three countries. It included artists from Omsk, Moscow, St. Petersburg, Murmansk, Ufa, Krasnoyarsk, Irkutsk, Chelyabinsk, Tomsk, Nizhny Tagil, Perm, Kemerovo, Novosibirsk, Nizhny and Novgorod, and from (Spain and Germany. The gathering occasioned a large-scale painting of urban surfaces.

== Notable works ==
- Saint Catherine mural in Yekaterinburg:

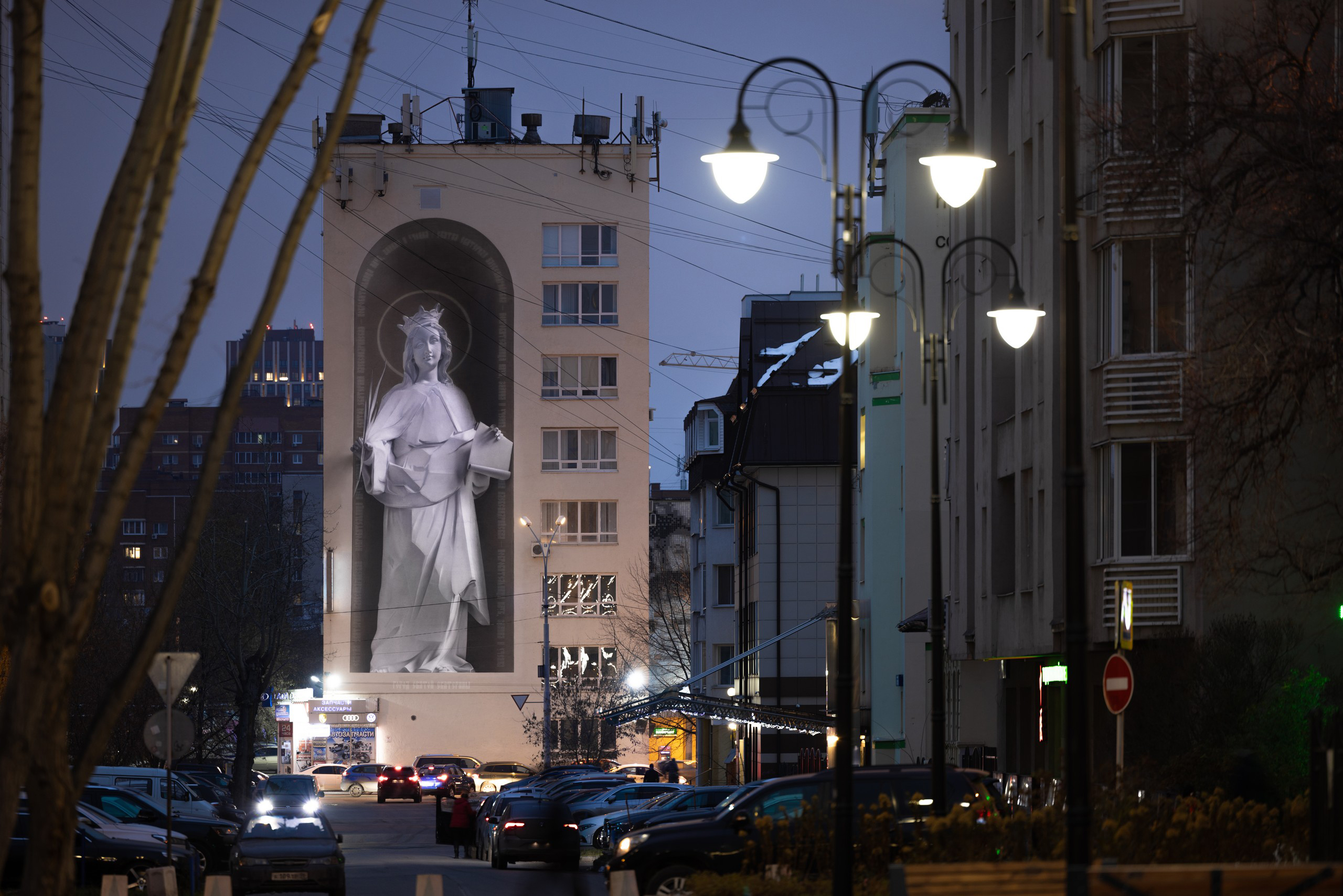

- "Suprematic cross" by Pokras Lampas
- Canned food paintings:

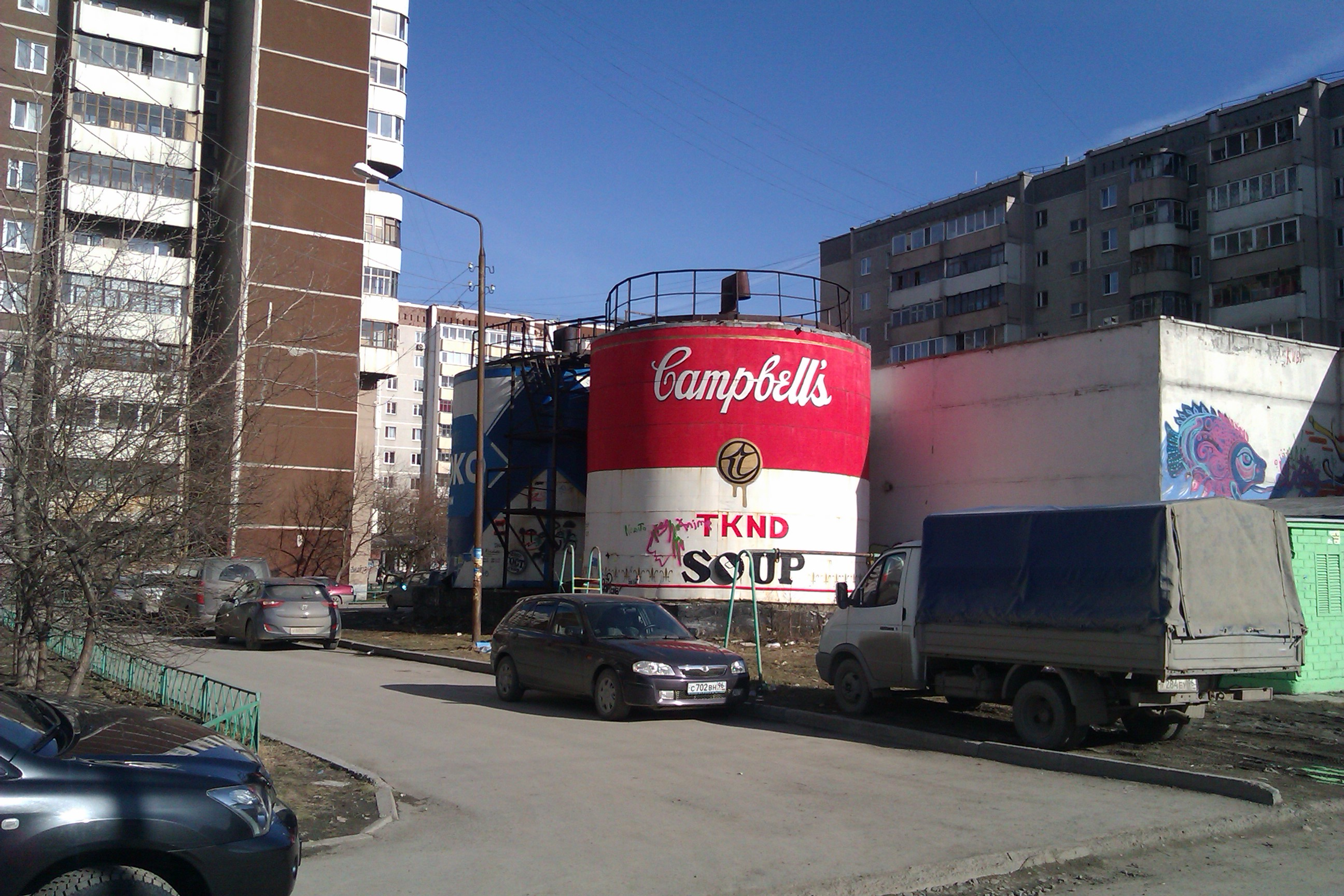
