= Loewensberg =

Loewensberg is a surname. Notable people with the surname include:

- Gret Loewensberg (born 1943), Swiss architect
- Verena Loewensberg (1912–1986), Swiss artist

== See also ==
- Loewenberg (disambiguation)
- Löwenberg
- Löwenburg (disambiguation)
