= Benjamin Booker (album) =

Studio album by Benjamin Booker
- Released: 9 August 2014
- Recorded: The Bomb Shelter, Nashville, December 2013
- Genres: Blues rock; garage rock; indie rock
- Length: 44:20
- Labels: ATO; Rough Trade
- Producer: Andrija Tokic

Benjamin Booker chronology
Benjamin Booker (2014)	Witness (2017)

Singles from Benjamin Booker
- 1. "Violent Shiver" Released: 8 April 2014

Benjamin Booker is the debut studio album by American musician Benjamin Booker. It was released on 9 August 2014 by ATO Records and Rough Trade Records.

== Recording and production ==
The album was recorded in December 2013 in engineer/producer Andrija Tokic's all-analog Bomb Shelter in East Nashville, Andrija Tokic who has produced recordings for Hurray for the Riff Raff and Alabama Shakes. The Bomb shelter was recommend to Booker as a place to record his album by Alynda Lee Segarra of Hurray for the Riff Raff and by Sam Doores of The Deslondes. Booker chose The Bomb Shelter as the place to record his album, as he wanted to record the album in analog like he stated in an interview: "

I wanted to do the record analog, not digital. So we went to The Bomb Shelter, a studio that is totally analog and where other bands from our label, Alabama Shakes and Hurray For The Riff Raff, recorded their album. I knew the guy there was good… and analog was important to me. If you want to put out an album on vinyl, you might as well do it right."

Booker arrived for the recording of the album with his only band mate, Max Norton, from Tampa, FL. The recording of the album was done using a RCA overhead on Norton’s kit, a Neumann U 87 on kick, and a Shure 57 on snare. Booker’s vocal chain usually included a Neumann U 67 with an Altec tube preamp and a UA 175 compressor, recording was often done with other instruments such as Sennheiser 441, in rotation to the main instruments used. the main guitars used for recording were 60s hollow-body Super Lynx Deluxe Vox, and an ’80s Ibanez Matsumoku Roadster. After recording started Tokic started bring in bass players and keyboardists to "flesh out recordings". The album was mixed on Tokic's MCI JH600 console.

== Reception ==
Professional ratings
Aggregate scores
Source	Rating
Metacritic	81/100
Review scores
Source	Rating
AllMusic	4/5 stars
American Songwriter	3/5 stars
Clash	7/10
DIY	8/10
The Guardian	4/5 stars
musicOMH	4/5 stars
NME	8/10
The Observer	3/5 stars
Rolling Stone	3.5/5 stars
Uncut	7/10

Upon its release Benjamin Booker's self-titled album Benjamin Booker received critical acclaim. At Metacritic, which assigns a normalized rating out of 100 to reviews from mainstream critics, the album received an average score of 81, based on 15 reviews, which indicates "universal acclaim".

== Track listing ==
All tracks are written by Benjamin Booker.

No.	Title	Length
1.	"Violent Shiver"	2:46
2.	"Always Waiting"	2:19
3.	"Chippewa"	3:14
4.	"Slow Coming"	4:31
5.	"Wicked Waters"	3:27
6.	"Have You Seen My Son?"	5:07
7.	"Spoon Out My Eyeballs"	3:03
8.	"Happy Homes"	4:34
9.	"I Thought I Heard You Screaming"	3:04
10.	"Old Hearts"	2:50
11.	"Kids Never Grow Older"	5:35
12.	"By the Evening"	3:50

== Personnel ==
Credits adapted from AllMusic.

- John Baldwin – mastering
- Benjamin Booker – bass, composer, guitar, primary artist, vocals
- Jem Cohen – bass, vocals (background)
- Eduardo Duquesne – bass, vocals (background)
- Mitch Jones – organ
- Rob Jones – design
- Peter Keys – Fender Rhodes, organ
- Max Norton – drums, organ, mandolin, photography
- Andrija Tokic – engineer, mixing, producer
- Ben Trimble – bass, mellotron

== Charts ==
Chart (2014)	Peak position
Belgian Albums Chart (Flanders)	187
Belgian Albums Chart (Wallonia)	59
Dutch Albums Chart	80
US Billboard 200	46
US Alternative Albums	10
US Rock Albums	15
Tastemaker Albums	10
Independent Albums	7
Top Album Sales	46
