= Loewenberg =

Loewenberg may refer to:

- Loewenberg, former name of Lwówek Śląski in Poland

== People with the name ==
- Deborah Loewenberg Ball, American mathematics education researcher
- Jacob Loewenberg (1882-1969), Latvian-American philosopher
- Peter Loewenberg (1933-), German professor of Politics

== See also ==
- Loewensberg
- Loewer
- Löwenberger Land, a municipality in the Oberhavel district, in the German state of Brandenburg
