= Lower (album) =

Studio album by Benjamin Booker
- Released: January 24, 2025
- Studio: The Ship; Kenny's house
- Length: 41:47
- Label: Fire Next Time; Thirty Tigers
- Producer: Benjamin Booker; Kenny Segal

Benjamin Booker chronology
Witness (2017)	Lower (2025)

Singles from Lower
- 1. "Lwa in the Trailer Park" Released: October 16, 2024; 2. "Same Kind of Lonely" Released: December 12, 2024

Lower is the third studio album by American singer-songwriter Benjamin Booker. It was released on January 24, 2025, by Fire Next Time Records and Thirty Tigers, and features the singles, "Lwa in the Trailer Park" and "Same Kind of Lonely". Co-produced with record producer Kenny Segal, it is Booker's debut release on Fire Next Time and his first coproduction effort among his solo projects.

== Background ==
Lower is Booker's first album in seven years, following his 2017 album Witness. It consists of eleven tracks ranging between two and six minutes each with a total runtime of approximately forty-two minutes. Incorporating elements of lo-fi, dream pop, ambient indie rock, noise pop, and hip-hop, it centers on themes such as alcoholism and homelessness. The album's first single, "Lwa in the Trailer Park", was released on October 16, 2024. The second single, "Same Kind of Lonely", was released on December 12, 2024, with a music video co-directed by Booker and Gerry Cisneros.

== Reception ==
Professional ratings
Review scores
Source	Rating
Clash	8/10 stars
Pitchfork	8.0/10
PopMatters	9/10 stars
Under the Radar	8/10 stars

Rachel Leong of Clash compared the album with Booker's self-titled ballad rock-influenced debut album, and his Americana and garage rock-inspired second album, Witness, stating that Lower is "certainly a culmination of the two." Clash rated the album eight out of ten, the same as Under the Radar, which noted in its review of the album, "Evidencing both a maturity and an ability to reign in the chaos when it's warranted, makes for an exciting listen from an artist at the height of their powers while also fully in control of them."

Pitchfork gave it a rating of 8.0 out of ten, remarking "it takes the basic textures of rap rock—boom bap beats, Deftones' icy ambiance, the corroded shredding of "She Watch Channel Zero?!"—and fashions them into a new strain of beat-centric grunge." John Lennon of PopMatters rated it nine out of ten and commented about how characters depicted by the album, "still grope along, putting on their "walking shoes" and taking steps in a world that cares nothing about them." The Wall Street Journal stated, "The blues-inflected musician's new album fuses well-wrought songs with the hiss and crackle of deliberately distorted production."

== Track listing ==
All tracks are written by Benjamin Evans and Kenny Segal; "Slow Dance in a Gay Bar" written with Michael Parvizi.

Lower track listing
No.	Title	Length
1.	"Black Opps"	3:48
2.	"Lwa in the Trailer Park"	2:46
3.	"Pompeii Statues"	3:53
4.	"Slow Dance in a Gay Bar"	4:10
5.	"Speaking with the Dead"	3:09
6.	"Rebecca Latimer Felton Takes a BBC"	3:04
7.	"New World"	4:05
8.	"Same Kind of Lonely"	5:24
9.	"Show and Tell"	2:40
10.	"Heavy on My Mind"	3:31
11.	"Hope for the Night Time"	5:17
Total length:		41:47

== Personnel ==
Credits adapted from the album's liner notes.

- Benjamin Booker – vocals, production, recording, photography
- Kenny Segal – production, recording, mixing
- Tim Horner – recording
- Brian Rosemeyer – recording
- Mike Parvizi – bass (1, 5); guitar, Rhodes (4)
- Mekala Session – percussion (1, 11), drums (3, 6)
- Jason Wool – piano (2, 3)
- Cameron Stone – cello (5–7)
- Aaron Carmack – Rhodes (6)
- Ryan Crosby – bass (10, 11), guitar (11)
- Oliver Hill – bass, synthesizer, piano (11)
- Daddy Kev – mastering
- Pollen Arts Club – design
