= Please Don't Be Dead =

Studio album by Fantastic Negrito
- Released: June 22, 2018
- Genre: Blues rock
- Length: 38:34
- Labels: Cooking Vinyl; Blackball Universe
- Producer: Fantastic Negrito

Fantastic Negrito chronology
The Last Days of Oakland (2016)	Please Don't Be Dead (2018)	Have You Lost Your Mind Yet? (2020)

Please Don't Be Dead is the third studio album by American singer-songwriter Fantastic Negrito. The album was released on June 15, 2018. The album won a Grammy Award for Best Contemporary Blues Album at the 61st Grammy Awards.

== Critical reception ==
Professional ratings
Aggregate scores
Source	Rating
Metacritic	75/100
Review scores
Source	Rating
AllMusic	3.5/5 stars
Exclaim!	9/10
Paste	7.5/10

The album received a Metacritic score of 75 based on 7 critics, indicating generally favorable reviews.

== Track listing ==
No.	Title	Length
1.	"Plastic Hamburgers"	3:37
2.	"Bad Guy Necessity"	3:58
3.	"A Letter to Fear"	4:04
4.	"A Boy Named Andrew"	4:22
5.	"Transgender Biscuits"	3:02
6.	"The Suit That Won't Come Off"	4:00
7.	"A Cold November Street"	3:51
8.	"The Duffler"	3:39
9.	"Dark Windows"	3:40
10.	"Never Give Up"	1:06
11.	"Bullshit Anthem"	3:15
Total length:		38:34

== Charts ==
Chart performance for Please Don't Be Dead
Chart (2018)	Peak position
US Heatseekers Albums (Billboard)	15
US Top Blues Albums (Billboard)	3
