= Nizhny =

Nizhny (Russian: Ни́жний; masculine), Nizhnyaya (Ни́жняя; feminine), or Nizhneye (Russian: Ни́жнее; neuter), literally meaning "lower", is the name of several Russian localities. It may refer to:

- Nizhny Novgorod, a Russian city colloquially referred to as "Nizhny"
- Nizhny, Republic of Bashkortostan, a khutor in Chishminsky District of the Republic of Bashkortostan
- Nizhny, Samara Oblast, a settlement in Isaklinsky District of Samara Oblast
- Nizhny Tagil, a Russian city in Sverdlovsk Oblast
- Nizhnyaya, Kirov Oblast, a village in Pizhansky District of Kirov Oblast
- Nizhnyaya, Leningrad Oblast, a village in Gatchinsky District of Leningrad Oblast
- Nizhnyaya, Perm Krai, a village in Alexandrovsky District of Perm Krai
- Nizhneye, Bryansk Oblast, a selo in Starodubsky District of Bryansk Oblast
- Nizhneye, Kaluga Oblast, a selo in Zhukovsky District of Kaluga Oblast
