= Have You Lost Your Mind Yet? =

Studio album by Fantastic Negrito
- Released: August 14, 2020
- Genre: Blues
- Length: 38:22
- Label: Cooking Vinyl
- Producer: Xavier Amin Dphrepaulezz

Fantastic Negrito chronology
| Please Don't Be Dead (2018) | Have You Lost Your Mind Yet? (2020) | White Jesus Black Problems (2022) |

Professional ratings
Aggregate scores
| Source | Rating |
|---|---|
| Metacritic | 77/100 |
Review scores
| Source | Rating |
| AllMusic | 3.5/5 stars |
| American Songwriter | 4/5 stars |
| Classic Rock | 3.5/5 stars |
| musicOMH | 4/5 stars |

Have You Lost Your Mind Yet? is the fourth studio album by Fantastic Negrito, released through Cooking Vinyl on August 14, 2020. The album won the Grammy Award for Best Contemporary Blues Album.

== Critical reception ==
Have You Lost Your Mind Yet? received a score of 77 out of 100 based on eight reviews at review aggregator Metacritic, indicating "generally favorable" reception.

== Track listing ==
Have You Lost Your Mind Yet? track listing
| No. | Title | Length |
|---|---|---|
| 1. | "Chocolate Samurai" | 4:55 |
| 2. | "I'm So Happy I Cry" (featuring Tank and the Bangas and Tarriona "Tank" Ball) | 3:24 |
| 3. | "How Long?" | 4:16 |
| 4. | "Shigamabu Blues" | 0:55 |
| 5. | "Searching for Captain Save a Hoe" (featuring E-40) | 3:45 |
| 6. | "Your Sex Is Overrated" (featuring Masa Kohama) | 4:56 |
| 7. | "These Are My Friends" | 3:44 |
| 8. | "All Up in My Space" | 4:32 |
| 9. | "Justice in America" | 0:29 |
| 10. | "King Frustration" | 4:19 |
| 11. | "Platypus Dipster" | 3:07 |
| Total length: | | 38:22 |

== Charts ==
Chart performance for Have You Lost Your Mind Yet?
| Chart (2020) | Peak position |
|---|---|
| US Top Blues Albums (Billboard) | 1 |
| US Top Current Album Sales (Billboard) | 66 |
