= Lower (surname) =

Lower is a surname. Notable people with the surname include:

- Arthur R. M. Lower (1889–1988), Canadian historian
- Britt Lower (born 1985), American actress
- Cyrus B. Lower (1843–1924), American Civil War Medal of Honor recipient
- Geoffrey Lower (born 1963), American actor
- Kathleen Lower (1905-1995), British politician
- Oswald Bertram Lower (1863–1925), Australian entomologist
- Richard Lower (physician) (1631–1691), Cornish inventor of blood transfusion
- Robert A. Lower (1844–1918), American Civil War Medal of Honor recipient
- William Lower (astronomer) (1570–1615), English astronomer
- William Lower (dramatist) (c. 1610–1662), English dramatist and translator
