= Robert A. Lower =

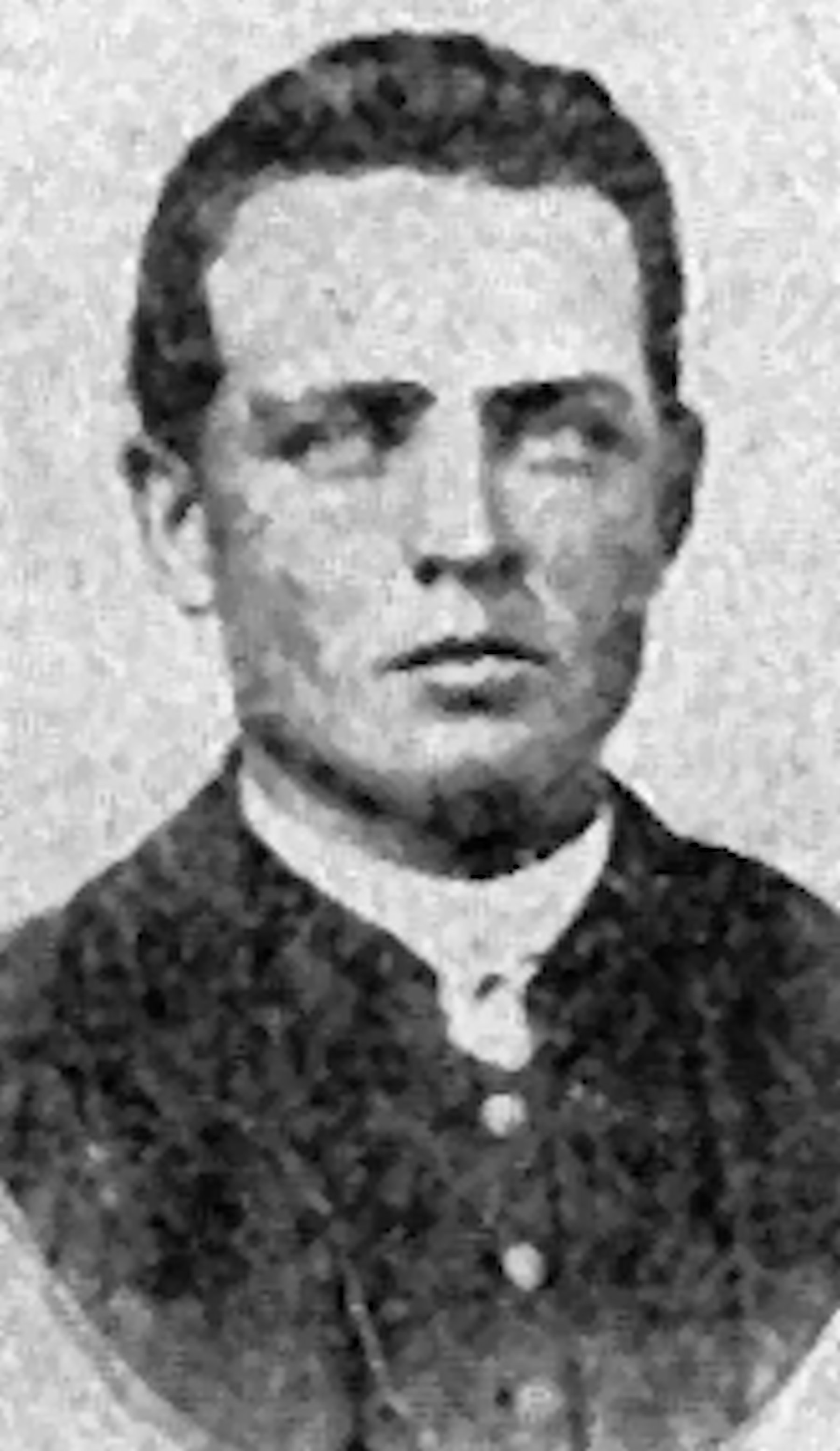
- Born: April 11, 1844; Mattoon, Illinois
- Died: January 31, 1918 (aged 73); Yates City, Illinois
- Burial place: Yates City, Illinois
- Military career
- Allegiance: United States of America; Union
- Branch: United States Army; Union Army
- Service years: 1861–1864
- Rank: Private
- Units: Company K, 55th Illinois Volunteer Infantry
- Conflicts: American Civil War
- Awards: Medal of Honor

Robert Alison Lower (April 11, 1844 – January 31, 1918) was a private in the Union Army and a Medal of Honor recipient for his actions in the American Civil War.

Lower joined the 55th Illinois Infantry in October 1861, and was mustered out in October 1864.

== Medal of Honor citation ==
Rank and organization. Private, Company K, 55th Illinois Infantry. Place and date: At Vicksburg, Miss., May 22, 1863. Entered service at: Elmwood, Ill. Birth: Illinois. Date of issue: September 2, 1893.

Citation:

Gallantry in the charge of the "volunteer storming party."

== See also ==
- List of Medal of Honor recipients
- List of American Civil War Medal of Honor recipients: G–L
