= Benjamin Booker =

American musician (born 1989)

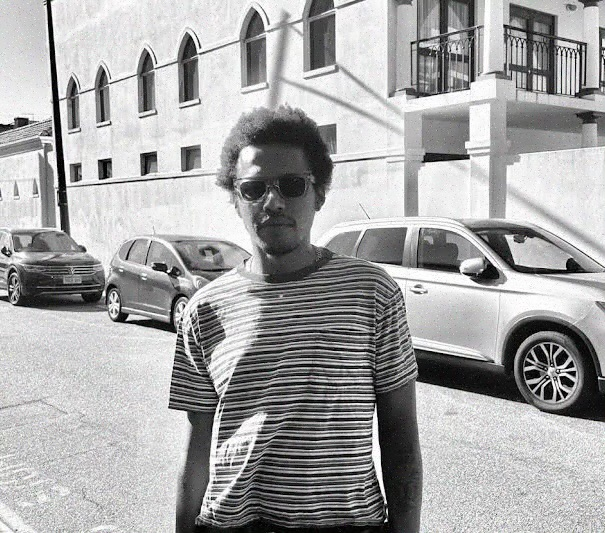
- Benjamin Booker in New Orleans, LA (9 October 2024)

Background information
- Born: Benjamin Roderick Evans; June 14, 1989 (age 37); Virginia Beach, Virginia, United States
- Genres: Blues rock; garage rock; punk blues; noise pop; dream pop; art pop
- Occupations: singer; songwriter; guitarist
- Instruments: Vocals; guitar
- Years active: 2012–present
- Labels: ATO; Rough Trade; Fire Next Time
- Website: benjamin-booker.com

Benjamin Booker (born Benjamin Roderick Evans on June 14, 1989) is an American singer, songwriter and guitarist. He cites the Gun Club, Blind Willie Johnson and T. Rex as influences. His music was described by the Chicago Tribune as "a raw brand of blues/boogie/soul", by The Independent as "frenzied guitar-strumming and raw, soulful vocals that are hair-raising in intensity", and by Spin as "bright, furious, explosive garage rock."

== Early life ==
Benjamin Booker was born in Virginia Beach, Virginia. His family relocated to Tampa, Florida, where he attended all-ages DIY punk shows as a teenager. He attended Orange Grove Middle School, a magnet school for the performing arts, followed by Hillsborough High School, where he studied in the International Baccalaureate Program. He then attended the University of Florida, Gainesville, studying journalism with intentions of going into music journalism. After college, he moved to New Orleans to work for a non-profit organization and began playing shows. He self-released the four-track EP Waiting Ones in 2012, a collection of "low-fi blues-influenced folk-punk recordings and handclap percussion" that gained the attention of music blog Aquarium Drunkard. The track "Have You Seen My Son" eventually landed on Sirius XM satellite radio. In 2013, he began touring as an electric duo and signed with ATO Records to produce his debut album.

== Career ==
=== 2013–2016: Benjamin Booker ===
Booker's self-titled debut album was recorded in December 2013 at The Bomb Shelter, an analog studio in Nashville. Produced by Andrija Tokic (Alabama Shakes, Hurray for the Riff Raff), the album was released on August 19, 2014, via ATO Records in the United States and Rough Trade Records in Europe. The first single from the album, "Violent Shiver", was released in April 2014. The album received early praise, debuting in the top 10 of Billboard's Alternative Albums and Independent Albums charts and leading to Benjamin Booker being named an "artist you need to know" by Rolling Stone, "the best of what's next" by Paste and a "contender for rock record of the year" by Spin. Benjamin Booker also performed on late night television programs Late Night with David Letterman, Conan and Later With Jools Holland.

Since release, in addition to touring with Jack White and Courtney Barnett, Booker, accompanied by drummer Max Norton and bassist Alex Spoto, has played international headlining tours and performed at a number of festivals. In 2013, he performed at FYF Fest, the Newport Folk Festival, the Austin City Limits Music Festival, Voodoo Experience and Lollapalooza, where Rolling Stone named his performance the festival's "best rock star moment... best experienced live and turned up to 11". Internationally, he has appeared on the lineups of France's Festival Les InRocks Philips and Australia's St Jerome's Laneway Festival.

=== 2017: Witness ===
Booker's second album Witness was released on June 2, 2017. The album was announced with the premiere of its title track "Witness" (featuring Mavis Staples) alongside an essay written by Booker which detailed the experience that led him towards writing the album's title track. The song "Witness" was called "a piano-pounding hymn for Black Lives Matter" by The New York Times. The title track's references to police brutality and activism garnered Booker coverage in politically leaning outlets including Mic, which noted the album's "urgent synthesis of blues, gospel and soul — forms with long histories of translating black pain into uplifting and enduring compositions ... with a raw and unforgiving candor that's reminiscent of downtown New York punk." The opening track "Right on You" was shared on April 19 by The Fader which called it "a staticky, high-tempo ballad that packs a punch". The third song to be released from the album, "Believe", was premiered by Time magazine on May 23. Since the album's release on June 2, 2017, WNYC has described Booker as "a punk & grit-infused songwriter whose ecstatic and soulful sounds channel vintage soul-rock, gospel, and blues." On June 19, "Witness" was shared by Pitchfork alongside a review saying Benjamin "makes retro music feel modern, reflecting on racism in America while drawing on blues, soul, and gospel."

Following the tours to support Witness, Booker was relatively quiet for the remainder of the decade. In September 2020, he released the single "Black Disco" with proceeds going to the Southern Poverty Law Center. In 2023, he was featured on "Baby Steps" by Billy Woods and Kenny Segal, on their collabrative album Maps. On February 27, 2024, he appeared on Armand Hammer's We Buy Diabetic Test Strips on the track "Doves", a bonus track.

=== 2024–2025: Lower ===
Towards the end of 2024, Booker started teasing a new album called Lower after releasing a single called "LWA in the Trailer Park", along with a music video for the track on October 16, which gave a pre-save link for his album set to release on January 24, 2025. On the December 11, 2024, Booker released two more tracks for his upcoming album: "Show and Tell" and "Same Kind of Lonely". "Same Kind of Lonely" also came with a music video released the same day. On January 14, 2025, Booker released "Slow Dance in a Gay Bar" as the final teaser single, as well as a music video for the track uploaded the same date.

On January 24, 2025, Booker released Lower, almost 8 years after the release of his last album Witness. The album contains 11 tracks and a runtime of 41 minutes, mixing a range of genres such as art rock, neo soul, psychedelia, with a mix of lo-fi and experimental instrumentals. The album also contains shared production from Kenny Segal, who Booker has worked with closely in the past. The album also came with the release of physical copies, with CDs and vinyls purchasable.

The release of the album was well received critically, gaining an average critic score of 80.

== Discography ==
=== Studio albums ===
- Benjamin Booker (2014)
- Witness (2017)
- Lower (2025)

=== Live albums ===
- Live at Third Man Records (2015 – exclusively on vinyl)

=== EPs ===
- Waiting Ones (2012)
- Spotify Sessions (2014 – Digital exclusive via Spotify)

=== Singles ===
- "Violent Shiver" (2014)
- "Witness" (2017)
- "Black Disco" (2020)
