= Fantastic Negrito =

American singer-songwriter

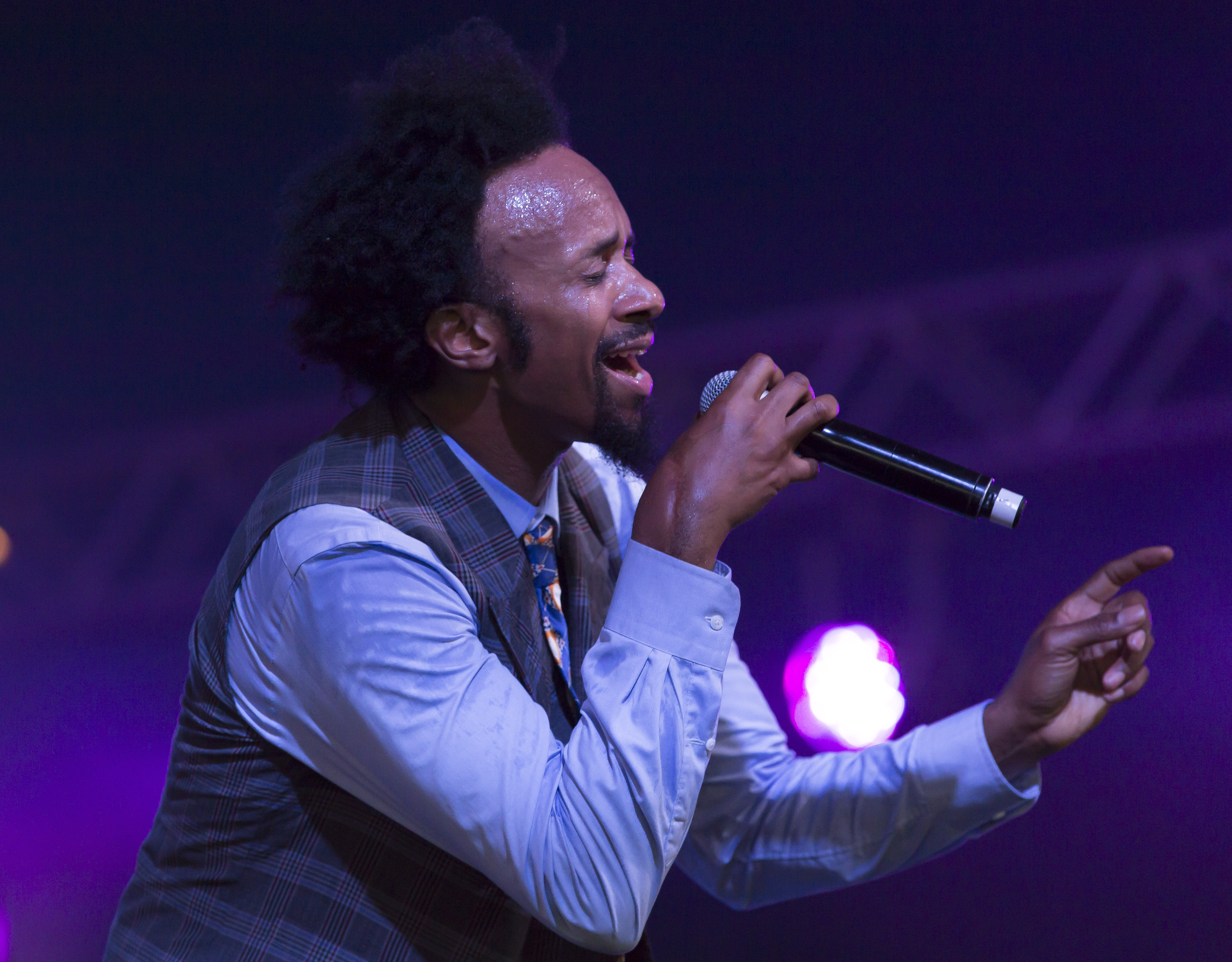
- Fantastic Negrito at Byron Bay Bluesfest, Australia, 2016

Background information
- Born: Xavier Amin Dphrepaulezz; January 20, 1968 (age 58); Great Barrington, Massachusetts
- Origin: Oakland, California
- Genres: Folk; blues; R&B
- Instruments: Guitar, vocals
- Years active: 1996–2007, 2014–present
- Labels: Interscope (1996–1999); Blackball Universe; Storefront Records; Cooking Vinyl
- Website: fantasticnegrito.com

Xavier Amin Dphrepaulezz (born January 20, 1968), better known by his stage name Fantastic Negrito, is an American singer-songwriter whose music spans blues, R&B, and roots music. His 2016 album The Last Days of Oakland won a Grammy award for Best Contemporary Blues Album at the 59th Grammy Awards. In 2019, his album Please Don't Be Dead won the same category for the 61st Grammy Awards. His 2020 album, Have You Lost Your Mind Yet? won Fantastic Negrito his third consecutive Best Contemporary Blues Album Grammy at the 63rd Annual Grammy Awards. His most recent album, Son of a Broken Man, was released in 2024.

== Early life ==
Dphrepaulezz was born in western Massachusetts, the eighth of fifteen children. His Somali-Bahamian father was a deeply religious Muslim who, Dphrepaulezz recalls, had "a lot of rules" for his children. Dphrepaulezz and his family relocated to Oakland, California, when he was 12 years old. He began selling drugs as a teenager in Oakland, telling the Guardian, "We were all selling drugs, man. We all carried pistols. There was a crack epidemic. [....] I was the kind of kid who would sell fake weed [...]. Sometimes I would use tea." He became inspired to teach himself how to play music after listening to Prince's album Dirty Mind and hearing that Prince was a self-taught musician. He learned to play music by sneaking into music classrooms at the University of California Berkeley despite not being a student there.

== Career ==
Dphrepaulezz signed an early record deal with Prince's former manager. In 1993, he signed with Interscope Records. On January 9, 1996, he released his first album, The X Factor, under the mononym Xavier. The album was released on Lexington House Records and distributed by Interscope. He was in a near-fatal car crash in 1999, which left him in a coma for three weeks. He has said that he felt that this crash "released" him because Interscope terminated their contract with him, after which he set up an illegal nightclub in South Central Los Angeles.

He revived his career in 2014, adopting the name Fantastic Negrito and developing a style that he calls "black roots music for everyone". He released a self-titled album under that name in 2014. In 2015, he won NPR's Tiny Desk Contest. In 2016, his album The Last Days of Oakland was released on the Blackball Universe label. Dphrepaulezz won his first Grammy in 2017, when The Last Days of Oakland received the Grammy Award for Best Contemporary Blues Album.

Dphrepaulezz won his second Grammy with his next album, Please Don't Be Dead, which won another Best Contemporary Blues Album award at the 2019 Grammy Awards. His third Grammy in that category was awarded in 2021 for his album Have You Lost Your Mind Yet? His fifth album as Fantastic Negrito, White Jesus Black Problems, was released in 2022. An acoustic reworking of that album titled Grandfather Courage was released in 2023. The album Son of a Broken Man, informed by Fantastic Negrito's relationship with his father, was released in October 2024.

== Discography ==
- The X Factor (Interscope, 1996) (as Xavier)
- Fantastic Negrito (Blackball Universe, 2014)
- The Last Days of Oakland (Blackball Universe, 2016)
- Please Don't Be Dead (Cooking Vinyl, Blackball Universe, 2018)
- Have You Lost Your Mind Yet? (Cooking Vinyl, 2020)
- White Jesus Black Problems (Storefront Records, 2022)
- Grandfather Courage (Storefront Records, 2023)
- Son of a Broken Man (Storefront Records, 2024)
