= Nizhny, Republic of Bashkortostan =

Nizhny Нижний
- Khutor
- Location within Bashkortostan Location within Russia
- Coordinates: 54°25′N 55°05′E
- Country: Russia
- Region: Bashkortostan
- District: Chishminsky District
- Time zone: UTC+5:00

Nizhny (Russian: Нижний; Bashkir: Түбәнге, Tübänge) is a rural locality (a khutor) in Shingak-Kulsky Selsoviet, Chishminsky District, Bashkortostan, Russia. The rural locality has 2 streets and, as of 2010, a population of 188.

== Geography ==
Nizhny is located 36 km southwest of Chishmy, the district's administrative centre. Yekaterinoslavka is the nearest rural locality.
