= Blackball Universe =

Multimedia collective in Oakland, California

Blackball Universe is an Oakland, California-based multimedia collective founded by Fantastic Negrito and Malcolm Spellman to serve as support for struggling black artists. It was originally just a record label, but it has since expanded to be a multimedia collective, including writers, artists, directors, and editors in addition to musicians. As of 2014, its offices include an art gallery, a recording studio, and a rehearsal space. It is based in an undistinguished office in the Jack London District, a warehouse district in Oakland.
