= Löwenberger Land =

- Municipality
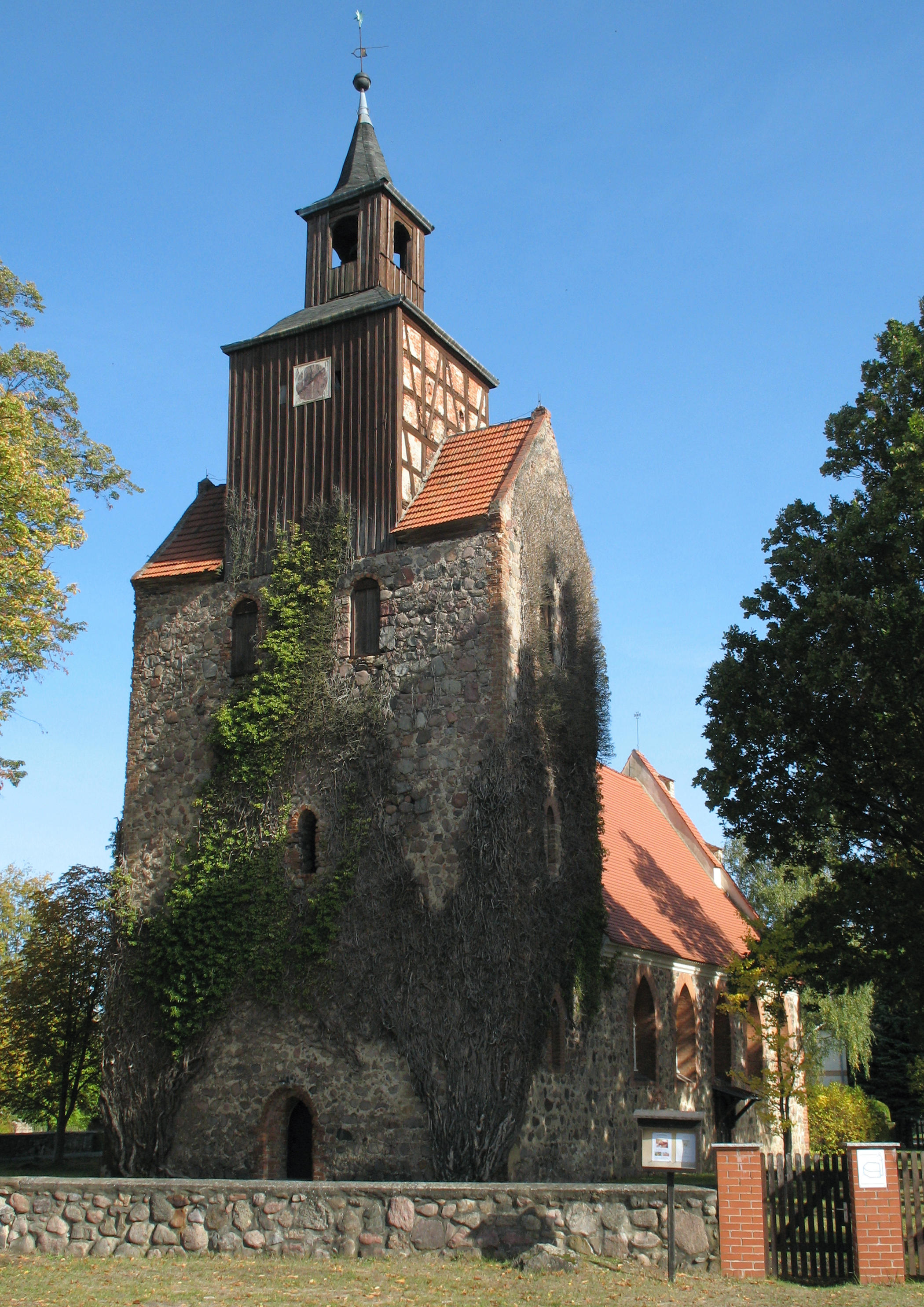
- Church in Falkenthal

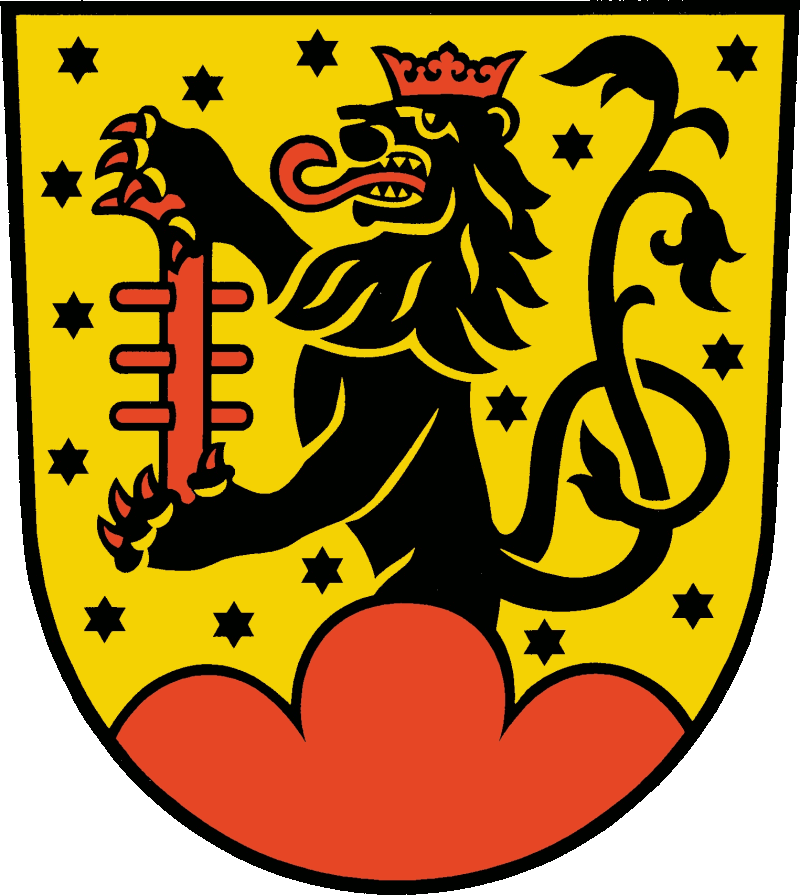
- Coat of arms

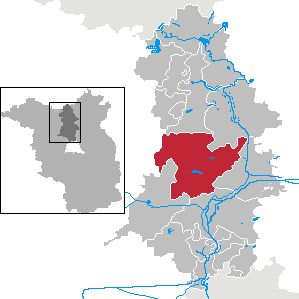
- Location of Löwenberger Land within Oberhavel district
- Interactive map of Löwenberger Land
- Location within Germany Location within Brandenburg
- Coordinates: 52°53′N 13°09′E
- Country: Germany
- State: Brandenburg
- District: Oberhavel
- Subdivisions: 15 districts

Government
  - Mayor (2022–30): Pieter Schneider

Area
  - Total: 244.83 km^{2} (94.53 sq mi)
- Elevation: 51 m (167 ft)

Population (2025-12-31)
  - Total: 8,482
  - Density: 34.64/km^{2} (89.73/sq mi)
- Time zone: UTC+01:00 (CET)
  - Summer (DST): UTC+02:00 (CEST)
- Postal codes: 16775
- Vehicle registration: OHV
- Website: loewenberger-land.de

Löwenberger Land is a municipality in the Oberhavel district, in the German state of Brandenburg, about 50 km north of Berlin.

== Overview ==
Established on 31 December 1997, it consists of 15 villages:

- Falkenthal
- Glambeck
- Grieben
- Großmutz
- Grüneberg
- Gutengermendorf
- Häsen
- Hoppenrade
- Liebenberg
- Linde
- Löwenberg
- Nassenheide (since 2003)
- Neuendorf (since 2002)
- Neulöwenberg
- Teschendorf

Löwenberg was first mentioned in a 1269 deed, when it was acquired by the Bishopric of Brandenburg from the Brandenburg Margraves. A Gothic fieldstone church was erected in the 13th century. The church and large parts of the village were devastated by a fire in 1808. In 1877 Löwenberg gained access to the new Prussian Nordbahn railway line from Berlin to Neubrandenburg.

The municipality is known for Liebenberg Castle (Schloss Liebenberg) built in 1745, the former residence of Philipp, Prince of Eulenburg (1847–1921) who from 1886 on held a homophile political salon - the Liebenberg Circle - here. Members included the Berlin military commander Kuno von Moltke, the later Chancellor Bernhard von Bülow and Emperor Wilhelm II. The circle broke up in 1907 with the Harden-Eulenburg Affair.

== Transportation ==
Löwenberg is situated at the junction of the Bundesstraßen 96 and 167. The Löwenberg railway station is served by the Nordbahn line from Berlin to Stralsund. In east-west direction train connections are also available toward Prenzlau and Rheinsberg. Further Nordbahn railway stations are also in the villages of Grüneberg and Nassenheide.

== Notable people ==
- Libertas Schulze-Boysen, Resistance fighter, born 20 November 1913 in Paris, died 22 December 1942 in Berlin Plötzensee Prison, granddaughter of Philipp zu Eulenburg, spent her childhood at Liebenberg Castle.

== Some historical sites ==
Some buildings and scenes from the region

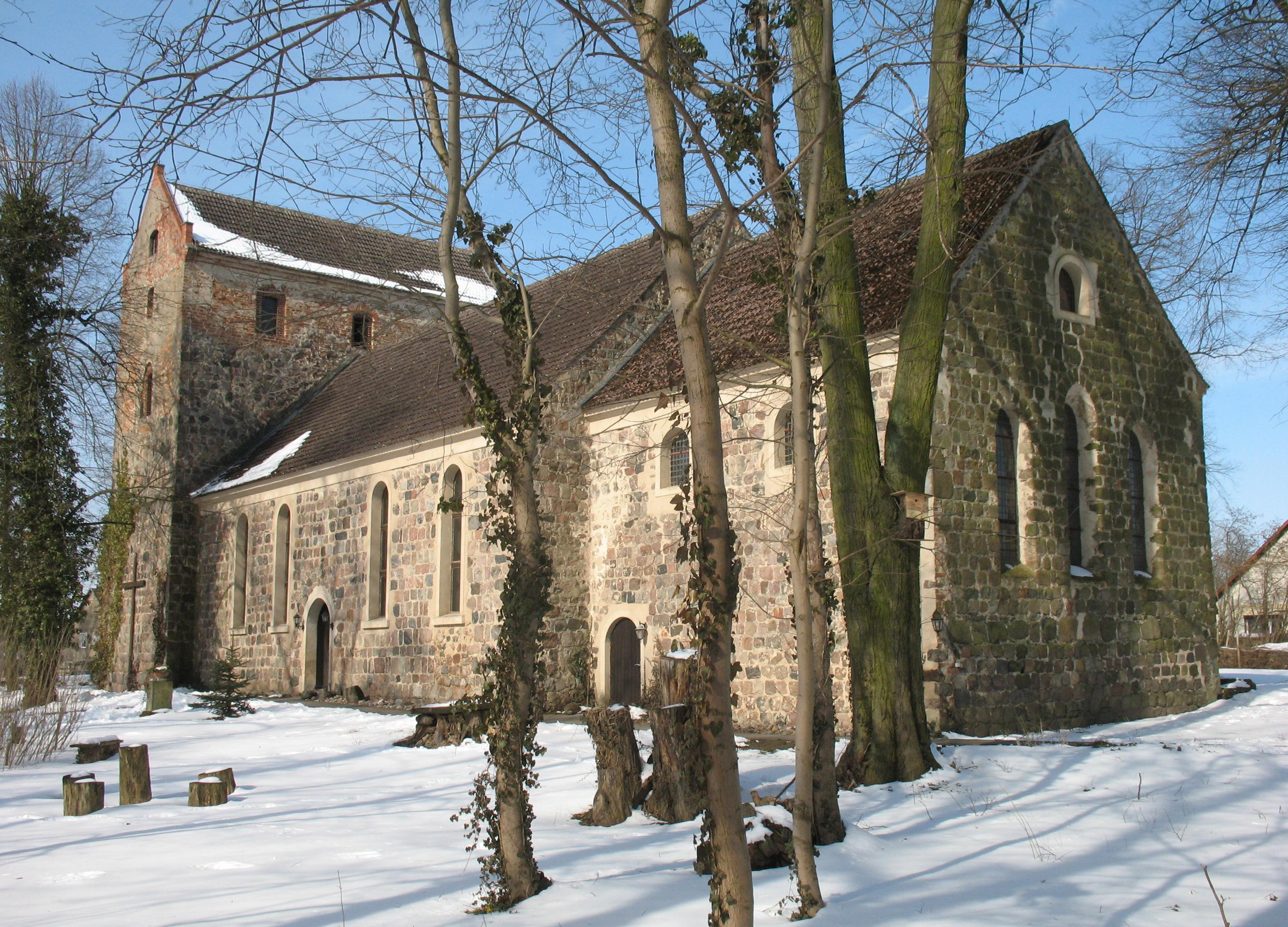
Church in Löwenberg

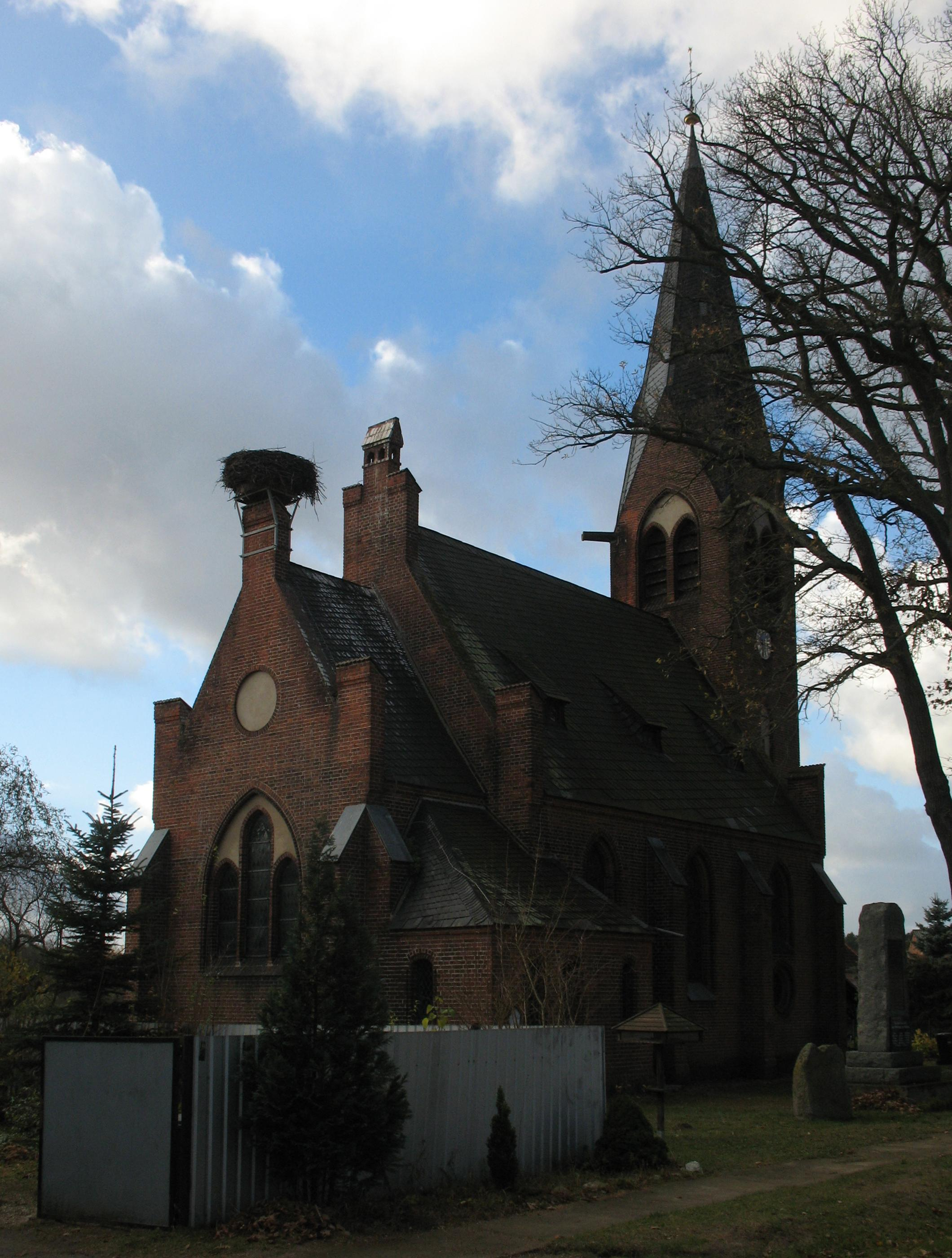
Church in Glambeck

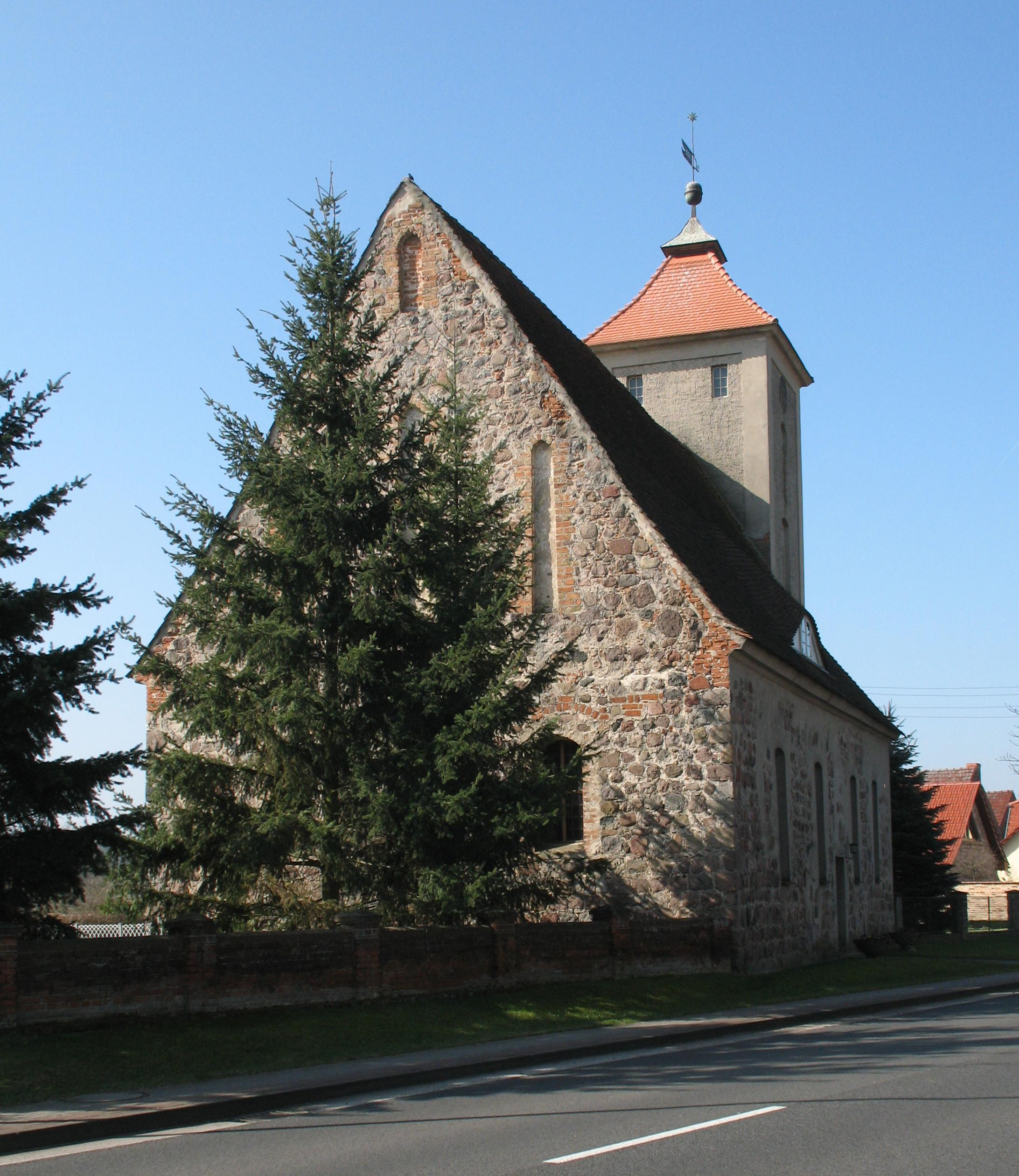
Church in Grieben

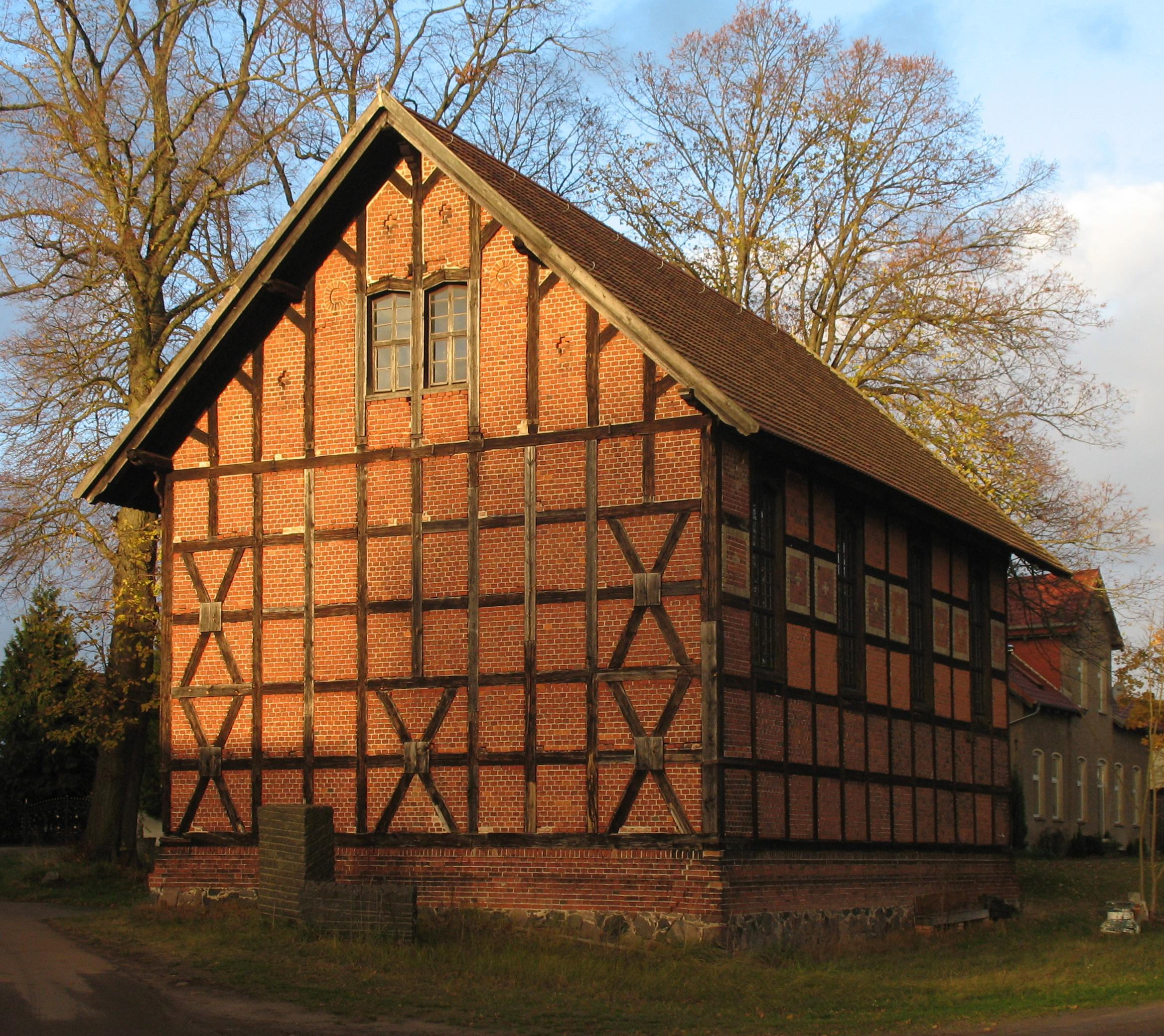
Church in Linde

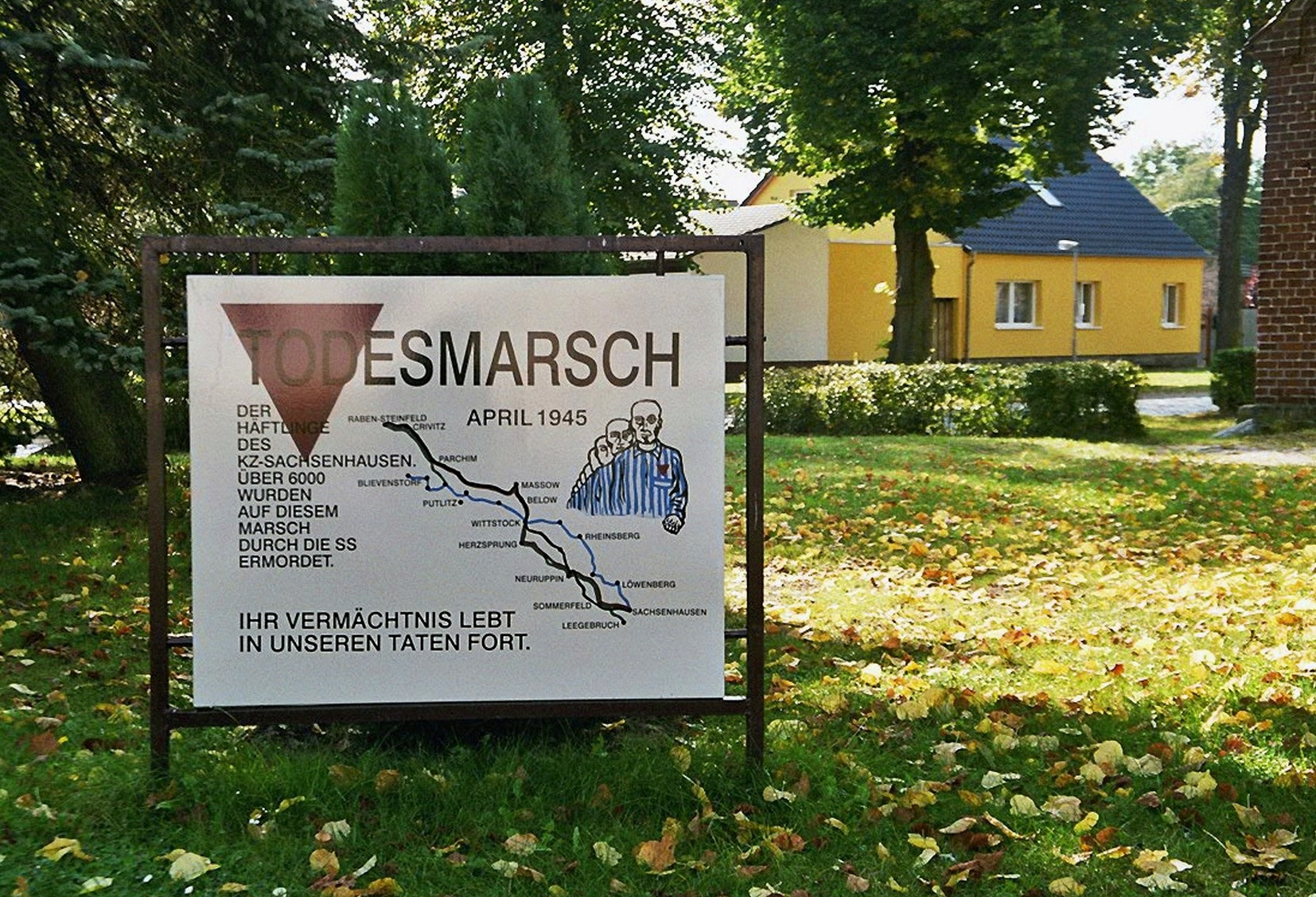
Sachsenhausen Todesmarsch (death march) route marker

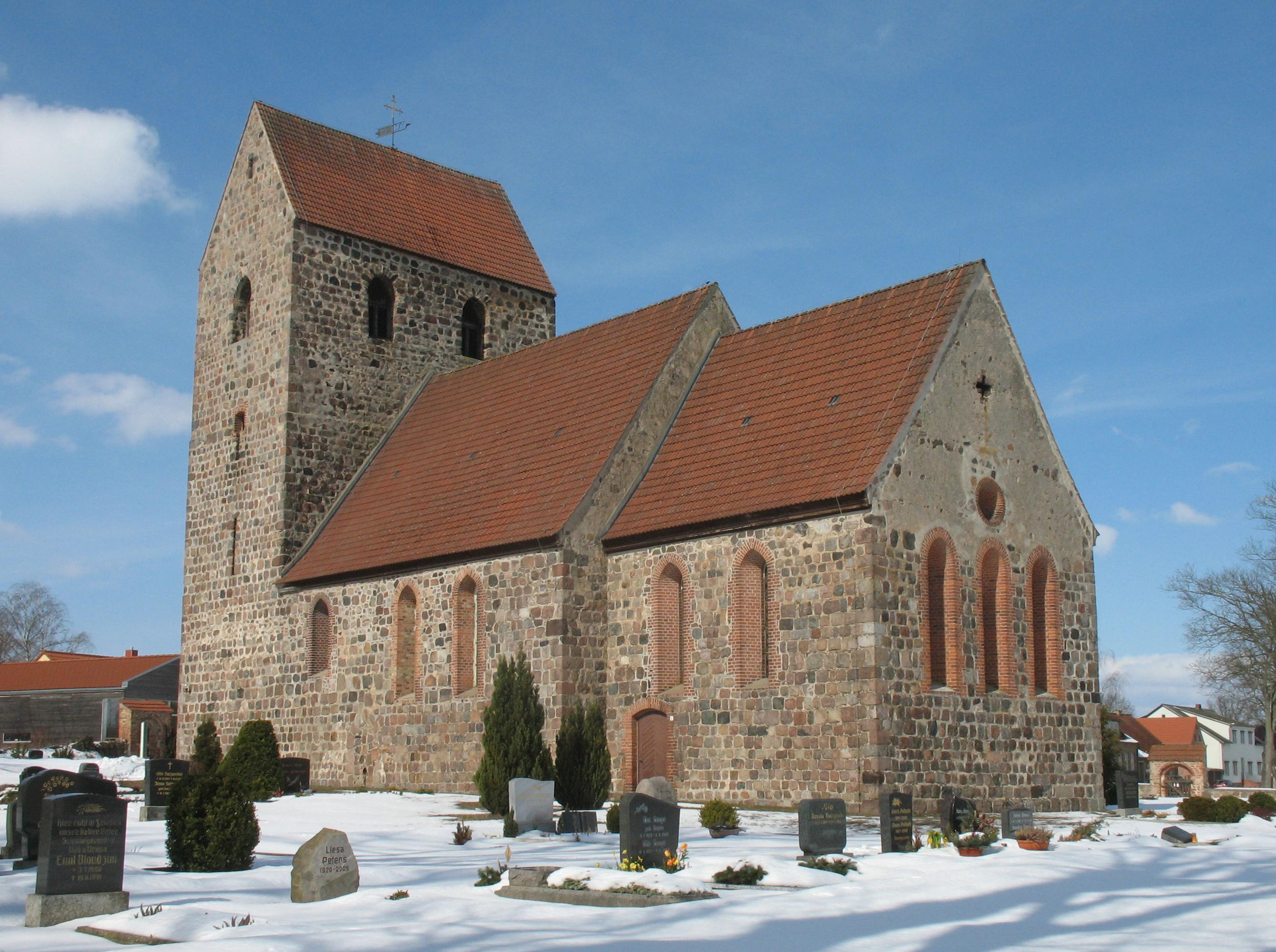
Church in Gutengermendorf

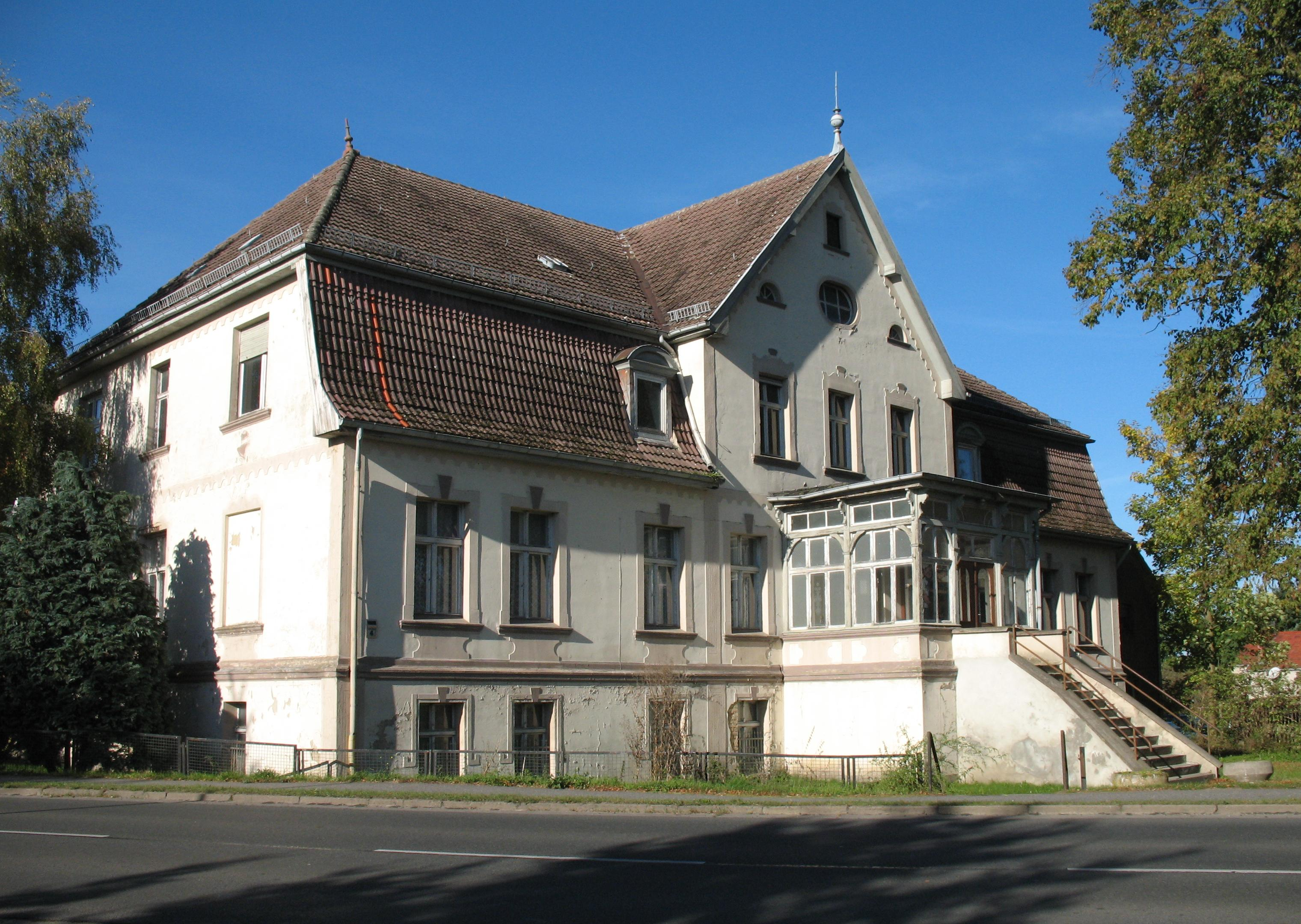
Building in Löwenberg

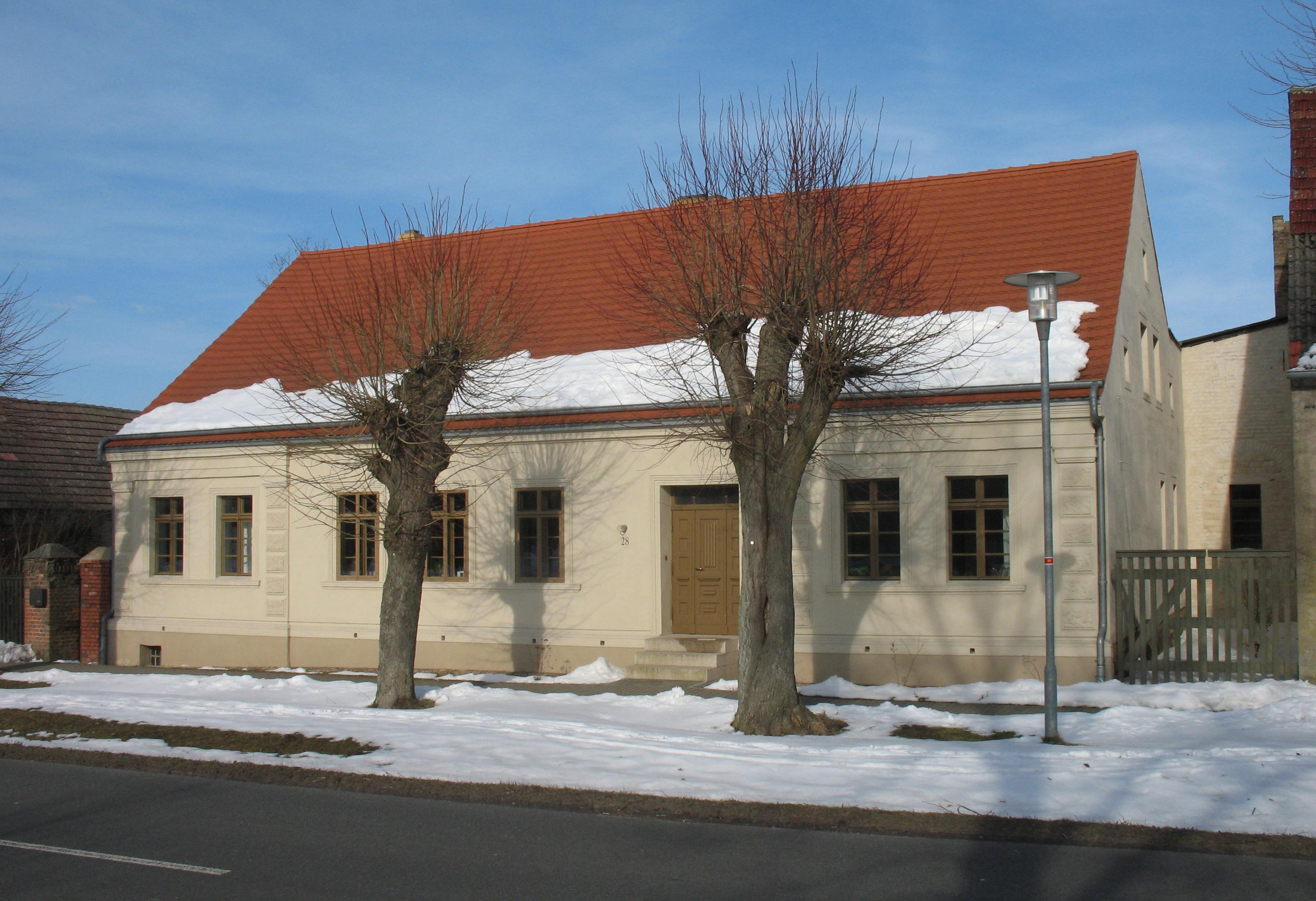
Former tavern in Gutengermendorf

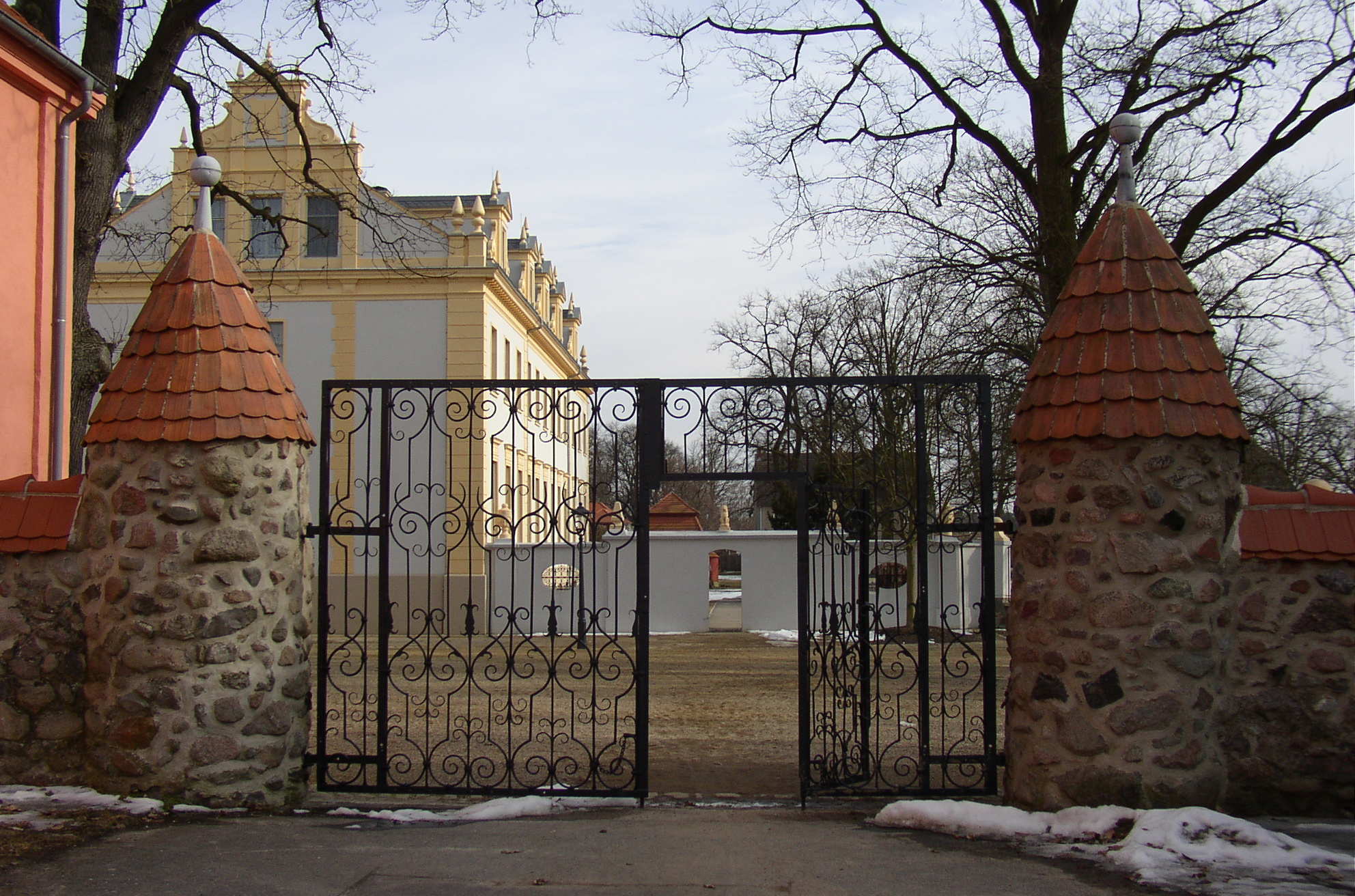
Liebenberg Castle

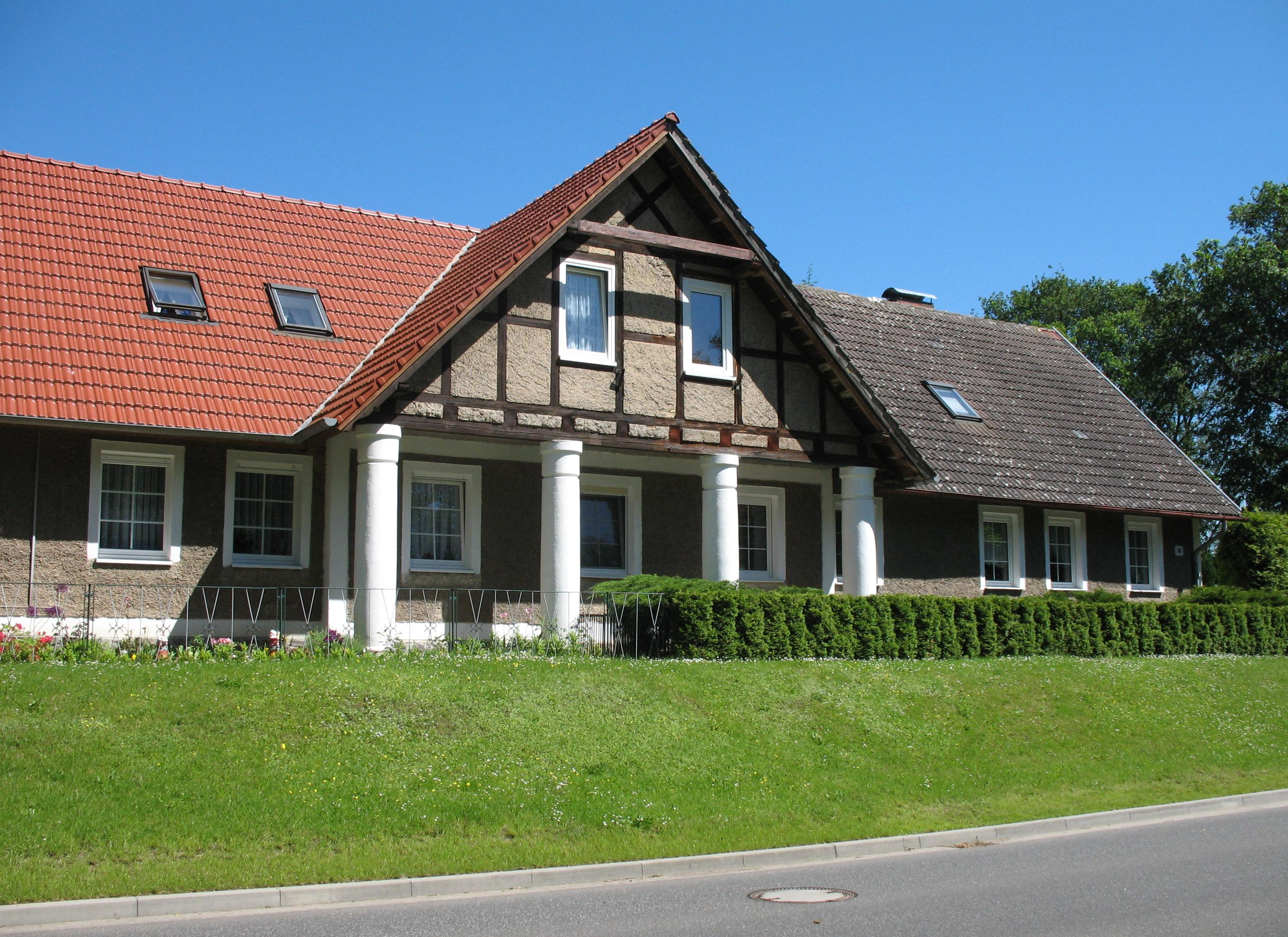
Alcove house in Liebenberg

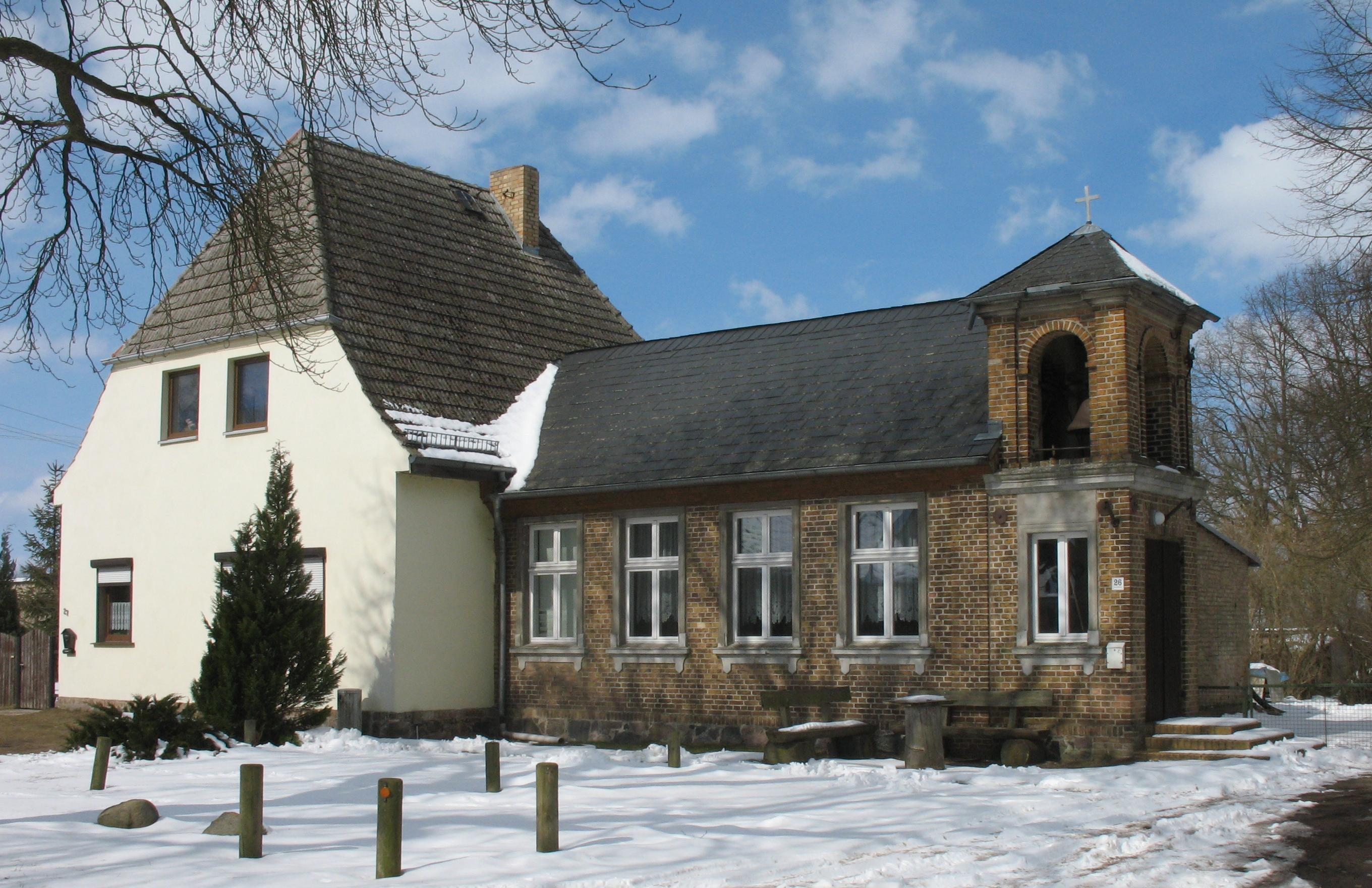
Former schoolhouse in Klevesche Häuser

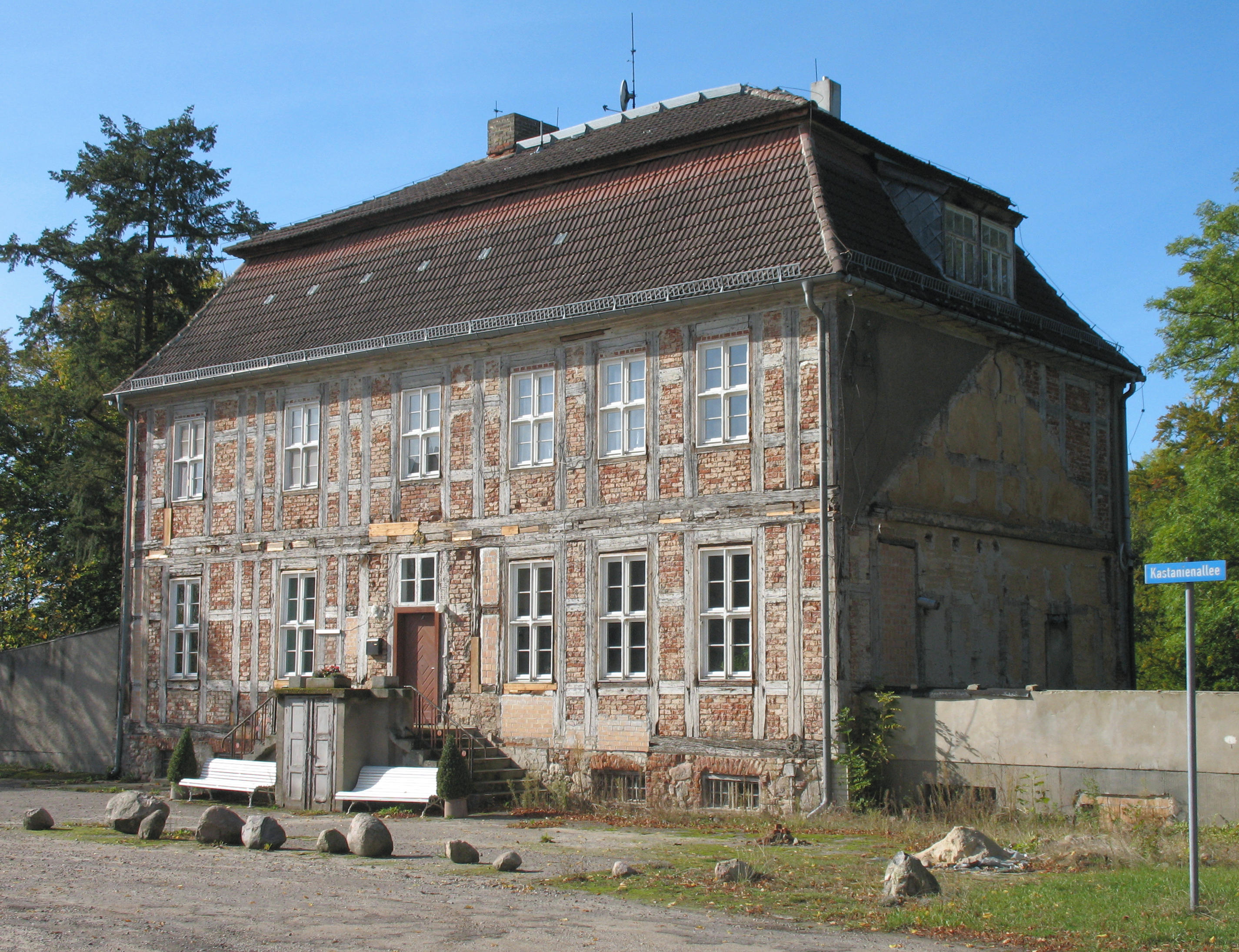
Manor

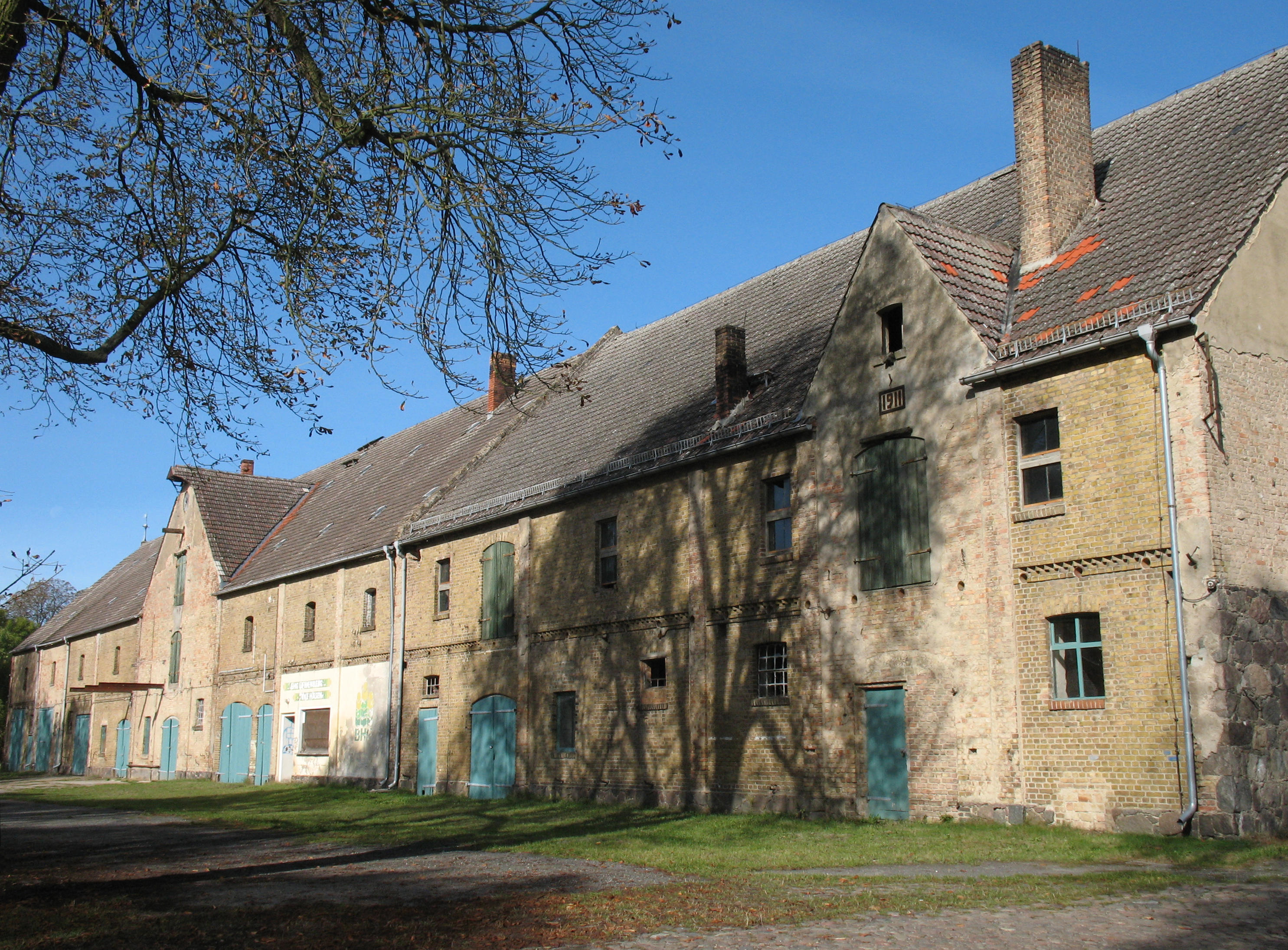
Estate

== Demography ==
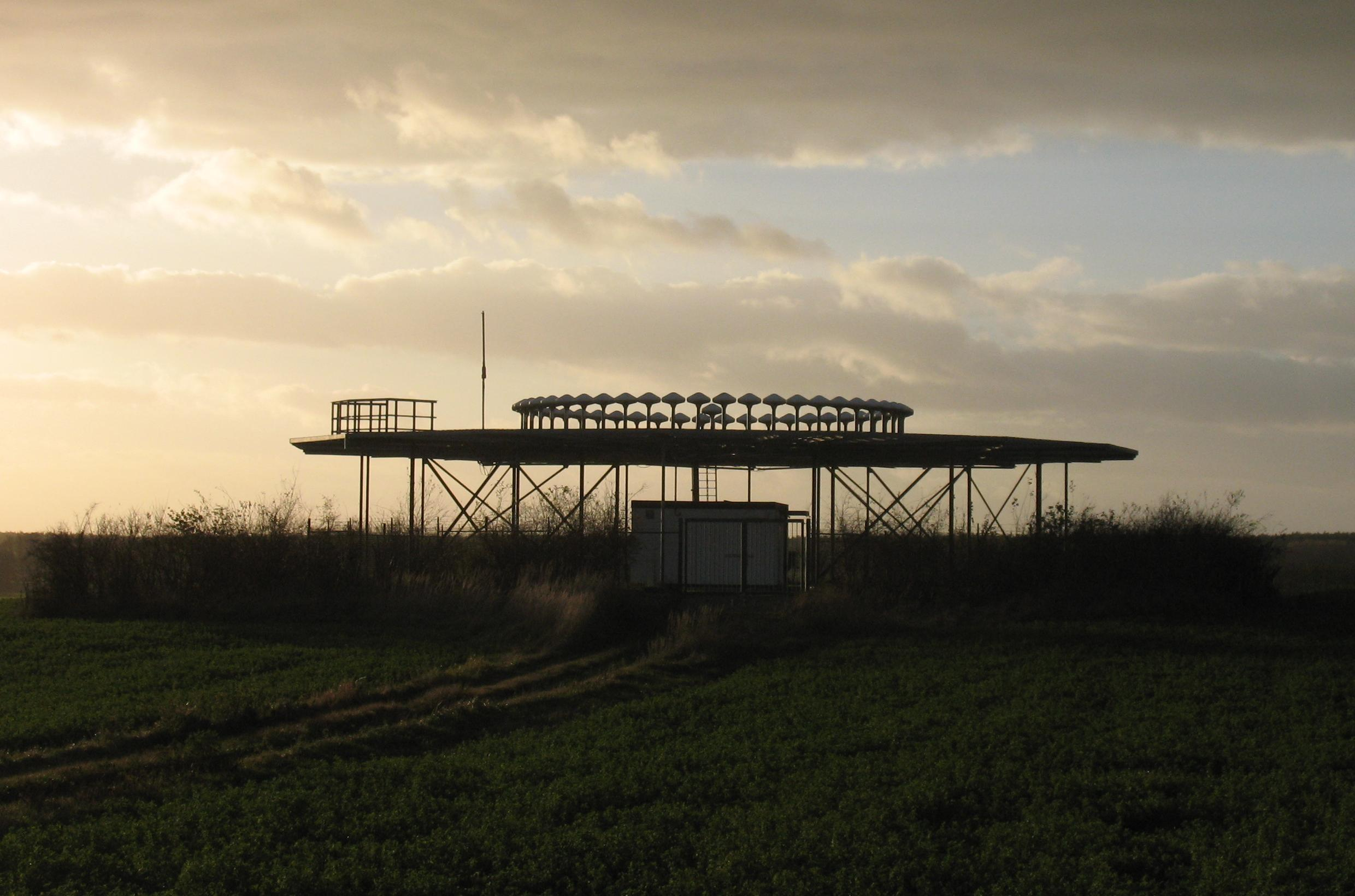
VOR ground antenna near Hoppenrade

Development of Population since 1875 within the Current Boundaries (Blue Line: Population; Dotted Line: Comparison to Population Development of Brandenburg state; Grey background: Time of Nazi rule—Red background: Time of communist rule)

Recent Population Development and Projections (Population Development before Census 2011 (blue line); Recent Population Development according to the Census in Germany in 2011 (blue bordered line); Official projections for 2005-2030 (yellow line); for 2020-2030 (green line); for 2017-2030 (scarlet line)

Löwenberger Land: Population development
within the current boundaries (2013)

Year	Pop.	±% p.a.
1875	6,624	—
1890	7,334	+0.68%
1910	7,569	+0.16%
1925	8,002	+0.37%
1933	8,365	+0.56%
1939	9,195	+1.59%
1946	13,085	+5.17%
1950	12,565	−1.01%
1964	9,998	−1.62%
1971	9,900	−0.14%
1981	8,837	−1.13%
1985	8,733	−0.30%
1989	8,647	−0.25%
1990	8,527	−1.39%
1991	8,432	−1.11%

Year	Pop.	±% p.a.
1992	8,358	−0.88%
1993	8,302	−0.67%
1994	8,280	−0.26%
1995	8,294	+0.17%
1996	8,290	−0.05%
1997	8,205	−1.03%
1998	8,260	+0.67%
1999	8,437	+2.14%
2000	8,471	+0.40%
2001	8,472	+0.01%
2002	8,481	+0.11%
2003	8,457	−0.28%
2004	8,436	−0.25%
2005	8,425	−0.13%
2006	8,305	−1.42%

Year	Pop.	±% p.a.
2007	8,230	−0.90%
2008	8,140	−1.09%
2009	8,093	−0.58%
2010	8,072	−0.26%
2011	8,016	−0.69%
2012	7,967	−0.61%
2013	7,975	+0.10%
2014	8,041	+0.83%
2015	8,101	+0.75%
2016	8,084	−0.21%
2017	8,157	+0.90%
2018	8,260	+1.26%
2019	8,411	+1.83%
2020	8,460	+0.58%
