= Witness (Benjamin Booker album) =

Studio album by Benjamin Booker
- Released: 2 June 2017
- Studios: The Isokon Studio; (Woodstock, NY); Red Delicious Studio; (New York City, NY)
- Genres: Blues rock; garage rock; indie rock
- Length: 32:07
- Labels: ATO; Rough Trade
- Producer: Sam Cohen

Benjamin Booker chronology
Benjamin Booker (2014)	Witness (2017)

Witness is the second studio album by American musician Benjamin Booker. It was released on 2 June 2017 by ATO Records and Rough Trade Records.

== Background ==
Witness was announced with the premiere of its title track on March 9, 2017. Booker published an essay alongside the announcement, detailing the experience that led him towards writing the album's title track. The title track's references to police brutality and activism garnered Booker coverage in politically leaning outlets including Mic, which noted the album's “urgent synthesis of blues, gospel and soul — forms with long histories of translating black pain into uplifting and enduring compositions … with a raw and unforgiving candor that's reminiscent of downtown New York punk.

The opening track "Right on You" was shared on April 19 by The Fader, which called it "a staticky, high-tempo ballad that packs a punch". The third song to be released from the album, "Believe", was premiered by TIME on May 23. In the run-up to the album's release WNYC released a statement about it, describing Booker as “a punk & grit-infused songwriter whose ecstatic and soulful sounds channel vintage soul-rock, gospel, and blues.”

== Critical reception ==
Professional ratings
Aggregate scores
Source	Rating
Metacritic	79/100
Review scores
Source	Rating
AllMusic	4.5/5 stars
Exclaim!	7/10
Pitchfork	8.1/10

Upon its release Witness generally received positive reviews from contemporary critics. At Metacritic, which assigns a normalized rating out of 100 to reviews from mainstream critics, the album received an average score of 79, based on 15 reviews, which indicates "generally favorable reviews".

In a review for AllMusic, editor Stephen Thomas Erlewine described that "Blues remains [Booker's] foundation and he can still indulge in squalls of noise, but there's a heavy soul vibe here and, crucially, Booker is embracing modern production. That much is clear from the way "Right on You" opens with burbling electronics before descending into a rocking riff that grooves harder than anything on his debut. Witness is filled with these kinds of left turns, ranging from the folk-soul of "Motivation" and the old-fashioned Southern soul of "Believe" to the psychedelic thrum of "Truth Is Heavy." This aural variety alone would make Witness an exciting record, but when these sounds are paired with probing political and personal songs, the album becomes something fresh and vital."

Contributor H. Drew Blackburn stated in his review for Pitchfork, that it “makes retro music feel modern, reflecting on racism in America while drawing on blues, soul, and gospel.”

Exclaim! writer Ryan B. Patrick wrote: "Witness owes its imperfect existence to garage-punk, psychedelic Afro-rock and the overarching and heartbreaking sentiment that ours is a system that we might not get out from under anytime soon."

== Track listing ==
All tracks are written by Benjamin Booker.

No.	Title	Length
1.	"Right on You"	2:33
2.	"Motivation"	3:32
3.	"Witness" (featuring Mavis Staples)	2:57
4.	"The Slow Drag Under"	3:49
5.	"Truth Is Heavy"	3:54
6.	"Believe"	3:54
7.	"Overtime"	4:04
8.	"Off the Ground"	2:26
9.	"Carry"	3:21
10.	"All Was Well"	1:53

== Personnel ==
Credits adapted from Rough Trade Records.

- Benjamin Booker – primary artist
- Sam Cohen – producer
- Shawn Everett – mixing
- Mavis Staples – additional vocals on "Witness"
