= Dry Cleaning discography =

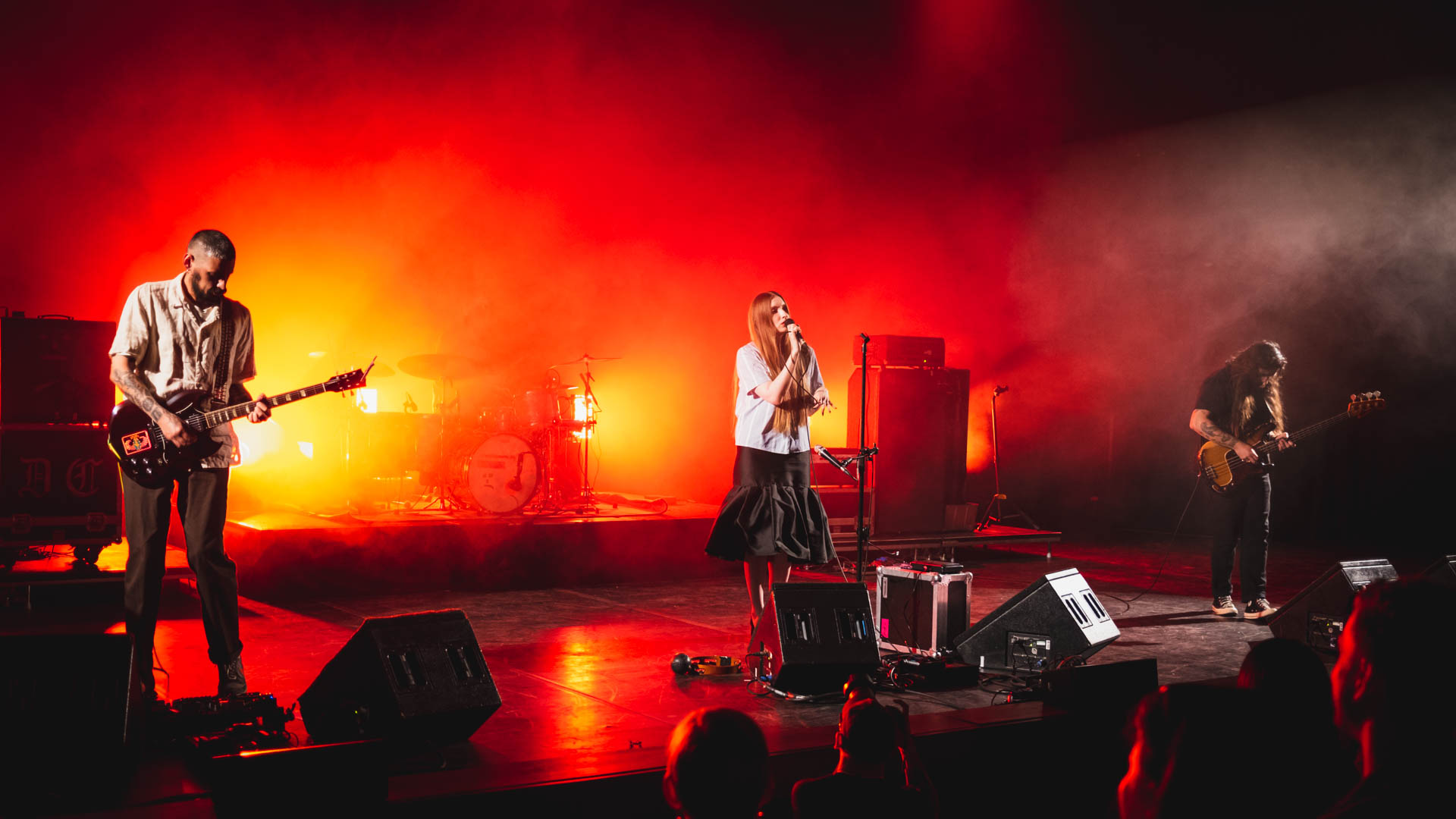
- Dry Cleaning at Meltdown Festival, 2022
- Studio albums: 3
- EPs: 2
- Live albums: 1
- Compilation albums: 1
- Singles: 18
- Music videos: 33
- Compilation EPs: 1
- Demo EPs: 1
- Compilation appearances: 1

The discography of English post-punk band Dry Cleaning consists of three studio albums, two extended plays, one live album, one compilation album, 18 singles, one compilation EP, one demo EP, and one compilation album appearance. Their catalogue begins with the self-released EP Sweet Princess from 2018. It was reissued the next year on the It's OK label and was soon followed by their second EP Boundary Road Snacks and Drinks (2019).

After announcing their signing to the independent record label 4AD in 2020, Dry Cleaning's debut full-length record New Long Leg was released in 2021 and was produced by John Parish. The album peaked on the UK Albums Chart at no. 4, the band's highest position to date in their native UK. In addition, it topped the UK Independent Albums Chart, and it charted in several other countries, including Belgium, Germany, Ireland, and Portugal. This was followed by an EP of demos from the album's sessions entitled Tascam Tapes later that year.

The band's second studio album, Stumpwork (2022), was again produced by John Parish. While not as successful on the UK charts (landing at no. 11), it had fared better than their debut in Germany and Belgium's Flanders region. The compilation EP Swampy followed in 2023. Their third studio album Secret Love arrived in early 2026, more than three-and-a-half years after Stumpwork. This time, they were produced by the Welsh singer-songwriter Cate Le Bon. It performed similarly to their second album on the UK charts, though it was their best-charting record in Germany up to that point, reaching the top 50.

== Studio albums ==
List of studio albums, with selected chart positions
Title	Details	Peak chart positions									
Title	Details	UK	UK Indie	AUS	BEL (FL)	GER	IRE	POR	SCO	US Sales	US Heat.
New Long Leg	Released: 2 April 2021; Label: 4AD; Formats: LP, CD, cassette, digital download, streaming	4	1	—	67	85	45	26	4	60	16
Stumpwork	Released: 21 October 2022; Label: 4AD; Formats: LP, CD, cassette, digital download, streaming	11	4	77	30	51	—	33	9	34	13
Secret Love	Released: 9 January 2026; Label: 4AD; Formats: LP, CD, cassette, digital download, streaming	12	3	34	101	47	—	116	4	32	×
"—" denotes a recording that did not chart or was not released in that territory. "×" denotes a defunct chart.

== Extended plays ==
List of extended plays, with selected chart positions
Title	Details	Peak chart positions
Title	Details	UK DL
Sweet Princess	Released: September 2018; Label: self-released; Formats: Digital download, streaming, cassette	83
Boundary Road Snacks and Drinks	Released: 25 October 2019; Label: It's OK; Formats: Digital download, streaming	—

== Live albums ==
List of live albums
Title	Details
Live at Kentish Town Forum (3 March 2022)	Label: It's OK; Format: Cassette

== Compilations ==
=== Albums ===
List of compilation albums, with selected chart positions
Title	Details	Peak chart positions		
Title	Details	UK Indie	UK Phys.	SCO
Boundary Road Snacks and Drinks/Sweet Princess	Released: 25 October 2019; Label: It's OK; Format: LP	7	14	17

=== Extended plays ===
List of compilation EPs, with selected chart positions
Title	Details	Peak chart positions
Title	Details	UK DL
Swampy	Released: 1 March 2023; Label: 4AD; Formats: Digital download, cassette	51

== Singles ==
List of singles with relevant details
Year	Title	Peak chart positions		Album/EP	Ref.
Year	Title	UK Sales	UK Phys.	Album/EP	Ref.
2019	"Magic of Meghan"	—	—	Sweet Princess	
2019	"Goodnight"	—	—	Sweet Princess	
2019	"Sit Down Meal"	—	—	Boundary Road Snacks and Drinks	
2019	"Viking Hair"	—	—	Boundary Road Snacks and Drinks	
2020	"Scratchcard Lanyard"	—	15	New Long Leg	
2021	"Strong Feelings"	—	—	New Long Leg	
2021	"Unsmart Lady"	56	2	New Long Leg	
2021	"Bug Eggs" / "Tony Speaks!"	—	—	Non-album single	
2022	"Don't Press Me"	—	—	Stumpwork	
2022	"Anna Calls from the Arctic"	—	—	Stumpwork	
2022	"Gary Ashby"	—	—	Stumpwork	
2022	"No Decent Shoes for Rain"	—	—	Stumpwork	
2023	"Swampy" / "Sombre Two"	—	—	Swampy	
2025	"Hit My Head All Day"	—	—	Secret Love	
2025	"Cruise Ship Designer"	—	—	Secret Love	
2025	"Let Me Grow and You'll See the Fruit"	—	—	Secret Love	
2026	"Joy"	—	—	Secret Love	
2026	"Sliced by a Fingernail"	—	—	Secret Love (deluxe)	

== Demo EPs ==
List of demo EPs, with selected chart positions
Title	Details	Peak chart positions	
Title	Details	UK Sales	UK Phys.
Tascam Tapes	Released: November 2021; Label: 4AD; Formats: 12 inch vinyl	47	3

== Compilation appearances ==
- Bills & Aches & Blues (2021) by 4AD – "Oblivion" (Grimes cover)

== Music videos ==
List of music videos with relevant details
Year	Title	Album/EP	Director/Creator	Ref.
2019	"Magic of Meghan"	Sweet Princess	Lucy Vann	
2019	"Viking Hair"	Boundary Road Snacks and Drinks	Dry Cleaning, Pedro Pina	
2020	"Scratchcard Lanyard"	New Long Leg	Rottingdean Bazaar	
2021	"Strong Feelings"	New Long Leg	Tom Dowse (director), Sabato Visconti (glitch art)	
2021	"Unsmart Lady"	New Long Leg	Tilly Shiner	
2022	"Don't Press Me"	Stumpwork	Peter Millard	
2022	"Anna Calls from the Arctic"	Stumpwork	Dry Cleaning	
2022	"No Decent Shoes for Rain"	Stumpwork	Dry Cleaning	
2023	"Gary Ashby"	Stumpwork	Rik Burnell	
2024	"Sit Down Meal"	Boundary Road Snacks and Drinks	Lucy Vann	
2024	"Phone Scam"	Sweet Princess	Lucy Vann	
2024	"Dog Proposal"	Boundary Road Snacks and Drinks	Lucy Vann	
2024	"Goodnight"	Sweet Princess	Lucy Vann	
2024	"Conversation"	Sweet Princess	Lucy Vann	
2024	"Spoils"	Boundary Road Snacks and Drinks	Lucy Vann	
2024	"Jam After School"	Boundary Road Snacks and Drinks	Lucy Vann	
2024	"New Job"	Sweet Princess	Lucy Vann	
2024	"Traditional Fish"	Sweet Princess	Lucy Vann	
2024	"Sombre One"	Boundary Road Snacks and Drinks	Lucy Vann	
2025	"Hit My Head All Day"	Secret Love	Bullyache (choreography)	
2025	"Cruise Ship Designer"	Secret Love	Cuán Roche (director), Bullyache (choreography)	
2025	"Let Me Grow and You'll See the Fruit"	Secret Love	Bullyache (choreography)	
2026	"Joy"	Secret Love	Cuán Roche (director), Bullyache (choreography)	
2026	"Secret Love (Concealed in a Drawing of a Boy)"	Secret Love	Bullyache (choreography)	
2026	"I Need You"	Secret Love	Bullyache (choreography)	
2026	"My Soul"	Secret Love	Bullyache (choreography)	
2026	"Blood"	Secret Love	Bullyache (choreography)	
2026	"The Cute Things"	Secret Love	Bullyache (choreography)	
2026	"Evil Evil Idiot"	Secret Love	Bullyache (choreography)	
2026	"Rocks"	Secret Love	Bullyache (choreography)	
2026	"Sliced by a Fingernail"	Secret Love (deluxe)	Bullyache (choreography)	
2026	"I Have the Key"	Secret Love (deluxe)	Bullyache (choreography)	
2026	"Grass"	Secret Love (deluxe)	Bullyache (choreography)	
