= Boundary Road =

Boundary Road may refer to:

- Boundary Road or Boundary Street, the former name of Florida Avenue in Washington DC
- Boundary Road Brewery, a craft beer brand produced by Independent Breweries NZ
- Boundary Road (Ottawa), in the Nepean—Carleton electoral district of Ontario, Canada
- Boundary Road Snacks and Drinks, the 2019 EP by Dry Cleaning

== See also ==
- Boundary Street, Kowloon, Hong Kong
