= Swampy =

Swampy means "of or resembling a swamp".

Swampy may also refer to:

== People ==
- Geoff Marsh (born 1958), Australian cricketer
- Jeff "Swampy" Marsh (born 1960), American animator
- John Barnett (whistleblower) (1961/62–2024), American engineer and whistleblower
- Anthony Hamilton (snooker player) (born 1971), English snooker player
- Swampy (environmentalist) (Daniel Hooper, born 1973), British environmental activist

== Other ==
- Swampy Cree, native Americans (and their language)
- Swampy, a character in the video game Where's My Water?
- "Swampy", jazz instrumental by Chico Hamilton from the album Chic Chic Chico
- Swampy, a 2023 extended play by Dry Cleaning
