= Scratchcard Lanyard =

Single by Dry Cleaning

from the album New Long Leg
- B-side: "Bug Eggs"
- Released: 19 November 2020
- Recorded: August 2020
- Studio: Rockfield (Monmouthshire, Wales)
- Genre: Post-punk; spoken word
- Length: 4:07
- Label: 4AD
- Composers: Nick Buxton; Tom Dowse; Lewis Maynard
- Lyricist: Florence Shaw
- Producer: John Parish

Dry Cleaning singles chronology
"Viking Hair" (2019)	"Scratchcard Lanyard" (2020)	"Strong Feelings" (2021)

Audio sample
- file; help

Music video
- "Scratchcard Lanyard" on YouTube

"Scratchcard Lanyard" is a song by the English post-punk band Dry Cleaning, released on 19 November 2020 as their debut for the record label 4AD and lead single for their debut album New Long Leg (2021). It was produced by John Parish.

== Background and recording ==
Following their EPs Sweet Princess (2018) and Boundary Road Snacks and Drinks (2019), Dry Cleaning signed to the independent record label 4AD in March 2020. "Scratchcard Lanyard" marks their debut for the label. It was included as the opener for their debut album New Long Leg (2021), whose material at large was written before and after the onset of the COVID-19 pandemic. Produced and mixed by John Parish, the song was recorded at Rockfield Studios in Wales in August 2020, then mixed at Invada Studios the following month.

== Composition ==
Florence Shaw, who wrote the lyrics, has said that the song is a revenge fantasy. It addresses her frustrations about the societal expectations placed upon women past the age of thirty, such as motherhood. The song's protagonist, seeking out a sense of self-purpose, explores a number of creative outlets. Delivered via Shaw's deadpan, spoken word vocals, the lyrics are interspersed with imagery ranging from the mundane ("I've come to hand-weave my own bunk bed ladder in a few short sessions") to the absurd ("I think of myself as a hardy banana with that waxy surface and the small delicate flowers"). On the refrain, Shaw repeats the phrase "Do everything and feel nothing", a commentary on the commodification of life experiences in the age of social media. Like the band's preceding EPs, the lyrics often center around food, including a reference to Twix bars.

The upbeat, post-punk musical backing was composed by the band's instrumental trio: drummer Nick Buxton, guitarist Tom Dowse, and bassist Lewis Maynard. Making use of a drum machine from Buxton, it begins with a beat and bassline, then adds the guitar and vocals.

== Music video ==
The music video for "Scratchcard Lanyard" is centered on a miniaturised set, with vocalist Florence Shaw's face placed between the red stage curtains as she performs. At various points throughout the video, it zooms outside the set to show the rest of the band playing alongside her. The video was directed and designed by Rottingdean Bazaar, a duo comprising artists James Theseus Buck and Luke Brooks. It was their directorial debut. The video was nominated at the 2021 UK Music Video Awards for Best Rock Video in the Newcomer subcategory. Rottingdean Bazaar would later go on to win a Grammy for Best Recording Package alongside Annie Collinge for Dry Cleaning's second album Stumpwork (2022).

== Promotion and release ==
"Scratchcard Lanyard" was released on 19 November 2020 with a music video. It was their debut on the independent record label 4AD. With the subsequent single "Strong Feelings" the following February, it was revealed that "Scratchcard Lanyard" was the lead single to their forthcoming album New Long Leg. On 19 November 2021, exactly one year after its initial release, they performed the song on The Tonight Show Starring Jimmy Fallon, the band's first late-night TV show appearance in the U.S.

In conjunction with the release of New Long Leg on 2 April 2021, a free 7-inch vinyl of the single was available with copies of the album in select independent record stores. Its B-side was the track "Bug Eggs". Following this, the single charted in the UK on the Official Physical Singles Chart at no. 15. "Bug Eggs" was also present on the Japanese edition of New Long Leg, along with "Tony Speaks!". Both were recorded around the same time as "Scratchcard Lanyard", and in July, they were released together as a double A-side single.

== Critical reception ==
In Rolling Stone, Simon Vozick-Levinson said "it has all the strange allure" of their first two EPs, adding on "a little extra verve and polish" with the help of producer John Parish. On the website Pitchfork, Ben Cardew described Shaw's "affably dry, permanently bemused tone" as a performance that is "at delicious odds with any kind of musical convention". Speaking of the interaction between Shaw and the instrumentals, Tom Piekarski of Exclaim! thought the band "elevate" her lyrics "to anthemic proportions."

=== Year-end lists ===
Publication	List	Rank	Ref.
Exclaim!	30 Best Songs of 2021	7	
Louder Than War	Top Twenty Tracks of the Year 2021	2	
Paste	The 50 Best Songs of 2020	50	
Pitchfork	The 100 Best Songs of 2021	29	
Spin	The 30 Best Songs of 2021	14	
Variety	The 50 Best Songs of 2021	26	

== Legacy ==
In February 2021, the song got the attention of Suede frontman Brett Anderson, who said it was "Easily the most exciting thing I've heard in a while ... It popped up one afternoon on the radio and I just stood there mesmerised. I love the word play and the clever use of cultural ephemera set against the grinding, wiry post-punk sort of backing. Brilliant."

In October 2024, the magazine Paste placed "Scratchcard Lanyard" at number 14 on its list of "The 100 Best Songs of the 2020s So Far", with Alli Dempsey calling the song "Ahead of the curve ... in a sometimes oversaturated subgenre", referring to the wave of post-punk spoken word bands that appeared at the start of the decade.

== Track listing ==
"Scratchcard Lanyard" 7-inch vinyl track listing
No.	Title	Length
1.	"Scratchcard Lanyard"	4:07
2.	"Bug Eggs"	3:22

== Personnel ==
Credits are adapted from Tidal, except where noted.

=== Dry Cleaning ===
- Nick Buxton – drums, drum machine
- Tom Dowse – guitar
- Lewis Maynard – bass
- Florence Shaw – vocals

=== Additional contributors ===
- John Parish – production, mixing
- Joe Jones, Stu Matthews – engineering
- Ray Collins Enterprises – machinery and lorry photographs

== Charts ==
Chart performance for "Scratchcard Lanyard"
Chart (2021)	Peak position
UK Physical Singles (OCC)	15
UK Vinyl Singles (OCC)	11
