= Secret Love (Dry Cleaning album) =

Studio album by Dry Cleaning
- Released: 9 January 2026
- Recorded: June 2024 – May 2025
- Studios: Black Box (Loire Valley); The Loft (Chicago); Vacant TV (London)
- Genres: Post-punk; spoken word
- Length: 41:01
- Label: 4AD
- Producer: Cate Le Bon

Dry Cleaning chronology
Swampy (2023)	Secret Love (2026)

Singles from Secret Love
- 1. "Hit My Head All Day" Released: 29 September 2025; 2. "Cruise Ship Designer" Released: 11 November 2025; 3. "Let Me Grow and You'll See the Fruit" Released: 9 December 2025; 4. "Joy" Released: 5 January 2026

Secret Love is the third studio album by the English post-punk band Dry Cleaning, released on 9 January 2026 through 4AD Records and produced by the Welsh musician Cate Le Bon. It follows Stumpwork (2022) by more than three years and is their first album not produced by John Parish. Musically, the band continued to expand upon the post-punk style that defined their earlier work, and Florence Shaw's otherwise spoken word delivery increasingly relied on sung vocals.

After starting to write new material in summer 2024, Dry Cleaning recorded a series of demos at various studios, including Wilco's The Loft in Chicago and Gilla Band's Sonic Studios in Dublin, before deciding on Le Bon to produce. With her, they re-recorded almost everything at Black Box Studios in the Loire Valley, France, in mid-2025. The album was led with the single "Hit My Head All Day" in late September 2025, followed by "Cruise Ship Designer", "Let Me Grow and You'll See the Fruit", and "Joy". Upon release, Secret Love was met with widespread critical acclaim and debuted at no. 12 on the UK Albums Chart. An outtake from the sessions, "Sliced by a Fingernail", followed in late March 2026 as a standalone single.

== Background and recording ==
For their first two albums, New Long Leg (2021) and Stumpwork (2022), Dry Cleaning worked with producer John Parish, and the band decided that for their third, they would benefit from experimenting with new producers. In December 2025, their vocalist and lyricist Florence Shaw told Mojo magazine:

When New Long Leg came out, it was a very insular world. Its recording was quarantine-sensitive – we were all in a bubble with John ... That kind of atmosphere was still weighing quite heavily on the process, even on our second record. So beyond just meeting other musicians at festivals, we wanted to see what actually working with people would be like.

After a performance at Chicago's Pitchfork Music Festival in 2022, they were greeted by Wilco frontman Jeff Tweedy backstage, who was a fan and invited them to visit his nearby studio, The Loft. At the time, Wilco were in the process of recording their album Cousin (2023), which was being produced by the Welsh musician Cate Le Bon, who was also there. Shaw had known of Le Bon as a producer for years, but no one from Dry Cleaning had met her until then. By 2024, the members of Dry Cleaning had started to consider writing for their next full-length record, but when their label 4AD decided to re-release their early EPs, they decided to continue touring, despite having done so since the release of Stumpwork. In the summer, after playing a series of relatively small venues, they briefly returned home to Peckham, London to begin writing; bassist Lewis Maynard later noted that revisiting this earlier material had a direct influence on the writing process: "It pushed us into more interesting directions and showed us the palette that we already had wanted to expand on." Soon after, they went back on tour, spending much of that time as the opening act for Nick Cave and the Bad Seeds.

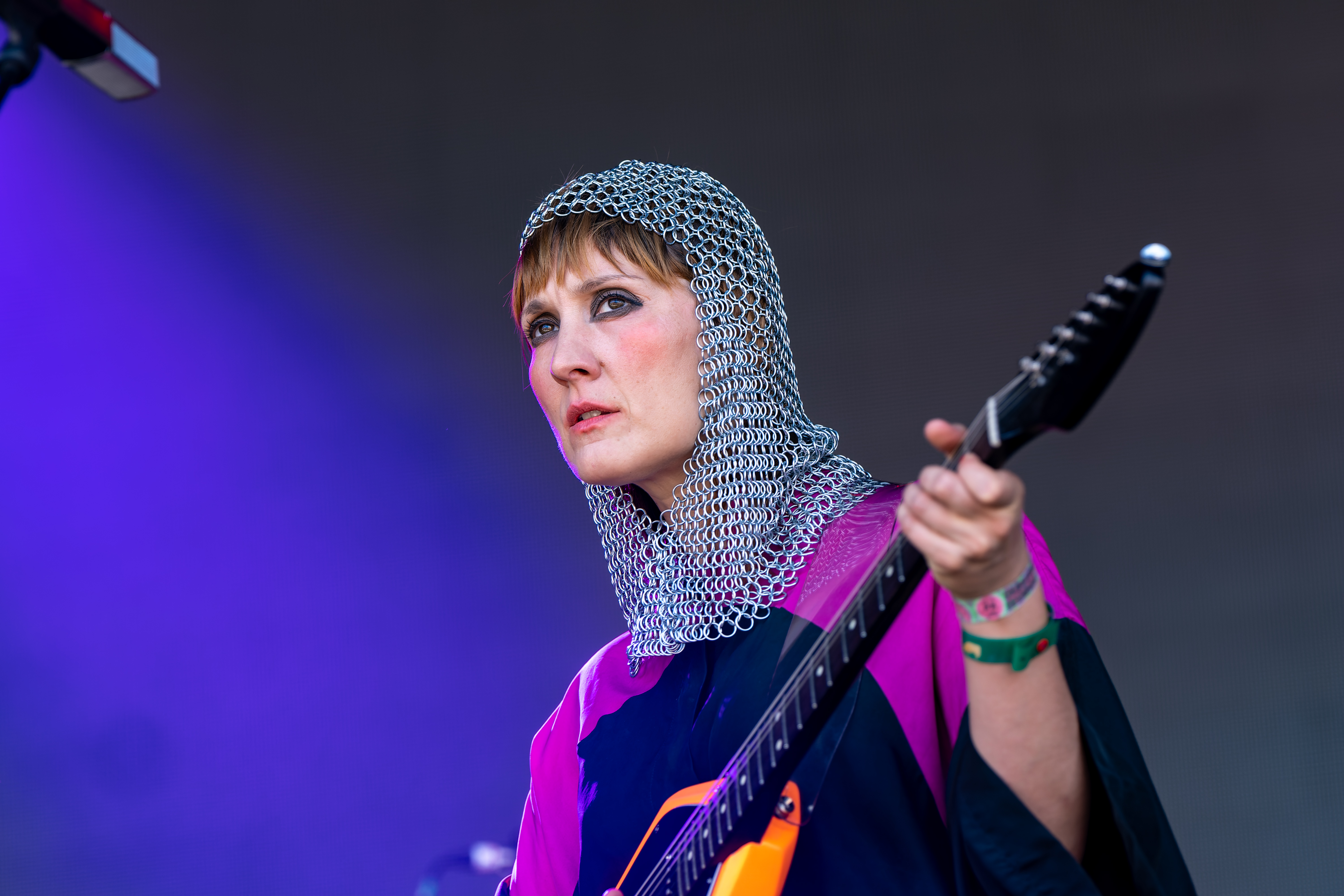
Welsh singer-songwriter Cate Le Bon (pictured) produced Secret Love.

In June 2024, Dry Cleaning performed at Wilco's Solid Sound Festival, during which they were joined onstage by Nels Cline. In exchange for playing for free, they then returned to The Loft, recording a jam to explore new material. Afterward, they spent time at additional studios, recording demos at Sonic Studios in Dublin with Alan Duggan and Daniel Fox of the Gilla Band and briefly working in London at The Fish Factory and Vacant TV Studio. By then, Dry Cleaning had around twenty tracks recorded but were still undecided on a producer. They ultimately chose Le Bon, who convinced them to re-record what they had, keeping only some of the recordings they made at The Loft and Vacant TV Studio. After developing the material with Le Bon in a north London rehearsal space, they recorded with her in May 2025 at Black Box Studios in the Loire Valley in France, reducing the total number of tracks to eleven. According to Shaw, sessions at the farmhouse studio were "intense" but "focused", largely due to how their sleeping arrangements were about a thirty-second walk away.

== Artwork ==
The album's cover artwork was painted by the Scotland-based Canadian artist Erica Eyres. It depicts the band's singer Florence Shaw having her eye washed by someone largely out of frame, holding Shaw's eyelid open. According to Shaw, Eyres did all of the artwork, including the drawn covers for the album's singles. Elaborating further, she stated on an Reddit AMA: "I was a huge fan of [Eyres'] work. We gave her free reign [sic] pretty much, apart from saying we wanted to be in the paintings. ... She was keen on first aid imagery straight off the bat." Eyres later made the artwork for the album's deluxe edition as well.

== Composition ==
=== Style ===
Secret Love has been described broadly as a post-punk record. However, the album sees the quartet continue the expansive musical trajectory that largely started with Stumpwork in 2022, with some critics believing that the post-punk labelling of their earlier work is an increasingly tenuous descriptor. Also, while vocalist Florence Shaw still heavily relies on a spoken word approach, they saw a shift toward a sung delivery, particularly on the choruses. During recording, Le Bon encouraged her to sing when the lyrics were more emotionally-driven, such as on "Secret Love (Concealed in a Drawing of a Boy)" and "I Need You". Le Bon had urged guitarist Tom Dowse to avoid using his SG guitar during recording, so he resorted to other guitars. He said that for much of the "harsher sounds" on the record, he had a Danelectro 1449 that had caught his attention during his time at The Loft in Chicago. He often played through a Hiwatt amplifier with the third version of an Expandora pedal that he had acquired in Japan.

=== First half ===
The album opens with the six-minute-long "Hit My Head All Day", the lengthiest track by a considerable margin. It is a funk track that has been described as reminiscent of David Bowie during his Scary Monsters (and Super Creeps) phase, with Robert Fripp-adjacent guitar parts, drum loops and bongos from Nick Buxton, and a groove-oriented bassline, augmented with synthesisers in the final third. When the band was recording the demos for the opener, they took musical influence from There's a Riot Goin' On by Sly and the Family Stone, while the lyrics were inspired by misinformation that circulates in right-wing social media echo chambers. On the song, in between choruses where Shaw sings the title, the narrator, seeking stimulation, embraces being manipulated by misinformation while recollecting the innocence of their childhood days.

"Cruise Ship Designer"
Songs such as "Cruise Ship Designer" were influenced by Keith Richards' guitar playing on the Rolling Stones album Sticky Fingers (1971).

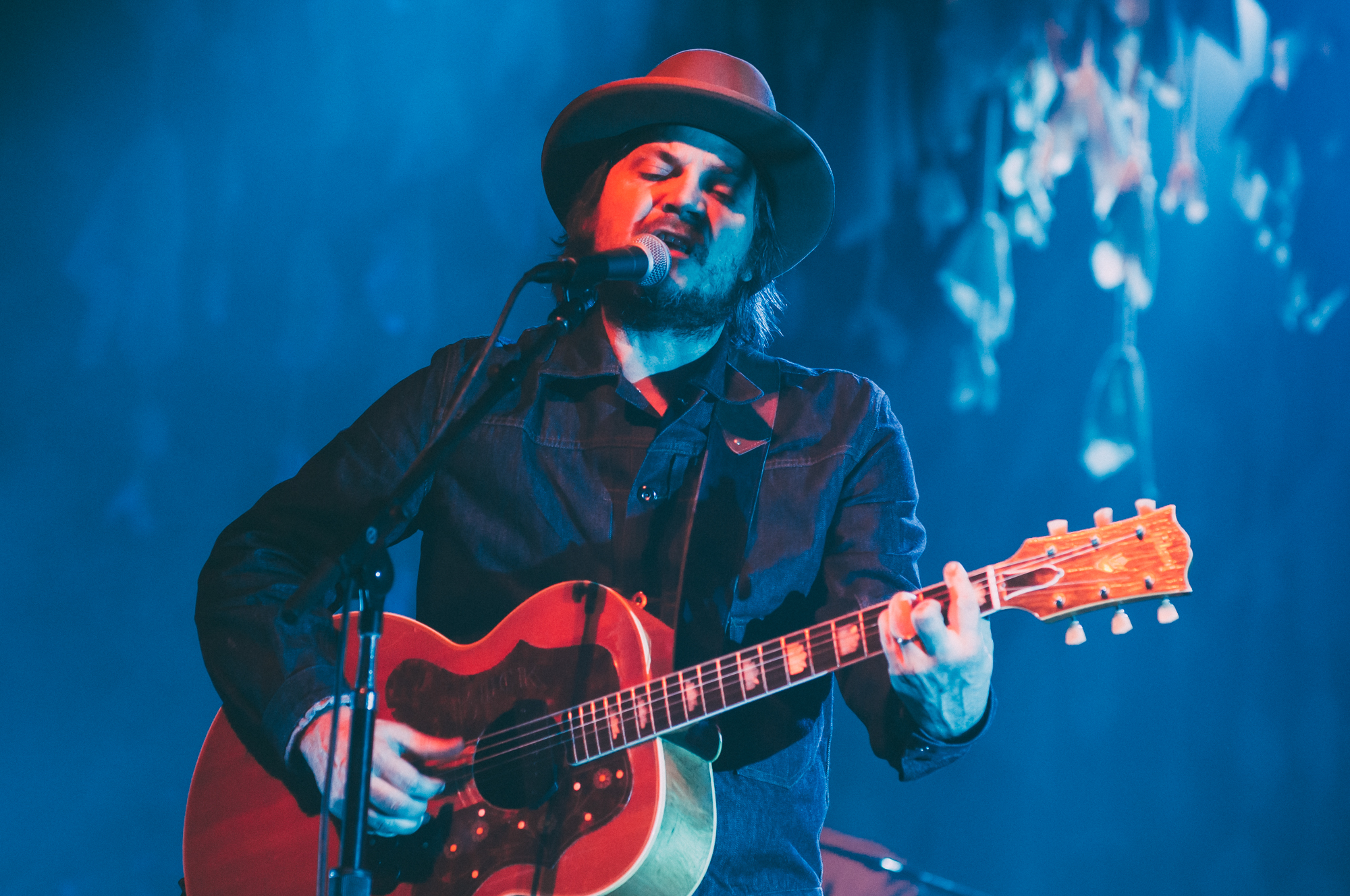
Jeff Tweedy (pictured) contributes additional guitar to "My Soul/Half Pint".

"Cruise Ship Designer" is told from the perspective of someone who designs as a means to rise in social status, despite their personal ambivalence towards cruise ships and lack of ambition. Additionally, lacking self-awareness, they hide messages in their ships to inflate their own sense of worth in their work. As Shaw intones, the rest of the band operates in a call-and-response fashion with their own backing vocals. It is one of the more musically "bright" songs on the album, with Ross Horton of MusicOMH saying that it serves a similar role to that of "Gary Ashby" from Stumpwork. On the domestically-themed "My Soul/Half Pint", the protagonist reveals their hatred of cleaning, bemoaning the societal expectations placed upon women with lyrics such as "Maybe it's time for men to clean for, like, 500 times." This is juxtaposed with music that becomes increasingly cheerful as it progresses, adding in piano and extra guitar parts (the latter performed by Jeff Tweedy). In the years leading up to Secret Love, Dowse had been listening more to the Rolling Stones, whose Keith Richards was a major influence on his playing for both "Cruise Ship Designer" and "My Soul/Half Pint".

The following two tracks take a more folk-based approach. The first, on which Dowse contributes mandolin, is "Secret Love (Concealed in a Drawing of a Boy)", a love story where the narrator's romantic feelings are expressed in an object. The second, "Let Me Grow and You'll See the Fruit", is driven by acoustic guitars and augmented with saxophone from Bruce Lamont. It is a story of isolation wherein the protagonist first expresses their joy at finally achieving solitude, later to feel ultimately lonely and alienated.

=== Second half ===
"Rocks"
After the second chorus of "Rocks", Tom Dowse creates a looping guitar effect by utilising the hold function of a Boss DD-3 pedal, inspired by Botch's We Are the Romans (1999).

Some of the album's darker moments were originally developed during their time in Dublin recording with the Gilla Band, who had focused much of their efforts towards the drums, resulting in a more industrial sound. Although the recordings themselves were re-done, Gilla Band members Alan Duggan and Daniel remain credited in the liner notes as additional arrangers on "Blood" and "Evil Evil Idiot". The former begins with a guitar riff influenced by Johnny Marr, then continues with a consistent kick drum. The character in the song, initially critical of war and capitalistic elites who take advantage of the system, becomes so inundated by the constant online barrage of violence from global conflicts that blood manifests itself on them. The narrative then shifts to a quote that Shaw overheard in her increasingly gentrified neighbourhood in London: "The people in house at the moment are renting/So it's all good, anytime, we can move in." "Evil Evil Idiot" is a slow-burn rock piece that starts sparingly until Dowse joins the rest of the band with a guitar riff. The song focuses on the life of a wellness influencer who extols harmful advice about processed meat and microwaved meals. "Rocks" is the heaviest track on Secret Love, featuring noisy guitars and industrial snare drums and providing a contrast with Shaw's comparatively muted performance.

On the familially-themed "The Cute Things", the band return to a Rolling Stones-influenced sound, borrowing elements of Americana music and ending with a guitar solo from Dowse. In a mood shift, the slow, penultimate track "I Need You" centers itself on bass clarinet (played by Stephen Black) and synthesised drones. The song features lyrics of romantic longing, symbolised via a box of talcum powder. It also refers to the television show The Apprentice, which Shaw has clarified is about the UK version with Alan Sugar, something she perceives as relatively harmless in comparison to the U.S. version. Similar to "Every Day Carry" from New Long Leg and "Icebergs" from Stumpwork, the album concludes on a relatively positive note. On "Joy", Shaw states her optimistic desire to create a world without violence and free from toxic masculinity, urging to listeners: "Don't give up on being sweet". Dowse's guitar playing on the closer was influenced by the "guitar-pop sound" of Guided by Voices.

== Promotion ==
=== Singles ===
Secret Love was officially announced on 29 September 2025 with the release of its lead single, the six-minute-long "Hit My Head All Day". Shortly afterwards, for the last show of a U.S. tour in early October, the band performed three other album tracks ("My Soul / Half Pint", "Evil Evil Idiot", and "Joy") at Warsaw in Brooklyn, New York.

A second single, "Cruise Ship Designer", was released on 11 November 2025 with a Cuán Roche-directed video featuring the band's bassist Lewis Maynard, then on 9 December, they released "Let Me Grow and You'll See the Fruit" as the third single, with a video starring the Chicago-based musician Bruce Lamont, who also contributed saxophone to the track.

On 5 January 2026, just four days before the album's release, the closer "Joy" was released as the fourth single. It was accompanied with another video directed by Roche. Dry Cleaning guitarist Tom Dowse, who stars in the video, said in a press release that the band sought a less "impressionistic" approach to their music videos for Secret Love, enlisting Bullyache to choreograph one for each song on the album. Each was filmed at a hotel called The Mandrake in London.

On 31 March, Dry Cleaning released a standalone single entitled "Sliced by a Fingernail". It was accompanied by a visualiser by Bullyache and was recorded with producer Cate Le Bon at Black Box Studios. The band said on Instagram that the single is an outtake from the Secret Love sessions, adding that it most likely originated during their sessions in Dublin, or possibly even earlier than that.

=== Tour ===
In support of the album, Dry Cleaning announced a 2026 tour, starting on 3 January at the Rockaway Beach Festival in Bognor Regis, England, and headlining several dates. Originally, they were scheduled to perform in North America from late January to February, with YHWH Nailgun as the supporting act. However, upon releasing their third single in December 2025, the band announced that they had to reschedule that leg of the tour, citing "a number of factors, not least of which the increasingly hostile economic forces that govern touring in the present day." The majority of the North American dates were moved to late April and May.

Shortly after the release of the standalone single "Sliced by a Fingernail" in late March, the band is slated to continue their 2026 tour in Europe and North America, starting on 7 April at the Festsaal Kreuzberg in Berlin, Germany and ending on 31 July at the All Together Now festival in Curraghmore, Ireland. They are scheduled to be variously joined on tour by Hotline TNT, Jerkcurb, Search Results, Silicone Prairie, Snõõper, Station Model Violence, Tony Bontana, the Tubs, and YHWH Nailgun.

== Release ==
Secret Love was released on 9 January 2026 by 4AD, following Stumpwork from 2022 by more than three-and-a-half years. It debuted on the UK Albums Chart at no. 12, though it placed higher in Scotland at no. 4 and on the UK Independent chart at no. 3. In Australia and New Zealand, the album reached the top 40, with respective positions of 34 and 28.

=== Deluxe edition ===
On 14 July, a deluxe expanded edition of the album was released digitally, containing the previously-released single "Sliced by a Fingernail" and two other new songs from the Secret Love sessions with Le Bon: "Grass" and "I Have the Key". The deluxe album, which includes new artwork, was accompanied by videos for each bonus track by Bullyache, who choreographed visualisers for all songs on the original album. The videos star Nicole Nevitt whipping her hair and Sam Dilke thrashing around. The vinyl version of the deluxe album is scheduled for 16 October via Dinked, who will issue it as part of their Dinked International series. The original album will come in 12-inch purple vinyl, packaged with an additional 12-inch mint-coloured vinyl containing the bonus tracks.

== Critical reception ==
Professional ratings
Aggregate scores
Source	Rating
AnyDecentMusic?	8.0/10
Metacritic	87/100
Review scores
Source	Rating
AllMusic	4.5/5 stars
The A.V. Club	B+
Clash	9/10
DIY	4/5 stars
The Guardian	4/5 stars
Mojo	5/5 stars
MusicOMH	5/5 stars
NME	4/5 stars
Pitchfork	7.9/10
The Skinny	3/5 stars

According to the review aggregator Metacritic, Secret Love received "universal acclaim" based on a weighted average score of 87 out of 100 from 22 critic scores. Another aggregator, AnyDecentMusic?, gave the album 8.0 out of 10 based on a sample of 23 critical reviews.

In Uncut, Stuart Stubbs said that in 2021, upon their "impressive" debut album New Long Leg, "there was a sense that ... [they] would struggle to surprise a second time", but after a successful second album, their third "obliterates the thought entirely", rating Secret Love 9 out of 10 and calling it "the most varied (and often delicate) the band has ever sounded." Victoria Segal of Mojo awarded the album five stars and thought that "Dry Cleaning have lost none of their distinctive edge" in light of the continued expansion of their sound, adding "their idiosyncratic set-up [is] proving to be endlessly elastic, as big as they want, as small as they need, to capture the chaos of the world." For Alexis Petridis of The Guardian, the band put behind their "WTF? novelty value" with Secret Love, with Petridis praising the continued shift in sound and Shaw's lyrics for not feeling "weird for weirdness’s sake: they have a genuine gut-level emotional impact."

Rating it four stars out of five for Record Collector, Shaun Curran said that, given the band's increasingly expansive trajectory combined with the "excellent production" from Cate Le Bon, Secret Love is their "best work yet", and "Shaw's lyrics are still some of the most imaginative in alternative music". Igor Bannikov of Clash similarly also called it their best record thus far and added that while it doesn't contain the "big hits or memorable lines" of their past work, with the aid of Le Bon, they created both their most mainstream and most experimental record. According to David James Young of the NME, Secret Love is another "accomplished, assured effort" from the group but one "that subverts the expectations set up by them." Young concluded their review by noting that although the band are already "on the edge" musically, they "are still finding new terrain to explore – and you imagine they'll be at it for a while yet."

Bella Martin of DIY stated that "It's not a record likely to shift anyone's needle on Dry Cleaning," but thought Le Bon's production "offers an – if not fresh, then comfortably renewed – extra layer to dive into." Elsewhere, editors at AllMusic gave Secret Love four-and-a-half stars out of five, with Heather Phares saying that "Le Bon opens up their music and makes the most of its malleability" and concluding the album found the band "transcending their role as sprechgesang post-punk standard-bearers to become innovators". In a three-star review for The Skinny, Tony Inglis opined that the musical and production choices were "mostly safe" in comparison to their previous album Stumpwork (2022), with the exception of tracks such as "I Need You". John Amen of Beats Per Minute gave it a rating of 72% and described the interactions between Shaw and the instrumentalists as "abstractly intriguing, though also, occasionally, a bit lackluster"; Amen separately lamented Shaw's commentary on consumerism as being relatively "defeatist" compared to her critiques on their first two albums.

In a 7 out of 10 review for PopMatters, reviewer Patrick Gill said that while the album felt lacking in cohesion at times, the band "sound greater than the sum of their parts," an improvement over its "weary and contrived" predecessor. No Ripcord's Juan Edgardo Rodríguez stated that whereas Stumpwork "felt like a chore at times", Secret Love was an easier record from which to discern meaning, given Shaw's abstract lyrical tendencies. Patrick Clarke of The Quietus described the instrumentals as having "taken a noticeable leap forward since 2022's Stumpwork", and they said that overall, the band "have never felt so closely intertwined, nor as broad in their capabilities", crediting much of this to the collaborators they worked with along the way, particularly Le Bon, Jeff Tweedy, and the Gilla Band's Alan Duggan and Daniel Fox.

== Track listing ==
All lyrics are written by Florence Shaw; all music is composed by Dry Cleaning.

Secret Love track listing
No.	Title	Length
1.	"Hit My Head All Day"	6:03
2.	"Cruise Ship Designer"	2:29
3.	"My Soul / Half Pint"	3:57
4.	"Secret Love (Concealed in a Drawing of a Boy)"	3:21
5.	"Let Me Grow and You'll See the Fruit"	3:09
6.	"Blood"	3:23
7.	"Evil Evil Idiot"	3:59
8.	"Rocks"	2:59
9.	"The Cute Things"	4:15
10.	"I Need You"	4:33
11.	"Joy"	2:53
Total length:		41:01

Deluxe edition bonus tracks
No.	Title	Length
12.	"Sliced by a Fingernail"	4:08
13.	"Grass"	3:22
14.	"I Have the Key"	4:55
Total length:		53:26

== Personnel ==
Credits for the original album are adapted from the vinyl liner notes; credits for the deluxe edition bonus tracks are adapted from Apple Music.

=== Dry Cleaning ===
- Nick Buxton – percussion (1–4, 6, 9–11, 13, 14), backing vocals (1, 2, 6, 11), programmed drums (1, 4, 6–9), synthesiser (1, 4, 9, 14), drums (except 1), keyboards (2, 6, 7, 13), piano (3, 5, 9), programming (12), vocals (12)
- Tom Dowse – guitar (all tracks), backing vocals (1, 2, 6, 11), mandolin (4), synthesiser (10), vocals (12)
- Lewis Maynard – bass (all tracks), backing vocals (1, 2, 6, 11), vocals (12)
- Florence Shaw – vocals (all tracks), backing vocals (1, 5, 6, 11), synthesiser (10)

=== Additional musicians ===
- Cate Le Bon – programmed drums (1, 2, 6–10), synthesiser (4, 10, 11), programming (12)
- Euan Hinshelwood – alto saxophone (3, 13)
- Jeff Tweedy – guitar (3)
- Bruce Lamont – tenor saxophone (5, 14)
- Stephen Black – bass clarinet (10, 12)

=== Technical and design ===
- Cate Le Bon – production (all tracks)
- Samur Khouja – engineering (all tracks)
- Euan Hinshelwood, Tom Schick – additional engineering (1–11)
- David Wrench – mixing (all tracks)
- Heba Kadry – mastering (all tracks)
- Erica Eyres – cover artwork
- Alan Duggan, Daniel Fox – additional arrangement (6, 7)
- Margo Broom – additional arrangement (8)
- Erica Eyres – artwork
- PG Howlin' Studio – design

== Charts ==
Chart performance for Secret Love
Chart (2026)	Peak position
Australian Albums (ARIA)	34
Belgian Albums (Ultratop Flanders)	101
Dutch Vinyl Albums (Dutch Charts)	19
German Albums (Offizielle Top 100)	47
German Rock & Metal Albums (Offizielle Top 100)	17
Irish Independent Albums (IRMA)	18
New Zealand Albums (RMNZ)	28
Portuguese Albums (AFP)	116
Scottish Albums (OCC)	4
UK Albums (OCC)	12
UK Independent Albums (OCC)	3
US Top Album Sales (Billboard)	32
