= Die to Wake Up from a Dream =

Studio album by MF Tomlinson
- Released: 11 July 2025
- Length: 63:58
- Label: PRAH
- Producer: MF Tomlinson

MF Tomlinson chronology
| We Are Still Wild Horses (2023) | Die to Wake Up from a Dream (2025) |

Singles from Die to Wake Up from a Dream
- 1. "Die to Wake Up from a Dream" Released: 24 March 2025

Die to Wake Up from a Dream is a studio album by London-based Australian musician MF Tomlinson. It was released on 11 July 2025 via PRAH.

== Background ==
Die to Wake Up from a Dream is the third release from a trilogy by Tomlinson, composed of self-produced albums "exploring memory, hope, and the subconscious". It encompasses elements of art rock and shoegaze.

The title track was released as the lead single on 24 March 2025. Tomlinson described it as "a treatise on resilience, hope and the frankly wildly psychedelic experience of being alive."

== Reception ==
Professional ratings
Review scores
| Source | Rating |
|---|---|
| God Is in the TV | 9/10 |
| The Line of Best Fit | 7/10 |
| Spill Magazine | 4.5/5 stars |

Ed Jupp of God Is in the TV described the album as "phenomenal" and "ultra-widescreen", noting "It's dreamlike – but then not all dreams are good ones; parts of this record are pretty nightmarish." Spill's Ljubinko Zivkovic remarked, "This time around, he brings in some of the best elements of the Aussie greats that were the Go-Betweens and the Triffids."

The album received a 7/10 rating from the Line of Best Fit, whose reviewer Christopher Hamilton-Peach noted it as "undeniably idiosyncratic in intention" and "torn between competing openness and oppressive pressure, with symmetry and discord revolving in a feverish subconscious world."

== Track listing ==
All tracks are written by Michael Tomlinson; "Blink and You'll Miss It" written with Gary Barber.

Die to Wake Up from a Dream track listing
| No. | Title | Length |
|---|---|---|
| 1. | "Blink and You'll Miss It" | 4:57 |
| 2. | "My Hand in Yours" | 5:36 |
| 3. | "A Dream" | 5:59 |
| 4. | "Die to Wake Up from a Dream" | 9:22 |
| 5. | "Your Flight (Dying/Another Dream)" (featuring Florence Shaw) | 8:53 |
| 6. | "Dream of You" | 5:10 |
| 7. | "I'm on the Border" | 4:52 |
| 8. | "A Meadow Part I" | 4:44 |
| 9. | "A Meadow Part II" | 14:25 |
| Total length: | | 63:58 |

== Personnel ==
Credits adapted from Tidal.

- MF Tomlinson – vocals, production
- Tom Andrews – mixing (all tracks), synthesizer (track 1)
- Guy Davie – mastering
- Benjamin Manning – bass
- Craig Grimshaw – drums
- Gail Tasker – flute
- Connie Chatwin – background vocals (1, 2), violin (7, 9)
- Alistair Welsh – trombone (1, 5, 8), background vocals (3, 4)
- Kayvon Nabijou – saxophone (1, 6), piano (3, 4, 7, 9)
- Jacken Elswyth – banjo (2, 8, 9)
- Freddie Willets – lap steel guitar (2, 8, 9)
- Jy-Perry Banks – pedal steel guitar (2)
- Alex MacKenzie – synthesizer (4, 7)
- Jamie Wall – trumpet (4, 9)
- Barnaby Slade – tuba (5, 8, 9)
- Holly Carpenter – violin (5)
- Florence Shaw – vocals (5)
- Emily Connor – cello (7)
- Michael Evans – French horn (8)
