= Sigga Björg Sigurðardóttir =

Icelandic artist (born 1977)

Sigga Björg Sigurðardóttir (born 1977) is an Icelandic artist.

She was born in Reykjavík, studied at the Iceland Academy of the Arts and went on to receive a MFA from the Glasgow School of Art. She has had solo exhibitions in Reykjavík, Frankfurt, New York City and Montreal and participated in group exhibitions at the Gothenburg Art Museum, the Centre for Contemporary Arts in Glasgow and the Reykjavík Art Museum.

She works with drawing, painting, sculpture and animation. Her art evokes a mythical world infused with both humour and wildness. Her figures combine attributes of both humans and beasts. She also produced art for album covers for various artists including Jónsi, Sigur Rós and Alex Somers. In 2014, she collaborated with Erica Eyres in an installation at the Listasafn ASÍ art museum called Sniffer.

Her work is held in collections around the world including the Zabludowicz Art Trust in London, the Nordic Watercolour Museum in Sweden, the Kunsthaus Zürich in Switzerland and the Reykjavík Art Museum.
