= Don't Press Me =

Single by Dry Cleaning

from the album Stumpwork
- B-side: "Swampy"
- Released: 14 June 2022
- Recorded: October and December 2021
- Studio: Rockfield (Monmouthshire, Wales); J&J (Bristol, England)
- Genre: Post-punk
- Length: 1:50
- Label: 4AD
- Composer: Dry Cleaning
- Lyricist: Florence Shaw
- Producer: John Parish

Dry Cleaning singles chronology
"Bug Eggs/Tony Speaks!" (2021)	"Don't Press Me" (2022)	"Anna Calls from the Arctic" (2022)

Audio sample
- file; help

Music video
- "Don't Press Me" on YouTube

"Don't Press Me" is a song by the English post-punk band Dry Cleaning, released on 14 June 2022 as the lead single to their second album Stumpwork (2022). It was produced by John Parish.

== Recording and composition ==
Produced by John Parish, the song was recorded at Rockfield Studios in Wales and J&J Studios in Bristol in October and December 2021, then mixed at Playpen Studios in February 2022 and mastered at Loud Mastering the following month. The music consists of a post-punk backing supplemented with handclaps, keyboards, strummed acoustic guitars, and whistling (the latter by guitarist Tom Dowse).

Whereas the band composed the music, the lyrics were written by the vocalist Florence Shaw. On the verses, she warns the listener not to touch her gaming mouse, then on the chorus, her vocals—sung from the perspective of speaking with her own brain—include lines such as "You are always fighting me" and the title. Rather than repeating the chorus after the next verse, the song continues with a guitar solo from Dowse and ends before the song is able to total two minutes.

== Release and music video ==
"Don't Press Me" was released on 14 June 2022 as the lead single to their forthcoming album Stumpwork. It was accompanied by a music video animated by Peter Millard, described in Pitchfork as "cartoon versions of the band's faces rolling around like bouncy balls." The B-side to the vinyl single was "Swampy", an outtake from the Stumpwork sessions. The non-album track was later re-released as the lead single (along with "Sombre Two", another outtake) to their 2023 extended play Swampy.

== Reception ==
In a review for Pitchfork, Jayson Greene said that "It's a testament to Shaw's flat anti-charisma and her chemistry with the band that she continues to make anomie this catchy, appealing, and funny." In Paste, "Don't Press Me" was ranked at no. 33 on their list of The 50 Best Songs of 2022. The website's Scott Russell called the track "Exhibit A in support of Dry Cleaning’s newfound self-assurance", saying that it subverted their expectations twice despite its short length and its similarities to their previous material. Ben Hozie of the American rock band Bodega said that "the abridged arrangement makes the track both enigmatic and endless [sic] replay-able", including it as one of his favourite songs of the year.

== Track listing ==
"Don't Press Me" 7-inch vinyl track listing
No.	Title	Length
1.	"Don't Press Me"	1:50
2.	"Swampy"	3:33

== Personnel ==
Except where noted, musical credits are adapted from Tidal; technical and design credits are adapted from the 7-inch vinyl notes,

=== Dry Cleaning ===
- Nick Buxton – drums
- Tom Dowse – electric guitar, whistling
- Lewis Maynard – bass
- Florence Shaw – vocals

=== Technical and design ===
- John Parish – production; mixing at Playpen, Bristol
- Joe Jones – engineering at Rockfield, Wales
- Oliver Baldwin – engineering at J&J, Bristol
- Ali Chant – mixing at Playpen, Bristol
- Jason Mitchell – mastering at Loud
- Rottingdean Bazaar – artwork, design, creative direction
- Annie Collinge – artwork, design, photography
- Claire Huss – graphic design
