= Erica Eyres =

Canadian artist

Erica Eyres (born 1980) is a Canadian artist who lives and works in Glasgow.

== Biography ==
Eyres was born in Winnipeg and received a BFA from the University of Manitoba and a MFA from the Glasgow School of Art. In her art, she works with videos, drawings, sculptures and ceramics. Eyres has had solo exhibitions in London, in Winnipeg, in Glasgow at the Centre for Contemporary Arts and in Germany at the Kunsthaus Erfurt. Her work was also shown at the Swab Contemporary Art Show in Barcelona in 2008 and at the Akureyri Art Museum in Iceland.

She produced a series of drawings based on studio photographs which were taken by her father during the 1970s. In 2012, she developed a video which reconstructed an episode of the television show Dallas using Scottish children as actors. In 2014, she collaborated with Icelandic artist Sigga Björg Sigurðardóttir in an installation at the Listasafn ASÍ art museum called Sniffer. Her work can be both humorous and unsettling.

She was nominated for a Beck's Futures award in 2006. In the same year, she received a Dewar Arts Award. In 2017, she appeared on the long list for a Sobey Art Award.
