= Bills & Aches & Blues =

Compilation album by 4AD
- Released: 2 April 2021
- Length: 72:42
- Label: 4AD

Bills & Aches & Blues is a compilation album by UK record label 4AD. Released digitally on 2 April 2021, the 18-track album consists of various 4AD artists covering songs by other bands from the label's history, including the Birthday Party, Grimes, and the Breeders.

== Background ==
The album was first announced 10 March 2021, alongside the release of five singles: Tkay Maidza covering Pixies' "Where Is My Mind?", U.S. Girls covering the Birthday Party's "Junkyard", Aldous Harding covering Deerhunter's "Revival", the Breeders covering His Name Is Alive's "The Dirt Eaters", and Maria Somerville covering Air Miami's "Seabird". Digital copies were set to release 2 April, with CD and standard vinyl releases out 23 July and a deluxe vinyl boxset set for later in 2021. 4AD also announced that the first 12 months of profit will be donated to The Harmony Project. The album's title comes from a lyric in the Cocteau Twins song "Cherry-Coloured Funk".

== Reception ==
Bills & Aches & Blues ratings
Review scores
Source	Rating
Clash	6/10
Pitchfork	6.9/10

Pitchfork's Marc Hogan wrote that "At its best, Bills & Aches & Blues presents beloved and lesser-known artists from the label's roster unearthing hidden gems with the same adventurous, borderless spirit that has cemented 4AD's status as a pioneering indie institution. Yet, especially in the form available on streaming services—four separate, side-long EPs—the compilation often feels like less than the sum of its parts", and that the album "is a frequently impressive assemblage of extraordinary artists running amok through a trove of extraordinary songs, with occasionally uneven results." Clash's Sam Walker-Smart stated that "Wisely the powers that be have opted to let current artists cover some of their favourite tracks from the 4AD vaults; unwisely, they don't seem to have curated it too well", and that "18 songs, truth be told, is not that much room to celebrate four decades of groundbreaking work, and even less so when some artists are given double doses of love", finishing by calling the album "a wasted opportunity". Mxdwn.com's Grace Galarraga wrote "The great part about this album (and covers in general) is that you can hear a piece of each artist's musical identity in their rendition of each song", and called the album "a fabulous agglomeration celebrating the art of indie music and the amazing artists under the 4AD label."

== Track listing ==
Bills & Aches & Blues
No.	Title	Covering artist	Length
1.	"Where Is My Mind?" (Pixies)	Tkay Maidza	2:57
2.	"Junkyard" (The Birthday Party)	U.S. Girls	2:59
3.	"Revival" (Deerhunter)	Aldous Harding	2:17
4.	"The Dirt Eaters" (His Name Is Alive)	The Breeders	3:34
5.	"Seabird" (Air Miami)	Maria Somerville	4:36
6.	"Cannonball" (The Breeders)	Tune-Yards	3:09
7.	"Genesis" (Grimes)	Spencer.	4:29
8.	"Futurism" (Deerhunter)	Helado Negro	3:10
9.	"Postal" (Piano Magic)	Efterklang	4:00
10.	"Gigantic" (Pixies)	Bing and Ruth	5:26
11.	"The Moon Is Blue" (Colourbox)	Future Islands	4:38
12.	"Sunbathing" (Lush)	Jenny Hval	2:46
13.	"Oblivion" (Grimes)	Dry Cleaning	3:50
14.	"Mountain Battles" (The Breeders)	Bradford Cox	6:24
15.	"Song to the Siren" (Tim Buckley)	SOHN	4:45
16.	"The Wolves (Act I and II)" (Bon Iver)	Becky and the Birds	4:30
17.	"Misery Is a Butterfly" (Blonde Redhead)	Ex:Re	5:08
18.	"Off You" (The Breeders)	Big Thief	4:04
Total length:			72:42
