= New Long Leg =

Studio album by Dry Cleaning
- Released: 2 April 2021
- Recorded: July–August 2020
- Studios: Rockfield (Monmouthshire, Wales)
- Genres: Post-punk; spoken word
- Length: 41:58
- Label: 4AD
- Producer: John Parish

Dry Cleaning chronology
Boundary Road Snacks and Drinks (2019)	New Long Leg (2021)	Tascam Tapes (2021)

Singles from New Long Leg
- 1. "Scratchcard Lanyard" Released: 19 November 2020; 2. "Strong Feelings" Released: 9 February 2021; 3. "Unsmart Lady" Released: 30 March 2021

New Long Leg is the debut studio album by the English post-punk band Dry Cleaning, released on 2 April 2021 through the independent label 4AD. It was recorded with producer John Parish between lockdowns during the COVID-19 pandemic, after having to postpone their tour in support of their EPs, Sweet Princess (2018) and Boundary Road Snacks and Drinks (2019).

Largely retaining Florence Shaw's spoken word delivery and the post-punk style of their previous material, New Long Leg sees Shaw beginning to transition away from found texts in favour of her own written material and observations, while the band prioritised a groove-oriented sound and incorporated drum machines. It was widely acclaimed upon release and placed on several year-end lists, and it reached no. 4 on the UK Albums Chart.

== Background and recording ==
In 2020, Dry Cleaning were on tour supporting their EPs Sweet Princess (2018) and Boundary Road Snacks and Drinks (2019). By early March, the band announced that they had signed to the independent record label 4AD, band members Florence Shaw and Tom Dowse quit their jobs as lecturers, and Dry Cleaning had just begun the North American leg of the tour, holding their American debut at clubs in Brooklyn, New York City. Shortly afterwards, however, the incoming COVID-19 pandemic caused scheduled venues to cancel, so the band returned to London. By that point, much of the material for what would become New Long Leg was already written and demoed, so the remainder was written during pandemic lockdown, passing around a TASCAM cassette Portastudio to record further demos and using that time to experiment and refine the lyrics. They began rehearsing together nearly two months later under social distancing conditions and later recorded the album in the summer with producer John Parish at Rockfield Studios in rural Wales, managing all of this between lockdowns. The recording sessions finished within a two-week period between July and August.

== Composition ==
=== Style ===
New Long Leg, like Dry Cleaning's previous material, has been predominantly described as a post-punk album accompanied by Florence Shaw's spoken word vocals. The band has cited several influences such as Augustus Pablo and the soundtracks for the video games Hotline Miami and Streets of Rage. Shaw has cited Bjork for her lyrics, and bassist Lewis Maynard has cited Led Zeppelin, Vol. 4 (1972) by Black Sabbath, and Errol Holt's bass work on Dub to Africa (1979) by Prince Far I & the Arabs. Drummer Nick Buxton incorporated drum machines, specifically "a Roland TR8 routed through a Moogerfrooger [sic] MURF filter."

"Strong Feelings"
The introduction to "Strong Feelings" which mixes live drums and drum machines.

"Every Day Carry"
On "Every Day Carry", an instrumental pause with loop pedals and feedback from guitarist Tom Dowse transitions to a climax with the rest of the band.

Upon the album's release, reviewers have often found similarities to a number of post-punk groups such as the Fall, Gang of Four, and Magazine, with additional comparisons to Sonic Youth, Life Without Buildings, and the Smiths. Charlie Brock of Gigwise singled out the "jangly guitar" on "Her Hippo" as being highly reminiscent of Smiths guitarist Johnny Marr. The seven-minute psychedelic closer "Every Day Carry" heavily utilises guitar feedback during a two-minute-long instrumental pause. Otherwise, New Long Leg prioritises a groove-oriented approach. Although Shaw's deadpan, stream of consciousness-styled vocal performance on New Long Leg primarily relies on spoken word, she occasionally breaks that pattern to briefly sing, for example, on the title track and "More Big Birds".

=== Themes and lyrics ===
In a departure from Shaw's previous methodology of reciting from an assortment of found text, much of the lyrics on the album also came from overheard conversations and her own writing. Describing her writing process in an interview in Rolling Stone, she said she would dive into various topics that came to mind, ranging from baked beans to Star Trek: The Next Generation. On New Long Leg, Shaw glorifies everyday, mundane activities while offering criticisms of the modern world. These subjects are often delivered in a humorous manner and are transitioned together in quick succession via the use of non-sequitors, often about food. Altogether this culminates in a tone that is often perceived as surrealist, absurdist, or escapist.

== Singles ==
On 19 November 2020, Dry Cleaning released their lead single and debut on 4AD, "Scratchcard Lanyard". It was accompanied by a music video by Rottingdean Bazaar, a duo consisting of James Theseus Buck and Luke Brooks; along with Annie Collinge, they would later receive a Grammy as art directors for the packaging of the band's second album Stumpwork (2022). The video prominently features Shaw performing at a miniature venue wherein her face comprises the entire stage, occasionally zooming out to show the rest of the band playing along. The largely upbeat single was often played on 6Music. Jim Wirth of Uncut considered it Dry Cleaning's "signature tune", and in American Songwriter, Hal Horowitz argued that it is representative of the band's "distinctive blueprint." In "Scratchcard Lanyard", the narrator seeks out various creative outlets in order to provide a sense of self-worth. Shaw has described it as a revenge fantasy, providing context in Rolling Stone about "feeling quite pissed-off and fatigued" with expectations placed upon women past thirty years old, such as the pressure to have children.

Coinciding with the announcement for the album, the band revealed the second single, "Strong Feelings", on 9 February 2021. The music video was directed by the band's guitarist Tom Dowse and features glitch art from Sabato Visconti. The track includes lyrics such as descriptions of paintings and the line "Just an emo dead stuff collector, things come to the brain," which was noted by Kate French-Morris in The Forty-Five as a potential self-descriptor by Shaw. "Strong Feelings" was later used during an Haute couture runway show by Chanel.

After covering Grimes' "Oblivion" for the third installment of a compilation album by 4AD entitled Bills & Aches & Blues on 25 March, Dry Cleaning released the third single, "Unsmart Lady", on 30 March. The music video was directed by Tilly Shiner and was filmed in Dourofs, a carpet warehouse in Catford, London. Lyrically, it addresses expectations that people have of women in the modern world. Shaw explained that the track's writing took inspiration from things meant to shame appearance, but instead using them in a "powerful" way.

== Release ==
New Long Leg was released on 2 April 2021. It peaked on both the UK and Scottish Albums Charts at no. 4, additionally reaching no. 1 on the UK Independent Albums Chart. The Japanese version of New Long Leg contained two bonus tracks, "Tony Speaks!" and "Bug Eggs", that were recorded during the sessions for the album. Both were released together as a double A-side single later on 17 July.

=== Tascam Tapes ===
After receiving the distinction of album of the year from Rough Trade, the band released a 12-inch vinyl EP in November 2021 entitled Tascam Tapes, exclusively through the retailer. It consisted of four-track demos of songs from New Long Leg. On 18 November, free tickets to a Dry Cleaning concert at the Rainbow Room in Rockefeller Center, New York City were available to purchasers of the record. The opening act was the Muckers, followed by Spencer, a fellow artist on 4AD.

== Critical reception ==
Professional ratings
Aggregate scores
Source	Rating
AnyDecentMusic?	8.1/10
Metacritic	86/100
Review scores
Source	Rating
AllMusic	4/5 stars
Clash	8/10
Exclaim!	9/10
The Guardian	4/5 stars
MusicOMH	4.5/5 stars
NME	4/5 stars
Paste	8.2/10
Pitchfork	8.6/10
The Telegraph	4/5 stars
Under the Radar	8/10

New Long Leg was critically acclaimed upon release. According to the review aggregator Metacritic, New Long Leg received "universal acclaim" based on a weighted average score of 86 out of 100 from 21 critic scores. Another aggregator, AnyDecentMusic?, gave it an average rating of 8.1 out of 10, based on 24 critic scores.

Rating the album 9 out of 10 for the website Exclaim!, Kaelen Bell called it "a bristling and steely-eyed statement of intent ... New Long Leg is an even-keeled record, and the quartet remain at a confident simmer for the length of its 40 minutes." In a similarly positive review, Matt Cotsell said in MusicOMH "this precariously magnetic album ... will absolutely floor you." In a pair of four star magazine reviews, Shaun Curran of Record Collector described New Long Leg as "Fresh, clever", "endlessly intriguing," and "a stellar debut", while Victoria Segal of Mojo considered it "Comic, sinister, [and] suddenly moving". In a five star review at The Arts Desk, Katie Colombus felt that the record's lyrics possess a "mundane beauty", adding "What I love about New Long Leg is its insistence to look for the finer detail in all that we could miss out on, and to see that there is magic everywhere – even in the most ordinary places." Feeling the need to provide comparable praise to the album's instrumentals, Sean Kerwick of DIY opined that "While the lyrics certainly take centre stage, the instrumentals that run beneath the vocals are equally inspired without employing the use of too many bells and whistles." On the website The Forty-Five, Kate French-Morris said that the band's artistry was built on Shaw, flourishing her vocals, contrasting sounds and moods without clashing, and containing "layers that wriggle behind her blunt manner."

In comparison to Dry Cleaning's previous material, i.e. the well-received EPs Sweet Princess (2018) and Boundary Road Snacks and Drinks (2019), critics generally found New Long Leg to be an improvement in various ways. Rosie Ramsden of Loud and Quiet called it "a record of greater confidence and refinement", Max Freedman of Paste thought it was "levels funnier, wryer and more melodic", and Jill Mapes of Pitchfork felt that "the album's production and mix are exquisitely calibrated for maximum effect" in contrast to their "scrappier EPs". In a review for The Skinny, Skye Butchard believed that the instrumental trio "are looser and more explorative players" on New Long Leg, following the "taut energy" of the band's early EPs, crediting "the impressionistic guitar lines and lolloping drums" that amplified "More Big Birds" and "Unsmart Lady" as a better meld with Shaw's performance. As said by Dom Gourlay in Under the Radar, "Fulfilling all the promise shown by those early releases not to mention 4AD's faith in signing them up, Dry Cleaning are the real deal." In a similar vein, Will Schube of Flood Magazine said "as is too rarely the case, New Long Leg lives up to the hype and builds upon it, imagining a future in which a new crop of bands long to mimic their style."

Multiple critics lauded New Long Leg as unique. Although Gabbie Nirenburg of No Ripcord found it "unavoidable" to separate the music from the post-punk genre, they nonetheless found the record to be "cohesive and original." Other reviewers found that it stood out in the contemporary post-punk scene in particular. Robin Murray of Clash called Shaw's delivery "a unique sonic weapon"; moreover, they said that on New Long Leg the band "have a commitment to a singular aesthetic that their peers lack ... it takes chances other groups could scarcely envisage." In a review for the NME, Will Richard stated that while the album bears some similarities to modern post-punk bands that engage in the trend of utilising spoken word, "the band also sit apart due to their more playful subject matter and brilliant refusal to take themselves too seriously; it's something the modern punk scene is crying out for." Tim Sentz, a critic writing for Beats Per Minute, thought that Shaw's unconventional background in visual arts brought "some freshness to a scene that is overstuffed at the moment," describing Shaw as talented and the backing as the key to Dry Cleaning's success, making New Long Leg sound "sunnier than its brethren."

At least two tracks from the album garnered specific attention by critics. Heather Phares said in a review for AllMusic that "Scratchcard Lanyard" is "one of New Long Leg's finest moments". In Loud and Quiet, Rosie Ramsden said that "Here, triviality and meaning compete to create a compelling portrait of ordinary life, one littered with acerbic wit, intricacy and yawning negative space. Nowhere is this demonstrated better than on the album's opener, 'Scratchcard Lanyard'". Elsewhere, Ross Horton of The Line of Best Fit believed that Shaw's lyrics on closer "Every Day Carry" are "most representative of her craft," such that she "lets loose with some of the most impressively impressionistic poetic zingers that you're likely to ever hear on record this year." In an otherwise positive review, Michael Hann of The Guardian said of the track that "It's a shame, then, that her best lyric ... is married to the least interesting music of the record, seven-and-a-half minutes that one suspects are meant to be hypnotic and probably are – live." "Conversely, Jamie MacMillan in Dork magazine said that once the album progressed to its final track "Every Day Carry", they "cemented their place as one of the most fascinating bands out there." Charlie Brock of Gigwise considered "Every Day Carry" to be the strongest track, concluding in a 9 out of 10 review that it is "an incredibly strong closer to an incredibly strong album."

=== Year-end lists ===
Publication	List	Rank	Ref.
The Atlantic	The 10 Best Albums of 2021	1	
Clash	Albums of the Year 2021	26	
Consequence	Top 50 Albums of 2021	17	
DIY	Best Albums of 2021	3	
Exclaim!	50 Best Albums of 2021	49	
The Guardian	The 50 Best Albums of 2021	7	
Les Inrockuptibles	Top 50 Albums of 2021	15	
Loud and Quiet	Albums of the Year 2021	10	
NME	The 50 Best Albums of 2021	43	
Paste	The 50 Best Albums of 2021	7	
Pitchfork	The 50 Best Albums of 2021	10	
The Quietus	Albums of the Year 2021	41	
Resident Records	Albums of the Year 2021	1	
Rolling Stone	The 50 Best Albums of 2021	24	
Rough Trade UK	Albums of the Year 2021	1	
Slant	The 50 Best Albums of 2021	38	
Spin	The 30 Best Albums of 2021	7	
Under the Radar	Top 100 Albums of 2021	4	

== Track listing ==
All lyrics are written by Florence Shaw; all music is composed by Lewis Maynard, Nick Buxton, and Tom Dowse.

Standard track listing
No.	Title	Length
1.	"Scratchcard Lanyard"	4:07
2.	"Unsmart Lady"	3:02
3.	"Strong Feelings"	4:05
4.	"Leafy"	3:09
5.	"Her Hippo"	4:38
6.	"New Long Leg"	4:13
7.	"John Wick"	3:26
8.	"More Big Birds"	4:08
9.	"A.L.C"	3:10
10.	"Every Day Carry"	7:39
Total length:		41:58

Japanese edition bonus tracks
No.	Title	Length
11.	"Tony Speaks!"	5:16
12.	"Bug Eggs"	3:21
Total length:		50:35

== Personnel ==
Credits are adapted from the CD liner notes of New Long Leg.

Dry Cleaning

- Florence Shaw – vocals, melodica
- Lewis Maynard – bass
- Tom Dowse – guitar, piano, keyboards, piano, percussion
- Nick Buxton – drums, percussion, keyboards, synthesisers, drum programming (Roland TR-8)

Technical personnel and additional musicians

- John Parish – production, mixing, percussion (3, 5), synthesiser (3, 10), piano (5), keyboards (7)
- Joe Jones – engineering, field recording (7)
- Stu Matthews – engineering
- Jason Mitchell – mastering

Design

- Dry Cleaning – artwork, design
- Alison Fielding – design assistance
- Florence Shaw – photography
- Ray Collins Enterprises – stills from Building a Road from the Ground Up

== Charts ==
Chart performance for New Long Leg
Chart (2021)	Peak position
Belgian Albums (Ultratop Flanders)	67
German Albums (Offizielle Top 100)	85
Irish Albums (OCC)	45
Portuguese Albums (AFP)	26
Scottish Albums (OCC)	4
UK Albums (OCC)	4
UK Independent Albums (OCC)	1
US Heatseekers Albums (Billboard)	16
US Top Album Sales (Billboard)	60
