= Sweet Princess =

EP by Dry Cleaning
- Released: September 2018 (no label)
- Recorded: March 2018
- Studio: Total Refreshment Centre, London
- Genre: Post-punk; spoken word
- Length: 21:21
- Label: It's OK
- Producer: Kristian Craig Robinson

Dry Cleaning chronology
Sweet Princess (2018)	Boundary Road Snacks and Drinks (2019)

Singles from Sweet Princess
- 1. "Magic of Meghan" Released: July 2019; 2. "Goodnight" Released: August 2019

Sweet Princess is the debut extended play by the English post-punk band Dry Cleaning. It was originally self-released on Bandcamp and SoundCloud in September 2018, then later on 16 August 2019 on the band's label, It's OK. The EP was produced by Kristian Craig Robinson.

== Background and style ==
In 2017, Lewis Maynard, Tom Dowse, and Nick Buxton, writing music as an instrumental group, sought to bring their friend Florence Shaw on vocals. Initially, she was uninclined to front a band because she had recently gone through "a fairly devastating breakup", but Shaw later agreed to partake in a rehearsal session with the trio. Sweet Princess was recorded in a single day in March 2018, and, notably, the full lineup of the band had never performed on stage until the following May.

With Shaw on spoken-word vocals reminiscent of artists such as Patti Smith and Mark E. Smith, Sweet Princess has been often categorized as post-punk, more so after the release of their first full-length album New Long Leg in 2021, which was described on the website Pitchfork as a record that incorporated "a whole new swath of influences" besides post-punk. In comparison to its successor Boundary Road Snacks and Drinks from October 2019, Heather Phares of AllMusic called Sweet Princess "a more primal take on their distinctive viewpoint", and Shaw's vocals were similarly noted in Spectrum Culture for their relative "aggressiveness".

== Promotion, singles, and release ==
Sweet Princess was originally self-released in September 2018 on Bandcamp and SoundCloud. Later in July 2019, Dry Cleaning released the lead single, "Magic of Meghan", alongside a music video by Lucy Vann and the announcement for a wider release of the EP. The song, whose title refers to Meghan Markle, addresses the public scrutiny Markle faced as a result of her highly publicized marriage with Prince Harry, Duke of Sussex. Shaw later elaborated that "I had just broken up, and I was clinging to that story to distract myself from the abyss," adding "I was really disturbed by how she was written about, how bold some of the racism was in the British press". The band also released the track "Goodnight" as the second single in August 2019.

While on tour supporting Sweet Princess and Boundary Road... in early March 2020, Dry Cleaning made their first live appearances in America at the Brooklyn, New York clubs Saint Vitus and Union Pool, but fears surrounding the incoming coronavirus pandemic caused venues and festivals such as the SXSW Music Festival to cancel appearances. The group was forced to relocate back to the UK for the duration of the pandemic, spending that time to record material for what ultimately became New Long Leg. Dry Cleaning would later have a reason to go back on tour for their early material in 2024 when 4AD reissued a compilation containing both EPs.

== Re-releases ==
Sweet Princess was re-released on the It's OK label on 16 August 2019, but did not chart in the band's native UK; however, later in 2021, coinciding with the release of their album New Long Leg, it peaked at no. 83 on the UK Album Downloads Chart.

A compilation album containing both Sweet Princess and its successive EP Boundary Road Snacks and Drinks was released on 25 October 2019 on 12" vinyl, briefly entering the UK Independent Albums Chart for one week the following November at no. 36. Following Dry Cleaning's first two studio albums, New Long Leg (2021) and Stumpwork (2022), the band's label 4AD issued a remastered version of the double EP compilation on 8 March 2024, which peaked at no. 7 on the UK Independent Albums Chart and no. 17 on the Scottish Albums Chart. The Japanese CD of the compilation contained a bonus demo of "Strong Feelings" from New Long Leg.

== Critical reception ==
Professional ratings
Review scores
Source	Rating
Christgau's Consumer Guide	A
Pitchfork	7.8/10
The Sydney Morning Herald	4/5 stars
Uncut	8/10
Under the Radar	7.5/10

Rating Sweet Princess 7.8 out of 10 for the website Pitchfork, Brodie Lancaster described the EP as "six cerebral, spiky songs that extract something touching and tragic from the mundanity of social media and social anxiety." Critic Robert Christgau, rating Sweet Princess as an "A", called it "arrestingly angular up against spoken Florence Shaw lyrics". In a four star review for The Sydney Morning Herald, Bernard Zuel praised the "potent combination" of the band's instrumental work with Shaw's "spoken-word delivery and attitude", and Marty Hill of Under the Radar similarly spoke positively of the dynamic "between what the band are doing in the background and Shaw's often sarcastic and always sharp deliveries", concluding in a 7.5 out of 10 review that "As far as debuts go, you'd struggle to find a more exciting offering this year."

== Track listing ==
All lyrics are written by Florence Shaw; all music is composed by Dry Cleaning.

Sweet Princess track listing
No.	Title	Length
1.	"Goodnight"	2:37
2.	"New Job"	2:56
3.	"Magic of Meghan"	3:50
4.	"Traditional Fish"	4:06
5.	"Phone Scam"	3:05
6.	"Conversation"	4:47
Total length:		21:21

== Personnel ==
Credits are adapted from the 2024 CD notes of Boundary Road Snacks and Drinks & Sweet Princess and Tidal.

Dry Cleaning

- Nick Buxton – drums
- Florence Shaw – vocals
- Lewis Maynard – bass
- Tom Dowse – guitar

Technical

- Kristian Craig Robinson – production, engineering, recording
