= Boundary Road Snacks and Drinks =

EP by Dry Cleaning
- Released: 25 October 2019
- Recorded: June 2019
- Studio: Total Refreshment Centre, London
- Genre: Post-punk; spoken word
- Length: 21:02
- Label: It's OK
- Producer: Kristian Craig Robinson

Dry Cleaning chronology
Sweet Princess (2018)	Boundary Road Snacks and Drinks (2019)	New Long Leg (2021)

Singles from Boundary Road Snacks and Drinks
- 1. "Sit Down Meal" Released: 10 September 2019; 2. "Viking Hair" Released: 1 October 2019

Boundary Road Snacks and Drinks is the second extended play by the English post-punk band Dry Cleaning. It was released on 25 October 2019 on the band's personal label It's OK and was produced by Kristian Craig Robinson. The record is also their second EP after Sweet Princess (2018) to precede their first full-length studio album New Long Leg from 2021.

== Background, style, and title ==
Boundary Road Snacks and Drinks was recorded in June 2019 at the Total Refreshment Centre in London. This ostensibly was before the band's debut EP Sweet Princess had been released; in fact, Sweet Princess was originally self-released on Bandcamp and SoundCloud in 2018 to little publicity.

Boundary Road Snacks and Drinks, which got its title from the band's rehearsal space, has been often categorized as post-punk, more so after the release of their first full-length album New Long Leg in 2021, which was described on the website Pitchfork as a record that incorporated "a whole new swath of influences" besides post-punk. While the EP primarily tends towards spoken-word vocals, Florence Shaw, the band's vocalist, sings more often in comparison to Sweet Princess.

== Promotion and singles ==
Alongside the announcement for Boundary Road..., the lead single "Sit Down Meal" was released on 10 September 2019. The second single "Viking Hair" was released on 1 October 2019, accompanied by a music video which was shot and edited by members of the band and Pedro Pina at Cactus Club, an LGBT line dancing club in Clapham, London.

While on tour supporting Sweet Princess and Boundary Road... in early March 2020, Dry Cleaning made their first live appearances in America at the Brooklyn, New York clubs Saint Vitus and Union Pool, but fears surrounding the incoming coronavirus pandemic caused venues and festivals such as the SXSW Music Festival to cancel appearances. The group was forced to relocate back to the UK for the duration of the pandemic, spending that time to record material for what ultimately became New Long Leg. Dry Cleaning would later have a reason to go back on tour for their early material in 2024 when 4AD reissued a compilation containing both EPs.

== Releases ==
Boundary Road Snacks and Drinks was released on 25 October 2019. Like its predecessor Sweet Princess, it failed to chart in the UK. However, a compilation album containing both EPs was released on the same day on 12" vinyl, briefly entering the UK Independent Albums Chart for one week the following November at no. 36.

Following Dry Cleaning's first two studio albums, New Long Leg (2021) and Stumpwork (2022), the band's label 4AD issued a remastered version of the double EP compilation on 8 March 2024, which peaked at no. 7 on the UK Independent Albums Chart and no. 17 on the Scottish Albums Chart. Additionally, coinciding with the re-release of the compilation, Boundary Road... saw its first-ever issue on cassette; both the aforementioned cassette and the Japanese CD of the compilation contained a bonus demo of "Strong Feelings" from New Long Leg.

== Critical reception ==
Professional ratings
Review scores
Source	Rating
Christgau's Consumer Guide	(3-star Honorable Mention)
DIY	4/5 stars
Paste	8.2/10
Pitchfork	7.5/10
Uncut	7/10
Under the Radar	8/10

In a four star review for magazine DIY, Elly Watson felt that "the six-track newbie doesn’t disappoint following its predecessor's hype, albeit omitting any hotel carpet wonderings. Mixing their urgent post-punk backing with vocalist Florence Shaw's deadpan delivery, her spoken-word vocals remain the standout star here". Critic Robert Christgau was hesitant to give similar praise as with Sweet Princess, stating that Boundary Road... "sounds as if they may sometimes resort to semi-rejects or experiments gone slightly awry"; however, he ultimately gave the EP a three star honorable mention, defined as "an enjoyable effort consumers attuned to its overriding aesthetic or individual vision may well treasure." In contrast, Clare Martin said in an 8.2 out of 10 review for Paste that "The four-piece distinguish themselves... with jagged guitar riffs and Shaw’s singularly entrancing voice, showing a willingness to not just stretch outside of their comfort zone, but have a hell of a lot of fun doing it."

Colin Lodewick, in a 7.5 out of 10 review for Pitchfork, said "The relentless push of electric guitar and drums lends [Shaw's] words both a sense of confidence and the surreality of a film soundtrack. ... By treating language as a machine to be taken apart, Dry Cleaning crystallize experience with just a few images and turns of phrase." Rating the EP 8 out of 10, Michael James Hall of Under the Radar wrote that "It's this wondrous and simple-seeming clash of hefty, post punk with snarky sarcasm and stoic poetry that lifts the band out of the realms of the many soundalike new-New Wave UK bands and places them firmly in the territory of a band it's unwise to ignore."

== Track listing ==
All lyrics are written by Florence Shaw; all music is composed by Dry Cleaning.

Boundary Road Snacks and Drinks track listing
No.	Title	Length
1.	"Dog Proposal"	3:15
2.	"Viking Hair"	3:54
3.	"Spoils"	3:41
4.	"Jam After School"	2:20
5.	"Sombre One"	4:09
6.	"Sit Down Meal"	3:43
Total length:		21:02

2024 4AD remaster cassette
No.	Title	Length
7.	"Strong Feelings" (demo)

== Personnel ==
Credits are adapted from the 2024 CD notes of Boundary Road Snacks and Drinks & Sweet Princess and Tidal.

Dry Cleaning

- Nick Buxton – drums
- Florence Shaw – vocals
- Lewis Maynard – bass
- Tom Dowse – guitar

Technical

- Kristian Craig Robinson – production, engineering, recording
- Robin Schmidt – engineering
