= Florence Shaw =

English vocalist, lyricist, and artist

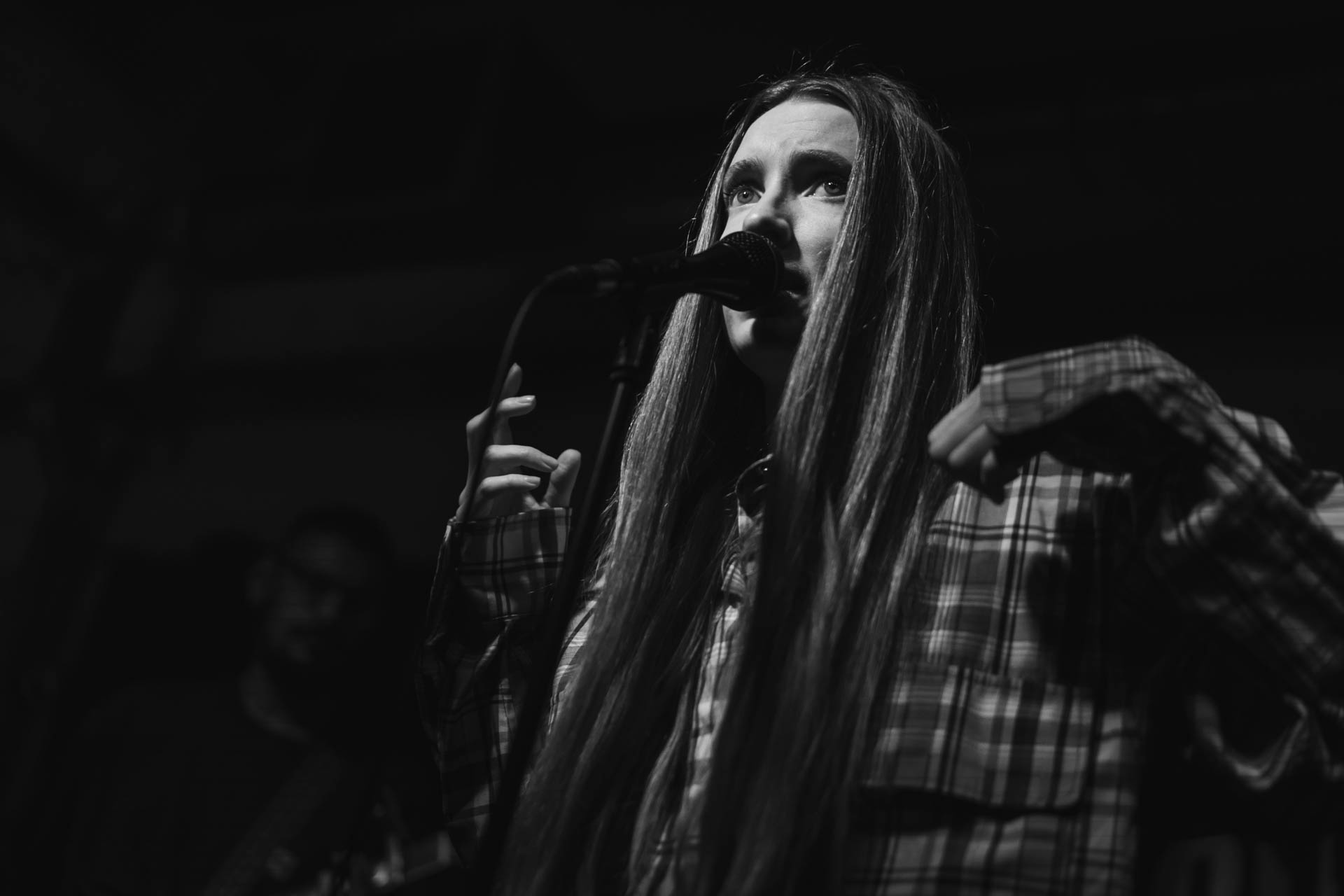
- Shaw performing with Dry Cleaning at Rough Trade, 2022
- Born: 1988 or 1989 (age 36–37)
- Education: Royal College of Art (MA)
- Occupations: Vocalist; lyricist; visual artist; arts lecturer (formerly)
- Years active: 2012–present
- Musical career
- Genres: Spoken word
- Years active: 2018–present
- Member of: Dry Cleaning

Florence Cleopatra Shaw is an English vocalist, lyricist, visual artist, and former arts lecturer. She is primarily known as the vocalist and lyricist for the post-punk band Dry Cleaning, with whom she has released three albums: New Long Leg (2021), Stumpwork (2022), and Secret Love (2026).

== Early life and education ==
Born to artist parents, Florence Cleopatra Shaw first pursued a degree in illustration at the Camberwell College of Arts. She later obtained a master's degree in visual communication at the Royal College of Art in 2012.

== Career ==
=== Music ===
==== Dry Cleaning ====
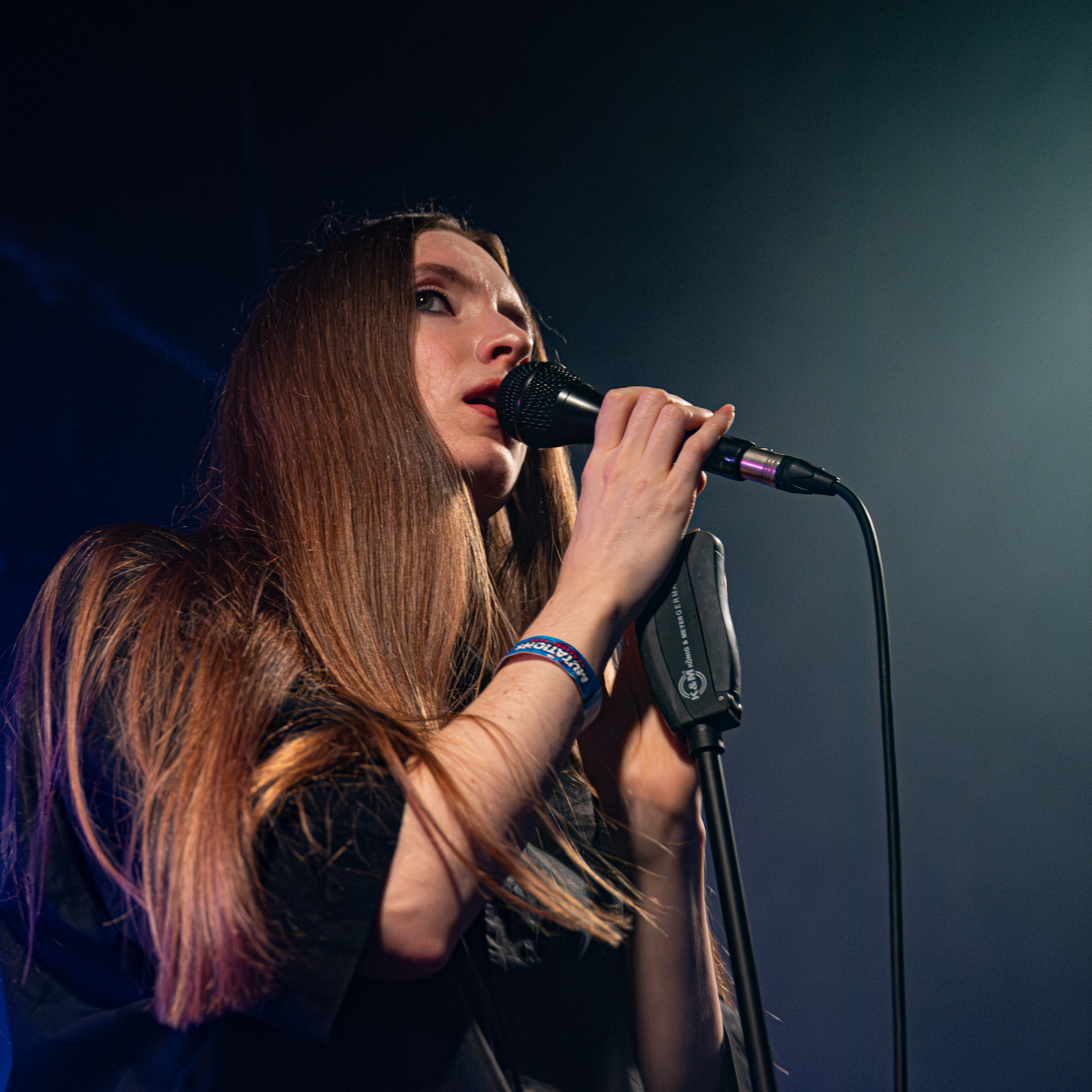
Shaw performing with Dry Cleaning at Mutations Festival, Brighton, 7 November 2025

Florence Shaw joined the London band Dry Cleaning in early 2018 as their vocalist and lyricist, after the other members of the band had invited her to sit in on a rehearsal session where she was recorded speaking alongside the instrumentals. In May 2018, Shaw performed live for the first time. Shaw's spoken word approach has been often described as conversational and deadpan. During an interview for The Quietus in 2019, responding to a question of whether the tone of her vocals is intended to evoke mystery, Shaw said:

It wasn't really a conscious decision, but looking back that's the reason why I made it, for want of a better word, deadpan ... I think it's interesting to not know things. I think lots of things are really cut and dried and packaged in a way where there's no discussion to be had about what the songs are about, who's singing, it's just totally a consumable product in a short space of time. It's nice to make things a bit unknowable.

Lyrically, she has often relied on a stream-of-consciousness approach that mixes humour, surrealism, and the mundane. By the band's second album Stumpwork (2022), Shaw began to source less of her lyrics from her own past writings and various assortments of found text to improvise more in the studio. For their third album, Secret Love (2026), her vocals shifted more towards a sung delivery.

==== Work outside Dry Cleaning ====
Occasionally, Shaw has featured on songs by other artists. In 2023, she appeared on the Sleaford Mods song "Force 10 from Navarone" from their album UK Grim. During an interview with the NME, Sleaford Mods' Jason Williamson said "I got to know her a little bit and I'm in total awe of how she creates this non-landscape; this empty portrait of whatever she's talking about. You don't even have to know what she's going on about, which is brilliant and I identify with."

=== Art and lecturing ===
Shaw used to be a visiting lecturer, teaching illustration at universities such as the University of Northampton and Norwich University of the Arts. In 2021, shortly before the worldwide COVID-19 pandemic lockdown, Shaw quit her lecturing job to focus on her role with Dry Cleaning, who had just signed to 4AD to release their debut album. One of Shaw's earliest works in art exhibitions includes a contribution for Happy Birthday Edward Lear (2012) at the Poetry Café in London.

== Discography ==
=== With Dry Cleaning ===
- Sweet Princess (2018, EP)
- Boundary Road Snacks and Drinks (2019, EP)
- New Long Leg (2021)
- Stumpwork (2022)
- Secret Love (2026)

=== As featured artist ===
- UK Grim by Sleaford Mods (2023) – "Force 10 from Navarone"
- Box by Honesty (2024) – "Boing" and "Genitile"
- Die to Wake Up from a Dream by MF Tomlinson (2025) – "Your Flight (Dying/Another Dream)"
