= Dry Cleaning (band) =

English post-punk band

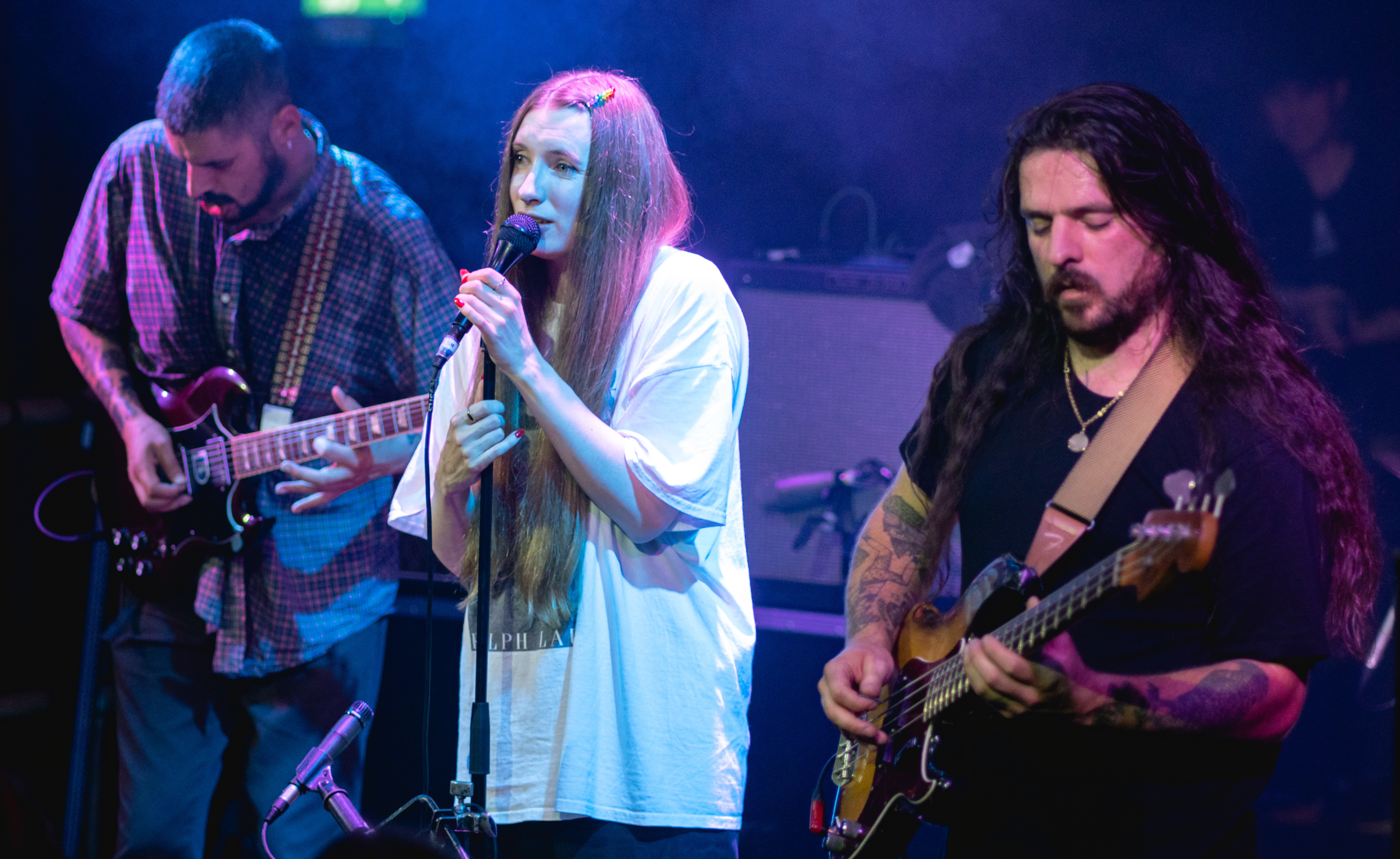
- Dry Cleaning performing at Pryzm Kingston on 2 September 2021. Left to right: Tom Dowse, Florence Shaw, Lewis Maynard, Nick Buxton (out of frame)

Background information
- Origin: South London, England
- Genres: Post-punk; spoken word
- Years active: 2017–present
- Labels: It's OK; 4AD
- Members: Florence Shaw; Lewis Maynard; Tom Dowse; Nick Buxton
- Website: drycleaningband.com

Dry Cleaning are an English post-punk band who formed in South London in 2017. The band is composed of vocalist Florence Shaw, guitarist Tom Dowse, bassist Lewis Maynard, and drummer Nick Buxton. They are noted for their use of spoken word primarily in lieu of sung vocals, as well as their unconventional lyrics. Their musical style has been compared to Wire, Magazine and Joy Division. They have been described as "Annette Peacock fronting the Fall or PiL or Siouxsie and the Banshees".

After releasing two EPs, the band's debut album, New Long Leg, was released in April 2021, followed by Stumpwork in October 2022 and Secret Love in January 2026.

== History ==
=== 2017–2019: Formation and early EPs ===
Before forming a band together in 2017, South Londoners Tom Dowse, Nick Buxton, and Lewis Maynard had all known each other for years but had separately played in bands in the area. Buxton and Maynard are former members of the indie band La Shark, with whom they released music under the respective aliases NHA Buxton and Love Maynard. Once they went into their thirties, their pursuits of a career in music became overshadowed by other ventures; Maynard worked with adults with learning disabilities, Dowse was a visiting arts lecturer at the University for the Creative Arts in Farnham, England, and Buxton built furniture. Nonetheless, in 2017 Dowse and Buxton asked Maynard if he wished to join a new band. Relegated to a pastime, the group practised in Maynard's mother's garage on the weekends. Despite initial intentions to just be a hobby between the three of them, they decided to take the band more earnestly after having a conversation in a Wimpy, spending months writing music and forming the basis of what would become Dry Cleaning. The trio still lacked a vocalist, though, and attempts to find a singer, including themselves, were unfruitful.

I think it was Tom [Dowse] that put the name forward. It's the same process when you name any band, when you're just trying to come up with a couple of words that mean something. It's kind of a ridiculous process and completely arbitrary, but we quite liked the domesticity of it.

— Nick Buxton

In search for a different approach, Dowse thought of Florence Shaw, also a visiting university lecturer, who each band member had met previously at various points during school. The band invited Shaw to listen to demos they had made, and upon hearing her voice alongside the recordings, the trio convinced her to join in on a rehearsal session. Buxton reassured Shaw beforehand that she could perform spoken-word in lieu of singing and gave her a playlist consisting of "eccentric pop cuts" such as Grace Jones' cover of "Private Life" and a song by Will Powers to serve as potential inspiration. During rehearsal, Shaw recited text related to an assortment of material that she kept, including illustrations, her phone, diaries, and adverts. She later said of the experience, "I was leafing through this big stack of paper fairly frantically ... I was crouched on the floor with a microphone, and I was like, 'I don't think they can even hear me. It's fine. Just go for it.' At the end they were like, 'That sounded great!'" After being initially reluctant to join for months, Shaw officially joined the band in early 2018. In an interview for Under the Radar, she said that the band had already adopted the Dry Cleaning moniker by the time she joined.

The band released their debut EP, Sweet Princess, in September 2018 on Bandcamp and SoundCloud, followed by its lead single, "Magic of Meghan", later in July 2019. Shaw wrote the song after going through a break-up and moving out of her former partner's apartment the same day that Meghan Markle and Prince Harry announced they were engaged. This was followed by the release of a second EP, Boundary Road Snacks and Drinks, in October. The band were included as part of the NME 100 of 2020, as well as DIY magazine's Class of 2020.

=== 2020–2021: New Long Leg ===
In March 2020, the independent record label 4AD announced that Dry Cleaning had signed to them. Meanwhile, the band had just started touring in the U.S. for the first time, but by the time they had performed their first live shows at Saint Vitus and Union Pool in Brooklyn, New York, the anticipated coronavirus pandemic had caused future concerts, including one at the SXSW Music Festival, to cancel. The group postponed their tour and returned to the UK for the duration of the pandemic, spending that time to record material for what ultimately became New Long Leg.

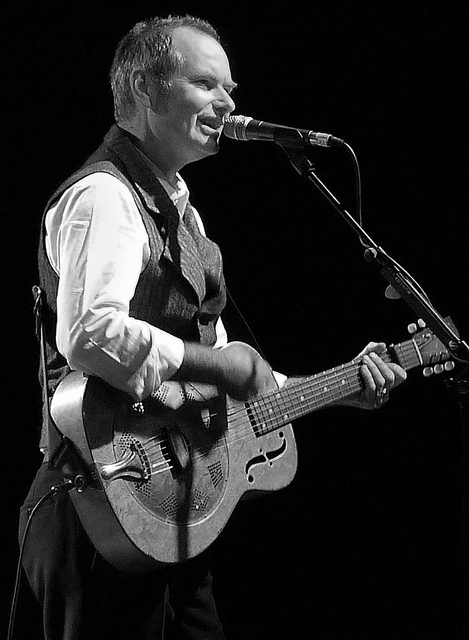
John Parish (pictured) produced Dry Cleaning's first two albums.

In November 2020, the band shared the lead single from the album, "Scratchcard Lanyard", then in February 2021, the band shared details for New Long Leg with the second single, "Strong Feelings". Released on 2 April, the album was recorded at Rockfield Studios in Wales and was produced by John Parish. It was subject to widespread critical acclaim, and it debuted at no. 4 on the UK Albums Chart, their highest position to date. Whereas Shaw's lyrics on their early EPs had been largely based on found texts, much of the album had been informed by her own writings.

Later that year, Dry Cleaning issued the New Long Leg outtakes "Bug Eggs" and "Tony Speaks!" as a standalone double A-side single in July, and then they released a 12-inch vinyl of demos from the album's sessions called Tascam Tapes, exclusively through Rough Trade record shops in November.

=== 2022–2023: Stumpwork ===
On 14 June 2022, the band released a new single, "Don't Press Me", with the announcement of their second album Stumpwork, which was released on 21 October 2022. Like their debut, it was recorded at Rockfield Studios and produced by John Parish. It saw the band introducing a wider variety of musical styles to their repertoire, such as jangle-pop and funk. Shaw improvised much of the lyrics in studio, taking inspiration from observations she made during her London walks. The album would go on to win Best Recording Package at the 66th Annual Grammy Awards.

Later in 2023, Dry Cleaning released two outtakes from Stumpwork, "Swampy" and "Sombre Two", as singles on 14 February. The songs, having previously appeared on the Japanese CD of Stumpwork, were in promotion of an upcoming compilation EP entitled Swampy, released on 1 March. It also contained the demo "Peanuts" and remixes of "Hot Penny Day" and "Gary Ashby". The latter remix was done by singer-songwriter Nourished by Time, who the band toured with that year for eighteen shows.

=== 2024–present: Secret Love ===
In 2024, 4AD re-released a compilation of their first two EPs, and the band, having previously been unable to tour in support of the original release due to the COVID-19 pandemic, decided to continue touring. Regarding this period, Dowse later said "It was quite appealing actually, because we could go back to playing slightly smaller venues, play as a four-piece, and just rock out a bit." For a brief period in the summer, they began to write material back home in Peckham, London for a new album before returning on tour. At this point, they were often playing in stadiums as the opener for Nick Cave and the Bad Seeds.

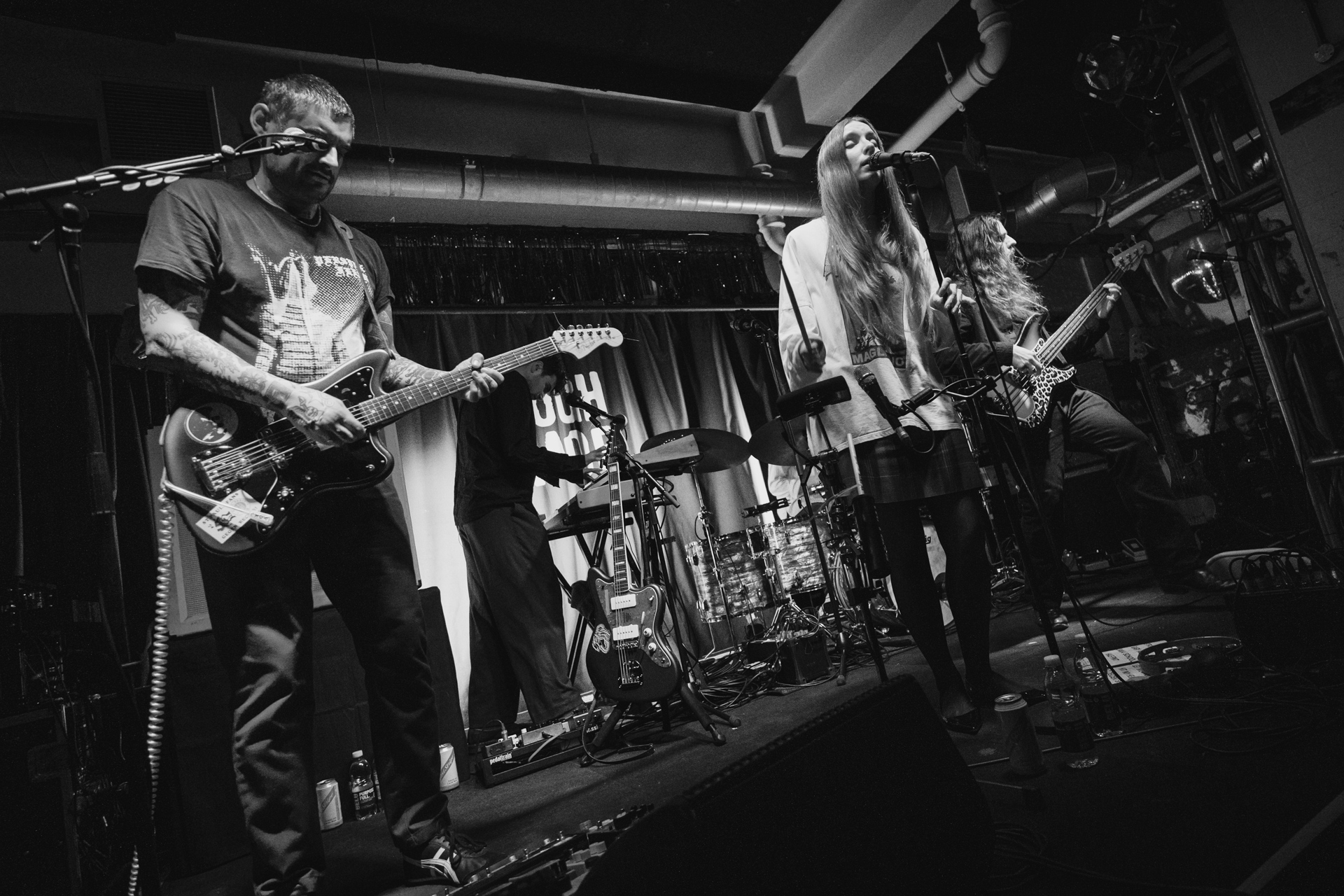
Dry Cleaning at Rough Trade East, 2026

In June 2025, it was revealed that Dry Cleaning had been recording their third studio album with Welsh producer Cate Le Bon in France. During the recording process, Le Bon noted: "I'm really enjoying being here and being really present. The band just keep revealing themselves to be more and more lovely." Shaw told the magazine Uncut that they had met Le Bon in 2022 while she was recording with Wilco for their album Cousin. Wilco frontman Jeff Tweedy had originally invited the group to visit his studio, The Loft, after Dry Cleaning performed at the Pitchfork Music Festival in Chicago. After a number of sessions in Chicago, London, and Dublin—the latter with members of the Gilla Band—they finished recording the album with Le Bon at Black Box Studios in the Loire Valley, France.

The album, entitled Secret Love, was announced in late September 2025 with lead single "Hit My Head All Day" and was released on 9 January 2026. In promotion, they commissioned Bullyache to choreograph music videos for every song. Musically, the band continued to expand upon their sound, with Shaw often singing rather than speaking for the choruses. As a first for the group, Secret Love later received a deluxe edition, expanding the original album to include three bonus tracks that were recorded during their sessions with Le Bon but were excluded from the original track list. The songs were again accompanied by Bullyache-choreographed videos. The deluxe edition of Secret Love was released digitally in July 2026, with the vinyl version scheduled for October.

== Members ==
- Nick Buxton – drums, percussion, programming, keyboards, saxophone
- Tom Dowse – guitar, keyboards, tape loops
- Lewis Maynard – bass
- Florence Shaw – vocals, percussion, tape loops, recorder

Current touring musicians

- Josh Eggerton – keyboards, additional guitar (2026–present)

Former touring musicians

- Daniel Rumsey – keyboards (2022–2023)

== Discography ==
Studio albums

- New Long Leg (2021)
- Stumpwork (2022)
- Secret Love (2026)

EPs

- Sweet Princess (2018)
- Boundary Road Snacks and Drinks (2019)

== Awards and nominations ==
Year	Association	Category	Nominated work	Result	Ref
2021	AIM Independent Music Awards	Best Independent Album	New Long Leg	Nominated	
2022	Libera Awards	Record of the Year	New Long Leg	Nominated	
2022	Libera Awards	Best Alternative Rock Record	New Long Leg	Nominated	
2023	Libera Awards	Record of the Year	Stumpwork	Nominated	
2023	Libera Awards	Best Alternative Rock Record	Stumpwork	Nominated	
2024	Grammy Awards	Best Recording Package	Stumpwork	Won	
