= Stumpwork (album) =

2022 studio album by Dry Cleaning

Studio album by Dry Cleaning
- Released: 21 October 2022
- Recorded: October & December 2021
- Studios: Rockfield (Monmouthshire, Wales); J&J (Bristol, England)
- Genres: Post-punk; spoken word; jangle pop; funk
- Length: 45:16
- Label: 4AD
- Producer: John Parish

Dry Cleaning chronology
Tascam Tapes (2021)	Stumpwork (2022)	Swampy (2023)

Singles from Stumpwork
- 1. "Don't Press Me" Released: 14 June 2022; 2. "Anna Calls from the Arctic" Released: 26 July 2022; 3. "Gary Ashby" Released: 7 September 2022; 4. "No Decent Shoes for Rain" Released: 11 October 2022

Stumpwork is the second studio album by the English post-punk band Dry Cleaning, released on 21 October 2022 through independent label 4AD Records. Preceded by four singles, it is also the band's second consecutive record to be produced by John Parish on 4AD.

The album sees the band stylistically expand upon their previous record New Long Leg (2021), incorporating elements from genres such as jangle pop and funk whilst dealing with themes such as grief and consumerism. Like its predecessor, it was acclaimed upon release, and it landed on several year-end lists. At the 2024 Grammys, Stumpwork won the award for Best Recording Package.

== Background and recording ==
In 2021, shortly after their commercially successful and critically lauded debut album New Long Leg, Dry Cleaning began writing material for their next album. The restrictions from the coronavirus pandemic that had forced their debut to be recorded in two weeks also created an environment in which they spent a considerably longer amount of time to write.

The band decided to work again with producer John Parish and engineer Joe Jones to make what would become Stumpwork. After a two-day rehearsal at Factory Studios in Bristol, Dry Cleaning recorded between J&J Studios in Bristol and Rockfield Studios in Wales; the former studio's sessions occurred in October 2021, with the latter in both October and December 2021. Lyrically, Stumpwork is a departure from vocalist Florence Shaw's approach of reciting found texts. Shaw opted to largely improvise in the studio, based in part on observations made during walks through flea markets and London streets. She additionally sourced lyrics from old press cuttings archived by Edda Tasiemka.

== Title and artwork ==
The album is named after a style of embroidery from the 17th century, a word that Shaw found pleasing.

The band enlisted Rottingdean Bazaar (a creative duo consisting of James Theseus Buck and Luke Brooks), photographer Annie Collinge, and graphic designer Claire Huss to create the artwork. Rottingdean Bazaar had previously worked with Dry Cleaning when creating the music video for "Scratchcard Lanyard". The front cover features a photograph of a bar of soap decorated with pubic hair spelling out the album title. Collinge told Creative Review her account of the inspiration behind the design choice: "I had taken an iPhone picture of a blue soap with a curly hair on it, and Rottingdean Bazaar had done lots of things with pube lettering so suddenly it sparked an idea". The front cover art was met with strong reactions, with many finding it nauseating. To the band members, the divisive nature of the cover was an unexpected byproduct. In an interview for Uncut, guitarist Tom Dowse said: "I thought it was a really beautiful image with a good sense of humour. Very intimate and quite moving. Then when people started to say it was disgusting, I was like, 'Oh, really? Are we that prudish about things?'"

== Composition ==
"Kwenchy Kups"
A brief excerpt from "Kwenchy Kups", showing Stumpwork's occasional tendency toward jangle pop.

"Hot Penny Day"
A sample from the funk-influenced "Hot Penny Day", with Lewis Maynard on wah-wah bass.

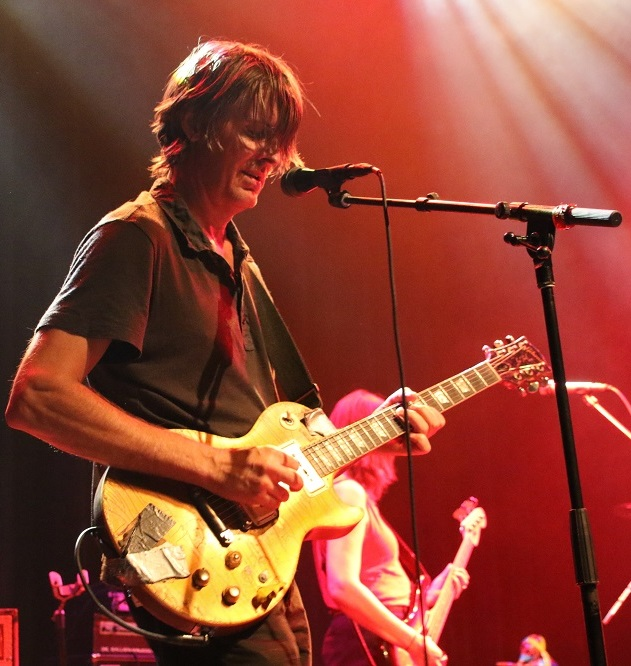
Stephen Malkmus (pictured) was a primary influence for guitarist Tom Dowse on Stumpwork.

=== Style ===
Like its predecessor, the album has been categorised as a post-punk album, though on Stumpwork the band incorporated a new set of influences that invoked additional genre descriptors, most notably jangle pop and funk, whereas on New Long Leg, Dry Cleaning prioritised relatively straightforward, groove-oriented rock. Florence Shaw largely retains the qualities of her vocal performance with her utilisation of spoken word with a conversational, deadpan delivery. While some commentators have labelled this as sprechgesang, a vocal style that simultaneously blends spoken word with singing, others were mindful to distinguish this from the more accurate description of spoken word or narration that is occasionally interspersed with sung vocals.

Stumpwork reinforces the jangle-pop element that New Long Leg had only hinted at, most notably on its three shortest tracks, "Kwenchy Kups", "Gary Ashby", and "Don't Press Me". The latter two were considered by Scott Russell of Paste magazine to be "The tracks that followed New Long Leg the closest". In particular, critics have likened guitarist Tom Dowse's performance to former Smiths guitarist Johnny Marr. Otherwise, the band introduced a new set of musical influences for Stumpwork, resulting in a more varied album that often features more sombre and moody textures. The album has additionally seen comparisons to funk—a genre of specific interest to bassist Lewis Maynard—and the band Pavement. Dowse told The New York Times that "I was thinking a lot about Stephen Malkmus when I was doing my guitar parts, that sort of wonkiness," revealing that he used a Jazzmaster guitar on the album in an effort to channel the sound from various rock bands from the 1990s such as Dinosaur Jr. and Sonic Youth.

=== Themes and lyrics ===
In the lead-up to the album, two band members' relatives, to whom the record was dedicated, died: Maynard's mother and Dowse's grandfather. The grief stemming from those events inspired Dry Cleaning to write "No Decent Shoes for Rain". Elsewhere, grief manifested in a separate context on "Gary Ashby", a song about the titular family tortoise that had escaped during pandemic lockdown. Shaw elaborated in Uncut magazine that the story of "Gary Ashby" is fictional and that she had never own a tortoise before, adding "I wish I could have one, but I don't have the lifestyle that could accommodate a pet at all." Another common theme is commentary on a dystopian late stage capitalistic society juxtaposed with an embrace of consumerism. This is made explicit on tracks such as "Anna Calls from the Arctic" with the lines "Nothing works / Everything's expensive / And opaque and privatised / My shoe organising thing arrived / Thank God". Also, on "Hot Penny Day"—named after a medieval tradition in Honiton, Devon, England where the wealthy would toss down burning hot pennies toward local crowds arriving to attend the town market—Shaw opens with the line "If I could live across the road from a boot fair, wouldn't that be something?"

Besides the aforementioned themes of grief and consumerism, the album explores surrealism and everyday mundane activities, and brief moments of humour injected via non-sequitors. While Stumpwork deals with many subjects, some more dour than others, Shaw has said that the band's intention was to "set out to write an optimistic record. There's a lot of humour in what we do."

== Singles, promotion, and release ==
Dry Cleaning released four attached singles in anticipation for Stumpwork. On 14 June 2022, the band revealed the lead single, "Don't Press Me", with the announcement for the album and an accompanying music video by Peter Millard. The video was described by Kieran Press-Reynolds in Pitchfork as "cartoon versions of the band's faces rolling around like bouncy balls." Then on 26 July, "Anna Calls from the Arctic" was released with a statement that the track was inspired by John Barry film scores and calls with a friend who had worked in the Arctic. Following two more singles, "Gary Ashby" on 7 September and "No Decent Shoes for Rain" on 11 October, Stumpwork was released on 21 October 2022, subsequently reaching no. 11 on the UK Albums Chart.

Prior to its release, Dry Cleaning held a free listening party at Flipper's Roller Boogie Palace, a roller skating rink in Rockefeller Center, New York City on 10 October. Later on 9 January 2023, one day before re-embarking on an expanded world tour in support of Stumpwork, Dry Cleaning appeared on The Tonight Show Starring Jimmy Fallon to perform "Hot Penny Day".

== Critical reception ==
Professional ratings
Aggregate scores
Source	Rating
AnyDecentMusic?	8.4/10
Metacritic	85/100
Review scores
Source	Rating
AllMusic	4.5/5 stars
The Guardian	4/5 stars
The Independent	2/5 stars
Mojo	4/5 stars
NME	5/5 stars
Paste	8.3/10
Pitchfork	7.8/10
Rolling Stone	4/5 stars
Uncut	9/10
Under the Radar	8.5/10

According to the review aggregator Metacritic, Stumpwork received "universal acclaim" based on a weighted average score of 85 out of 100 from 22 critic scores. Another aggregator AnyDecentMusic? gave it 8.4 out of 10 based on 24 critical reviews.

In a five star review for the NME, Patrick Clarke called Stumpwork "a bold leap forward, one that sets the band apart from their contemporaries and defies categorization". In Paste, Scott Russell said that while it "has enough in common with its predecessor so as not to throw fans for a loop," it "is very much its own moody, nuanced animal, an expressive and expectation-defying showcase of Dry Cleaning's blossoming sound." Connor Fenton, a critic writing for Dork magazine, similarly said that it is "Packed with the same strangely comforting weirdness and entrancing rhythms of their first album," continuing: "Rhythmically, the band have found new lengths to subvert expectations, with a driving force behind every song that provides a steady stage for guitar fills and spoken word highlights."

In reference to the band's efforts to broaden their musical style from the "straight-ahead" New Long Leg, Heather Phares opined in a review for AllMusic that Stumpwork's "varied styles reflect Dry Cleaning's growing confidence", adding that its "warmth, sensuality, and humor reveal their originality even more fully." Likewise, John Amen of Beats Per Minute thought that "The band effectively synthesize various templates, showcasing their reconfiguration of everything from goth-pop to new wave to contemporary post-punk", while Hal Horowitz over in the magazine American Songwriter lauded the band's willingness to "move their boundaries further afield regardless of appealing to a bigger audience." In a negative review, Mark Beaumont of The Independent gave Stumpwork two stars out of five, feeling that the band was "perhaps struggling for new ways to mess with music".

Multiple critics have singled out Shaw's role, praising her vocal delivery and lyrics as the album's primary appeal. Cat Woods of The Telegraph stated that, in absence of the fatigue Shaw had felt in her personal life—a feeling that had informed the writing of New Long Leg—"On Stumpwork, there's a greater confidence to her delivery, which seems even wilder and weirder." In Pitchfork, Kieran Press-Reynolds said "Part of the thrill is the sheer unpredictability of her monologues". Kory Grow of Rolling Stone thought that Shaw's newfound approach of improvising lyrics made her "stream-of-consciousness a little more coherent."

While praise was often focused on Shaw, reviewers also noted the quality of the instrumentals, primarily in relation to their interaction with Shaw. As said by Tom Pinnock in Uncut, "it's the interaction between them that makes Stumpwork such a triumph. They work together and against each other, pushing and pulling, fighting arrhythmically or slipping into step as the moment demands." Elsewhere, Victoria Segal in Mojo wrote that they "expand and contract around her with giddy invention", and Scott Dransfield of Under the Radar said "it really coheres in a satisfying way." Hayley Scott of The Quietus was a bit more reserved in their assessment of the instrumentals. "Lyrically, Stumpwork triumphs over anything produced by their contemporaries, but that might have been to the detriment of the music, which bravely evades the instrumental vitality of their debut"; however, Scott then added: "But it is an album rooted in grief ... and with that knowledge, Stumpwork suddenly makes a lot more sense.

Overall, Dave Simpson of The Guardian found that, in contrast to Dry Cleaning's previous material, "everything is slightly more refined, melodious and focused." In The Irish Times, Siobhán Kane felt that Stumpwork "is richer, and with a surprising warmth at its core." One track in particular, the seven-minute long "Liberty Log", caught the attention of a few critics; Rob Moura of PopMatters called it the album's "finest song and an arguable peak in Dry Cleaning's young body of work", while in Record Collector, Daryl Easlea believed the song shows "that there is plenty of scope for the group to survive their current flavour of the month-ness." Rating the album 9 out of 10 for The Line of Best Fit, Ross Horton thought that "It feels as though the band are having a second go at a first impression, and it's a much more muscular and robust effort as a result, while also showcasing more colours, more ideas, more craft", concluding that "Stumpwork is an essential album, and one of the very best of 2022."

=== Accolades ===
At the 66th Annual Grammy Awards the art directors of Stumpwork—Luke Brooks, James Theseus Buck, and Annie Collinge—won the Grammy Award for Best Recording Package. The album was also nominated at the 2023 Libera Awards for Record of the Year and Best Alternative Rock Record, but ultimately lost to Wet Leg's self-titled debut album.

Year-end lists
Publication	List	Rank	Ref
Crack	The Top 50 Albums of the Year	38	
DIY	Albums of 2022	10	
Mojo	The 50 Best Albums of 2022	9	
NME	The 50 Best Albums of 2022	25	
Paste	The 50 Best Albums of 2022	37	
PopMatters	The 25 Best Indie Albums of 2022	4	
Slant Magazine	The 50 Best Albums of 2022	31	
Slate	The Best Albums of 2022	N/A	
Uncut	Best New Albums of 2022	24	
Under the Radar	Top 100 Albums of 2022	13	
Uproxx	The Best Indie Albums of 2022	N/A	

== Track listing ==
All lyrics are written by Florence Shaw; all music is composed by Dry Cleaning.

Stumpwork track listing
No.	Title	Length
1.	"Anna Calls from the Arctic"	4:57
2.	"Kwenchy Kups"	2:45
3.	"Gary Ashby"	2:10
4.	"Driver's Story"	3:41
5.	"Hot Penny Day"	3:37
6.	"Stumpwork"	4:11
7.	"No Decent Shoes for Rain"	5:57
8.	"Don't Press Me"	1:50
9.	"Conservative Hell"	3:48
10.	"Liberty Log"	6:52
11.	"Icebergs"	5:23
Total length:		45:16

Japanese bonus tracks
No.	Title	Length
12.	"Swampy"	3:33
13.	"Sombre Two"	2:16
Total length:		51:05

== Personnel ==
Credits are adapted from the CD liner notes of Stumpwork.

Dry Cleaning

- Florence Shaw – vocals, recorder, percussion
- Lewis Maynard – bass, double bass, bird calls, organ, percussion
- Tom Dowse – guitars, Fender Jazzmaster, lap steel guitar, keyboards, tape loops, percussion, whistle, kazoo
- Nick Buxton – drums, percussion, drum programming, keyboards, synthesiser, vibraphone, tenor saxophone, clarinet, horn arrangements

Additional musicians

- Gavin Fitzjohn – tenor saxophone, baritone saxophone, flugelhorn, trumpet
- John Parish – vibraphone, piano, percussion, trombone
- Joe Jones – field recording, tape treatments
- Buckley – barks on "Driver's Story"

Technical

- John Parish – production, mixing
- Joe Jones – engineering
- Oliver Baldwin – engineering, additional mix engineering
- Fabian Prynn – additional engineering
- Ali Chant – mixing
- Jason Mitchell – mastering, lacquer cut

Design

- Rottingdean Bazaar – artwork, design, creative direction, styling
- Annie Collinge – artwork, design, photography
- Claire Huss – graphic design

== Charts ==
Chart performance for Stumpwork
Chart (2022)	Peak position
Australian Albums (ARIA)	77
Belgian Albums (Ultratop Flanders)	30
Belgian Albums (Ultratop Wallonia)	135
German Albums (Offizielle Top 100)	51
Portuguese Albums (AFP)	33
Scottish Albums (OCC)	9
UK Albums (OCC)	11
UK Independent Albums (OCC)	4
US Heatseekers Albums (Billboard)	13
US Top Album Sales (Billboard)	34

== Swampy (EP) ==
Swampy

EP by Dry Cleaning
- Released: 1 March 2023
- Recorded: October 2020 ("Peanuts"); October & December 2021
- Studios: Rockfield (Monmouthshire, Wales); J&J (Bristol, England)
- Length: 14:33
- Label: 4AD
- Producer: John Parish

Dry Cleaning chronology
Stumpwork (2022)	Swampy (2023)	Secret Love (2026)

Singles from Swampy
- 1. "Swampy" / "Sombre Two" Released: 14 February 2023

On 14 February 2023, Dry Cleaning released two outtakes from Stumpwork, "Swampy" and "Sombre Two", as singles. "Swampy" had originally been released as the B-side to the vinyl of "Don't Press Me", and both songs were then relegated as bonus tracks to the Japanese CD of Stumpwork. The songs were in promotion for an upcoming EP entitled Swampy, which additionally contained remixes of "Hot Penny Day" and "Gary Ashby", and the demo "Peanuts". Swampy was released on 1 March 2023.

=== Track listing ===
All lyrics are written by Florence Shaw; all music is composed by Dry Cleaning.

Swampy track listing
No.	Title	Length
1.	"Swampy"	3:33
2.	"Sombre Two"	2:16
3.	"Hot Penny Day" (Charlotte Adigéry & Bolis Pupul remix)	4:58
4.	"Gary Ashby" (Nourished by Time remix)	2:13
5.	"Peanuts" (demo)	1:33
Total length:		14:33

=== Personnel ===
Credits are adapted from the cassette notes of Swampy and Tidal.

Dry Cleaning

- Florence Shaw
- Lewis Maynard
- Tom Dowse
- Nick Buxton – recording of "Peanuts"

Additional personnel

- Gavin Fitzjohn – additional performer on "Swampy"
- Charlotte Adigéry, Bolis Pupul – remix of "Hot Penny Day"
- Marcus "Nourished by Time" Brown – remix of "Gary Ashby"
- John Parish – production, mixing
- Joe Jones – engineering
- Oliver Baldwin – engineering, additional mix engineering
- Fabian Prynn – additional engineering
- Ali Chant – mixing
- Jason Mitchell – mastering
- PG Howlin' Studio – design, photography
