= American Weekend =

Studio album by Waxahatchee
- Released: January 12, 2012
- Genres: Indie folk; lo-fi; alternative country
- Length: 33:50
- Label: Don Giovanni

Waxahatchee chronology
American Weekend (2012)	Cerulean Salt (2013)

American Weekend is the debut studio album by American indie music project Waxahatchee, released on January 12, 2012 by Don Giovanni Records.

== Critical reception and legacy ==
Professional ratings
Review scores
Source	Rating
AllMusic	4/5 stars
Punknews.org	3.5/5 stars

On June 11, 2012, "Be Good" was the song of the day on NPR, as well as one of the best 50 songs of 2012. American Weekend was named a top album of 2012 by The New York Times and Dusted magazine. Singer-songwriter Emily Kinney covered "Be Good" on her 2014 Expired Love album.

In October 2025, Paste ranked the album at number 238 on their "250 Greatest Albums of the 21st Century So Far" list, writing: "Katie Crutchfield has put out many fantastic albums over the years under the Waxahatchee moniker, from Cerulean Salt to Tigers Blood, but we owe those records to her outstanding debut solo LP, American Weekend. With its lo-fi production, pared-down, acoustic instrumentations, and vulnerable lyrics, American Weekend feels deeply intimate, like one of those records that you’d be convinced was written just for you if you found it at the right time."

== Track listing ==
1. "Catfish" – 3:59
2. "Grass Stain" – 2:30
3. "Rose, 1956" – 2:47
4. "American Weekend" – 4:11
5. "Michel" – 3:01
6. "Be Good" – 2:33
7. "Luminary Blake" – 2:41
8. "Magic City Wholesale" – 3:01
9. "Bathtub" – 3:13
10. "I Think I Love You" – 3:23
11. "Noccalula" – 2:42
