= Tigers Blood =

Studio album by Waxahatchee
- Released: March 22, 2024
- Recorded: 2022–2023
- Studio: Sonic Ranch
- Genre: Indie rock; folk rock; alternative country
- Length: 44:26
- Label: Anti-
- Producer: Brad Cook

Waxahatchee chronology
I Walked with You a Ways (2022)	Tigers Blood (2024)

Singles from Tigers Blood
- 1. "Right Back to It" Released: January 9, 2024; 2. "Bored" Released: February 13, 2024; 3. "365" Released: March 12, 2024

Tigers Blood is the sixth studio album by American singer-songwriter Waxahatchee. It was released on March 22, 2024, through Anti-. It was preceded by the release of three singles, "Right Back to It", "Bored", and "365". The album received acclaim from critics, and garnered Waxahatchee a nomination for the Grammy Award for Best Americana Album, her first nomination at the awards.

== Background ==
Following the release of Saint Cloud (2020), which posed "an obvious pivot" in sound to the singer, Katie Crutchfield and her producer Brad Cook were unsure as to how to follow-up the record as due to a vast positive reception. The singer started writing material for the album during a "hot hand spell" while on tour towards the end of 2022. The track "365" with prominent "pop sound, pop production" was created during early recording sessions at Sonic Ranch, Texas. Guitarist MJ Lenderman was later invited by the duo and would eventually be featured on all of the songs playing electric guitar. A harmonization with him on "Right Back to It" "was the big pivotal moment" for her and Cook that they wanted to capture on the whole album. Other collaborators include Spencer Tweedy and Phil Cook.

Crutchfield revealed that Tigers Blood came together "much more easily" in comparison to Saint Cloud as she felt at peace with herself. After an interview with the singer, Andy Cush of Pitchfork opined that Crutchfield has "gotten better" at songwriting even though the record has more in common with her earlier work. Tigers Blood features tales of "late-night fights with loved ones, friendships frayed beyond repair, and elegies for an idyllic past" that may have never existed. Waxahatchee embarked a North America tour to promote the record from April to August 2024.

== Singles ==
The album announcement on January 9, 2024, also saw the release of the lead single "Right Back to It". With the track, Crutchfield expressed her desire to write love songs that are "gritty and unromantic" and to always find your way back "to a newness or an intimacy" with the same person. The second single "Bored", released on February 13, is a "high-spirited" track with "country flair". Crutchfield wrote the song from an authentic but challenging place of anger.

== Radio play ==
Tigers Blood spent five weeks atop the NACC chart, as well as time at number one on the NACC Non-comm chart and four weeks atop NACC Canadian.

== Critical reception ==
Professional ratings
Aggregate scores
Source	Rating
AnyDecentMusic?	8.5/10
Metacritic	89/100
Review scores
Source	Rating
AllMusic	4.5/5 stars
DIY	4.5/5 stars
The Independent	4/5 stars
The Line of Best Fit	9/10
NME	5/5 stars
The Observer	3/5 stars
Paste	9.3/10
Pitchfork	8.8/10
The Skinny	5/5 stars
Slant Magazine	4.5/5 stars

According to the review aggregator Metacritic, Tigers Blood received "universal acclaim" based on a weighted average score of 89 out of 100 from 26 critic scores. Editors at review aggregator AnyDecentMusic? scored this album an 8.5 out of 10, based on 21 critics' scores.

Reviewing the album for AllMusic, senior editor Stephen Thomas Erlewine wrote, "There's something bracing about the warmth Crutchfield creates on Tigers Blood, particularly in how it emanates as much from the performances as it does the songs," and called it, "the rarest of things: an album that feels familiar upon its surface and idiosyncratic in its details."

Pitchfork awarded Tigers Blood a "Best New Album" designation, writing that Crutchfield's "dazzling, piercing songwriting is perfectly in tune with the band behind her."

For The Observer, writer and editor Damien Morris noted its "precision and broad relatability", with her vocals "poised and precise – her best yet, caressing flamboyantly poetic lyrics."

Writing for The Line of Best Fit, John Amen concluded, "While Saint Cloud arguably represents the apex of Crutchfield's hook-savviness, Tigers Blood features flawlessly sculpted melodies as well as vocals that are more notably complex and lyrics that more thoroughly plumb the human condition. With Tigers Blood, Crutchfield continues to perfect her songcraft and elevate the Americana genre – asserting a panoramic vision, radiating wisdom."

=== Year-end lists ===
Select year-end rankings for Tigers Blood
Publication/critic	Accolade	Rank	Ref.
Consequence	50 Best Albums of 2024	3	
Exclaim!	50 Best Albums of 2024	3	
Mojo	The Best Albums of 2024	30	
Pitchfork	50 Best Albums of 2024	6	
Rough Trade UK	Albums of the Year 2024	25	
Uncut	80 Best Albums of 2024	10	

== Track listing ==
All tracks are written by Katie Crutchfield.

Tigers Blood – Standard edition
No.	Title	Length
1.	"3 Sisters"	4:10
2.	"Evil Spawn"	3:12
3.	"Ice Cold"	3:30
4.	"Right Back to It"	4:33
5.	"Burns Out at Midnight"	3:04
6.	"Bored"	2:55
7.	"Lone Star Lake"	3:16
8.	"Crimes of the Heart"	3:04
9.	"Crowbar"	4:01
10.	"365"	3:07
11.	"The Wolves"	3:58
12.	"Tigers Blood"	3:56
Total length:		44:26

Tigers Blood – Streaming edition bonus track
No.	Title	Length
13.	"Much Ado About Nothing"	3:50
Total length:		46:36

== Personnel ==
Credits adapted from the album's liner notes and Tidal.

=== Waxahatchee ===
- Katie Crutchfield – acoustic guitar (tracks 1–9, 12), all vocals (1, 3, 8–10, 13), lead vocals (2, 4–7, 11, 12), harmony vocals (2), high bass guitar (8)
- MJ Lenderman – electric guitar (1–12), drone guitar (1), harmony vocals (2–5, 12), baritone acoustic guitar (5), acoustic guitar (10), group vocals (12)
- Phil Cook – production (all tracks), Dobro (1, 5, 11), organ (1, 2, 6–10), piano (1–3, 5, 6, 11), banjo (3, 4, 7, 8, 12), harmonica (5), marimba (7), accordion (9), electric slide guitar (12), group vocals (12)
- Brad Cook – bass guitar (1–7, 9, 11, 12), Prophet-6 (1), vocal engineering (6), low bass guitar (8), baritone acoustic guitar (10), group vocals (12)
- Spencer Tweedy – drums, additional percussion (1–9, 11, 12); Mellotron (1), harmony vocals (5); cedar plank, cymbal (10); group vocals (12)

=== Additional contributors ===
- Nick Bockrath – pedal steel (6)
- Natalia Chernitsky – group vocals (12), assistant engineering (all tracks)
- Gerardo "Jerry" Ordonez – engineering, mixing
- Mario Ramirez – pedal steel engineering (6)
- Emily Lazar – mastering
- Molly Matalon – photography
- Andreina Byrne – set production
- Mike Krol – design

== Charts ==
Chart performance for Tigers Blood
Chart (2024)	Peak position
Australian Country Albums (ARIA)	14
Belgian Albums (Ultratop Flanders)	101
French Physical Albums (SNEP)	172
New Zealand Albums (RMNZ)	35
Scottish Albums (OCC)	7
Spanish Vinyl Albums (PROMUSICAE)	48
Swedish Physical Albums (Sverigetopplistan)	7
UK Albums (OCC)	38
UK Independent Albums (OCC)	4
US Billboard 200	146
US Independent Albums (Billboard)	27
