= Snocaps (album) =

2025 album by Snocaps

Studio album by Snocaps
- Released: October 31, 2025
- Genres: Indie rock, indie folk
- Length: 33:43
- Label: Anti-
- Producer: Brad Cook

Snocaps is the debut full-length album from American indie rock band Snocaps, consisting of Katie and Allison Crutchfield, joined by multi-instrumentalist MJ Lenderman and producer Brad Cook. The album was surprise-released on October 31, 2025. The album was named one of the "11 New Albums You Should Listen to Now" by Pitchfork upon its release.

== Background ==
The Snocaps project marks the first time the Crutchfield twins had recorded music together since the split of their previous band, PS Eliot. It also marks Allison Crutchfield's first new music in seven years, following the release of the fourth Swearin' album Fall Into the Sun in 2018. In a post to her Substack newsletter, Katie Crutchfield noted that she and Alison had initially broached the idea of a new project in 2023, prior to the release of the Waxahatchee album Tigers Blood. She wrote that the sisters were interested in "making something akin to what we made when we were younger" with "no ambitions and no plan, purely for our own enjoyment, for the experience of making something we ourselves wanted to hear." The album was recorded with Cook and Lenderman over the course of a week, with Katie describing the experience as "realigning with the earliest, purest versions of our music-making selves".

== Track listing ==
Snocaps track listing
No.	Title	Writer(s)	Length
1.	"Coast"	Allison Crutchfield	2:23
2.	"Heathcliff"	A. Crutchfield	2:29
3.	"Wasteland"	Katie Crutchfield	3:13
4.	"Brand New City"	A. Crutchfield	3:04
5.	"Hide"	K. Crutchfield	3:30
6.	"Cherry Hard Candy"	K. Crutchfield	2:40
7.	"Avalanche"	A. Crutchfield	2:24
8.	"Doom"	K. Crutchfield	3:03
9.	"Over Our Heads"	A. Crutchfield	2:15
10.	"Angel Wings"	K. Crutchfield	2:52
11.	"I Don't Want To"	K. Crutchfield	2:37
12.	"You In Rehab"	A. Crutchfield	2:31
13.	"Coast II"	A. Crutchfield	0:36
Total length:			33:43

== Personnel ==
Adapted from Tidal.

=== Snocaps ===
- Brad Cook – production, recording, mixing (all tracks); background vocals (track 1), bass guitar (4, 9–11); drums, organ (11)
- Allison Crutchfield – lead vocals (1, 2, 4, 7, 9, 12), background vocals (1, 3, 5, 6, 8, 10, 11), drums (1, 7, 9, 12), electric guitar (1, 12), organ (1), bass guitar (2, 5, 8)
- Katie Crutchfield – background vocals (1, 2, 4, 7, 9, 11, 12), bass guitar (1), acoustic guitar (2, 3, 5, 9–11, 13), lead vocals (3, 5, 6, 8, 10–11), electric guitar (7, 8)
- MJ Lenderman – electric guitar (1–12), drums (1–6, 8–10), 12-string electric guitar (2–4, 6–8, 10, 12), bass guitar (3, 6, 7, 12), acoustic guitar (6)

=== Additional contributors ===
- Paul Voran – recording, mixing
- Tim Smiley – mastering
- Chris Black – background vocals (1)
- Stella Cook – background vocals (1)
- Lola Crutchfield – lead vocals (13)

== Charts ==
Chart performance for Snocaps
Chart (2025)	Peak position
UK Album Downloads (Official Charts)	17
UK Americana Albums (Official Charts)	19
