= Jess Williamson =

- Williamson performing at SXSW 2019

Background information
- Origin: Austin, Texas
- Genres: Folk; indie
- Occupations: Singer-songwriter; musician
- Instruments: Vocals; guitar; banjo; keyboard
- Years active: 2011–present
- Label: Mexican Summer

Jess Williamson is an American singer-songwriter from Texas, currently based in Los Angeles.

== Career ==
Williamson was born in the suburbs of Dallas, and began playing music while a student at the University of Texas at Austin. She released her first two albums on her own imprint, Brutal Honest: Native State in 2014, and Heart Song in 2016. Following Williamson's move from Austin to Los Angeles, her third album, Cosmic Wink (2018) was released on the label Mexican Summer.

On February 26, 2020, Williamson announced her fourth studio album, Sorceress, and released its first single, "Wind on Tin". Sorceress was released on May 15, 2020, on Mexican Summer and received general praise, with a positive critic score of 74 on review aggregator sites Metacritic and Album of the Year.

In June 2020, Williamson released the single "Pictures of Flowers" with collaborator Hand Habits. National Public Radio's Ann Powers named it her favorite song of 2020.

In July 2022, Williamson announced Plains, a collaboration project with singer-songwriter Katie Crutchfield of Waxahatchee. They released their debut album, I Walked with You a Ways, on October 14, 2022.

Williamson's fifth album as a solo artist, Time Ain't Accidental, came out in June 2023, with the singles "Hunter", "Chasing Spirits", and the title track. In July 2026, Williamson released "Goodbye to All That" as the lead single for her album A Mile South of Heaven, which was released on October 9, 2026. Pitchfork gave A Mile South of Heaven a score of 8.4.

== Discography ==
=== Studio albums ===
- Native State (2014)
- Heart Song (2016)
- Cosmic Wink (2018)
- Sorceress (2020)
- I Walked with You a Ways (2022, with Katie Crutchfield as Plains)
- Time Ain't Accidental (2023)
- A Mile South of Heaven (2026)

=== EPs ===
- Medicine Wheel/Death Songs (2011)
- Texas Blue Digital EP (2022)
