= Time Ain't Accidental =

Studio album by Jess Williamson
- Released: June 9, 2023
- Studio: Puff City, Durham, North Carolina, United States
- Genre: Americana; country pop; indie country; indie folk
- Length: 36:25
- Language: English
- Label: Mexican Summer
- Producer: Brad Cook

Jess Williamson chronology
I Walked with You a Ways (2022)	Time Ain't Accidental (2023)

Time Ain't Accidental is the fifth studio album by American indie folk singer-songwriter Jess Williamson, released on June 9, 2023 by Mexican Summer. The album has received positive reviews.

== Reception ==
According to the review aggregator Metacritic, Time Ain't Accidental received "universal acclaim" based on a weighted average score of 84 out of 100 from seven critic scores. In Exclaim!, Dylan Barnabe gave this album a 7 out of 10, for being "filled with minimalist modern country ballads that gently dissolve like a sugar cube on your tongue". At The Line of Best Fit, Sam Franzini gave Time Ain't Accidental a 9 out of 10, stating that Williamson's songwriting is "consistently the most rewarding part of listening to the record, followed only by her delightfully country twang that comes out when pronouncing certain words". Victoria Segal of Mojo gave this release 4 out of 5 stars, writing that "her lyrical skills allow her to steer the record off Americana’s more clogged highways". Shaad D’Souza of Pitchfork rated this release 8.0 out of 10, writing that it "doesn’t sound like many recent indie-country records... it’s an open, breezy record, often pared back to just saxophone, a nonchalant beat, and Williamson’s voice" that has "a surprisingly versatile palette".

Time Ain't Accidental in best-of lists
Outlet	Listing	Rank
BrooklynVegan	13 Great Country Albums from 2023	—N/a
Gorilla vs. Bear	Gorilla vs. Bear’s Albums of 2023	30
Paste	The 50 Best Albums of 2023	43
Paste	The 30 Best Country, Folk, and Americana Albums of 2023	—N/a
Pitchfork	The 50 Best Albums of 2023	44
Pitchfork	The 37 Best Rock Albums of 2023	—N/a
Qobuz	The Best Albums of 2023	—N/a
The Ringer	The 27 Best Albums of 2023	16
Slate	The best albums of 2023.	Runner-up
Stereogum	Best Country Albums Of 2023 (Marissa R. Moss)	1
Under the Radar	Under the Radar's Top 100 Albums of 2023	26

== Track listing ==
All songs written by Jess Williamson.

1. "Time Ain’t Accidental" – 3:27
2. "Hunter" – 3:49
3. "Chasing Spirits" – 2:45
4. "Tobacco Two Step" – 2:36
5. "God in Everything" – 3:08
6. "A Few Seasons" – 2:24
7. "Topanga Two Step" – 3:59
8. "Something’s in the Way" – 3:07
9. "Stampede" – 2:52
10. "I’d Come to Your Call" – 3:29
11. "Roads" – 4:49

== Personnel ==
- Jess Williamson – acoustic guitar, piano, vocals, drum programming, photography
- Brad Cook – acoustic and electric guitar, piano, Wurlitzer, organ, synthesizers, bass guitar, synth bass, drum programming, backing vocals, engineering, mixing, production
- Phil Cook – banjo, dobro, acoustic guitar, piano, Wurlitzer, organ
- Matt Douglas – tenor saxophone, clarinet, baritone saxophone
- Deshawn Hickman – steel guitar
- Heba Kadry – mastering in New York City, New York, United States
- Mike Krol – cover photography retouching
- Matt McCaughan – acoustic drums, percussion, modular synth, drum programming
- Gerard "Jerry" Ordonez – engineering
- Alex Tults – layout, design
- Paul Voran – engineering, mixing
- Samuel Walker – cover photography

== See also ==
- List of 2023 albums
