= Bonny Doon (band) =

American indie rock band

Bonny Doon is an American indie rock band from Detroit, Michigan. The band consists of Jake Kmiecik (drums), Bill Lennox (guitar/vocals) and Bobby Colombo (guitar/vocals).

== History ==
Bonny Doon began in 2014. In the following year, they released their first collection of songs, demos they had recorded that turned into a self-titled EP. In 2017, the group announced their debut self-titled full-length album, the album was released by Salinas Records on March 10, 2017. In 2018, the band released their second full-length album titled Longwave via Woodsist Records.

In 2020, the group became the backing band for musician Waxahatchee. In September 2022, the group signed to Anti- Records and released a new song, "San Francisco", featuring Waxahatchee.

The band's third full-length album, Let There Be Music, was released on June 16, 2023.

== Discography ==
Studio albums

- Bonny Doon (2017, Salinas)
- Longwave (2018, Woodsist)
- Let There Be Music (2023, Anti-)

Demos

- Bonny Doon (2015, Salinas)
