= I Walked with You a Ways =

Studio album by Plains
- Released: October 14, 2022
- Genre: Country pop
- Length: 31:33
- Label: Anti-
- Producer: Brad Cook

Katie Crutchfield chronology
Saint Cloud (2020)	I Walked with You a Ways (2022)	Tigers Blood (2024)

Jess Williamson chronology
Sorceress (2020)	I Walked with You a Ways (2022)	Time Ain't Accidental (2023)

I Walked with You a Ways is the debut studio album by Plains, a collaborative project between Katie Crutchfield and Jess Williamson. It was released by Anti- Records on October 14, 2022.

== Background ==
Southern singer-songwriters, Katie Crutchfield (under her alias Waxahatchee) and Jess Williamson forged different paths in indie rock across the 2010s. They first met in 2017, when Crutchfield's partner, musician Kevin Morby, introduced the two at an Austin restaurant. They both developed an immediate friendship and chemistry that lent itself to future collaboration. After releasing a pair of 2020 albums at the onset of the COVID-19 pandemic (Saint Cloud and Sorceress, respectively), the two found themselves unable to tour and play shows. On long morning walks over the phone, they decided to pursue a collaborative album together.

The songs on the album were written separately, but both musicians encouraged one another in breaking away from their typical creative patterns—Williamson embraced new sonic sounds, while Crutchfield kept lyrics she may have revised. The sound of the album, which embraces country tones and traditions, was inspired by the duo's upbringing in the South. Crutchfield's work is more indebted to the timbre of 1990s pop-country, while Williamson's harkens back to classic C&W waltzes. For Williamson, artists like Dolly Parton, Linda Ronstadt and Emmylou Harris were touchstones.

Intended as a one-off project, the duo undertook their only supporting tour of the album in 2022, playing across the U.S. alongside MJ Lenderman.

== Critical reception ==
Professional ratings
Aggregate scores
Source	Rating
AnyDecentMusic?	7.7
Metacritic	81/100
Review scores
Source	Rating
American Songwriter	4/5 stars
The Guardian	4/5 stars
Paste	7.9/10
Pitchfork	8.0/10
PopMatters	8/10

Editors at AnyDecentMusic? rated this release a 7.7 out of 10, based on 13 reviews. According to the review aggregator Metacritic, I Walked with You a Ways received "universal acclaim" based on a weighted average score of 81 out of 100 from 13 critic scores. Claire Shaffer from Pitchfork considered it a "thoughtful, personalized interpretation" of its influences, and "a joy to uncover with each listen." Laura Barton from the Guardian wrote that the pair "unite new and old country traditions to create something magical," while Hal Horowitz of American Songwriter viewed it as "too special", remarking, "you'll wonder why these women don’t want to commit to future projects. The pairing is that impressive." NPR's Marissa Lorusso wrote: "Together, the two songwriters craft stories of heartbreak, empathy and self-knowledge, bolstered by a wry wisdom and rooted in their shared love of classic country sounds." A review by Ellen Johnson, penned for Paste, extolled the album: "I Walked with You a Ways is a special space where two artists who usually run solo operations can stretch their legs together [...] it’s one of the best Americana albums of the year and a powerful display of songwriting skills. And like Brunswick stew, Waffle House and the Iron Bowl, we have the South to thank for it."

== Track listing ==
No.	Title	Writer(s)	Length
1.	"Summer Sun"	Jess Williamson	2:32
2.	"Problem with It"	Katie Crutchfield	3:32
3.	"Line of Sight"	Crutchfield	3:37
4.	"Abilene"	Williamson	3:03
5.	"Hurricane"	Crutchfield	3:34
6.	"Bellafatima"	Hoyt Van Tanner	3:45
7.	"Last 2 on Earth"	Crutchfield, Kevin Morby	2:53
8.	"Easy"	Crutchfield	2:35
9.	"No Record of Wrongs"	Williamson	3:07
10.	"I Walked with You a Ways"	Williamson	2:55

== Personnel ==
Musicians

- Katie Crutchfield – lead vocals, harmony vocals, acoustic guitar
- Jess Williamson – lead vocals, harmony vocals, acoustic guitar
- Brad Cook – acoustic and electric guitar, Wurlitzer, Mellotron, bass guitar, production, additional engineering
- Phil Cook – piano, Wurlitzer, organ, Dobro, banjo, electric slide
- Spencer Tweedy – drums, percussion
- Andrew Marlin – mandolin, acoustic guitar
- Libby Rodenbough – fiddle
- Alex Farrar – electric guitar

Technical

- Jon Ashley – engineering
- Alli Rogers – additional engineering
- Alex Farrar – mixing
- Emily Lazar – mastering
- Chris Allgood – mastering
- Molly Matalon – photography
- Emily Emke-Hays – styling
- Mike Krol – design
