= Out in the Storm =

Studio album by Waxahatchee
- Released: July 14, 2017
- Studios: Miner Street Recordings (Philadelphia, Pennsylvania)
- Genres: Alternative rock; indie rock
- Length: 32:49
- Label: Merge
- Producers: John Agnello; Katie Crutchfield

Waxahatchee chronology
Ivy Tripp (2015)	Out in the Storm (2017)	Saint Cloud (2020)

Singles from Out in the Storm
- 1. "Silver" Released: April 18, 2017

Out in the Storm is the fourth studio album by American singer-songwriter Waxahatchee, released on July 14, 2017 through Merge. It features her sister Allison Crutchfield on keyboards and percussion, as well as Katie Harkin (the touring guitarist for the rock band Sleater-Kinney), Katherine Simonetti, and Ashley Arnwine. Dinosaur Jr./Sonic Youth producer John Agnello recorded the album live. The album was released digitally, on vinyl and compact disc.

== Critical reception ==
Professional ratings
Aggregate scores
Source	Rating
AnyDecentMusic?	7.9/10
Metacritic	80/100
Review scores
Source	Rating
AllMusic	4/5 stars
The A.V. Club	A
The Guardian	4/5 stars
The Irish Times	4/5 stars
The Observer	4/5 stars
Pitchfork	8.2/10
Q	3/5 stars
Rolling Stone	3.5/5 stars
Uncut	8/10
Vice	A

Out in the Storm gained a positive reception from music critics. At Metacritic, which assigns a normalized rating out of 100 to reviews from mainstream critics, the album received an average score of 80 based on 28 reviews, indicating "generally favorable reviews". In AllMusic, Marcy Donelson wrote: "With Crutchfield forthright as ever and collaborators suited to drive home her position, Out in the Storm hits with strength as much as emotion." Exclaim! writer Sarah Murphy remarked that "the results are some of Crutchfield's biggest rock'n'roll anthems yet."

== Accolades ==
Publication	Accolade	Rank	Ref.
ABC News	50 Best Albums of 2017	18	
The A.V. Club	20 Best Albums of 2017	10	
Bandcamp Daily	The Best Albums of 2017	31	
Louder Than War	Best of 2017	93	
Paste	The 50 Best Albums of 2017	18	
Pitchfork	The 20 Best Rock Albums of 2017	13	
The Philadelphia Inquirer	Best Albums of 2017	10	
Rolling Stone	50 Best Albums of 2017	14	
Stereogum	The 50 Best Albums of 2017	8	
Uproxx	Best Rock Albums of 2017	1	

== Track listing ==
All tracks are written by Katie Crutchfield.

No.	Title	Length
1.	"Never Been Wrong"	3:12
2.	"8 Ball"	2:49
3.	"Silver"	3:24
4.	"Recite Remorse"	4:38
5.	"Sparks Fly"	3:06
6.	"Brass Beam"	2:42
7.	"Hear You"	3:01
8.	"A Little More"	2:32
9.	"No Question"	3:38
10.	"Fade"	3:47
Total length:		32:49

== Personnel ==
Adapted from AllMusic.

- Katie Crutchfield – bass, guitar, keyboards, percussion, producer, vocals
- Allison Crutchfield – keyboards, percussion
- John Agnello – engineer, producer
- Ashley Arnwine – drums
- Greg Calbi – mastering
- Joey Doubek – percussion
- Katie Harkin – guitar, keyboards, percussion, piano, vocals
- Daniel Murphy – design
- Matt Schimelfenig – tracking assistant
- Daniel Shea – photography
- Katherine Simonetti – bass
