= Native State =

Studio album by Jess Williamson
- Released: January 28, 2014
- Recorded: 2013
- Studio: Eastern Sun Studios; Estuary Recording Facility
- Genre: Chamber folk; indie folk
- Length: 28:18
- Language: English
- Label: Brutal Honest

Jess Williamson chronology
Medicine Wheel/Death Songs (2011)	Native State (2014)	Heart Song (2014)

Native State is the debut studio album by American indie folk singer-songwriter Jess Williamson, released on her vanity label Brutal Honest. The album has received positive reviews.

== Reception ==
Writing for Pitchfork Media, Lindsay Zoladz gave this album a 7.4 out of 10, calling it "earthy and gothic, often seeming haunted by some invisible, vaguely tortured presence" and writes that Williamson stands out among other artist in similar genres for her strong lyrics. Eric Risch of PopMatters rated this album an 8 out of 10, writing that her music's lack of choruses helps her stand out from other folk artists and characterizing this release as "an artistic triumph".

== Track listing ==
All songs written by Jess Williamson.

1. "Blood Song" – 5:14
2. "Native State" – 4:14
3. "Medicine Wheel" – 4:19
4. "Spin the Wheel" – 4:17
5. "Field" – 2:25
6. "You Can Have Heaven on Earth" – 4:57
7. "Seventh Song" – 2:52

== Personnel ==
- Jess Williamson – guitar on "Blood Song" and "Spin the Wheel"; banjo on "Native State", "Medicine Wheel", "You Can Have Heaven on Earth", and "Seventh Song"; vocals
- Cory Allen – mastering at Altered Ear in Austin, Texas, United States
- David Boyle – mixing on "Native State", "Medicine Wheel", "Spin the Wheel", and "You Can Have Heaven on Earth" at Church House Studios
- Jason Chronis – Conn organ on "Native State", "Spin the Wheel", and "You Can Have Heaven on Earth"; keyboards on "Native State", "Spin the Wheel", and "You Can Have Heaven on Earth"; bass guitar on "Spin the Wheel" and "You Can Have Heaven on Earth"; electric guitar on "You Can Have Heaven on Earth"; Wurlitzer electric piano on "Spin the Wheel"
- Matthew Genitempo – artwork, photography
- Callie Hernandez – cello on "Native State", "Medicine Wheel", and "Field"; mountain dulcimer on "Spin the Wheel"; vocals on "Native State", "Medicine Wheel", "Spin the Wheel", and "You Can Have Heaven on Earth"; arrangement on "Spin the Wheel" and "You Can Have Heaven on Earth"
- Michael Landon – recording on "Seventh Song", mixing on "Blood Song", "Field", and "Seventh Song" at Estuary Recording Facility
- Mrs. Glass – resonator guitar on "Blood Song"
- Matt Simon – percussion on "Native State", "Medicine Wheel", "Spin the Wheel", "Field", and "You Can Have Heaven on Earth", recording on "Blood Song", "Native State", "Medicine Wheel", "Spin the Wheel", "Field", and "You Can Have Heaven on Earth"
- Eli Welbourne – synthesizer on "Medicine Wheel"

== See also ==
- List of 2014 albums
