= Right Back to It =

Single by Waxahatchee featuring MJ Lenderman

from the album Tigers Blood
- Released: January 9, 2024
- Studio: Sonic Ranch Recording Studios (Tornillo, Texas)
- Genre: Americana; country; indie rock
- Length: 4:34
- Label: ANTI-
- Songwriter: Katie Crutchfield
- Producer: Brad Cook

Waxahatchee featuring MJ Lenderman singles chronology
"Hurricane" (2022)	"Right Back to It" (2024)	"Bored" (2024)

"Right Back to It" is a song by American indie rock singer-songwriter Waxahatchee. It was released on January 9, 2024, as the lead single from her sixth studio album, Tigers Blood. The song features guest vocals from MJ Lenderman.

== Background ==
"Right Back to It" explores longstanding romance, and the ways it can waver over time but is also strengthened by its deep foundations. It was inspired by a tradition of country duets. Crutchfield explained the song's story in a press release:

I'm really interested in writing love songs that are gritty and unromantic. I wanted to make a song about the ebb and flow of a longtime love story. I thought it might feel untraditional but a little more in alignment with my experience to write about feeling insecure or foiled in some way internally, but always finding your way back to a newness or an intimacy with the same person.

She further posted about the song's genesis. She states that she first developed the song's melody while playing piano in 2021, and recorded it as a voice memo. She later completed the song during a fruitful period of writing while on tour in 2022; she specifically finished the song's arrangement before opening for Sheryl Crow and Jason Isbell at Wolf Trap in Virginia. After meeting guitarist MJ Lenderman at SXSW, producer Brad Cook arranged for him to attend the recording sessions for what became Tigers Blood in August 2022. He became a key figure in the song's sound; after hearing his harmonies on a demo of the song, Crutchfield and producer Brad Cook felt it was a turning point in making the previously "indecipherable" album: "[It was the big pivotal moment for me and Brad. We were like, ‘OK, let’s anchor everything around this feeling that we’re all having.'"

== Composition ==
Sonically, Karena Phan of the Associated Press described the song as "the best of both worlds – an Americana song that pushes and pulls between country and indie rock – but settles somewhere in the middle, a reflection of the song's lyrics."

== Music video ==
The song's music video was shot at Caddo Lake in Texas. It depicts Crutchfield and Lenderman singing the song together as they ride in a low boat. Crutchfield developed the video concept, which was an idea she had for over a decade. It was inspired by the video for the Lemonheads' "Mrs. Robinson", where they float across the canals in Groningen in the Netherlands. Crutchfield had pitched it for previous videos, but her team considered it a "logistical nightmare."

== Release and reception ==
The song debuted at number 39 on Billboard's Adult Alternative Airplay ranking. It marked Lenderman's chart debut. To promote the song, the duo appeared together on The Late Show with Stephen Colbert.

Anna Gaca of Pitchfork gave it the site's Best New Track designation, calling it "gorgeous"; the website's Andy Cush wrote: "'Right Back to It' feels like a song that will be around a long time, soundtracking first dances at weddings and final drinks at bars where the patrons get a little sentimental with their jukebox money around closing time. It’s an ode to a love that’s both tender and tough, to running wild and then settling back in, to believing that this thing you carry together is powerful enough to get you through the hard times without pretending that the hard times aren’t coming."

Rolling Stone's Angie Martoccio called it a "damn good Americana burner full of tender twang." Amanda Petrusich from The New Yorker said it was among their favorites of the year and interpreted it as "a song about feeling skittish and flickery in a relationship but trying to hold steady. It’s a gorgeous, complicated tune." Will Hermes from The New York Times considered it a standout single, and the paper's Jon Pareles agreed, ranking it among the best singles of the year.

=== Year-end lists ===
Publication	Accolade	Rank	Ref.
Exclaim!	20 Best Songs of 2024	7	
The Guardian	20 Best Songs of 2024	13	
Rolling Stone	100 Best Songs of 2024	10	
Entertainment Weekly	10 Best Songs of 2024	4	
Pitchfork	100 Best Songs of 2024	2	

== Personnel ==
Musicians

- Katie Crutchfield – vocals, acoustic guitar
- Brad Cook – bass
- Phil Cook – banjo
- Spencer Tweedy – drums, percussion
- MJ Lenderman – electric guitar, harmony vocals

Technical

- Brad Cook – production
- Emily Lazar – mastering
- Jerry Ordonez – mixing, engineering
- Natalia Chernitsky – engineering assistance
