= Sorceress (Jess Williamson album) =

Studio album by Jess Williamson
- Released: May 15, 2020
- Length: 42:49
- Label: Mexican Summer

Jess Williamson chronology
| Cosmic Wink (2018) | Sorceress (2020) | I Walked with You a Ways (2022) |

Professional ratings
Aggregate scores
| Source | Rating |
|---|---|
| Metacritic | 74/100 |
Review scores
| Source | Rating |
| AllMusic | 3.5/5 stars |
| Clash | 7/10 |
| Exclaim! | 8/10 |
| The Line of Best Fit | 8/10 |
| MusicOMH | 3.5/5 stars |
| Paste | 8.5/10 |
| Pitchfork | 7/10 |
| Sputnikmusic | 4.5/5 stars |
| Under the Radar | 7.5/10 |

Sorceress is the fourth studio album by American singer-songwriter Jess Williamson. It was released on May 15, 2020 under Mexican Summer.

== Promotion ==
=== Singles ===
On February 26, 2020, Williamson announced the release of the album, alongside the first single "Wind on Tin". The second single, "Infinite Scroll" was released on March 31, 2020. On April 30, 2020, "Smoke" was the third single to be released by Williamson.

== Critical reception ==
Sorceress was met with "generally favorable" reviews from critics. At Metacritic, which assigns a weighted average rating out of 100 to reviews from mainstream publications, this release received an average score of 74, based on 11 reviews.

== Track listing ==
Sorceress track listing
| No. | Title | Length |
|---|---|---|
| 1. | "Smoke" | 3:32 |
| 2. | "As the Birds Are" | 3:49 |
| 3. | "Wind on Tin" | 3:13 |
| 4. | "Sorceress" | 4:40 |
| 5. | "Infinite Scroll" | 4:13 |
| 6. | "Love's Not Hard to Find" | 3:48 |
| 7. | "How Ya Lonesome" | 4:49 |
| 8. | "Rosaries at the Border" | 3:59 |
| 9. | "Ponies in Town" | 3:47 |
| 10. | "Harm None" | 3:19 |
| 11. | "Gulf of Mexico" | 4:08 |

== Charts ==
Chart performance for Sorceress
| Chart (2020) | Peak position |
|---|---|
| UK Americana Albums (Official Charts) | 15 |
