= Saint Cloud (album) =

Studio album by Waxahatchee
- Released: March 27, 2020
- Studios: Sonic Ranch (Tornillo, Texas); Long Pond (Stuyvesant, New York)
- Genres: Indie rock, alt country, Americana
- Length: 40:06
- Label: Merge
- Producer: Brad Cook

Waxahatchee chronology
Out in the Storm (2017)	Saint Cloud (2020)	I Walked with You a Ways (2022)

Saint Cloud is the fifth studio album by American singer-songwriter Waxahatchee, released on March 27, 2020, by Merge Records. Released at the onset of the global coronavirus pandemic, Saint Cloud received universal acclaim from music critics, who praised its depth and mellow sound. Initially unable to tour behind the album, Waxahatchee embarked on a supporting tour in 2021.

== Background and recording ==
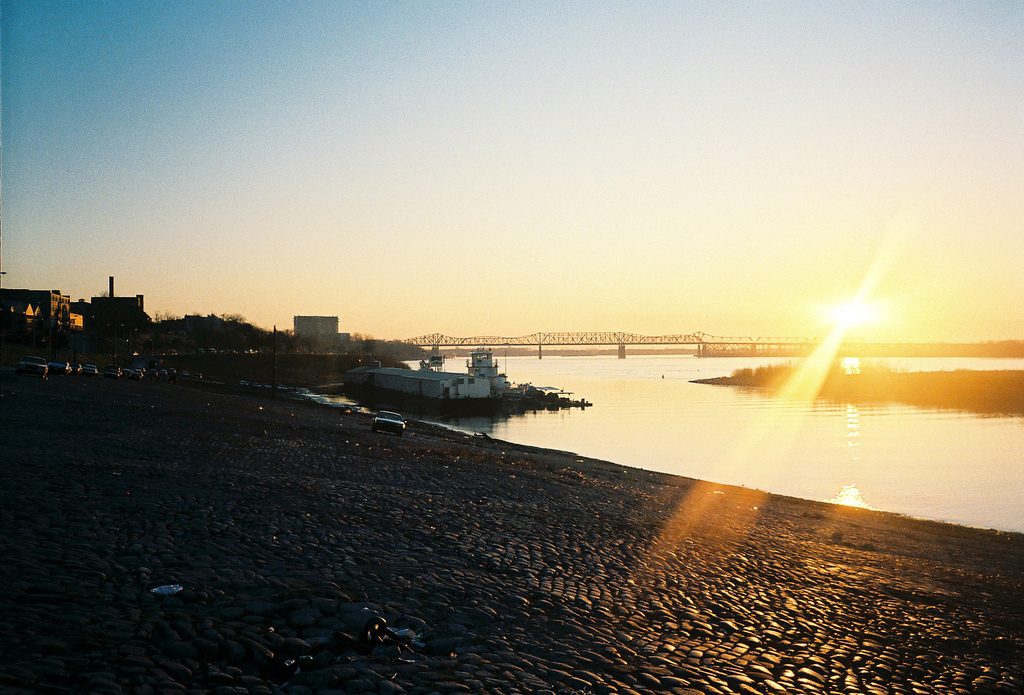
Crutchfield spoke about developing "Fire" after viewing the sunset over the Mississippi while traveling.

After many years of touring and releasing albums, Waxahatchee frontwoman Katie Crutchfield came to a point to where she needed a break. She had begun to struggle with alcoholism, which became apparent during the promotional tour for her previous album, Out in the Storm (2017). She made the decision to choose sobriety after hitting a particularly low point at Primavera Sound in Barcelona. In between albums, she released a stopgap EP, Great Thunder, hinting at a burgeoning folk sound.

Saint Cloud was recorded with producer Brad Cook across two studios, Sonic Ranch in Tornillo, Texas and Long Pond in Stuyvesant, New York over the summer of 2019. Crutchfield utilized members of the Michigan band Bonny Doon as her backing band. Crutchfield intentionally took her time developing the album, and found it hard to write initially. When the inspiration came, much of its content was developed at a quick pace. Its lyricism was heavily inspired by the work of Lucinda Williams, and mainly tackles themes of "addiction and codependency". Crutchfield titled the album and its titular song after her father's hometown of St. Cloud, Florida, a small community outside of Orlando.

She wrote the bulk of the songs at her home in Kansas City, where she lived with her partner Kevin Morby. She noted that Morby would give her positive feedback when she shared the material.

The opening track, "Oxbow", grew from a moment in Barcelona during Primavera Sound's 2018 edition when Crutchfield "woke up one day and said, 'I'm done with this forever'" and "got sober". Crutchfield reflected that "Fire" came from "the idea of writing a song that feels like a traditional song to a romantic partner, but then having that other person be me" saying that it "feels like an anthem for self-acceptance and self-love". Crutchfield described "Lilacs" as being "a reminder that none of us are ever done doing work. You have to keep taking care of yourself forever. You're never going to have an answer." Crutchfield wrote "The Eye" while saying in Portugal, describing it as "loosely inspired by Leonard Cohen's "Tower of Song"". Crutchfield framed "The Eye" as "a love song about being an artist and being with another artist" and how "these two brains meld" through the creative process which she related to both her sister Allison and her partner Kevin.

== Music ==
Saint Cloud is considered a country/Americana album, and also contains elements of punk rock and folk music. Ellen Johnson of Paste Magazine wrote: "If Out in the Storm was a tornado of sound and emotion, Saint Cloud is the calm that comes afterwards."

== Artwork ==
Ellen Johnson of Paste Magazine said: "On the album cover, Crutchfield, dressed in a billowy baby-blue frock, sprawls across an old Ford truck bearing a license plate from her native Alabama."

== Critical reception ==
Professional ratings
Aggregate scores
Source	Rating
AnyDecentMusic?	8.4/10
Metacritic	88/100
Review scores
Source	Rating
AllMusic	4/5 stars
And It Don't Stop	A−
The Guardian	5/5 stars
The Independent	5/5 stars
NME	4/5 stars
The Observer	3/5 stars
Pitchfork	8.7/10
Q	4/5 stars
Rolling Stone	4/5 stars
Uncut	8/10

Saint Cloud was released at the onset of the COVID-19 pandemic in the U.S., which affected listeners and their interpretation of the album. Chris Riemenschneider, for Minneapolis' Star Tribune, called it "a perfect listening companion through a year and a half of lockdown, as comforting as it was exhilarating."

Saint Cloud was received rapturously by music critics, who praised the album's sincerity and tone. Robert Christgau reviewed the album in his "Consumer Guide" column in July 2020. While suggesting that the "recovery songs" toward the album's end recount life experiences not relatable for the average listener, he applauded Crutchfield's performance through the opening series of "love/relationship/self-knowledge songs", with "her guitar parts echoing readymades so approximately and unaffectedly they sound fresh all over again, her soft voice so casual and personable and smart".

=== Accolades ===
Accolades for Saint Cloud
Publication	Accolade	Rank	Ref.
Beats Per Minute	Top 50 Albums of 2020	36	
Consequence of Sound	Top 50 Albums of 2020	6	
Double J	Top 50 Albums of 2020	6	
Exclaim!	Top 50 Albums of 2020	18	
Gigwise	Top 51 Albums of 2020	26	
The Line of Best Fit	Top 50 Albums of 2020	12	
NPR	The 50 Best Albums of 2020	47	
Paste	The 50 Best Albums of 2020	2	
Pitchfork	The 50 Best Albums of 2020	2	
PopMatters	The 60 Best Albums of 2020	9	
Rolling Stone	The 50 Best Albums of 2020	7	
The Skinny	Top 10 Albums of 2020	6	
Slant Magazine	Top 50 Albums of 2020	12	
Stereogum	Stereogum's 50 Best Albums of 2020 – Mid-Year	2	
Under the Radar	Under the Radar's Top 100 Albums of 2020	6	
Uproxx	The Best Albums and Songs of 2020	7	
The Wild Honey Pie	Top 30 Albums of 2020	2	

== Track listing ==
All tracks are written by Katie Crutchfield and produced by Brad Cook, except where noted.

Saint Cloud track listing
No.	Title	Length
1.	"Oxbow"	2:53
2.	"Can't Do Much"	3:44
3.	"Fire"	3:38
4.	"Lilacs"	3:15
5.	"The Eye"	4:18
6.	"Hell"	3:00
7.	"Witches"	2:48
8.	"War"	3:10
9.	"Arkadelphia"	4:50
10.	"Ruby Falls"	3:50
11.	"Saint Cloud"	4:40
Total length:		40:06

Saint Cloud +3 track listing
No.	Title	Writer(s)	Producer(s)	Length
12.	"Fruits of My Labor"	Lucinda Williams	Crutchfield; Cook	5:05
13.	"Light of a Clear Blue Morning"	Dolly Parton	Crutchfield; Cook	4:38
14.	"Streets of Philadelphia"	Bruce Springsteen	Crutchfield; Cook	4:09
Total length:				53:58

== Personnel ==
Musicians

- Katie Crutchfield – vocals, acoustic guitar, piano, keyboards
- Brad Cook – bass, acoustic guitar, piano, keyboards, synthesizer
- Bobby Colombo – electric guitar, acoustic guitar, keyboards
- Bill Lennox – electric guitar, acoustic guitar, keyboards, percussion, vocals
- Nick Kinsey – drums, percussion
- Josh Kaufman – electric guitar, piano, organ, percussion

Technical personnel

- Brad Cook – production
- Jerry Ordonez – engineering
- Jon Low – additional engineering, mixing
- Brent Lambert – mastering

Artwork

- Molly Matalon – photos
- Andreina Byrne – set production
- Mike Krol – design

== Charts ==
Sales chart performance for Saint Cloud
Chart (2020)	Peak position
Scottish Albums (Official Charts)	24
UK Independent Albums (Official Charts)	7
US Billboard 200	140
US Americana/Folk Albums (Billboard)	2
US Independent Albums (Billboard)	17
US Top Alternative Albums (Billboard)	6
US Top Rock Albums (Billboard)	19
