= Heart Song =

Studio album by Jess Williamson
- Released: November 4, 2016
- Studio: Cacophany Recorders in Austin, Texas, United States
- Genre: Indie folk
- Length: 38:15
- Language: English
- Label: Brutal Honest
- Producer: Erik Wofford

Jess Williamson chronology
Native State (2014)	Heart Song (2016)	Cosmic Wink (2018)

Heart Song is the second studio album by American indie folk singer-songwriter Jess Williamson, released on her vanity label Brutal Honest. The album has received positive reviews.

== Reception ==
According to the review aggregator Metacritic, Heart Song received "universal acclaim" based on a weighted average score of 81 out of 100 from five critic scores. In Exclaim!, Peter Ellman scored this album a 9 out of 10, for the lyrical strength on the songs, stating that "by carving out her insides, she demonstrates agency, action and an embittered sense of hope". Benjamin Schein of Pitchfork rated Heart Song a 7.7 out of 10, for the strength of Williamson's writing and her "stunning" voice, calling the release "so strong and captivating that it pulls the more experimental moments into the center as well".

== Track listing ==
All songs written by Jess Williamson.

1. "Say It" – 6:14
2. "White Bed" – 3:57
3. "Heart Song" – 7:00
4. "Snake Song" – 4:00
5. "See You in a Dream" – 4:54
6. "Last Word" – 7:28
7. "Devils Girl" – 4:42

== Personnel ==
- Jess Williamson – guitar, vocals, arrangement
- Cory Allen – mastering at Altered Ear in Austin, Texas, United States
- Larry Crane – mixing at Jackpot Recording Studio, Portland, Oregon, United States
- Jesse Kees – bass guitar, keyboards, acoustic guitar, arrangement, recording on "Snake Song" and "Devil's Girl" at Kee's home studio in Austin, Texas, United States
- Mrs. Glass – resonator guitar on "White Bed"
- Shane Renfro – guitar, keyboards, arrangement
- Andrew Stevens – percussion, piano, arrangement, recording on "Snake Song" and "Devil's Girl"
- Erik Wofford – engineering on "Say It", "White Bed", "Heart Song", "See You in a Dream", and "Last Word", production at Cacophany Recorders in Austin, Texas, United States

== See also ==
- List of 2016 albums
