= Cosmic Wink =

Studio album by Jess Williamson
- Released: May 11, 2018
- Genre: Indie folk
- Length: 37:20
- Language: English
- Label: Mexican Summer
- Producer: Dan Duszynski; Shane Renfro

Jess Williamson chronology
| Heart Song (2016) | Cosmic Wink (2018) | Sorceress (2020) |

Professional ratings
Review scores
| Source | Rating |
|---|---|
| Paste | 8.2/10 |
| The Guardian | 3/5 stars |
| Loud and Quiet | 7/10 |
| DIY | 3/5 stars |

Cosmic Wink is the third studio album by American indie folk singer-songwriter Jess Williamson, released by Mexican Summer. The album has received positive reviews.

== Reception ==
Editors at AnyDecentMusic? rated this album a 6.8 out of 10, based on nine reviews. According to the review aggregator Metacritic, Cosmic Wink received "generally favorable reviews" based on a weighted average score of 77 out of 100 from eight critic scores. Rachel Rascoe of The Austin Chronicle gave Cosmic Wink 3.5 out of 5 stars, writing that "the oft-tread subject of love isn't overdone, but rather revived.". In The Independent, Nick Hasted scored this album 4 out of 5, writing that the album's "echoing sound allows a sort of resonant, gigantic intimacy over rhythms of mostly languid steadiness". Writing for Loud and Quiet, Max Pilley rated this release 7 out of 10, summing up, "it’s hard to imagine that many people from any walk of life will listen and fail to find something to admire". Emily Mackay of The Observer gave Cosmic Wink 3 out of 5 stars, comparing Williamson favorably to Cat Power and Neil Young. Paste's Madison Desler rated this release an 8.2 out of 10, stating that "Williamson wrings new insight and feeling out of" love songs, with lyrics that are "free of sappiness or the numbing effect of anything trite". Hannah Flint of Q gave Cosmic Wink 3 out of 5 stars, writing that Williamson finds her voice on this release and "her melodies hit you right in the heart".

== Track listing ==
All songs written by Jess Williamson, except where noted.

1. "I See the White" (Shane Renfro and Williamson) – 3:24
2. "Awakening Baby" – 2:41
3. "White Bird" – 3:47
4. "Wild Rain" – 4:21
5. "Thunder Song" – 3:36
6. "Mama Proud" – 5:56
7. "Dream State" (Renfro and Williamson) – 4:28
8. "Forever" – 4:50
9. "Love on the Piano" (Renfro and Williamson) – 4:16

== Personnel ==
"I See the White"

- Jess Williamson – electric guitar, percussion, vocals
- Dan Duszynski – organ
- Tiffanie Lanmon – drums, percussion
- Shane Renfro – acoustic guitar, piano, backing vocals
- Meredith Stoner – bass guitar

"Awakening Baby"

- Jess Williamson – 12-string guitar, vocals
- Tiffanie Lanmon – drums, percussion
- Shane Renfro – electric guitar
- Meredith Stoner – bass guitar

"White Bird"

- Jess Williamson – electric guitar, vocals
- Tiffanie Lanmon – drums, percussion
- Shane Renfro – electric guitar, organ, piano, backing vocals
- Meredith Stoner – bass guitar

"Wild Rain"

- Jess Williamson – acoustic guitar, vocals
- Dan Duszynski – bass guitar, percussion, Rhodes electric piano
- Tiffanie Lanmon – drums, percussion
- Shane Renfro – electric guitar, keyboards

"Thunder Song"

- Jess Williamson – electric guitar, vocals
- Tiffanie Lanmon – drums, percussion
- Shane Renfro – electric guitar, keyboards
- Meredith Stoner – bass guitar

"Mama Proud"

- Jess Williamson – electric guitar, vocals
- Shane Renfro – acoustic guitar, electric guitar, organ
- Dan Duszynski – baritone guitar, backing vocals
- Tiffanie Lanmon – drums, keyboards, percussion

"Dream State"

- Jess Williamson – electric guitar, vocals
- Tiffanie Lanmon – drums, percussion
- Shane Renfro – electric guitar, Rhodes electric piano, keyboards, backing vocals
- Meredith Stoner – bass guitar

"Forever"

- Jess Williamson – electric guitar, vocals
- Dan Duszynski – bass guitar, organ
- Tiffanie Lanmon – clarinet, drums, percussion
- Shane Renfro – electric guitar, keyboards

"Love on the Piano"

- Jess Williamson – acoustic guitar, vocals
- Shane Renfro – piano

Technical personnel

- Jess Williamson – design
- Dan Duszynski – recording, mixing, production
- Bailey Elder – illustration, design
- Jeff Lipton – mastering
- Shane Renfro – cover, production

== See also ==
- List of 2018 albums
