= Ivy Tripp =

Studio album by Waxahatchee
- Released: April 7, 2015
- Studio: Wherever Audio, Holbrook, New York
- Genre: Indie rock, indie folk
- Length: 37:01
- Label: Merge, Wichita Recordings
- Producer: Kyle Gilbride, Keith Spencer, Katie Crutchfield

Waxahatchee chronology
Cerulean Salt (2013)	Ivy Tripp (2015)	Out in the Storm (2017)

Singles from Ivy Tripp
- 1. "Air" Released: January 12, 2015; 2. "Under a Rock" Released: February 17, 2015; 3. "La Loose" Released: June 1, 2015

Ivy Tripp is the third studio album by American indie musician Waxahatchee, released on April 7, 2015, on Merge Records domestically, and Wichita Recordings internationally. Katie Crutchfield (aka Waxahatchee) produced the album with Kyle Gilbride and Keith Spencer.

== Background and recording ==
After the release of Cerulean Salt (2013), Crutchfield split amicably with her label, Don Giovanni Records. She and Spencer isolated themselves for almost a year in a house in Holbrook, Long Island. Crutchfield recalled, "I just got to hide out and make a record. At my own pace. That was important to me." In a press release, she said of the album: "The title Ivy Tripp is really just a term I made up for directionless-ness, specifically of the 20-something, 30-something, 40-something of today, lacking regard for the complaisant life path of our parents and grandparents." The extra "p" in Tripp is a reference to a friend of Crutchfield's who had died.

Musically, Crutchfield described the album as "poppier" than her previous work. The only other musicians on the album are Spencer and Gilbride; the trio also produced the album together. Crutchfield explained: "We had synthesizers and tons of keyboards and 12-string guitars and acoustic guitars set aside so that we could put whatever on it that we thought would be cool. That part of the record was really collaborative. Keith and Kyle and I kind of all worked together to build the songs up."

== Reception ==
Professional ratings
Aggregate scores
Source	Rating
AnyDecentMusic?	7.8/10
Metacritic	81/100
Review scores
Source	Rating
AllMusic	4/5 stars
The A.V. Club	B+
Chicago Tribune	3/4 stars
The Guardian	4/5 stars
Mojo	4/5 stars
NME	8/10
Pitchfork	8.1/10
Q	4/5 stars
Rolling Stone	3.5/5 stars
Spin	8/10

Ivy Tripp has received acclaim from music critics. At Metacritic, which assigns a normalized rating out of 100 to reviews from mainstream critics, the album received an average score of 81 based on 27 reviews, indicating "universal acclaim".

In a review of the album, Sarah Grant of Rolling Stone wrote: "Aimlessness can be a rite of passage for twentysomethings, and Crutchfield shines brightest when she transforms that fear into frenetic pop joy." Harriet Gibsone of The Guardian said that Crutchfield "maintains a sense of sincerity throughout, letting her purge her own thoughts while providing a sanctuary for her listeners." Annie Zaleski of Spin remarked: "Although the record is no less sparse than her previous albums, it boasts far more diverse instrumental detail" and that "despite more intricate arrangements and a broader palette of sounds, Ivy Tripp is a perfectly logical progression along the Waxahatchee continuum."

Pitchfork's Brandon Stosuy noted that "many of Ivy Tripp's song titles—'The Dirt', 'Half Moon', 'Bonfire'—are dusky and colored like earth tones, and that's the setting of the songs as well: moments in transition, the realm between night and day and relationships that have that same kind of momentary feeling." Sarah Murphy of Exclaim! said it's "not a record about being in love or and it's not a record about getting your heart broken; it's about the foggy, messy tangle of the feelings in between. And they've never sounded so good." William Tomer of The 405 commented that "[Crutchfield] is already making her mark as one of America's premier songwriters and she shows no signs of stopping."

=== Accolades ===
Publication	Accolade	Year	Rank
The A.V. Club	The 15 Best Albums of 2015	2015	8
Stereogum	The 50 Best Albums of 2015	2015	19
Rolling Stone	Top 20 Albums of 2015	2015	15

== Track listing ==
All tracks are written by Katie Crutchfield.

No.	Title	Length
1.	"Breathless"	4:45
2.	"Under a Rock"	2:08
3.	"Poison"	2:10
4.	"La Loose"	3:13
5.	"Stale by Noon"	2:44
6.	"The Dirt"	2:02
7.	"Blue"	2:06
8.	"Air"	3:11
9.	"<"	3:20
10.	"Grey Hair"	1:45
11.	"Summer of Love"	2:20
12.	"Half Moon"	3:20
13.	"Bonfire"	5:00

== Personnel ==
=== Musicians ===
- Katie Crutchfield – guitar, keys, synth, vocals
- Kyle Gilbride – guitar, keys, synth, tambourine
- Keith Spencer - guitar, bass, drums, keys

=== Recording ===
- Kyle Gilbride - producer, engineer
- Keith Spencer - producer
- Katie Crutchfield - producer

=== Artwork ===
- Jesse Riggins - photography
- Maggie Fost - design

== Charts ==
Chart (2015)	Peak position
US Billboard 200	153
