= Cerulean Salt =

Studio album by Waxahatchee
- Released: March 5, 2013
- Recorded: September–November 2012 in West Philadelphia
- Genres: Indie rock, indie folk
- Length: 32:30
- Label: Don Giovanni Records
- Producers: Kyle Gilbride, Keith Spencer, Katie Crutchfield, and Jacob

Waxahatchee chronology
American Weekend (2012)	Cerulean Salt (2013)	Ivy Tripp (2015)

Cerulean Salt is the second studio album by American indie musician Waxahatchee, released on March 5, 2013, on Don Giovanni Records. Co-produced by Swearin' members Kyle Gilbride and Keith Spencer, the album was recorded in primary recording artist Katie Crutchfield's basement.

The album was recognized as one of The 100 Best Albums of the Decade So Far, a list published by Pitchfork Media in August 2014.

== Background and recording ==
Following the release of Waxahatchee's debut album, American Weekend (2012), Katie Crutchfield toured extensively as a duo, with her friend Katherine: "It was just the two of us, which was also kind of hard staying away from pretty much everybody that I know for that long. It was really hard, then I came home and kind of worked on writing and flushing out some of the new songs and then I went out on tour again with Swearin' for the same amount of time, for two months, so that was crazy."

In April 2012, Crutchfield began working on new material with boyfriend and Swearin' band member Keith Spencer: "I went to Alabama with my boyfriend and he kinda' played drums with me, and we sort of fleshed out everything and decided what needed drums, what didn’t need drums, and reworked a lot of the songs I had." Five months later, Crutchfield and Spencer began recording Cerulean Salt, alongside Swearin' members Kyle Gilbride and Allison Crutchfield: "We recorded it here at my house with Kyle [Gilbride]. And Keith and Kyle are both in Swearin,’ which is my sister's band, and they sort of, we all kind of, still like Allison is a part of my life and her entire band is an everyday part of my life, so it still felt very comfortable. We recorded it here in my basement and Kyle and Allison and Keith and another roommate of ours Sam [Cook-Parrott] all played on it."

Crutchfield praised the collaborative recording sessions, noting: "I feel like I have really talented friends and wanted to bounce ideas off them. Like, two heads are better than one, four are better than two, and maybe if we all got together on this they could present ideas to me that I had never thought of. That was the sort of process on this record that, honestly, is completely different than American Weekend in every possible way."

== Writing and composition ==
Songwriter and primary recording artist Katie Crutchfield wrote Cerulean Salt over the course of a year, stating: "For me, I’ve always been, like, I can just spit out a bunch of songs really quickly. But this was a much slower, more vigilant, meticulous process."

The album's lyrical content is primarily concerned with songwriter and recording artist Katie Crutchfield's views on adulthood: "A lot of it is about realizing that your childhood is over, that your innocence is gone. When you're a kid, you're always happy, and everything's good. And then you realize, 'That's never gonna be how I am again.' [...] It's not sad as much as it is these weird existential realizations, like, 'This is life, nothing matters.'"

== Reception ==
Professional ratings
Aggregate scores
Source	Rating
AnyDecentMusic?	7.5/10
Metacritic	79/100
Review scores
Source	Rating
AllMusic	4/5 stars
The Guardian	3/5 stars
The Irish Times	4/5 stars
Mojo	4/5 stars
MSN Music (Expert Witness)	A−
NME	8/10
Pitchfork	8.4/10
Q	4/5 stars
Rolling Stone	3.5/5 stars
Spin	8/10

Pitchfork's Lindsay Zoladz applauded Salt as "the work of a songwriter skilled enough to make introspection not self-centered, but generous." She wrote that the album showed Katie Crutchfield as "a new songwriting voice to reckon with", aligning its "blazingly honest [and] hyper-personal quality" with musicians Cat Power, Elliott Smith, and Liz Phair. It was awarded the site's "Best New Music" accolade. Jim Carroll for The Irish Times called Crutchfield's songwriting "confident, audacious, and natural" and singled out several songs as "lyrically strong and honest, and perfectly pitched."

The album reached number one on the Official Record Store Chart for the week of July 13, 2013. The A.V. Club ranked the record at a high number seven on their year end list. The album was voted number 36 on Rolling Stone's 50 Best Albums of 2013 list. Pitchfork ranked the album number 22 on their year end list. Spin also ranked the album highly, placing it at number 20 on their top album list.

=== Legacy ===
Cerulean Salt was included on several decade-end lists. It placed number 61 on Rolling Stone's list, with J. Bernstein writing that it solidified Katie Crutchfield as "one of her generation's foremost chroniclers of interior turmoil." They also dubbed it "a lasting document" of Philadelphia's "subdued" take on indie rock music during the 2010s. Ranking it number 107 on their list, BrooklynVegan dubbed the album "a touchstone" for the fusion of emo, folk, indie rock, and punk styles occurring that decade.

=== Accolades ===
Critical rankings for Cerulean Salt
Publication	Country	Type	List	Year	Rank	Ref.
BrooklynVegan	United States	Decade-end	100 Best Punk & Emo Albums of the 2010s	2019	18	
BrooklynVegan	United States	Decade-end	141 Best Albums of the 2010s	2019	107	
Paste	United States	Decade-end	The 50 Best Indie Rock Albums of the 2010s	2019	28	
Rolling Stone	United States	Decade-end	The 100 Best Albums of the 2010s	2019	61	
Stereogum	United States	Decade-end	The 100 Best Albums Of The 2010s	2019	47	
Paste	United States	All-time	The 100 Best Indie Folk Albums of All Time	2020	10	

== Track listing ==
1. "Hollow Bedroom" – 1:52
2. "Dixie Cups and Jars" – 3:36
3. "Lips and Limbs" – 2:37
4. "Blue Pt. II" – 2:19
5. "Brother Bryan" – 2:36
6. "Coast to Coast" – 1:46
7. "Tangled Envisioning" – 2:27
8. "Misery Over Dispute" – 1:45
9. "Lively" – 2:32
10. "Waiting" – 1:41
11. "Swan Dive" – 3:14
12. "Peace and Quiet" – 2:37
13. "You're Damaged" – 3:33

== Personnel ==
=== Musicians ===
- Katie Crutchfield - vocals, various instruments
- Keith Spencer - drums (3, 5, 6, 8, 9, 10, 11 and 12), bass guitar (2, 5 and 7), guitar (2)
- Kyle Gilbride - bass guitar (3, 6 and 10), guitar (3), synth (12), backing vocals (9)
- Allison Crutchfield - drums (2), vocals (4)
- Sam Cook-Parrott - bass guitar (12), backing vocals (12)

=== Recording personnel ===
- Kyle Gilbride - producer, engineer
- Keith Spencer - producer
- Katie Crutchfield - producer
- Sam Cook-Parrott - additional production
- Allison Crutchfield - additional production

=== Artwork ===
- Ryan Russell - art direction, layout and photography
- Katie Crutchfield - art direction
