= Power Chords (album) =

Studio album by Mike Krol
- Released: January 25, 2019
- Studios: Quad Studios Nashville, Nashville, Tennessee, USA
- Length: 33:37
- Producer: Mike McCarthy

Mike Krol chronology
Turkey (2015)	Power Chords (2019)

Professional ratings
Aggregate scores
Source	Rating
AnyDecentMusic?	7.1/10
Metacritic	73/100
Review scores
Source	Rating
The 405	6.5/10
AllMusic	3.5/5 stars
Exclaim!	8/10
Paste	7.5/10
Pitchfork	7.8/10
Under the Radar	7/10

Power Chords is the fourth studio album by American singer-songwriter Mike Krol. It was released on January 25, 2019, through Merge Records.

== Track listing ==
No.	Title	Length
1.	"Power Chords"	3:22
2.	"What's the Rhythm"	2:31
3.	"An Ambulance"	3:15
4.	"Little Drama"	2:48
5.	"Left for Dead"	2:40
6.	"Blue and Pink"	3:32
7.	"I Wonder"	3:21
8.	"Wasted Memory"	2:04
9.	"Nothing to Yell About"	2:56
10.	"Arrow in My Heart"	3:36
11.	"The End"	3:32
Total length:		33:37
