= Waxahatchee =

American indie music project

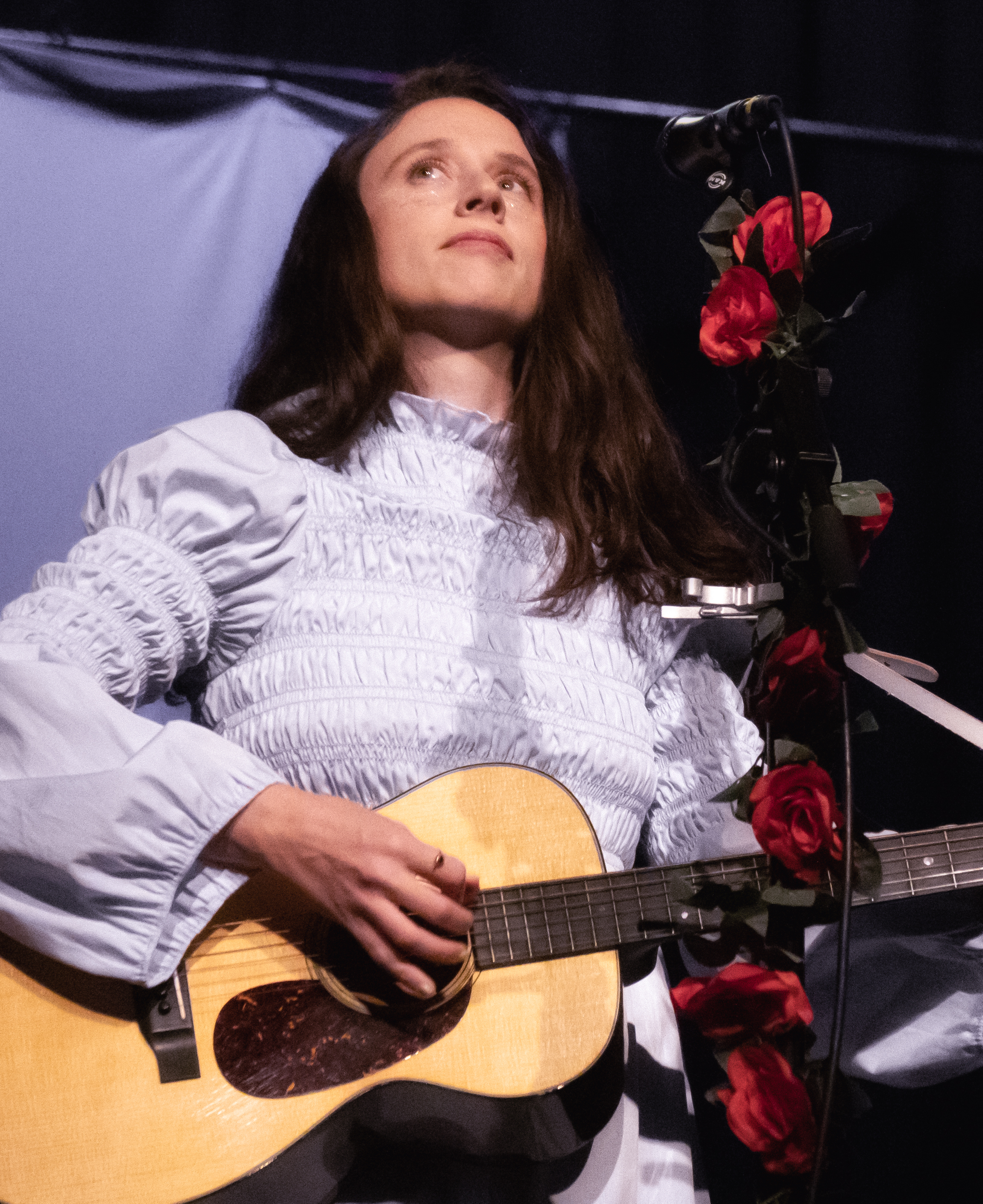
- Waxahatchee performing at the Moore Theatre in Seattle, Washington, in 2021

Background information
- Origin: Birmingham, Alabama, U.S.
- Genres: Indie rock; indie folk; country
- Years active: 2010–present
- Labels: Anti-; Merge; Don Giovanni; Wichita; Dead Oceans
- Spinoffs: Plains, Snocaps
- Spinoff of: P.S. Eliot
- Members: Katie Crutchfield
- Website: waxahatchee.com

Waxahatchee is an American indie music project, formed in 2010 by American singer-songwriter Kathryn Crutchfield (born January 4, 1989), known professionally as Katie Crutchfield, following the breakup of her previous band P.S. Eliot. The band is named after Waxahatchee Creek in Alabama, where Crutchfield grew up. Originally an acoustic solo project, her recordings now tend to involve a full backing band.

As Waxahatchee, she has released six solo studio albums to date: American Weekend (2012), Cerulean Salt (2013), Ivy Tripp (2015), Out in the Storm (2017), Saint Cloud (2020) and Tigers Blood (2024), which was nominated for the 2025 Grammy Award for Best Americana Album. Outside of Waxahatchee, Crutchfield is a member of alternative country duo Plains, alongside Jess Williamson, and the indie rock band Snocaps, which features her twin sister Allison Crutchfield, MJ Lenderman and Brad Cook.

== History ==
=== 2010–2017: American Weekend, Cerulean Salt, and Ivy Tripp ===
While a member of P.S. Eliot, a band formed with her twin sister Allison, Crutchfield released her first music as Waxahatchee as a cassette. Her bedroom-recorded debut album, American Weekend, was recorded in 2011 and released on Don Giovanni Records in 2012. Crutchfield wrote and recorded the album in one week at her family home in Birmingham, Alabama. Her lyrics focused on personal relationships, devastation and longing.

The album garnered positive reviews and was named a top album of 2012 by Dusted magazine. "Be Good" was a song of the day on National Public Radio, and listed as one of the best 50 songs of 2012. "Catfish" was featured on an episode of the podcast Welcome to Night Vale.

Waxahatchee's second album, Cerulean Salt, was released in March 2013 through Don Giovanni Records in the United States, and four months later on Wichita Recordings in the U.K. The critically acclaimed album reached number one on the Official Record Store Chart in July 2013 and scored 8.4 on Pitchfork. Waxahatchee supported Tegan And Sara on their U.K. tour, before playing a headline U.K. tour in October that same year.

In 2015 Crutchfield signed to Merge Records, which released her third album, Ivy Tripp, in April of that year. Waxahatchee toured non-stop for the rest of 2015, including tours with Kurt Vile and the Violators and Sleater Kinney.

=== 2017–present: Out in the Storm, Saint Cloud, Plains, Tigers Blood and Snocaps ===
In 2017, Waxahatchee toured with The New Pornographers, and also embarked on a headlining tour around the United States. In the autumn months the band toured parts of Europe, including several festival dates. Waxahatchee's fourth album, Out in the Storm, was released on July 14, 2017, on Merge Records. It moves away from the lo-fi sound of previous albums, partly due to the guidance of co-producer John Agnello. It was recorded in the Miner Street Recordings studio with her former touring band. Sam Sodomsky of Pitchfork wrote of "Katie Crutchfield’s sharp, gorgeous songwriting", "immersive" band sound and "songs that play like fiery exorcisms" in a review of the album. Waxahatchee opened Jawbreaker's first Los Angeles shows in 22 years at the Hollywood Palladium on March 10, 2018, and in New York City at Brooklyn Steel on February 27, 2018.

In January 2020, Waxahatchee announced her fifth album, Saint Cloud, and released a single called "Fire". The album was recorded in 2019 at Sonic Ranch in Texas and at Long Pond in Stuyvesant, New York with producer Brad Cook. The album features Detroit-based band Bonny Doon. On February 18, Waxahatchee released the single "Lilacs" and on March 16, she released the single "Can't Do Much." In a comprehensive interview with Will Gottsegen at Billboard, she spoke about her musical influences and recent sobriety. The record made it at No. 7 on Billboard's Emerging Artists chart of April 2020, No. 1 on Heatseekers Albums, No. 2 on Americana/Folk Albums and No. 6 on Alternative Albums with 7,000 units. At the same time, the single "Lilacs" ranked at No. 36 on the Adult Alternative Songs airplay chart.

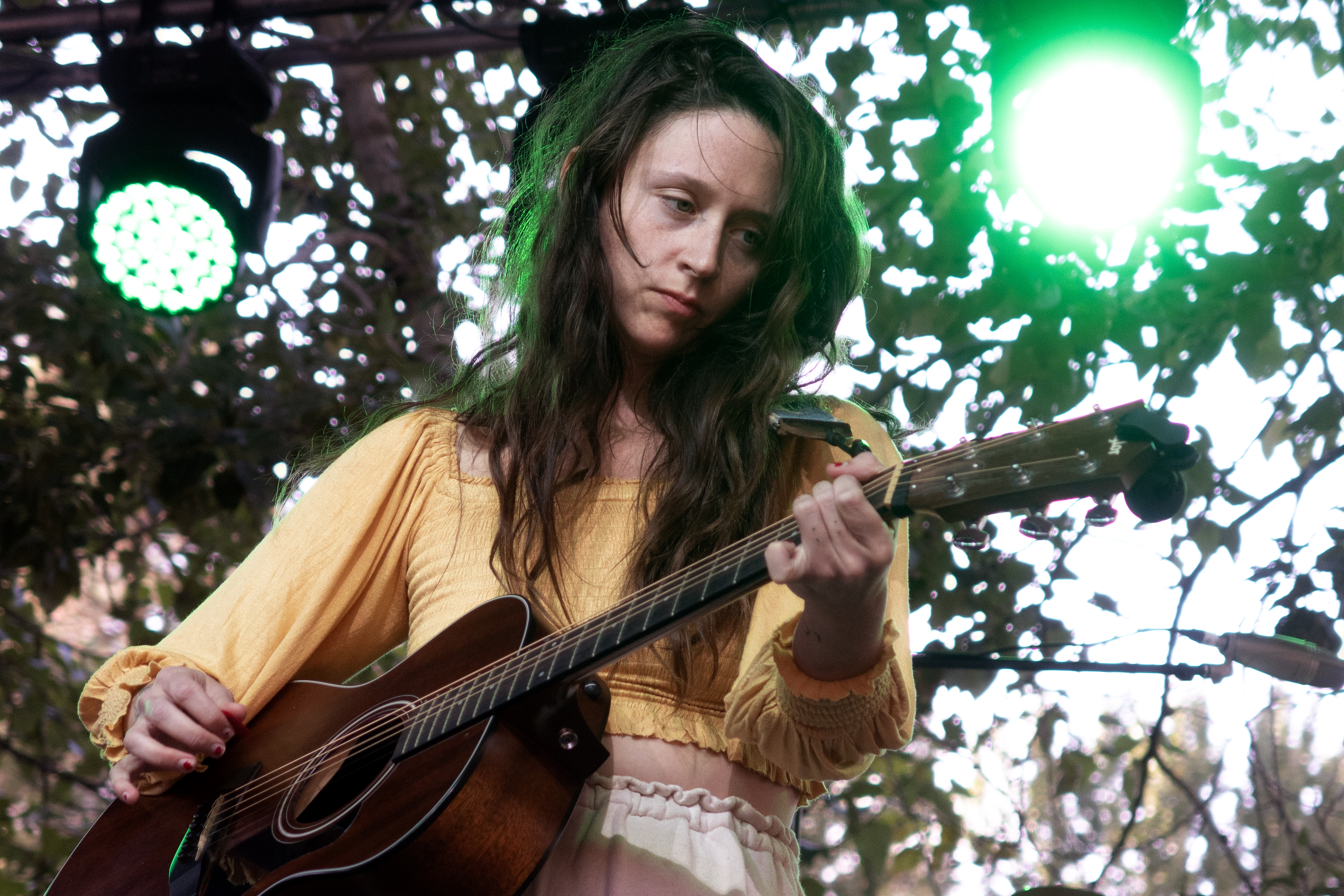
Waxahatchee performing at The Huichica festival near Walla Walla, Washington in 2019.

In the first months of the COVID-19 pandemic in 2020, Crutchfield performed a series of live streamed concerts comprising all the songs from one of her studio albums. She announced the series as a deep dive into her backlist in an attempt to reach out to her fans and also to generate some income after the pandemic caused suspension of all touring.

In 2021, Waxahatchee performed at the Newport Folk Festival as well the Mempho Music Festival in the Radians Amphitheater of Memphis, Tennessee. Her album Saint Cloud won the Libera Awards 2021 as Best Country Record.

In July 2022, Crutchfield announced Plains, a collaboration project with singer-songwriter Jess Williamson. Their debut album, I Walked with You a Ways, was released in October 2022.

In December 2023, Waxahatchee made a guest appearance on the song "Pretty Paper" on the Philly Specials album A Philly Special Christmas Special. The following month, she announced that the sixth Waxahatchee album Tigers Blood would be released in March 2024. To coincide with the announcement, the album's lead single "Right Back to It" was released. It features harmonies from MJ Lenderman. Waxahatchee toured in support of the album in 2024, traveling on a tour bus and playing 2,500-capacity theaters, having declined opportunities to play larger venues. Waxahatchee has played the 2025 Barcelona and Porto editions of Primavera Sound.

In October 2025, Crutchfield posted a series of Polaroid photos of herself, Allison Crutchfield, MJ Lenderman and Brad Cook together. Allison, Lenderman and Cook all shared these photos on their own Instagram accounts as well. On October 31, 2025, this tease was revealed to be a surprise new studio album for the Crutchfield sisters and Lenderman. The album was released on Anti- under the project name of Snocaps, and was self-titled. Cook produced the album, with the sisters sharing lead vocals and Lenderman playing multiple instruments.

Waxahatchee performing at the yearly benefit show for KC Tenants in 2026.

On January 20, 2026, Waxahatchee featured on the Courtney Barnett single "Site Unseen", contributing vocals. In the press release, Barnett said that she is "a big Waxahatchee fan" and added "I really love Katie's songwriting and her voice".

== Personal life ==
Crutchfield’s twin sister Allison is also a musician, performing solo and with the band Swearin'. Crutchfield is sober; her 2020 album Saint Cloud was largely written about her decision to stop drinking alcohol.

Crutchfield has been in a relationship with songwriter Kevin Morby since 2017, and they live together in Overland Park, Kansas. In 2017 the couple released a cover of "After Hours" by the Velvet Underground. In January 2018, indie label Dead Oceans released the single "Farewell Transmission" with "The Dark Don't Hide It" by Morby & Waxahatchee as the b-side, in homage to songwriter Jason Molina. Merge Records published the digital single video Chapel of Pines, on YouTube on July 17, 2018, which led Waxahatchee back to solo work. Waxahatchee's cover of Kevin Morby's "Downtown's Lights" was featured over the closing credits of episode six of American Rust.

On April 13, 2026, during her concert with MJ Lenderman at the Atlanta Symphony Hall, Crutchfield announced that she and Morby were expecting their first child. The baby, a son, was born in July 2026.

== Discography ==
=== Studio albums ===
==== as Waxahatchee ====
List of albums, with selected chart positions
Title	Album details	Peak chart positions									
Title	Album details	US	US Indie	BEL (FL)	FRA Phys.	NED Vinyl	NZ	SCO	SPA Vinyl	SWE Phys.	UK
American Weekend	Released: January 12, 2012; Label: Don Giovanni	—	—	—	—	—	—	—	—	—	—
Cerulean Salt	Released: March 5, 2013; Label: Don Giovanni	— (Note: Cerulean Salt did not enter the US Billboard 200, but peaked at number 26 on the Top Heatseekers Albums Chart.)	—	—	—	—	—	—	—	—	156
Ivy Tripp	Released: April 7, 2015; Label: Merge, Wichita	153	15	—	—	—	—	87	—	—	98
Out in the Storm	Released: July 14, 2017; Label: Merge	— (Note: Out in the Storm did not enter the US Billboard 200, but peaked at number three on the Top Heatseekers Albums Chart and number 52 on the Top Album Sales chart.)	7	—	—	—	—	—	—	—	— (Note: Out in the Storm did not enter the UK Albums Chart, but peaked at number 89 on the UK Official Album Sales Chart.)
Saint Cloud	Released: March 27, 2020; Label: Merge	140	17	—	—	—	—	27	—	—	— (Note: Saint Cloud did not enter the UK Albums Chart, but peaked at number 19 on the UK Official Album Downloads Chart.)
Tigers Blood	Released: March 22, 2024; Label: Anti-	146	27	101	172	31	35	7	48	7	38
"—" denotes a recording that did not chart or was not released in that territory.

==== with Plains ====
List of albums, with selected chart positions
Title	Album details	Peak chart positions			
Title	Album details	SCO	UK Sales	UK Amer.	UK Indie
I Walked with You a Ways	Released: October 14, 2022; Label: Anti-	76	61	4	25
"—" denotes a recording that did not chart or was not released in that territory.

==== with Snocaps ====
List of albums
Title	Album details
Snocaps	Released: October 31, 2025; Label: Anti-

=== EPs ===
List of EPs, with selected chart positions
Title	EP details	Peak chart positions		
Title	EP details	US Current	US Indie	US Heat
Great Thunder	Released: September 7, 2018; Label: Merge	84	26	6
El Deafo (Apple TV+ Original Series Soundtrack)	Released: January 7, 2022; Label: Apple Video Programming/Merge	–	–	–
"—" denotes a recording that did not chart or was not released in that territory.

=== Singles ===
as Waxahatchee

List of singles
Title	Year	Peak chart positions		Album
Title	Year	US AAA	UK Sales	Album
"Air"	2015	—	—	Ivy Tripp
"Under a Rock"	2015	—	—	Ivy Tripp
"La Loose"	2015	—	—	Ivy Tripp
"No Curse"	2017	—	—	Non-album single
"Silver"	2017	—	—	Out in the Storm
"Farewell Transmission" / "The Dark Don't Hide It" (with Kevin Morby)	2018	—	—	Non-album singles
"Recite Remorse"	2018	—	—	Out in the Storm
"Greenville" (live) / "La Loose" (live)	2018	—	—	Live At Third Man
"Fire"	2020	—	—	Saint Cloud
"Lilacs"	2020	26	—	Saint Cloud
"Can't Do Much"	2020	—	—	Saint Cloud
"Talking Dust Bowl Blues"	2021	—	—	Non-album single
"Right Back to It" (featuring MJ Lenderman)	2024	17	—	Tigers Blood
"Bored"	2024	12	—	Tigers Blood
"Much Ado About Nothing"	2024	27	46	Tigers Blood
"Mud"	2025	—	—	Non-album single
"—" denotes a recording that did not chart or was not released in that territory.

with Plains

List of singles
Title	Year	Peak chart positions	Album
Title	Year	US AAA	Album
"Problem With It"	2022	35	I Walked with You a Ways
"Abilene"	2022	—	I Walked with You a Ways
"Hurricane"	2022	36	I Walked with You a Ways
"—" denotes a recording that did not chart or was not released in that territory.

as featured artist

- "Thirteen" (with Bedouine and Hurray for the Riff Raff) (2020, Spacebomb)
- "Other Side" (with Wynonna) (2022, Anti-)

== Awards and nominations ==
Year	Association	Category	Nominated work	Result	Ref
2021	Libera Awards	Record of the Year	Saint Cloud	Nominated	
2021	Libera Awards	Best Country Record	Saint Cloud	Won	
2025	Grammy Awards	Best Americana Album	Tiger's Blood	Nominated	
