= Mike Krol =

American musician

Michael Frederick Krol
- Born: May 19, 1984 (age 42); Wauwatosa, Wisconsin, United States
- Genres: Garage rock, power pop
- Instruments: Vocals, guitar, drums
- Years active: 2011–present
- Labels: Merge Records; Counter Counter Culture
- Website: http://www.mikekrol.com/

Michael Frederick Krol (born May 19, 1984) is an American musician and graphic designer based in Los Angeles, California. After releasing two albums on Counter Counter Culture, Krol released his third album Turkey on Merge Records August 28, 2015. Power Chords was released in 2019, described by Dagger as "hit[ting] a nerve here with some real classic catchy, garage rock."

In 2020, Mike Krol married Allison Crutchfield, an artist in multiple independent projects among some with her sister Katie Crutchfield, creator of the folk-rock group Waxahatchee. Allison plays bass in Mike Krol's band on occasion, and she is a featured vocalist on tracks such as "I Wonder."

== Discography ==
Studio albums

- I Hate Jazz (Counter Counter Culture, 2011)
- Trust Fund (Counter Counter Culture, 2013)
- Turkey (Merge Records, 2015)
- Power Chords (Merge Records, 2019)

Singles/EPs

- Live at Vera (Roekie Records, 2016)
- An Ambulance B/W Never Know (Merge Records, 2018)

Compilations

- Mike Krol Is Never Dead: The First Two Records (Merge Records, 2017)
- Dog Songs (2017), "Beethoven (Beethoven)"
- You Wish: A Merge Records Holiday Album (Merge Records, 2019), "Won't Be Alone Tonight"

Mac Krol

- "For Some Other Reason" b/w "Fair Warning" & "What Would You Say?" (Single) (Merge Records, 2023)

== Other media ==
Merge Records announced that Krol's music would be making an appearance on Cartoon Network's Steven Universe. His name, image, and songs "Like a Star" and "Fifteen Minutes" were prominently featured on the sixth episode of the fourth season, "Last One Out of Beach City". In 2019 he co-wrote and produced the song "Disobedient" for the soundtrack of Steven Universe: The Movie.

Krol wrote and recorded a song for the Cartoon Network short Jammers.

Krol recorded the song "The World's Gonna End" for an online video by entertainment company Super Deluxe.

The song "Fifteen Minutes" is also used as the credits song to the dating sim Monster Prom, where it's only heard when playing the non-dlc game mode.

The song "La La La" was used in a television advertisement for Levi's.

Mike has also grown a modest following for his music online, with most notable additions being his subreddit r/mikekrol and the fan Discord Server which, in May 2021, released a fan-made cover of I Hate Jazz called "We Hate Jazz".
