= Snocaps =

American indie rock band

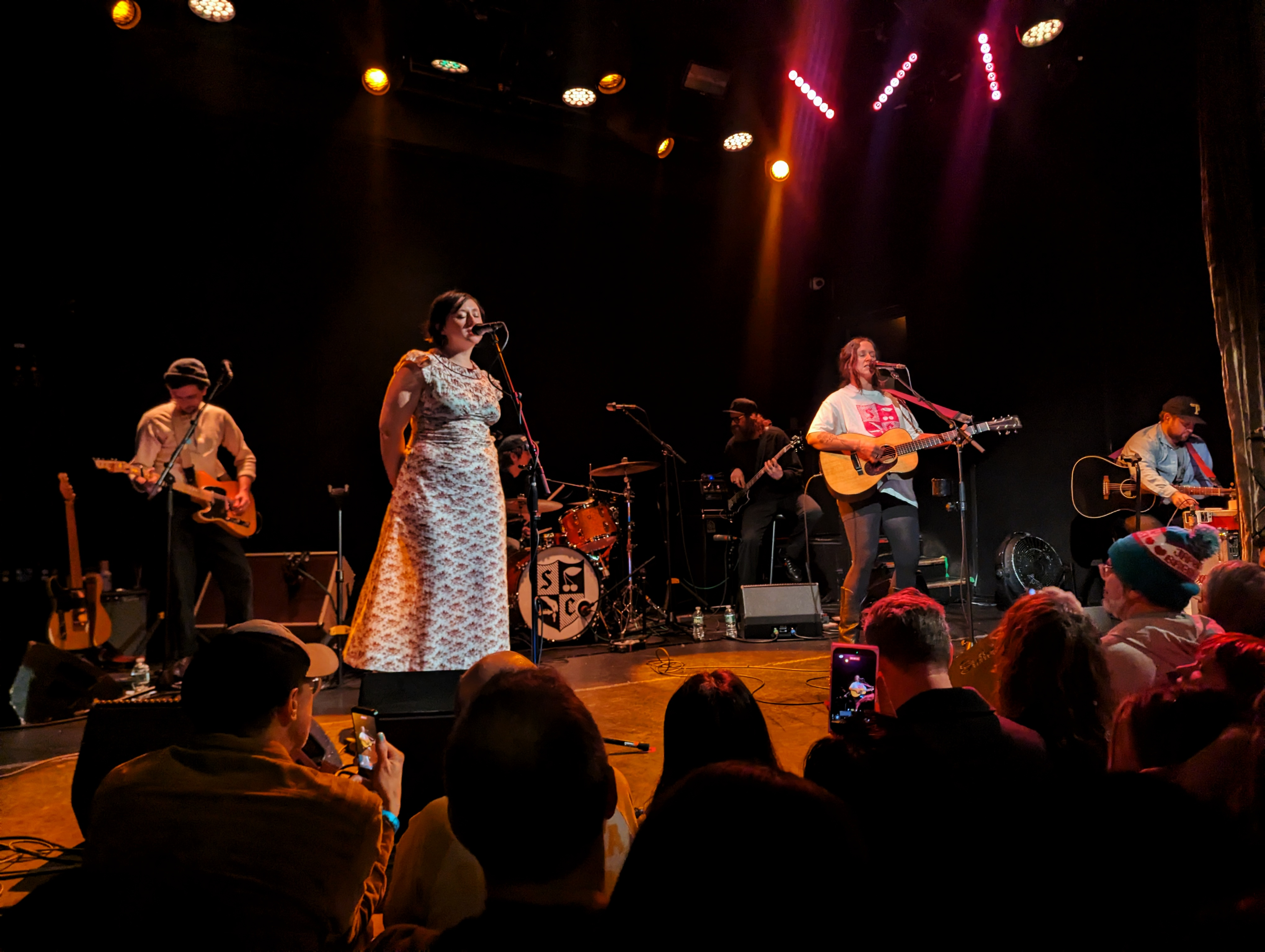
- Snocaps at Bowery Ballroom, December 7th 2025

Background information
- Years active: 2025–present
- Label: Anti-
- Spinoff of: Waxahatchee, Swearin'
- Members: Katie Crutchfield; Allison Crutchfield; MJ Lenderman; Brad Cook

Snocaps is an American indie rock supergroup consisting of Katie Crutchfield, better known as Waxahatchee, her sister Allison Crutchfield, MJ Lenderman and Brad Cook. The group surprise released their debut album on October 31, 2025, via Anti-. The album is the sisters' first music together since releasing music as P.S. Eliot.

== Discography ==
Studio albums

- Snocaps (2025, Anti-)

Singles

Year	Song	Peak chart positions		Album
Year	Song	US AAA	US Air	Album
2025	"Heathcliff"	3	34	Snocaps

== Reception ==
Katie Hawthorne, in a review for The Guardian, gave their self-titled debut album 4 out of 5 stars, praising it as "headstrong, tender Americana about chasing integrity and conviction." In a review for Pitchfork, Marissa Lorusso wrote positively of the Crutchfield sisters' songwriting and suggested that "their candor sounds hard-earned and their uncertainty feels honest". Lorusso wrote that "since their last album-length collaboration" the Crutchfield sisters have "triumphed over personal difficulties" and that "there’s something therapeutic, then, about hearing them return to each other on a record that sounds genuinely fun". Matt Mitchell, reviewing for Paste Magazine, described the album as "a hailstorm of warm, exceptionally-written country-rock bangers" and scored it 8.5/10, writing that "it’s a gift that Snocaps exists" and concluding that "Katie and Allison have brought us a world of good-sounding miracles". Will Hermes, of Rolling Stone, gave the album 4/5 stars and described it as a "fantastic surprise album".
