= Thundercat discography =

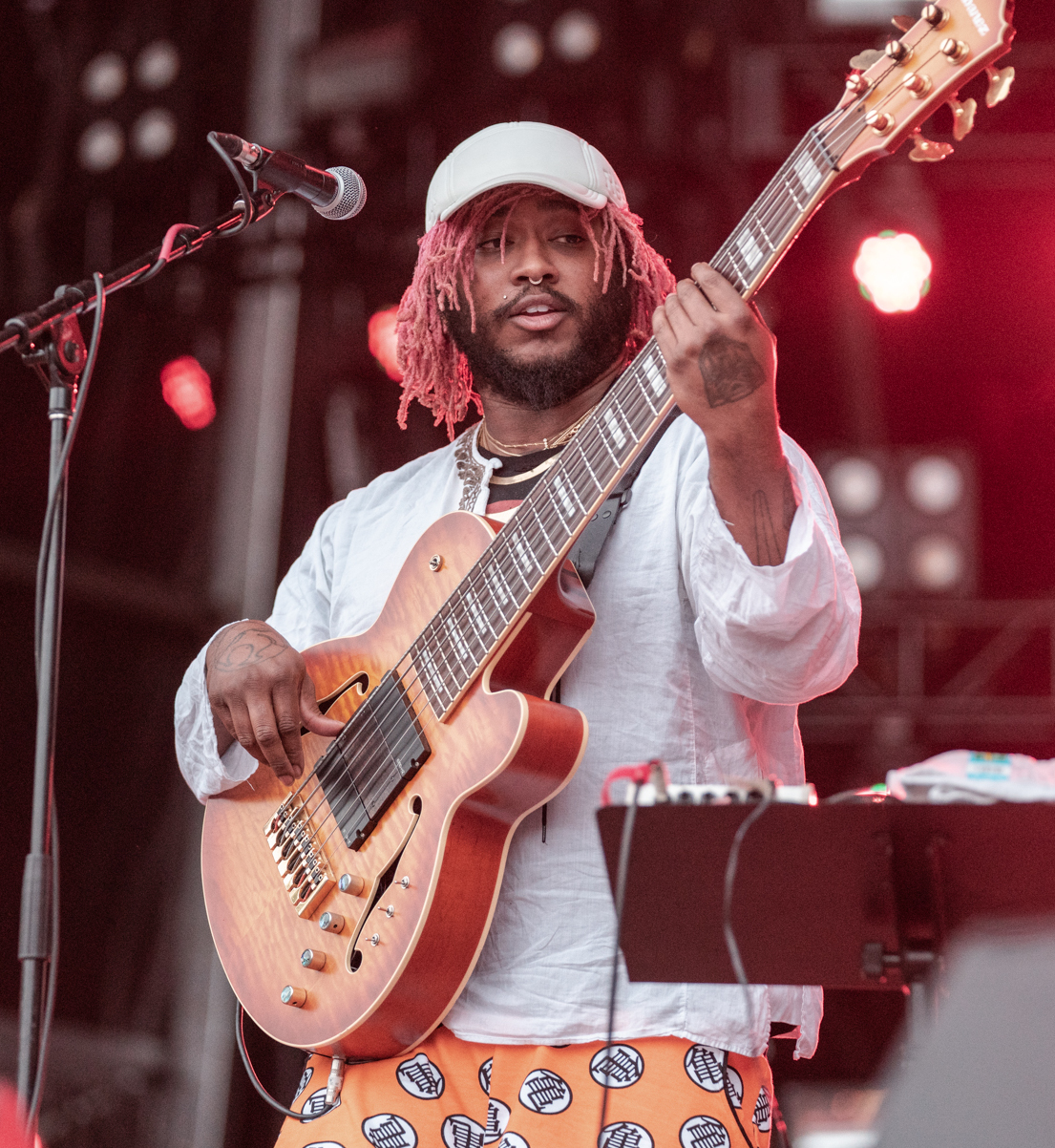
- Thundercat performing in 2018
- Studio albums: 5
- EPs: 1
- Singles: 12

The discography of American musician Thundercat includes five studio albums, an extended play, and twelve singles (including three as a featured artist).

== Albums ==
List of studio albums, with selected chart positions
| Title | Album details | Peak chart positions | | | | | | | | | |
| Title | Album details | US | AUS | BEL | CAN | GER | IRL | NL | NZ | SWI | UK |
|---|---|---|---|---|---|---|---|---|---|---|---|
| The Golden Age of Apocalypse | Released: August 29, 2011; Label: Brainfeeder; Formats: CD, LP, digital download | — (Note: The Golden Age of Apocalypse did not enter the US Billboard 200, but peaked at number 18 on the US Heatseekers Albums Chart.) | — | — | — | — | — | — | — | — | — |
| Apocalypse | Released: July 9, 2013; Label: Brainfeeder; Formats: CD, LP, digital download | 194 | — | — | — | — | — | — | — | — | — |
| Drunk | Released: February 24, 2017; Label: Brainfeeder; Formats: CD, LP, digital download | 50 | 58 | 39 | 78 | 63 | — | 35 | — | 56 | 37 |
| It Is What It Is | Released: April 3, 2020; Label: Brainfeeder; Formats: CD, LP, digital download | 38 | 50 | 28 | 87 | 30 | 95 | 66 | 36 | 56 | 23 |
| Distracted | Released: April 3, 2026; Label: Brainfeeder; Formats: CD, LP, digital download | 116 | 28 | 114 | — | 54 | — | 51 | 28 | 68 | 76 |
"—" denotes a title that did not chart, or was not released in that territory.

== Extended plays ==
List of studio albums, with selected chart positions
| Title | Album details | Peak chart positions | | |
| Title | Album details | US Heat | US R&B/ HH | BEL |
|---|---|---|---|---|
| The Beyond / Where the Giants Roam | Released: June 22, 2015; Label: Brainfeeder; Formats: LP, digital download | 9 | 21 | 185 |

== Singles ==
=== As lead artist ===
List of singles as lead artist, with showing year released and album name
| Title | Year | Peak chart positions | | | | | | | | | | Certifications | Album |
| Title | Year | US | US R&B/ HH | CAN | JPN Over. | MEX Eng. | NZ Hot | POR | UK Sales | UK R&B | WW | Certifications | Album |
|---|---|---|---|---|---|---|---|---|---|---|---|---|---|
| "Heartbreaks + Setbacks" | 2013 | — | — | — | — | — | — | — | — | — | — | | Apocalypse |
| "Oh Sheit It's X" | 2013 | — | — | — | — | — | — | — | — | — | — | | Apocalypse |
| "Them Changes" | 2015 | — | — | — | — | — | — | — | — | — | — | RIAA: Platinum; BPI: Gold | The Beyond / Where the Giants Roam and Drunk |
| "Bus in These Streets" | 2016 | — | — | — | — | — | — | — | — | — | — | | The Beyond / Where the Giants Roam and Drunk |
| "Show You the Way" (featuring Kenny Loggins and Michael McDonald) | 2017 | — | — | — | — | — | — | — | — | — | — | | The Beyond / Where the Giants Roam and Drunk |
| "Friend Zone" | 2017 | — | — | — | — | 42 | — | — | — | — | — | | The Beyond / Where the Giants Roam and Drunk |
| "King of the Hill" (featuring Flying Lotus and BadBadNotGood) | 2018 | — | — | — | — | — | — | — | — | — | — | | Brainfeeder X and It Is What It Is |
| "Black Qualls" (featuring Steve Lacy and Steve Arrington) | 2020 | — | — | — | — | — | — | — | — | — | — | | Brainfeeder X and It Is What It Is |
| "Dragonball Durag (Remix)" (featuring Smino and Guapdad 4000) | 2020 | — | — | — | — | — | — | — | — | — | — | RIAA: Gold | Brainfeeder X and It Is What It Is |
| "Fair Chance" (featuring Ty Dolla Sign and Lil B) | 2020 | — | — | — | — | — | — | — | — | — | — | | Brainfeeder X and It Is What It Is |
| "After Last Night" (with Silk Sonic and Bootsy Collins) | 2022 | 68 | 17 | 92 | — | — | 8 | 104 | 90 | 20 | 78 | RMNZ: Gold | An Evening with Silk Sonic |
| "No More Lies" (with Tame Impala) | 2023 | — | — | — | 7 | — | 23 | — | 91 | — | — | | Distracted |
| "I Wish I Didn't Waste Your Time" | 2025 | — | — | — | 15 | — | — | — | — | — | — | | Distracted |
| "Children of the Baked Potato" (with Remi Wolf) | 2025 | — | — | — | — | — | — | — | — | — | — | | Non-album singles |
| "Upside Down" | 2025 | — | — | — | 7 | — | — | — | — | — | — | | Non-album singles |
| "I Did This to Myself" (with Lil Yachty) | 2026 | — | — | — | 17 | — | — | — | — | — | — | | Distracted |
| "She Knows Too Much" (with Mac Miller) | 2026 | — | — | — | — | — | 20 | — | — | — | — | | Distracted |
| "Moving at Light Speed" (with Button Masher) | 2026 | — | — | — | 14 | — | — | — | — | — | — | | Non-album single |
"—" denotes a recording that did not chart, was not released in that territory, or was released recently.

=== As featured artist ===
List of singles, with selected chart positions, showing year released and album name
| Title | Year | Peak chart positions | | | | | | | | | | Certifications | Album |
| Title | Year | US | US R&B/ HH | US Rock | CAN Rock | IRL | MEX Eng. | NL Tip | NZ Hot | UK | UK R&B | Certifications | Album |
|---|---|---|---|---|---|---|---|---|---|---|---|---|---|
| "MmmHmm" (Flying Lotus featuring Thundercat) | 2010 | — | — | — | — | — | — | — | — | — | — | | Cosmogramma |
| "These Walls" (Kendrick Lamar featuring Thundercat, Bilal, and Anna Wise) | 2015 | 94 | 34 | — | — | — | — | 24 | — | 77 | 12 | MC: Gold | To Pimp a Butterfly |
| "Take the Time" (Ronald Bruner Jr. featuring Thundercat) | 2017 | — | — | — | — | — | — | — | — | — | — | | Triumph |
| "Cracker Island" (Gorillaz featuring Thundercat) | 2022 | — | — | 20 | 4 | 97 | 19 | — | 37 | 94 | — | | Cracker Island |
"—" denotes a recording that did not chart, was not released in that territory, or was released recently.

== Other charted songs ==
List of other charted songs, with selected chart positions, showing year released and album name
| Title | Year | Peak chart positions | | | | | | | | | Album | Certification |
| Title | Year | US | US Dance | US R&B/ HH | BEL Tip | IRL | NL Tip | SWE Heat | UK | UK R&B | Album | Certification |
|---|---|---|---|---|---|---|---|---|---|---|---|---|
| "Wesley's Theory" (Kendrick Lamar featuring George Clinton and Thundercat) | 2015 | 91 | — | 33 | — | 99 | 14 | 16 | 76 | 11 | To Pimp a Butterfly | |
| "Funny Thing" | 2020 | — | — | — | 44 | — | — | — | — | — | It Is What It Is | RIAA: Platinum |
| "Black Gold" (Flying Lotus featuring Thundercat) | 2021 | — | 18 | — | — (Note: "Black Gold" did not enter the Flanders Ultratop 50, but charted as an "extra tip" on the Flanders Ultratip chart.) | — | — | — | — | — | Yasuke | |
| "Be Careful" (Kaytranada featuring Thundercat) | 2021 | — | 20 | — | — | — | — | — | — | — | Intimidated | |
"—" denotes a recording that did not chart or was not released in that territory.

== Guest appearances ==
List of non-single guest appearances, with other performing artists, showing year released and album name
| Title | Year | Other artist(s) | Album |
|---|---|---|---|
| "Changes" | 2009 | Shafiq Husayn, Om'Mas Keith | Shafiq En' A-Free-Ka |
| "Drowning" | 2012 | Zack Sekoff | Ancestor's |
| "DMT Song" | 2012 | Flying Lotus | Until the Quiet Comes |
| "How Can I Be a Hero?" | 2013 | Dethklok | The Doomstar Requiem: A Klok Opera |
| "II. Shadows" | 2013 | Childish Gambino | Because the Internet |
| "Between Villains" | 2013 | Flying Lotus, Viktor Vaughn, Earl Sweatshirt, Captain Murphy | Ideas+Drafts+Loops |
| "Black Skinhead (Remix)" | 2013 | Flying Lotus | Ideas+Drafts+Loops |
| "In the Morning" | 2013 | Mac Miller, Syd tha Kyd | Live from Space |
| "Something Special" | 2014 | Wiz Khalifa | 28 Grams |
| "Already There" | 2014 | Taylor McFerrin, Robert Glasper | Early Riser |
| "Descent into Madness" | 2014 | Flying Lotus | You're Dead! |
| "Wesley's Theory" | 2015 | Kendrick Lamar, George Clinton | To Pimp a Butterfly |
| "These Walls" | 2015 | Kendrick Lamar, Bilal, Anna Wise | To Pimp a Butterfly |
| "Bloomingdale's" | 2015 | White Boiz, Anderson Paak, Jimetta Rose | Neighborhood Wonderful |
| "Dead Friends" | 2015 | Kirk Knight, Noname | Late Knight Special |
| "Debauchery" | 2016 | Zack Sekoff | Remnants of a Winter Sun |
| "Untitled 08 | 09.06.2014." | 2016 | Kendrick Lamar | Untitled Unmastered |
| "Curly Martin" | 2016 | Terrace Martin, Robert Glasper, Ronald Bruner Jr. | Velvet Portraits |
| "Lonely World (Lamentations Version)" | 2016 | Moses Sumney | Lamentations |
| "Take the Time" | 2017 | Ronald Bruner Jr. | Triumph |
| "What's the Use?" | 2018 | Mac Miller, Syd, Dâm-Funk, Snoop Dogg | Swimming |
| "Tunnels in the Air" | 2018 | Louis Cole | Time |
| "The Climb" | 2019 | Flying Lotus | Flamagra |
| "Track 6" | 2020 | Ty Dolla Sign, Kanye West, Anderson Paak | Featuring Ty Dolla Sign |
| "Right" | 2020 | Mac Miller | Circles |
| "3 AM" | 2021 | Haim | Women in Music Pt. III (Expanded edition) |
| "After Last Night" | 2021 | Silk Sonic | An Evening with Silk Sonic |
| "Be Careful" | 2021 | Kaytranada | Intimidated |
| "Black Gold" | 2021 | Flying Lotus | Yasuke |
| "Between Memories" | 2021 | Flying Lotus, Niki Randa | Yasuke |
| "Wondering/Wandering" | 2022 | Kehlani, Ambré | Blue Water Road |
| "Bowling" | 2022 | Domi and JD Beck | Not Tight |
| "Not Tight" | 2022 | Domi and JD Beck | Not Tight |
| "The End" | 2024 | Justice | Hyperdrama |

== Production discography ==
=== 2011 ===
Thundercat – The Golden Age of Apocalypse

- 02. "Daylight" (produced with Taylor Graves and Flying Lotus)
- 03. "Fleer Ultra" (produced with Taylor Graves)
- 04. "Is It Love?" (produced with Flying Lotus)
- 05. "For Love I Come" (produced with Flying Lotus)
- 06. "It Really Doesn't Matter to You" (produced with Hadrien Féraud and Flying Lotus)
- 07. "Jamboree" (produced with Ronald Bruner Jr., Brook D’Leau, and Flying Lotus)
- 08. "Boat Cruise" (produced with Shafiq Husayn and Flying Lotus)
- 09. "Seasons" (produced with Shafiq Husayn)
- 10. "Goldenboy" (produced with Chris Dave)
- 11. "Walkin" (produced with Hadrien Féraud and Flying Lotus)
- 12. "Mystery Machine (The Golden Age Of Apocalypse)" (produced with Flying Lotus)
- 13. "Return to the Journey" (produced with Flying Lotus)

=== 2012 ===
JoJo – Agápē

- 01. "Back2thebeginningagain" (produced with State of Emergency)

=== 2013 ===
The Internet – Feel Good

- 06. "Red Balloon"

Childish Gambino – Because the Internet

- 06. "II. Shadows" (produced with Childish Gambino and Ludwig Göransson)

Mac Miller – Live from Space

- 14. "In the Morning" (produced with The Internet)

=== 2014 ===
Mac Miller - Faces

- 01. "Inside Outside"
- 15. "55" (produced with Mac Miller and Dylan Reynolds)
- 17. "Colors and Shapes" (produced with Mac Miller)

Issa Gold - Conversations with a Butterfly

- 07. "Lions Can Fly"

SZA

- "Sobriety" (produced with Chris Calor, Cody, LoveDragon, Sounwave and Ifan Dafydd)

=== 2015 ===
Kendrick Lamar - To Pimp a Butterfly

- 01. "Wesley's Theory" (produced with Flying Lotus, Flippa, and Sounwave)
- 10. "Hood Politics" (produced with Tae Beast and Sounwave)
- 12. "Complexion (A Zulu Love)" (produced with Sounwave, Terrace Martin, and The Antydote)

Thundercat - The Beyond / Where the Giants Roam

- 01. "Hard Times"
- 02. "Song for the Dead" (produced with Mono/Poly)
- 03. "Them Changes" (produced with Flying Lotus)
- 04. "Lone Wolf and Cub" (produced with Mono/Poly and Flying Lotus)
- 05. "That Moment" (produced with Flying Lotus)
- 06. "Where the Giants Roam/Field of the Nephilim"

Kirk Knight - Late Knight Special

- 10. "Dead Friends" (produced with Kirk Knight)

=== 2016 ===
Kendrick Lamar - Untitled Unmastered

- 02. "Untitled 02 | 06.23.2014." (produced with Cardo and Yung Exclusive)
- 04. "Untitled 04 | 08.14.2014." (produced with Sounwave and Kendrick Lamar)
- 08. "Untitled 08 | 09.06.2014." (produced with Mono/Poly)

=== 2017 ===
Thundercat - Drunk

- 01. "Rabbot Ho" (produced with Flying Lotus)
- 02. "Captain Stupido" (produced with Flying Lotus)
- 03. "Uh Uh" (produced with Flying Lotus)
- 04. "Bus in These Streets" (produced with Flying Lotus)
- 07. "Jethro" (produced with Flying Lotus)
- 08. "Day & Night" (produced with Flying Lotus)
- 09. "Show You the Way" (produced with Flying Lotus)
- 10. "Walk on By" (produced with Flying Lotus)
- 12. "Tokyo"
- 13. "Jameel's Space Ride" (produced with Flying Lotus)
- 15. "Them Changes" (produced with Flying Lotus)
- 16. "Where I'm Going" (produced with Flying Lotus)
- 17. "Drink Dat"
- 18. "Inferno" (produced with Flying Lotus)
- 19. "I Am Crazy" (produced with Flying Lotus)
- 20. "3AM" (produced with Flying Lotus)
- 21. "Drunk" (produced with Flying Lotus)
- 22. "The Turn Down" (produced with Flying Lotus)
- 23. "DUI" (produced with Flying Lotus)
- 24. "Hi"

=== 2018 ===
Kali Uchis - Isolation

- 01. "Body Language" (produced with Om'Mas Keith)

Travis Scott - Astroworld

- 11. "Astrothunder" (produced with Travis Scott, Frank Dukes, John Mayer, BadBadNotGood, River Tiber, and Vegyn)

Joji - Ballads 1

- 05. "Can't Get Over You" (produced with Clams Casino and Rogét Chahayed)

=== 2019 ===
Danny Brown - U Know What I'm Sayin?

- 09. "Negro Spiritual" (produced with Flying Lotus)

Buddy - Harlan & Alondra (Deluxe)

- 15. "Link Up" (produced with Flying Lotus)

=== 2021 ===
H.E.R. – Back of My Mind

- 06. "Bloody Waters" (produced with Kaytranada and Jeff "Gitty" Gitelman)

=== 2022 ===
Denzel Curry - Melt My Eyez See Your Future

- 11. "The Smell of Death"

=== 2025 ===
Mac Miller – Balloonerism

- 04. "5 Dollar Pony Rides" (produced with Mac Miller, Jameel Bruner and Ronald Bruner Jr.)
- 05. "Friendly Hallucinations" (produced with Taylor Graves)
- 06. "Mrs. Deborah Downer" (produced with Mac Miller and Taylor Graves)
- 09. "Funny Papers" (produced with Mac Miller and Taylor Graves)
- 11. "Transformations" (produced with Mac Miller and Jameel Bruner)
- 13. "Rick's Piano" (produced with Mac Miller and Dylan Reynolds)

== Other appearances ==
| Year | Artist | Release | Additional information |
|---|---|---|---|
| 2005 | Kamasi Washington and The Next Step | Live at 5th Street Dick's | Electric bass |
| 2007 | Kamasi Washington | The Proclamation | Electric bass |
| 2008 | Erykah Badu | New Amerykah Part One (4th World War) | Bass on "Me", "The Cell", "Master Teacher", "That Hump" |
| 2010 | Erykah Badu | New Amerykah Part Two (Return of the Ankh) | Bass on "Window Seat", bass and handclaps on "Turn Me Away (Get MuNNY)", bass on "Umm Hmm" |
| 2010 | Flying Lotus | Cosmogramma | Bass on "Pickled!", "Intro//A Cosmic Drama", "Zodiac Shit", "...And the World Laughs with You", "MmmHmm", "Satelllliiiiiiiteee", "Dance of the Pseudo Nymph", "Galaxy in Janaki" |
| 2010 | Bilal | Airtight's Revenge | Electric bass on "Levels", "Think It Over" |
| 2010 | Suicidal Tendencies | No Mercy Fool!/The Suicidal Family | Bass |
| 2010 | Flying Lotus | Pattern+Grid World | Bass |
| 2011 | Snoop Dogg | Doggumentary | Electric bass on "Toyz N Da Hood" |
| 2012 | Flying Lotus | Until the Quiet Comes | Bass, composer, vocals |
| 2013 | Suicidal Tendencies | 13 | Bass |
| 2013 | Childish Gambino | Because the Internet | Bass on "I. Pink Toes" |
| 2014 | Schoolboy Q | Oxymoron | Bass on "Hoover Street" |
| 2014 | Mac Miller | Faces | Bass on "Ave Maria" and "New Faces v2" |
| 2014 | Kimbra | The Golden Echo | Writer on "Miracle" and "Madhouse" |
| 2014 | Jhené Aiko | Souled Out | Bass |
| 2014 | Flying Lotus | You're Dead! | Bass on "Theme", "Tesla", "Cold Dead", "Fkn Dead", "Never Catch Me", "Dead Man's Tetris", "Turkey Dog Coma", "Stirring", "Coronus, the Terminator", "Siren Song", "Turtles", "Ready err Not", "Eyes Above", "Descent into Madness", "The Boys Who Died in Their Sleep", "Obligatory Cadence", "Your Potential // The Beyond", "The Protest", guitar on "Fkn Dead" |
| 2015 | Kendrick Lamar | To Pimp a Butterfly | Bass on "King Kunta", "These Walls", "The Blacker the Berry", "i", "Mortal Man" |
| 2015 | Kamasi Washington | The Epic | Electric bass |
| 2015 | Mac Miller | GO:OD AM | Bass on "Brand Name" and "Break the Law" |
| 2015 | Ty Dolla Sign | Free TC | Writer on "Finale" |
| 2016 | Kendrick Lamar | Untitled Unmastered | 06.23.2014.", "Untitled 05 | 09.21.2014.", "Untitled 07 | 2014 – 2016" |
| 2016 | Mac Miller | The Divine Feminine | Additional vocals on "We" |
| 2017 | Kendrick Lamar | Damn | Bass on "Feel" |
| 2017 | Kamasi Washington | Harmony of Difference | Electric bass |
| 2017 | N.E.R.D. | No One Ever Really Dies | Bass on "Deep Down Body Thurst", "Voilà" |
| 2018 | Janelle Monáe | Dirty Computer | Bass on "Take a Byte" |
| 2018 | Kali Uchis | Isolation | Bass, guitar, drums on "Body Language" |
| 2018 | Kamasi Washington | Heaven and Earth | Electric bass |
| 2018 | Mac Miller | Swimming | Bass and additional vocals on "What's the Use?" |
| 2019 | Little Simz | Grey Area | Writer on "Venom" |
| 2019 | Flying Lotus | Flamagra | Bass |
| 2020 | Mac Miller | Circles | Bass on "Right" and "Floating" |
| 2021 | Silk Sonic | An Evening with Silk Sonic | Bass on "After Last Night" |
| 2022 | Kendrick Lamar | Mr. Morale & the Big Steppers | Bass on "Die Hard" and "Mother I Sober" |
| 2022 | JID | The Forever Story | Bass on "Lauder Too" |
| 2022 | Metro Boomin | Heroes & Villains | Bass on "Feel The Fiyaaaah" |
| 2024 | Tyler, the Creator | Chromakopia | Bass on "Noid", "I Killed You", "Judge Judy", "Take Your Mask Off", "Like Him", and "Mother" |
| 2025 | Mac Miller | Balloonerism | Bass on "DJ's Chord Organ", "5 Dollar Pony Rides", "Friendly Hallucinations", "Mrs. Deborah Downer", "Funny Papers", "Transformations", "Rick's Piano" and "Tomorrow Will Never Know"; additional vocals on "DJ's Chord Organ" |
