= Flying Lotus production discography =

Discography of hip-hop record producer

The following is a discography of production by hip-hop record producer Flying Lotus.

== 2008 ==
=== José James ===
- "Visions of Violet"

== 2009 ==
=== Declaime and Flying Lotus ===
- "Whole Wide World"
- "Lit Up"
- "Keep It Moving"

=== The Grouch and Eligh – Say G&E! ===
- 04. "Old Souls" (featuring Blu)

=== Oddisee – Oddisee 101 ===
- 07. "The Perch" (featuring Phonte and Tor)

== 2010 ==
=== MosEL - Just Thinking Out Loud ===
- 00. "Vent" (produced with Just Blaze)

=== Gonjasufi – A Sufi and a Killer ===
- 03. "Ancestors"

=== Williams Street Records – Adult Swim Singles Program 2010 ===
- "Swimming" (performed with Mike Bigga)

== 2012 ==
=== Hodgy Beats – Untitled ===
- 03. "Lately"
- 07. "Lamented"

=== Chance the Rapper – 10 Day ===
- 07. "22 Offs" (produced with Chance the Rapper)

=== Captain Murphy – Duality ===
- 03. "Mighty Morphin' Foreskin"
- 05. "Between Friends" (featuring Earl Sweatshirt)
- 06. "Children of the Atom" (produced with Madlib)
- 09. "The Killing Joke"
- 10. "Hovercrafts and Cows"
- 11. "Gone Fishing" (featuring Jeremiah Jae)
- 13. "Immaculation" (featuring Azizi Gibson and Jeremiah Jae)

== 2013 ==
=== Blu – York ===
- 01. "Doin' Nothin'" (featuring U-God)
- 02. "Everything's OK" (featuring Jack Davey)
- 14. "Doin' Something" (featuring El Prez, Pac Div, U-N-I, J*Davey, Tiron and Ayomari)

=== Mac Miller – Watching Movies with the Sound Off ===
- 04. "S.D.S."

=== Thundercat – Apocalypse ===
- 01. "Tenfold"
- 02. "Heartbreaks + Setbacks" (produced with Mono/Poly)
- 03. "The Life Aquatic"
- 04. "Special Stage"
- 05. "Tron Song"
- 06. "Seven" (produced with Zack Sekoff)
- 07. "Oh Sheit It's X" (produced with Mono/Poly)
- 08. "Without You"
- 09. "Lotus and the Jondy"
- 10. "Evangelion"
- 11. "We'll Die"
- 12. "A Message for Austin/Praise the Lord/Enter the Void"

=== Jeremiah Jae – Bad Jokes ===
- 04. "Oatmeal Face"

== 2015 ==
=== Kendrick Lamar – To Pimp a Butterfly ===
- 01. "Wesley's Theory" (featuring George Clinton and Thundercat) (produced with Flippa, Sounwave and Thundercat)

=== Thundercat - The Beyond / Where the Giants Roam ===
- 03. "Them Changes" (produced with Thundercat)
- 04. "Lone Wolf and Pup" (produced with Mono/Poly and Thundercat)
- 05. "That Moment" (produced with Thundercat)

== 2017 ==
=== Thundercat - Drunk ===
- 02. "Captain Stupido"
- 07. "Jethro"
- 09. "Show You the Way" (featuring Michael McDonald & Kenny Loggins)
- 16. "Where I'm Going"
- 18. "Inferno"
- 20. "3AM"
- 21. "Drunk"

== 2018 ==
=== Mac Miller - Swimming ===
- 09. "Conversation Pt. 1" (produced with Cardo and Yung Exclusive)

== 2019 ==
=== Danny Brown – U Know What I'm Sayin? ===
- 09. "Negro Spiritual" (featuring JPEGMafia)
