= Sleeper hit =

Successful media that was initially unsuccessful

In the entertainment industry, a sleeper hit is a film, television series, music release, video game or other entertainment product that was initially unsuccessful on release, but eventually became a surprise success. A sleeper hit may have had little to no promotion or lack a successful launch, but gradually develops a fandom and spreads via word of mouth, media coverage, or unexpected internet virality. As Variety puts it, "A 'sleeper hit' can be defined as the kind of show that catches us by surprise—programs whose popularity grows over time and can ultimately outshine the preordained hits."

A sleeper hit often lacks star performers or high production values, but prevails, at times against its makers' expectations, on the strength of such qualities as narrative, approach, or novelty, as well as market accidents. Sleeper hit films benefit theater owners because the owners keep a larger percentage of the money from ticket sales.

== In film ==
Some sleeper hits in the film industry are strategically marketed for audiences subtly, such as with sneak previews a couple of weeks prior to release, without making them feel obliged to see a heavily promoted film. This alternative form of marketing strategy has been used in sleeper hits such as Sleepless in Seattle (1993), the Oscar winner Forrest Gump (1994), My Best Friend's Wedding (1997), There's Something About Mary (1998), The Blair Witch Project (1999), and The Sixth Sense (1999).

Screenings for these films are held in an area conducive to the film's demographic. In the case of Sleepless in Seattle, a romantic comedy, screenings were held at suburban shopping malls where romantic couples in their mid-20s to early 30s spent Saturday afternoons before seeing a new film. In theory, a successful screening leads to word-of-mouth marketing, as it compels viewers to discuss an interesting, low-key film with co-workers when they return to work after their weekend.

Easy Rider (1969), which was created on a budget of less than $400,000 (equivalent to $3,512,000 in 2025), became a sleeper hit by earning $50 million and garnering attention from younger audiences with its combination of drugs, violence, motorcycles, counter-culture stance, and rock music. It was also one of the successful films during the beginnings of the American New Wave of cinema.

The Rocky Horror Picture Show (1975) was considered a failure for the first 6 months of its release until it found popularity in midnight screenings afterwards.

A Christmas Story (1983) was initially a modest success with little promotion, but after Ted Turner purchased the MGM pre-May 1986 back-catalog a few years later and began rerunning the film on his cable networks every December, it became an iconic Christmas classic.

The 1979 Australian film Mad Max, which sprung from the Ozploitation movement and helped to popularize the post-apocalyptic dystopia genre, held the record for the biggest profit-to-cost ratio for several years until it was broken in 1999 by The Blair Witch Project, also a sleeper hit.

The independent film Halloween, which played over the course of fall 1978 through fall 1979 and relied almost completely on word-of-mouth as marketing, was also a sleeper hit, having a box office take of $70 million on a budget of only $325,000. Its success caused other slasher films to try the same approach, although few fared as well since horror films heavily rely on opening weekend box office and quickly fall from theaters. Other notable examples of horror sleeper-hits to follow in Halloween's wake include A Nightmare on Elm Street in 1984, Scream in 1996, The Blair Witch Project in 1999, Saw in 2004, and Paranormal Activity in 2007.

Hocus Pocus (1993) underperformed at the box office but eventually became a sleeper hit through television airings on the 13 Nights of Halloween block on what is now Freeform.

The Iron Giant (1999) was a box-office failure due to lack of marketing from distributor Warner Bros., who did not have faith in the film. However, it received universal acclaim and earned a cult following once it arrived on home video and television, and is now considered a modern animation classic and one of the greatest animated films ever made.

Napoleon Dynamite made back its $500,000 budget and became a phenomenon in 2004, grossing almost $45 million within a year of its release, and became the basis for a short-lived animated series featuring the film's entire cast.

The Peanut Butter Falcon (2019) also went on to become a sleeper hit, expanding the following weekend to 1,249 theaters and earning $3 million, as well as $1.1 million on Labor Day.

Puss in Boots: The Last Wish (2022) grossed $12.4 million in its opening weekend, and ultimately became a sleeper hit by March 2023.

Elemental (2023) originally opened below projections, earning $29.5 million in its opening weekend. However, positive word-of-mouth led the movie to become a sleeper hit by managing to make a drastic turnaround, with many news outlets noting Pixar Animation Studios' box office comeback upon the film crossing $400 million worldwide by early August 2023, which ultimately became Disney's biggest animated success during the COVID-19 pandemic. It also performed well internationally, particularly in South Korea, which became the film's third-largest market. This was attributed to director Peter Sohn's Korean-American background and the incorporation of elements that resonated with Korean audiences. Upon hearing this news, Sohn stated "I think my heart burst with joy." By August 20, 2023, Elemental had surpassed Spider-Man: Across the Spider-Verse's international box office total and in January 2024, the film received an Oscar nomination for Best Animated Feature. (Note: Attributed to multiple references.)

The romantic comedy Anyone but You (2023) also opened below projections. It was projected to gross around $7 million during its opening weekend, but opened to $6.3 million instead. However, the film experienced a gradual increase in weekend gross and stayed within the top five. The film led the box office from January 8, 2024, to January 11, which saw the debut of new films.

Laalo – Krishna Sada Sahaayate (2025), an Indian Gujarati devotional drama film, struggled upon the release but a strong word-of-mouth resulted in the uptick in the audience from the third week. The film went on to become the highest-grossing Gujarati film of all-time.

Dear You (2026), a Chinese movie, grossed more than 1.8 billion yuan (about 264 million U.S. dollars) at the domestic box office despite featuring unknown cast and a low budget of $14 million yuan (about 2.06 million U.S. dollars), being the highest grossing Teochewese film in history.

Niu Lai, a Chinese animated fiilm, earned ¥7,169 (US$1,111.47) from 236 people in the first nine days of its release, which initial box office sales struggled due to producing only a few thousand yuan and sudden notoriety for its low-quality animation. However, following mass social media mockery, it earned over ¥100,000 in presales, including ¥46,000 on 15 August. It became a sleeper hit, which earned millions of yuan at the box office in the following days. It has grossed ¥45.17 million (US$7,003,100.78) at the box office. It is among the top ten highest-grossing animated films in China in 2026

== In music ==
Don Howard's 1952 recording of "Oh Happy Day" was one of the earliest sleeper hits. Featuring only Howard's baritone vocals and his acoustic guitar played at an amateur level, it was initially released regionally and was never expected to become a hit. A massive groundswell of support from teenagers in Howard's home base of Cleveland, Ohio, led to the song rapidly rising in popularity, despite music industry scorn; cover versions (including one by Larry Hooper and the Lawrence Welk orchestra) were quickly rushed into production, and by 1953, there were no fewer than four hit recordings of the same song circulating, including Howard's original.

The Romantics' 1980 single "What I Like About You" was a minor hit upon its release, charting at number 49 on the Billboard Hot 100 in the United States, while not charting at all in the United Kingdom. It eventually became one of the most popular songs of the 1980s thanks to its use in various advertising campaigns.

The Waterboys 1985 single "The Whole of the Moon" charted initially in several countries on the lower end of charts including No. 26 in the UK. The song was re-released in 1991 to much acclaim peaking at No. 3 in the UK and No. 3 in Europe, and becoming certified platinum in the UK. The song became one of their most successful songs and well known.

The 1987 single "Welcome to the Jungle" by American rock band Guns N' Roses performed poorly in both the United States and the United Kingdom when first released in September of that year. As the band's popularity grew steadily in 1988, it became a sleeper hit in the US and reached the top 10 of the Billboard charts. It was then re-released in the UK, charting within the top 40 there.

The 1990 single "Somewhere Over the Rainbow/What a Wonderful World" by Israel Kamakawiwoʻole became a sleeper hit after being featured in numerous film and TV soundtracks throughout the 2000s and 2010s, the song eventually charted across Europe in 2010 and 2011, finishing 16th on Germany's decade-end charts for the 2010s.

Nirvana's second album Nevermind was released in September 1991 with low expectations, hoping to sell 500,000 copies. The album entered the Billboard 200 at number 144, but slowly climbed up the charts over the following months, entering the top 40 in November. The album was selling 300,000 copies a week by December, before in January 1992, replacing Michael Jackson's Dangerous at number 1 on the Billboard charts. The album went on to sell over 30 million copies worldwide, and has since become one of the world's best-selling albums of all time.

"Thank You" by Dido was first featured in the movie Sliding Doors in 1998 and released as a single in September 2000 but did not chart on the Billboard Hot 100 until Eminem sampled the track for his hit single "Stan", which helped propel "Thank You" and Dido's debut album No Angel, which was released in 1999, to mainstream success. The single debuted on the chart at No. 80 in January 2001, and eventually peaked at number three in April 2001. No Angel entered the Billboard 200 at No. 144, where it eventually reached its peak position of No. 4 on the chart.

Maroon 5's debut studio album, Songs About Jane, was originally released in June 2002 but did not enter the chart until 11 months later in May 2003, where it underperformed on the chart, debuting at just No. 170, and staying beneath the top 40 for 8 months. However, with their popular hit single, "This Love," released in 2004, and the equally popular follow-up, "She Will Be Loved," both peaking at No. 5, with the former spending 14 weeks in the top ten and 43 weeks on the chart, it gave new hype for the album at the beginning of 2004, being certified platinum in February, and finally making the top 10 a month later.

The R&B singer Raphael Saadiq's classic soul-inspired album The Way I See It was a sleeper hit. Overlooked upon its release in 2008, it ended up charting for 41 weeks on the US Billboard 200.

"Just Dance" and "Poker Face" by pop singer Lady Gaga were both released in 2008 but did not become popular hits until the following year in early 2009 in some countries, including the US and the UK, eventually becoming No. 1 hits in those countries. "Poker Face", in particular, went on to win the Grammy Award for Best Dance Recording and become the world's best-selling single of 2009 overall.

R&B singer Miguel's 2010 debut album All I Want Is You performed poorly at first, debuting at number 109 on the Billboard 200 with sales of 11,000 copies, while underpromoted by his record label. As its singles achieved radio airplay and Miguel toured in the record's promotion, All I Want Is You became a sleeper hit and reached 404,000 copies sold by 2012. As of November 2017, the album has been certified platinum in the US.

"Trap Queen" by Fetty Wap was released online in March 2014 and independently in April 2014 but did not gain any recognition until December 2014. It entered on the Billboard Hot 100 in May 2015 and ultimately went on to be a top ten hit, peaking at number two; the song spent 25 consecutive weeks in the top ten. Outside the United States, "Trap Queen" peaked within the top ten of the charts in Denmark and the United Kingdom. An accompanying music video for the song, directed by Nitt Da Gritt, was released on his YouTube page that features Wap and his girlfriend partying at their apartment. He first performed the song on television at the 2015 MTV Movie Awards with Fall Out Boy and would make later appearances at The Tonight Show Starring Jimmy Fallon, Jimmy Kimmel Live!, Wild 'n Out and the BET Awards 2015 to perform the song. The song received two nominations at the 58th Grammy Awards: Best Rap Song and Best Rap Performance.

"Truth Hurts" by Lizzo was released in September 2017, and did not chart until its appearance in the 2019 romantic comedy film Someone Great led to the single debuting at the number 50 position on the Billboard Hot 100. As the song became a sleeper hit on the chart, the music video—featuring the singer in a "wedding-gone-wild" concept—went viral. By September 2019, the single had reached number one on the chart, while picking up 93 million views. The single also benefited from its use in TikTok videos by users who lip-synced or referenced the lyric "I just took a DNA test, turns out, I'm 100 percent that bitch". During its chart run, Gary Trust, the senior director of charts at Billboard, noted the rarity of a song topping the Hot 100 almost two years after its release, but explained that, "in the digital era, it's much easier than ever before for music fans to be exposed to older songs that might've been overlooked the first time around." According to Paper magazine's Michael Love Michael, Lizzo's sleeper hit can also be explained by a more inclusive popular media since the song's original release: "Black women are more visible than ever on magazine covers; fashion is having broader conversations about size, racial, and ethnic diversity. Lizzo's presence in these spaces signals a future of greater inclusion."

In the 2020s, Lostwave grew in popularity, spearheaded by the search for "Subways of Your Mind" by Fex - known for many years as "The Most Mysterious Song on the Internet". This and other songs which went unheralded at the time of their original release saw a resultant increase in popularity.

=== COVID-19 pandemic and TikTok ===
The COVID-19 pandemic played a significant role in audiences' rediscovery of previously released media, including music, primarily through video sharing service TikTok and other social media platforms. Songs which were released up to several years prior but failed to make an immediate impression commercially have gained renewed popularity and chart success. In September 2023, Billboard introduced the TikTok Billboard Top 50 chart, which keeps track of songs from how many plays they get on TikTok. Examples of TikTok sleeper hits since 2020 include:

- "Pretty Little Baby" by Connie Francis (released in 1962, went viral in 2025 shortly before Francis's death)
- "Misty" (jazz-standard written by Erroll Garner) by Lesley Gore (released as a non-single from the 1963 album I'll Cry If I Want To)
- "Mayonaka no Door (Stay with Me)" by Miki Matsubara (released November 1979; went viral on TikTok in 2020 during the city pop revival)
- "Running Up That Hill" by Kate Bush (released 1985; also appeared in Stranger Things on Netflix)
- "Dead Man" by Self (released as a song from the 2000 album Gizmodgery)
- "Murder on the Dancefloor" by Sophie Ellis-Bextor (released December 2001; also featured in the 2023 film Saltburn)
- "Who Is She?" by I Monster (released as a non-single from the 2003 album Neveroddoreven)
- "505" by Arctic Monkeys (a non-single from the 2007 album Favourite Worst Nightmare)
- "Bloody Mary" by Lady Gaga (originally a non-single from the 2011 album Born This Way but released as a single 11 years later, after becoming popular on TikTok as a feature edit from Wednesday on Netflix)
- "Sweater Weather" by The Neighbourhood (released 2012)
- "Another Love" by Tom Odell was a hit even when it was released at least in Europe.https://www.theguardian.com/music/2013/mar/24/tom-odell-broken-hearts-songs
- "Jenny (I Wanna Ruin Our Friendship)" by Studio Killers (released 2013)
- "Freaks" by Surf Curse (released 2013)
- "Doubt" by Twenty One Pilots (originally a non-single from the 2015 album Blurryface but its demo version was released as a single in 2025 when it went viral on TikTok)
- "Space Song" by Beach House (released 2015)
- "Makeba" by Jain (released as the second single for her debut studio album Zanaka released in 2015)
- "Them Changes" by Thundercat (released in 2015 as a single for the album The Beyond / Where the Giants Roam, and later for the 2017 album Drunk)
- "Little Dark Age" by MGMT (released 2017)
- "Buttercup" by Jack Stauber (released 2017)
- "Beggin'" (The Four Seasons cover) by Måneskin (released December 2017; band also won Eurovision Song Contest 2021 representing Italy)
- "Arcade" by Duncan Laurence (released March 2019 as the winning Dutch entry for the Eurovision Song Contest 2019)
- "Mary on a Cross" by Ghost (released September 2019)
- "Middle of the Night" by Elley Duhé (released January 2020)
- "Snap" by Rosa Linn (released March 2022 as the Armenian entry for the Eurovision Song Contest 2022)
- "End of Beginning" by Djo (released September 2022)
- "Go Away" by Weezer (released July 2015)

== In video games ==
Pocket Monster Red and Green were released in 1996 in Japan, and later released as Pokémon Red and Blue in 1998. They followed several years of development and became sleeper hits. Believing it to be a one-time product, Nintendo initially shipped 200,000 copies, a relatively low amount. Most media ignored the games, but largely by word-of-mouth stemming from the hidden character Mew's introduction, their popularity gradually spread throughout Japan, selling a million units by the end of 1996. They eventually became the best-selling video games ever in Japan, with 7.8 million copies sold, and 45 million sold worldwide. After becoming a national sensation in Japan, the franchise was introduced to the United States in September 1998, going on to start a worldwide craze dubbed "Pokémania".

Portal was released in 2007 with little fanfare as part of the game compilation The Orange Box, but eventually became a "phenomenon".

SteamWorld Dig (2013) was released on the 3DS by little-known developer Image & Form. It became one of the first indie games mentioned in a Nintendo Direct, and ultimately sold over a million copies on all platforms. If the game had not succeeded, the studio would have been forced to close.

Among Us was released in June 2018 and received little mainstream attention at first, with the game only averaging at around 30 to 50 concurrent players. It received a sudden and significant jump in popularity in mid-2020 after being popularized by streamers on Twitch and YouTube. In November 2020, SuperData Research reported that the game had over half a billion users, proclaiming it to be "by far the most popular game ever in terms of monthly players."

Helldivers 2, the sequel to Helldivers by developer Arrowhead Game Studios, began to have server issues because it was not designed to have a player base exceeding 250,000; at the time, the player base reached over 450,000. Because of its unforeseen success, Helldivers 2 became one of the biggest sleeper hits of all time.

== See also ==
- Art film
- Blockbuster (entertainment)
- Cult following
- Hit song
- Fandom
- Sleeper (car)
- Sleeper agent

== Bibliography ==
- Berra, John (2008). Declarations of Independence: American Cinema and the Partiality of Independent Production. Intellect Books. p. 68. ISBN 978-1841501857.
- Ganeri, Anita; Bergan, Ronald (2006). Eyewitness Companions: Film. Penguin. ISBN 0756643465.
- Gimarc, George (2005). Punk Diary: The Ultimate Trainspotter's Guide To Underground Rock, 1970-1982. Hal Leonard Corporation. ISBN 0879308486.
