= Oh Sheit It's X =

2013 single by Thundercat

Single by Thundercat

from the album Apocalypse
- Released: May 7, 2013
- Genre: Funk; disco
- Length: 3:47
- Label: Brainfeeder
- Songwriters: Stephen Lee Bruner; Steven Ellison; Charles Dickerson; Durand Furbee
- Producers: Mono/Poly; Flying Lotus

Thundercat singles chronology
"Heartbreaks + Setbacks" (2013)	"Oh Sheit It's X" (2013)	"Them Changes" (2015)

"Oh Sheit It's X" is a song by the American singer-songwriter Thundercat. He co-wrote the song with the record producers Flying Lotus, Mono/Poly, and Durand Furbee for Thundercat's second studio album Apocalypse. Brainfeeder released it as a single on May 7, 2013. Musically, "Oh Sheit It's X" is a funk and disco song, whose lyrics describe the protagonist experiencing an altered state of consciousness after consuming MDMA—otherwise known as "ecstasy" or "X"—at a party.

"Oh Sheit It's X" was co-produced by Mono/Poly and Lotus, and Thundercat received vocal-production advice from Durand Bernarr, who provided guidance to his falsetto. Thundercat and Mono/Poly developed the song's backing track while experimenting with basslines over existing recordings. The song received critical acclaim by music critics upon its release, who highlighted it from Apocalypse, and praising its lyrics, bassline, and production. The song was included in the video game Grand Theft Auto V (2013), and Thundercat has performed the song live, including during the Black Cab Sessions in 2015 and with Damon Albarn in 2024.

== Background and composition ==
"Oh Sheit It's X"
A 18-second sample of "Oh Sheit It's X". Multiple critics commented on its composition, lyrics and production.

"Oh Sheit It's X" was written by Stephen "Thundercat" Bruner, Steven "Flying Lotus" Ellison, Charles "Mono/Poly" Dickerson, and Durand Furbee, with Mono/Poly and Lotus co-producing it. The song is based on "the true story of an MDMA-fueled New Year's party" Thundercat attended, describing it as "one of the most epic things that has ever happened ... Two and a half days of full-on shenanigans". In the song, he sings about feeling ecstatic while being in an altered state of consciousness caused by ecstasy—otherwise known as MDMA and "X". Scott Heins called "Oh Sheit It's X" a "hard-stepping party song" whose composition was based on "hard drums and double-layered bass parts".

Thundercat said that he and Mono/Poly conceived "Oh Sheit It's X" by searching through tracks and playing bass over them. Mono/Poly played the synthesizers and drums for the backing track, while Thundercat played the bass before recording any lyrics, but the resulting work was subsequently shelved. Thundercat later invited Furbee and Durand Bernarr to listen to his works, and for "Oh Sheit It's X" Bernarr assisted Thundercat with the song's vocals, including the addition of a falsetto. Lotus later helped "shape" the song to its final result. Although hesitant to include the lyric "Oh shit, I'm fucked up" in the song, Lotus encouraged Thundercat to keep it. He felt conflicted about his mother listening to the record, but with Lotus' reassurance, he was able to express himself more freely.

The song runs at a tempo of 123 beats per minute. Music critics described it as a funk, disco, disco-funk, electro-funk, and boogie funk act. Gabriel Szatan wrote for Beats Per Minute that the song starts with "a frazzled synth lead and sloppy kickdrums", followed by Thundercat's bass guitar playing, which he compared to that of Jaco Pastorius. Jeremy Larson of Consequence of Sound (COS) compared its production to the work of Bootsy Collins, while other critics described it as having a "warbly funk" and a "virtuoso slap" bass; spatial and "disco-inspired synth stabs", "weird disco strings", and a "four-on-the-floor beat". The bass chords were likened to a "bright bouncing ball" that "fizzle and pop [rapidly]". Vocally, Thundercat sings in falsetto, with critics describing his delivery as "suave", "soulful", "velvety and dance-drunk",, and "[innocent] in indulgence".

== Release and promotion ==
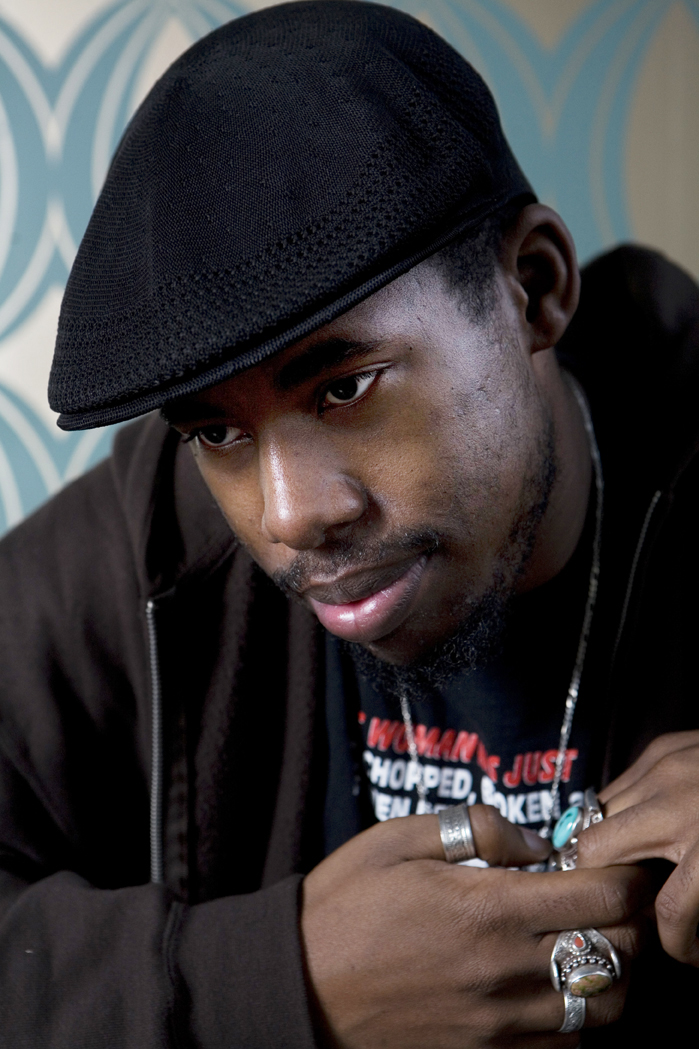
Lotus added "Oh Sheit It's X" to the track listing of his GTA V radio station.

"Oh Sheit It's X" was released as single on May 7, 2013. It was one of the 214 songs originally featured in the 2013 video game Grand Theft Auto V, and was included on the FlyLo FM radio station, hosted by Lotus.

Thundercat has performed live "Oh Sheit It's X" at multiple events. In 2015, he sang it at the Black Cab Sessions, whose performance was described by Scott Heins as a "tender [but goofy] ballad". Thundercat added it to the setlist supporting his 2017 album Drunk. Grimy Goods called the performance a "high energy dance number".

On April 5, 2024, Damon Albarn, frontman of Gorillaz, joined Thundercat onstage with a harmonica during the third night of his concert residency at Koko, and they performed "Oh Sheit It's X" along with "Funny Thing", "Them Changes", and "Cracker Island". During the 2025 Outside Lands music festival, Thundercat ended his performance with "Oh Sheit It's X" following the request of the audience.

== Critical reception ==
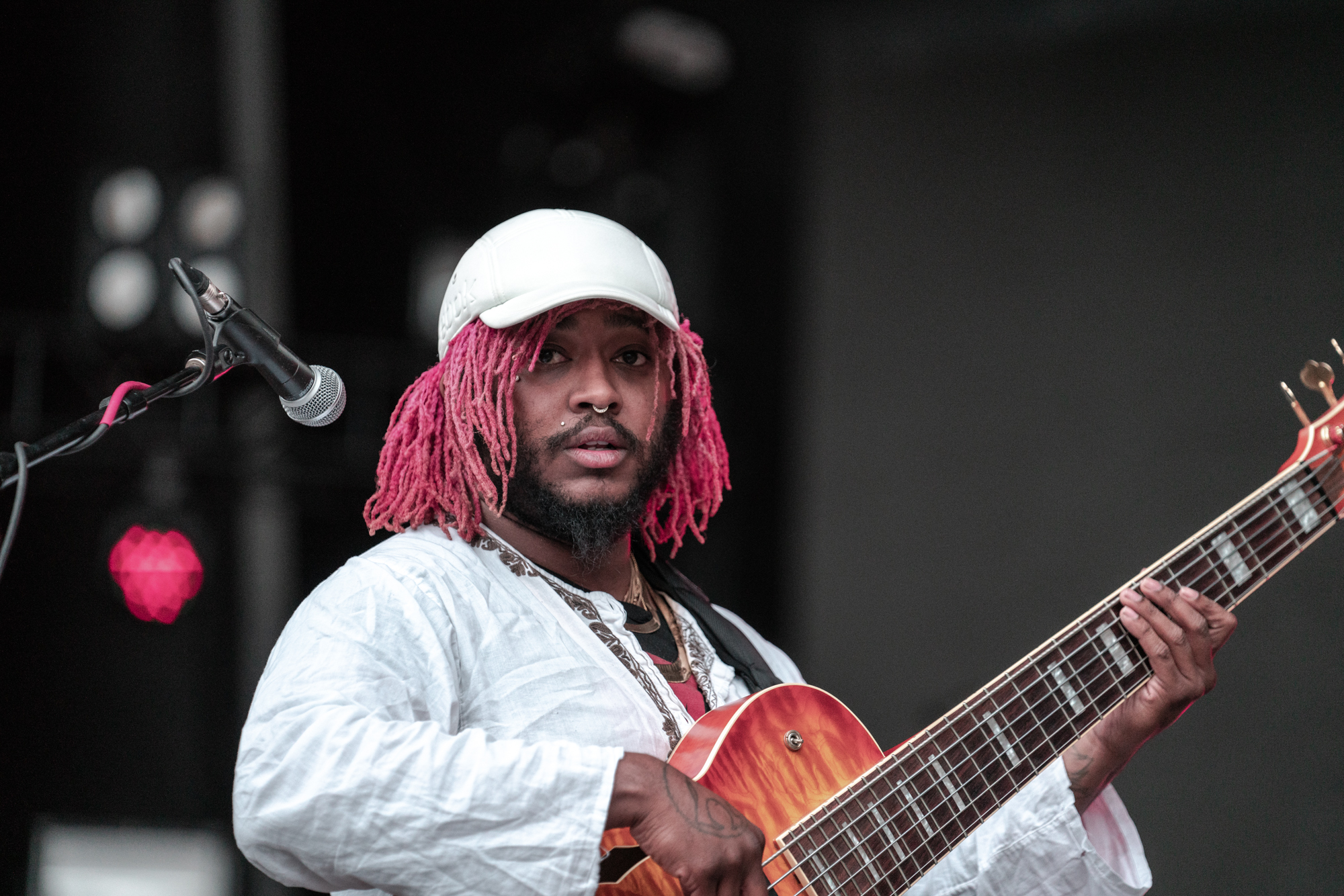
Thundercat's bassline and style were frequently mentioned by critics when they reviewed the song.

For Stereogum, Miles Bowe contrasted the energy present in "Oh Sheit It's X" with the previous single "Heartbreaks + Setbacks", describing the former as being "for the hips" while the second for the head. Larson from COS, compared the song to the works of Parliament-Funkadelic. Similarly, an editor from Fact did it with the Shamen's "Ebeneezer Goode" and mentioned that disco-funk songs like "Oh Sheit It's X" are infrequently composed.

Jonah Bromwich commented that no other musician has ever "sound[ed] so nonchalant about rolling". Likewise, Marcus J. Moore called the song an "MDMA-loving ode" whose lyrics present drug use as acceptable. Stevie Chick equated Thundercat's performance to Daryl Hall fronting Parliament and singing about an "MDMA adventure", praising the "I just wanna party" lyric.

"Oh Sheit It's X" was highlighted by various critics in their reviews of Apocalypse. Mike Diver compared the track to a collaboration between Justin Timberlake and Daft Punk, while other critics compared Thundercat's vocals to those of Marvin Gaye and Frank Ocean. Additional descriptions included being called "fantastic", "danceable", "romping [and] stomping", "a party grenade of wobbling funk", a "funk[y] and bracing" tune, and "the feel-good song of the year". The bassline was called "unreal" and "euphoric". Miles Bowe said the first thing one might say when listening to it is, "Oh shit! That bass!"

The song was ranked at number 29 on Rolling Stone's 100 Best Songs of 2013, with a commentary saying it was "[t]he most concentrated dose of disco joy", adding that Thundercat "goes all the way pop with an irresistibly melodic groove". Chris Bodenner from The Atlantic named it the "Track of the Day" on December 19, 2015.

== Credits ==
- Stephen "Thundercat" Bruner – songwriter, bass.
- Steven "Flying Lotus" Ellison – songwriter, producer.
- Charles "Mono/Poly" Dickerson – songwriter, producer.
- Durand Furbee – songwriter.
