= Golden Skies =

Studio album by Mono/Poly
- Released: August 26, 2014
- Genre: Electronic
- Length: 39:58
- Label: Brainfeeder
- Producer: Mono/Poly; Thundercat

Mono/Poly chronology
Paramatma (2010)	Golden Skies (2014)	Monotomic (2019)

Golden Skies is the second studio album by American electronic musician Mono/Poly. It was released via Brainfeeder on August 26, 2014. It features contributions from Mendee Ichikawa of Free Moral Agents, Rebekah Raff, Niki Randa, and Thundercat.

== Critical reception ==
Professional ratings
Review scores
Source	Rating
AllMusic	4/5 stars
The Line of Best Fit	7/10
Pitchfork	7.3/10
Tiny Mix Tapes	3/5 stars

Andy Kellman of AllMusic gave the album 4 stars out of 5, stating that it is "more complex, finessed, and melodic" than Mono/Poly's first studio album, Paramatma (2010). Matthew Phillips of Tiny Mix Tapes gave the album 3 stars out of 5, commenting that "Golden Skies' sleek beat structures leave just enough room for the complexity of the synthesis to shine before the melody pulls away your attention." Nate Patrin of Pitchfork gave the album a 7.3 of 10, writing, "The big hook on Golden Skies to pull listeners in centers around just what Mono/Poly does with well-known synthesizer sounds." He added, "The record resembles a lot of recent Brainfeeder-y stuff you might've heard before, except tinkered with a bit and with a more dazed approach to the cosmic allusions of Ras G's Back on the Planet, or the euphoric disorientation of Flying Lotus' Until the Quiet Comes and Thundercat's Apocalypse." Rory Foster of The Line of Best Fit gave the album a 7 out of 10, calling it "a distinctly spiritual journey, a soundtrack to the heavens, and not a bad one to boot."

== Track listing ==
All tracks are written by Charles Dickerson, except where noted.

No.	Title	Writer(s)	Length
1.	"Winds of Change"		3:28
2.	"Transit to the Golden Planet"	Dickerson; Rebekah Raff	2:26
3.	"Ra Rise"	Dickerson; Niki Randa	3:47
4.	"Golden Gate"		1:45
5.	"Golden Skies"		3:19
6.	"Light Age"		2:14
7.	"Alpha & Omega"		3:33
8.	"Urania"		3:20
9.	"Empyrean" (featuring Mendee Ichikawa)	Dickerson; Mendee Ichikawa	3:35
10.	"Dreamscape"		1:36
11.	"Night Garden"		3:51
12.	"Euphoria"		3:19
13.	"Gamma"	Dickerson; Stephen Bruner	3:44
Total length:			39:58
