= Lyla =

Lyla is a feminine given name. Notable people with the name include:

== People ==
- Lyla Berg (born 1951), Hawaiian politician
- Lyla Elliott (1934–2017), Australian politician
- Lyla Foy (aka WALL), London songwriter and solo artist, who garnered acclaim from performing in Black Cab Sessions
- Lyla Pinch Brock, Canadian Egyptologist
- Lyla Rocco (1933–2015), Italian film actress

== Fictional characters ==
- Lyla Garrity in the American TV series Friday Night Lights
- Lyla Lerrol, supporting character in Superman comics
- Lyla Michaels, a superheroine known as Harbringer in DC Comics
  - Lyla Michaels (Arrowverse), adaptation of the DC Comics character in the TV series Arrow
- Lylla, anthropomorphic otter in the Marvel Comics universe
  - Lylla (Marvel Cinematic Universe), the film adaptation of the Marvel Comics character
- Lyla, one of the main characters in the Australian TV series Mako Mermaids
- Lyla Novacek in the 2007 film August Rush
- Lyla (Marvel Comics), LYrate Lifeform Approximation, an assistant to Miguel O'Hara in Marvel Comics
- Lyla Loops, the main character in the children's animated series Lyla in the Loop

== See also ==
- Lyla (album), a 2003 album by jazz bassist Avishai Cohen
- "Lyla" (song), a 2005 single by Oasis
