= She Knows Too Much =

2026 single by Thundercat and Mac Miller

Single by Thundercat and Mac Miller

from the album Distracted
- Released: February 17, 2026
- Recorded: c. mid-2010s
- Genre: Hip-hop; funk
- Length: 3:33
- Label: Brainfeeder
- Songwriters: Stephen Bruner; Malcolm McCormick; Taylor Graves
- Producer: Greg Kurstin

Thundercat singles chronology
"I Did This to Myself" (2026)	"She Knows Too Much" (2026)	"ThunderWave" (2026)

Mac Miller singles chronology
"Funny Papers" (2025)	"She Knows Too Much" (2026)

Music video
- She Knows Too Much on YouTube

"She Knows Too Much" is a song by the American musician Thundercat with posthumous vocals from American rapper Mac Miller. It was released as the fourth single to the former's fifth studio album, Distracted (2026), on February 17, 2026, through Brainfeeder. A fusion of hip-hop and funk, the track narratively follows Thundercat in a relationship conflict with a woman who does not love him for who he is, with Miller assisting him throughout the track.

The song marks Miller's first appearance on a Thundercat project since Drunk (2017) as a bonus track, following the latter's various appearances on the former's projects since Faces (2014). It was originally conceptualized with production from Greg Kurstin in an unfinished state a few years prior to Miller's death. After years of being unreleased, Thundercat was granted permission from Miller's estate to finish "She Knows Too Much" and release it as a single.

On its release, the song earned critical acclaim from critics, praising its chemistry between Thundercat and Miller and the production. The song was released with an accompanying animated music video mixing traditional, CGI, and stop motion animation, produced by British animation company Blinkink. Narratively, the music video focuses on Thundercat's dream of him and Miller going on a road trip to various surrealistic places while being tempted by women. Commercially, "She Knows Too Much" peaked at number 18 on the US Hot R&B Songs chart.

== Background ==
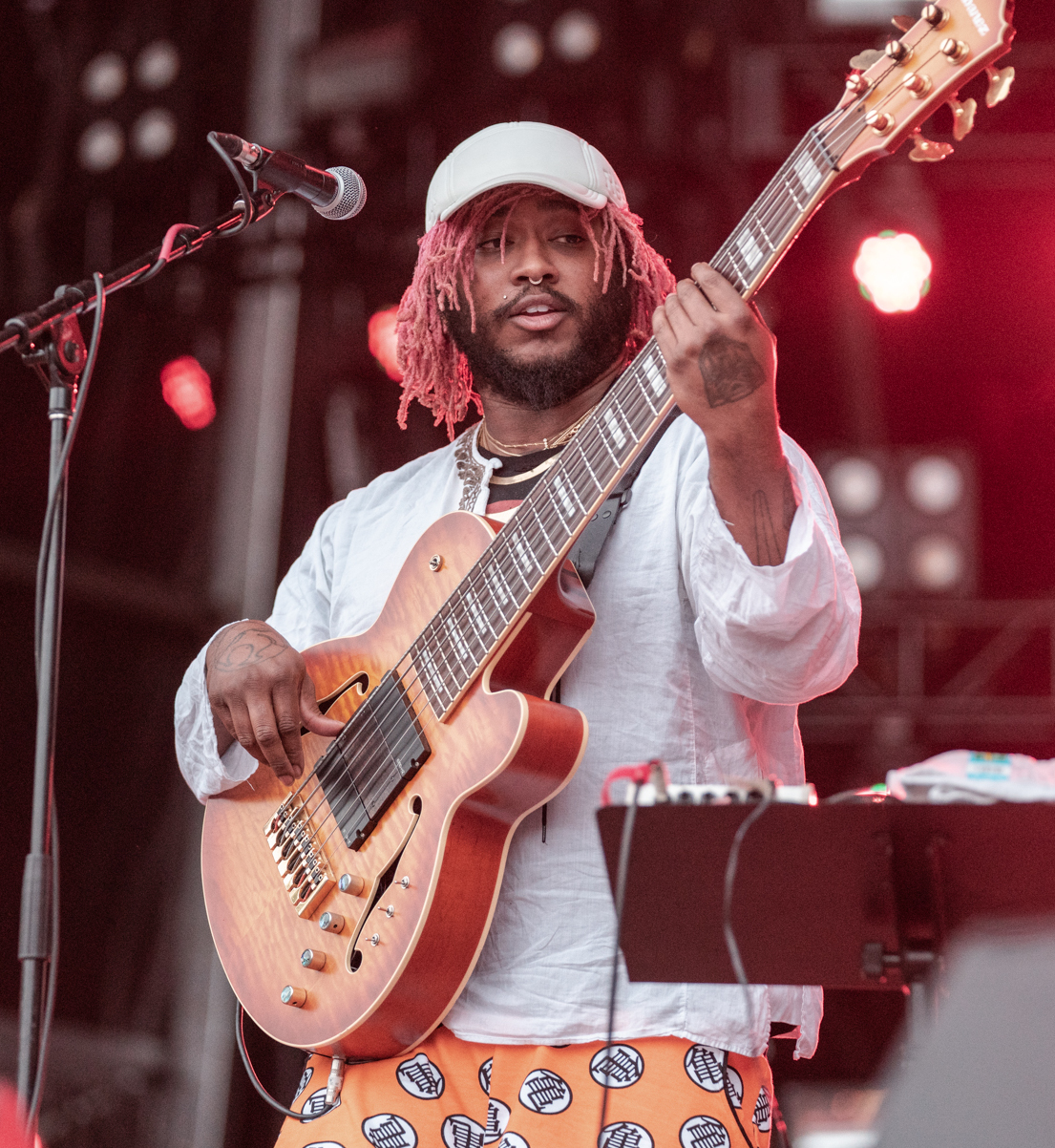
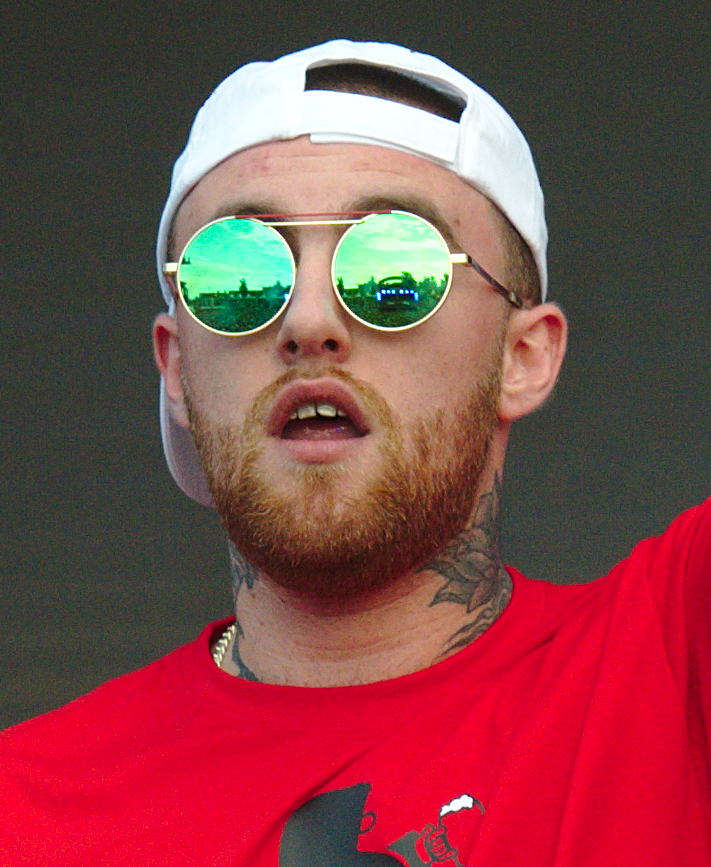
Thundercat (left) had a personal connection with Mac Miller (right), collaborating in each other's works until the latter's death in 2018.

American musician Thundercat collaborated with American rapper Mac Miller multiple times before the latter's death. First collaborating on the track "Live from Space" from Miller's live album Live from Space (2013), Thundercat appeared in each of Miller's projects since, producing three tracks and played bass on two tracks from his mixtape Faces (2014), playing bass on two tracks from GO:OD AM (2015), using additional vocals on the track "We" from his The Divine Feminine (2016), playing bass and using additional vocals on "What's the Use" from Swimming (2018), playing bass on two tracks from Circles (2020), and playing bass in the majority of tracks from Balloonerism (2025), with the latter recorded between 2014-2016. Miller gave back by recording vocals on "Hi", a bonus track from the Japanese edition of Thundercat's album Drunk (2017). In August 2018, Thundercat played bass on Miller's Tiny Desk Concert, an NPR Music program. The former later revealed he took a day off of his European tour to accompany Miller for that performance.

On September 6, 2018, Thundercat saw Miller for the last time through FaceTime, which was the night before they were both supposed to shoot the music video for the latter's song "What's the Use?", calling to tell Miller he loved him. The following day, Miller was found dead in his Studio City home by his personal assistant, having died from an accidental overdose of a "mixed drug toxicity" of fentanyl, cocaine, and alcohol. With Thundercat having been a "raging alcoholic" for the past fifteen years, he became sober in 2019, a year after Miller's death.

Following his death, Thundercat gave multiple tributes to Miller. On October 31, 2018, he performed at the Mac Miller: A Celebration of Life concert, playing "What's the Use?" with assistance from Vince Staples. In August 2019, he played bass for Ty Dolla Sign's Tiny Desk Concert, including Miller's 2016 song "Cinderella". In March 2020, Thundercat released the single "Fair Change" for his fourth studio album It Is What It Is, entirely dedicated to Miller. The album's title was influenced by Thundercat's existential dread, including the loss of Miller. On July 31, Thundercat revealed he recorded a collaborative album with Miller. In 2023, during an interview with Vibe, Thundercat reflected on how Miller impacted his life significantly five years after his death, feeling emotional when asked about his former collaborator. Responding to the question, Thundercat was close friends with Miller, calling him "always genius", "too cool", and a "one-man Rat Pack".

In promotion of his fifth studio album, Distracted (2026), Thundercat released its lead single, "No More Lies" with Tame Impala, in April 2023. In September 2025, he released its second single, "I Wish I Didn't Waste Your Time" with Remi Wolf. On January 29, 2026, he announced the album and released its third single, "I Did This To Myself" featuring Lil Yachty.

== Composition ==
"She Knows Too Much"
A fusion of hip-hop and funk, the song begins with Miller's chorus while Thundercat serves with backing vocals and bass guitar.

Featuring pop veteran producer Greg Kurstin and keyboardist Taylor Graves, "She Knows Too Much" was recorded a few years prior to Miller's death, and nearly a decade before the song's release. It remained unfinished, initially as a "half-recorded preview", by the time of his death. Infused with Thundercat's basslines and falsetto at a runtime of three minutes and thirty-three seconds, "She Knows Too Much" captures the "warm synergy between two friends" in an embracement of hip-hop and funk. "Trippy and idiosyncratic", the song embraces pop tropes, humor, and playfulness in contrast to the heavy themes prevalent in much of Thundercat's work, with him wanting listeners to "enjoy it and have fun". In contrast to Thundercat's work, Miller provides a significant role in the song while the former provides backing vocals and bass.

Lyrically, "She Knows Too Much" is based on searching love for a woman with both beauty and intelligence. It begins with Thundercat, overshadowed with imposter syndrome, being conflicted with a woman who does not love him for who he is, before his friend Miller serves personally and rhythmically with "you can talk about the universe and energy but all you really want is a celebrity", making Thundercat realize his girlfriend's superficiality than initially thought. By the conclusion, Thundercat accepts a woman who loves him for his character rather than what's inside him.

== Release and reception ==
On February 17, 2026, "She Knows Too Much" was released to streaming services by Brainfeeder, as the fourth single to Thundercat's fifth studio album, Distracted (2026). The musician received permission from Miller's estate to complete and release the song. Reflecting on its production, Thundercat commented on how grateful he felt spending time with Miller before his death. "What an artist, what a spirit, what a joy to have experienced", he finished.

Quincy of Ratings Game Music praised the duo's chemistry throughout the song, considering it a "timeless, funky, energetic vibe" as expected from a Thundercat track. Shahzaib Hussain of Clash considered it to be his most accessible record, likening the warm energy and popular tropes, with Trey Alston of Consequence considering it a "bittersweet gem". Commercially, "She Knows Too Much" peaked at number 18 on the US Hot R&B Songs chart on the week of March 7, 2026, lasting for two weeks.

== Animated music video ==
Three different shots from the music video, highlighting different animated styles and techniques with surrealism intact.

The single was also released with an accompanying animated music video. Throughout the animated music video, Thundercat and Mac Miller go out on a surrealistic road trip on their 1964 Chevy Impala, venturing through a neon-lit red light district, roller-coaster cityscape, a disco-themed bowling alley, and other various places through different animated mediums. Narratively, they are "tempted and tormented" by various women, until Thundercat wakes up to what was actually a dream, later seeing the Moon as Miller's head, winking at him as an indication of his memory. Compared to the visuals of Everything Everywhere All at Once (2022) and Inception (2010), the music video provides a "vibrant, joyful tribute to the pair's friendship."

The music video was directed by Léa Esmaili and produced by British animation company Blinkink, with VFX from Mathematic. Animators involved include Joshua Clauss, Louise Bailly, Thomas Bertrand, Turçin Soylu, Lola Lefévre, Tom Jeanbourquin, and Valentin Gaubert. Reflecting on the music video, Josef Byrne, executive producer of Blinkink, felt "honored and humbled" along with his team to work with Miller's estate. The music video's director, Léa Esmaili, revealed she wanted to create the animated music video by mixing various styles, whether traditional, CGI, or stop motion, on a "burlesque narrative" of the two who spend a wild road trip together, tying to their friendship and fondness of anime.

== Personnel ==
Credits were adapted from Tidal.

- Thundercat – vocals, writing, bass guitar
- Mac Miller – vocals, writing
- Greg Kurstin – producer, engineer, rhodes
- Taylor Graves – writing, keyboard
- Maurice Brown – trombone, trumpet
- Emily Lazar – mastering
- Bob DeMaa – assistant mastering
- Julian Berg – engineer
- Matt Tuggle – engineer

== Charts ==
Weekly chart performance
Chart (2026)	Peak position
US Hot R&B Songs (Billboard)	18
