= Golden Sky =

Golden Sky or Golden Skies may refer to:

== Music ==
- Golden Sky (The Holidays EP), 2010
- Golden Sky (The Teenage Kissers EP), 2016
- Golden Sky, an album by Smile.dk, 2002
- "Golden Sky", a song by God Is an Astronaut from Age of the Fifth Sun, 2010
- Golden Skies, an album by Mono/Poly, 2014
- "Golden Skies", a song by Segression, recording as Side Effect X

== Other uses ==
- Golden Sky, a 2009 art exhibition by Yu Hong
- Golden Sky, a Thoroughbred racehorse, winner of the 1908 Prix Jean-Luc Lagardère
- Golden Skies, a 1992 publication by Gérard Coste
