= Mono/Poly =

- Born: Charles E. Dickerson; February 5, 1987 (age 39); Bakersfield, California, U.S.
- Genres: Electronic, experimental, alternative hip-hop, glitch
- Occupation: Producer
- Years active: 2008-present
- Labels: Brainfeeder; Vision Recordings; Faces Records; Fat City Records
- Website: monoxpoly.com

Charles E. Dickerson (born February 5, 1987), better known by his stage name Mono/Poly, is a Grammy Award-winning electronic music producer from Bakersfield, California.

== Career ==
Mono/Poly joined the record label Brainfeeder and released the Manifestations EP in 2011. He self-released the free EP, Killer B's, in 2012. The Golden Skies album was released on Brainfeeder in 2014.

== Discography ==
=== Albums ===
- Paramatma (2010)
- Golden Skies (2014)
- Monotomic (2019)
- Messages from the Cosmic Sea (2020)
- Moonlight To Sunlight (2024)

=== EPs ===
- The George Machine (2009)
- Manifestations (2011)
- Killer B's (2012)
- Cryptic (2016)
- Union (2017)
- As Long As That Love Is Divine (2020)

=== Singles ===
- "Bubble Sort" b/w "For Progressive Minds" (2008)
- "Oil Field" b/w "Medusa" (2009)
- "Stacking’ Ones" b/w “Teach You All A Lesson” (2019)

=== Productions ===
- Flash Bang Grenada - "In a Perfect World" from 10 Haters (2011)
- Thundercat - "Heartbreaks + Setbacks" from Apocalypse (2013)
- Thundercat - "Oh Sheit It's X" from Apocalypse (2013)
- Busdriver - "Upsweep" from Perfect Hair (2014)
- Tha Dogg Pound - "Skip Skip" (2015)
- Ne-Yo - "Religious / Ratchet Wit Yo Friends" from Non-Fiction (2015)
- Thundercat - "Song for the Dead" and "Lone Wolf and Cub" from The Beyond / Where the Giants Roam (2015)
- Busdriver - "Hyperbolic 2" from Thumbs (2015)
- Kendrick Lamar - "Untitled 08 | 09.06.2014" from Untitled Unmastered (2016)
- Thundercat - "Friend Zone" from Drunk (2017)
- Thundercat - "Black Qualls" from It Is What It Is (2020)
- Thundercat - "Funny Thing" from it Is What It Is (2020)

=== Remixes ===
- Flying Lotus - "Melt!" from L.A. EP 2 X 3 (2008)
- Take - "Quartz for Amber" from Only Mountain: The Remixes (2011)
- Lorn - "Weigh Me Down" from Weigh Me Down (2012)
- S.Maharba - "Nice to Meet You" from S.Maharba: Remixed (2013)
- Nocando - "Zero Hour" from Jimmy the Burnout (2014)
- Sofie Letitre - "I Need" from Uncanny Valley (2015)
- Seven Davis Jr. - "Try Me (I'll Funk You)" (2015)
- Saul Williams - "Down For Some Ignorance [Mono/Poly Remix]" from "These Mthrfckrs: MartyrLoserKing - Remixes, B-Sides & Demos"
- Noisia - "Miniatures" from Outer Edges: Remixes (2017)

=== Compilation appearances ===
- "For Progressive Minds" on Circulations & Jay Scarlett Present: New Worlds (2008)
- "Red and Yellow Toys" on Wild Angels (2009)
- "The Nomad" (with Noisia) on Division VA EP 002 (2016)
- “Funkzilla” (with Seven Davis Jr) on “Brainfeeder X” (2018)
