= Distracted (album) =

2026 studio album by Thundercat

Studio album by Thundercat
- Released: April 3, 2026
- Studio: No Expectations (Hollywood)
- Length: 46:42
- Label: Brainfeeder
- Producers: Kenneth Charles Blume III; Stephen Bruner; Flying Lotus; Greg Kurstin; The Lemon Twigs; Kevin Parker

Thundercat chronology
It Is What It Is (2020)	Distracted (2026)

Singles from Distracted
- 1. "No More Lies" Released: April 25, 2023; 2. "I Wish I Didn't Waste Your Time" Released: September 15, 2025; 3. "I Did This to Myself" Released: January 29, 2026; 4. "She Knows Too Much" Released: February 17, 2026; 5. "ThunderWave" Released: March 10, 2026

Distracted is the fifth studio album by American musician Thundercat, released through Brainfeeder on April 3, 2026. His first album in six years following his previous LP, It Is What It Is, it was preceded by five singles: "No More Lies" with Tame Impala, "I Wish I Didn't Waste Your Time", "I Did This to Myself" featuring Lil Yachty, "She Knows Too Much" featuring Mac Miller, and "ThunderWave" featuring Willow Smith.

The album was executive produced by Thundercat and Greg Kurstin, with additional credits from Flying Lotus, Kenny Beats and the Lemon Twigs. It also features guest appearances from Tame Impala, Lil Yachty, ASAP Rocky, Channel Tres, Beck, Haley Joel Osment, Domi and JD Beck, and Willow, as well as a posthumous feature by Mac Miller.

== Release and promotion ==
In April 2023, Thundercat and Tame Impala released the single "No More Lies". Thundercat released the double single "I Wish I Didn't Waste Your Time" and "Children of the Baked Potato", the latter featuring Remi Wolf, in September 2025. On January 29, 2026, he announced the album and released its lead single, "I Did This to Myself" featuring Lil Yachty. On February 17, 2026, he released the single "She Knows Too Much" featuring Mac Miller. On March 10, 2026, he released the single "ThunderWave", featuring Willow Smith.

He is scheduled to embark on the Distracted AF Tour in North America in support of the album. It is set to begin on October 10, 2026 in Miami and conclude on Dec 11, 2026 in Austin, Texas, with Channel Tres, TiaCorine, Fera, 54 Ultra, and Kitty Ca$h as opening acts.

== Critical reception ==
Professional ratings
Aggregate scores
Source	Rating
AnyDecentMusic?	7.6/10
Metacritic	81/100
Review scores
Source	Rating
AllMusic	4/5 stars
Mojo	4/5 stars
MusicOMH	3.5/5 stars
Paste	C+
Pitchfork	7.8/10
Rolling Stone	3.5/5 stars
Uncut	8/10

Distracted received critical acclaim upon release. On the review aggregator website Metacritic, the album received a weighted average score of 81 from 100 based on ten reviews, indicating "universal acclaim". The review aggregator site AnyDecentMusic? compiled twelve reviews and gave the album an average of 7.6 out of 10, based on their assessment of the critical consensus.

Writing for Rolling Stone, Will Hermes praised the album for its more restrained and focused approach, noting that Thundercat's virtuosic playing supports the songwriting rather than overpowering it, while highlighting its cohesive, retro-influenced sound and themes of modern anxiety. Tallie Spencer of HotNewHipHop wrote, "Even with heavier themes, Thundercat keeps his signature lightness intact, balancing introspection with humor and warmth. At this point, Thundercat isn’t chasing anything. He’s just refining a lane that’s fully his." The Wall Street Journal's Mark Richardson called the album "a subtle yet complex offering whose tranquil exterior masks an apprehensive core."

Paste's Grant Sharples gave the album a C+ grade and wrote, "Stephen Bruner’s first album in six years contains glimmers of his in-the-pocket bass skills, but it too often cedes ground to mid-tempo monotony."

== Track listing ==
Distracted track listing
No.	Title	Writer(s)	Producer(s)	Length
1.	"Candlelight"	Stephen Bruner; Greg Kurstin; JD Beck; Domi Louna	Kurstin	2:35
2.	"No More Lies" (featuring Tame Impala)	Bruner; Kevin Parker	Bruner; Parker	5:27
3.	"She Knows Too Much" (featuring Mac Miller)	Bruner; Malcolm McCormick; Taylor Graves	Kurstin	3:33
4.	"I Did This to Myself" (featuring Lil Yachty and Flying Lotus)	Bruner; Steven Ellison; Miles Parks McCollum	Flying Lotus	2:30
5.	"Funny Friends" (featuring ASAP Rocky)	Bruner; Rakim Mayers; Kurstin	Kurstin	2:35
6.	"What Is Left to Say" (with the Lemon Twigs)	Bruner; Brian D'Addario; Michael D'Addario; Kenneth Charles Blume III	Blume; The Lemon Twigs	3:39
7.	"I Wish I Didn't Waste Your Time"	Bruner; Kurstin	Kurstin	2:44
8.	"Anakin Learns His Fate"	Bruner; Kurstin	Kurstin	3:22
9.	"Walking on the Moon"	Bruner; Kurstin	Kurstin	3:25
10.	"This Thing We Call Love" (featuring Channel Tres)	Bruner; Channel Tres	Kurstin	3:15
11.	"ThunderWave" (featuring Willow)	Bruner; Kurstin; Willow	Kurstin	3:14
12.	"Pozole"	Bruner; B. D'Addario; M. D'Addardio	Bruner; The Lemon Twigs	2:40
13.	"A.D.D. Through the Roof"	Bruner; Kurstin	Kurstin	3:36
14.	"Great Americans"	Bruner; Ellison	Flying Lotus	2:13
15.	"You Left Without Saying Goodbye"	Bruner	Bruner	1:54
Total length:				46:42

== Personnel ==
Credits are adapted from the album's liner notes and Tidal.

- Thundercat – vocals, bass guitar
- Emily Lazar – mastering
- Bob DeMaa – mastering assistance
- Miles Showell – half-speed cut
- Greg Kurstin – synthesizer (tracks 1, 5, 7–11, 13), mixing (1, 4, 6, 8, 9, 12, 14, 15), keyboards (1, 8, 9, 11), piano (1), engineering (3–5, 7, 9, 11, 13), Rhodes (3, 7, 8, 13), drums (5, 7–9, 13), percussion (5, 11), acoustic guitar (9), congas (11)
- Julian Burg – engineering (1, 3–5, 7–9, 11, 13), programming (8)
- Matt Tuggle – engineering (1, 3–5, 7–9, 11, 13)
- JD Beck – drums, vocals (1)
- Domi Louna – synthesizer, vocals (1)
- Vikram Devasthali – trombone (1)
- Jordan Katz – trumpet (1)
- Juliane Gralle – bass trombone (1)
- Gerald Albright – performance (1)
- Dan Reckard – alto saxophone, tenor saxophone (1)
- Kevin Parker – performance, mixing (2)
- Spike Stent – mixing (3, 5, 7, 10, 11, 13)
- Mac Miller – vocals, programming (3)
- Taylor Graves – keyboards (3)
- Maurice Brown – trombone, trumpet (3)
- Vic Wainstein – engineering (4, 6, 10–12, 14)
- Flying Lotus – programming (4, 14), keyboards (4), synthesizer (14)
- Lil Yachty – vocals (4)
- Miguel Atwood-Ferguson – string arrangement, viola (4)
- Beck – vocals (5, 9)
- ASAP Rocky – vocals (5)
- Brian D'Addario – performance (6, 12)
- Michael D'Addario – performance (6, 12)
- Kenneth Blume – engineering (6)
- Nick Lee – performance (6)
- Aaron Paris – performance (6)
- Pedro Martins – guitar (7)
- Haley Joel Osment – vocals (8)
- Channel Tres – vocals, programming (10)
- Willow – vocals (11)
- Dennis Hamm – synthesizer (11)
- Neil Krug – photography, layout, design

== Charts ==
Chart performance for Distracted
Chart (2026)	Peak position
Australian Albums (ARIA)	28
Belgian Albums (Ultratop Flanders)	114
Belgian Albums (Ultratop Wallonia)	61
Dutch Albums (Album Top 100)	51
French Albums (SNEP)	112
German Albums (Offizielle Top 100)	54
Irish Independent Albums (IRMA)	12
Japanese Albums (Oricon)	34
Japanese Dance & Soul Albums (Oricon)	2
Japanese Download Albums (Billboard Japan)	30
New Zealand Albums (RMNZ)	28
Portuguese Albums (AFP)	194
Scottish Albums (Official Charts)	8
Swiss Albums (Schweizer Hitparade)	68
UK Albums (Official Charts)	76
UK Independent Albums (Official Charts)	3
UK R&B Albums (Official Charts)	1
US Billboard 200	116
US Independent Albums (Billboard)	19
US Top R&B/Hip-Hop Albums (Billboard)	34

== Release history ==
Release formats for Distracted
Region	Date	Format	Label	Ref.
Various	April 3, 2026	CD; digital download; streaming; vinyl	Brainfeeder	
