= The Golden Age of Apocalypse =

Studio album by Thundercat
- Released: August 29, 2011
- Genres: Jazz fusion; electronic; R&B
- Length: 37:24
- Label: Brainfeeder
- Producers: Flying Lotus, Thundercat

Thundercat chronology
The Golden Age of Apocalypse (2011)	Apocalypse (2013)

The Golden Age of Apocalypse is the debut studio album by Thundercat, released on August 29, 2011.

== Critical reception ==
Professional ratings
Aggregate scores
Source	Rating
AnyDecentMusic?	7.1/10
Metacritic	80/100
Review scores
Source	Rating
AllMusic	4/5 stars
Beats Per Minute	78%
The Boston Phoenix	4/4 stars
Consequence of Sound	A−
Drowned in Sound	7/10
The Guardian	3/5 stars
MusicOMH	4/5 stars
Pitchfork	8.1/10
Slant Magazine	3/5 stars
Uncut	3/5 stars

At Metacritic, which assigns a weighted average score out of 100 to reviews from mainstream critics, The Golden Age of Apocalypse received an average score of 80% based on 21 reviews, indicating "generally favorable reviews".

It was listed by Sean J. O'Connell of LA Weekly as one of the "Top 5 Los Angeles Jazz Albums of 2011".

== Track listing ==
All tracks are written by Thundercat except where noted.

No.	Title	Writer(s)	Length
1.	"Hooooooo"		0:22
2.	"Daylight"		2:56
3.	"Fleer Ultra"		2:14
4.	"Is It Love?"		5:37
5.	"For Love I Come"	George Duke	3:35
6.	"It Really Doesn't Matter to You"		3:33
7.	"Jamboree"		3:45
8.	"Boat Cruise"		3:45
9.	"Seasons"		2:18
10.	"Goldenboy"		3:04
11.	"Walkin'"		2:06
12.	"Mystery Machine (The Golden Age of Apocalypse)"		2:05
13.	"Return to the Journey"		2:04
Total length:			37:24

Bonus Track for Japan; Alternate Artwork
No.	Title	Length
14.	"$200 TB"	2:19
Total length:		39:43

== Personnel ==
- Thundercat – vocals, bass, keyboards, production
- Cameron Graves – keyboards, programming
- Ronald Bruner Jr. – drums, percussion
- Kamasi Washington – saxophones
- Hadrien Feraud - bass
- Austin Peralta – keyboards
- Oliver Johnson (Dorian Concept) - keyboards
- Steven Ellison (Flying Lotus) – production, keyboards, programming
- Miguel Atwood-Ferguson – strings
- Brandon Coleman - keyboards
- Chris Dave - drums
- Erykah Badu - backing vocals
- Shafiq Husayn - programming, drums
- Om'Mas Keith - backing vocals
- Taylor Graves - keyboards
- Brook “D’Leau” Davis (J*Davey) - keyboards
- Daddy Kev - mastering engineer

== Charts ==
Chart	Peak position
Top Dance/Electronic Albums	1
Heatseekers Albums	18
