= Black Cab Sessions =

Series of performances recorded in a black cab

The Black Cab Sessions is a series of one-song performances by musicians and poets recorded in the back of a black cab and filmed for an internet audience. A black cab is a type of hackney carriage (taxicab, An Austin FX4 or a Metrocab) common in Britain. The sessions are recorded while the black cab that serves as the studio travels through city streets, usually in London, England. Most of the performances feature rock bands, ranging from popular acts such as Death Cab for Cutie, The Kooks and My Morning Jacket to lesser known acts such as the Cave Singers. Other performances stray from the rock music scene, featuring poetry and beatboxing, for example.

The motto of the Black Cab Sessions is "one song, one take, one cab." These performances have gained a cult following of viewers both on their own website and on YouTube.

== Format ==
The Black Cab Sessions video clips begin with a screen showing the name of the artist and date the session was recorded. This is followed by a shot of the cab driver, who has just been informed that his cab will play host to the sessions, introducing the artist. The artists then give their performance.

During the performances, the artists often have to react to the unusual venue. For example, during the New Pornographers session, the two musicians can be seen bouncing up and down in their seats as the cab hits speed bumps. The performances are also shaped by the limited space afforded by the back of a black cab. The uploads of acoustic acts with a different premise is a very popular one, with different projects using different selling points, Acts Unsigned, Tea and Biscuit Sessions and many others using the niche to get views. Many of the bands that play are only represented by part of the band, for example. In at least one instance, when singer/harpist Joanna Newsom was invited to perform, the fact that her harp would not fit in the cab kept her from contributing at all.

== Production ==
The Black Cab Sessions were conceived by Jono Stevens and produced as a partnership between Hidden Fruit (Gen Stevens and Chris Pattinson) and Just So Films (Jonny Madderson and Will Evans).

One of the producers reports that about 10 per cent of the cab drivers approached by the producers turns them down, thinking that the idea is weird, but that those who do participate enjoy it.

Filming of the Black Cab Sessions began in May, 2007 and is ongoing.

== Artists ==
The following artists have performed in the Black Cab Sessions:

- Amanda Palmer
- Au Revoir Simone
- Baby Dee
- Band of Horses
- Beach House
- Benjamin Zephaniah
- Bombay Bicycle Club
- Bon Iver
- Brian Wilson
- The Brightlights
- Brute Chorus
- Bill Callahan
- Chairlift
- Cold War Kids
- Damien Jurado
- Daniel Johnston
- Death Cab for Cutie
- Driver Drive Faster
- Elvis Perkins
- Emmy the Great
- Eugene McGuinness
- Fanfarlo
- The Felice Brothers
- Fireworks Night
- Fleet Foxes
- Freddie Stevenson
- The Futureheads
- Grizzly Bear
- Hafdis Huld
- Holly Miranda
- Hot Club de Paris
- Jeffrey Lewis
- Johnny Byers
- Johnny Flynn
- Nic Dawson Kelly
- Killa Kella
- The Kooks
- Langhorne Slim
- Laura Marling
- Lightspeed Champion
- Luke Toms
- Lykke Li
- Micah P Hinson
- The Mules
- Mumford & Sons
- My Morning Jacket
- The National
- The New Pornographers
- Noah and the Whale with Laura Marling
- Official Secrets Act
- Okkervil River
- Pete and the Pirates
- Phosphorescent
- The Raveonettes
- Richard Thompson
- Robyn Hitchcock
- Rufus Wainwright
- Ryan Adams with Neal Casal
- Seven Davis Jr.
- Scout Niblett
- Seasick Steve
- The Staves
- Stephen Fretwell
- Sugababes
- Charlie Siem
- Speech Debelle
- Spoon
- The Square
- St. Vincent
- Stricken City
- Sunset Rubdown
- Vincent Vincent and the Villains
- VV Brown
- Wildbirds & Peacedrums
