= It Is What It Is (Thundercat album) =

Studio album by Thundercat
- Released: April 3, 2020
- Genres: Jazz fusion; R&B; jazztronica; lo-fi
- Length: 37:38
- Label: Brainfeeder
- Producers: BadBadNotGood; Flying Lotus; Mono/Poly; Sounwave; Steve Lacy; Taylor Graves; Thundercat

Thundercat chronology
Drunk (2017)	It Is What It Is (2020)	Distracted (2026)

Singles from It Is What It Is
- 1. "King of the Hill" Released: October 30, 2018; 2. "Black Qualls" Released: January 15, 2020; 3. "Dragonball Durag" Released: February 17, 2020; 4. "Fair Chance" Released: March 17, 2020; 5. "Innerstellar Love" Released: April 2, 2020

It Is What It Is is the fourth studio album by American musician Thundercat, released through Brainfeeder on April 3, 2020. It was preceded by five singles: "King of the Hill", which was released as a single from the label's compilation album Brainfeeder X in 2018, and "Black Qualls", "Dragonball Durag", "Fair Chance", and "Innerstellar Love", the latter four being released in 2020. The track "Unrequited Love" had previously been used in an episode of the anime Carole & Tuesday in 2019. The album was executive produced by Thundercat and Flying Lotus, and features guest appearances from Louis Cole, Steve Lacy, Steve Arrington, Childish Gambino, Ty Dolla Sign, Lil B, Kamasi Washington, BadBadNotGood, and Zack Fox.

It Is What It Is received critical acclaim, with critics praising Thundercat's typical sense of humor in his lyrics and bass playing, as well as Thundercat's way of expressing emotions – in particular, his grief over the loss of long-time close friend and collaborator Mac Miller, which feeds into many of the musical and lyrical elements of the album. The title track of the album contains a vocal sample from the late Miller; Thundercat also dedicated the album in his memory.

The album won Best Progressive R&B Album at the 63rd Annual Grammy Awards, beating out fellow nominees Jhené Aiko, Chloe x Halle, Free Nationals, and Robert Glasper.

== Critical reception ==
Professional ratings
Aggregate scores
Source	Rating
AnyDecentMusic?	7.9/10
Metacritic	84/100
Review scores
Source	Rating
AllMusic	4.5/5 stars
Exclaim!	9/10
The Independent	4/5 stars
Mojo	4/5 stars
NME	4/5 stars
The Observer	3/5 stars
Pitchfork	7.4/10
Rolling Stone	3.5/5 stars
The Times	4/5 stars
Uncut	9/10

It Is What It Is was met with critical acclaim. At Metacritic, the album received an average score of 84, based on 23 reviews. Aggregator AnyDecentMusic? gave it 7.9 out of 10, based on their assessment of the critical consensus.

Writing for AllMusic, Andy Kellman gave the album a positive review, stating that "As on the earlier Thundercat LPs, outer space and homeboy escapades, comic courtship and elusive companionship, and philosophical insights also inform the material." Kellman continued by stating that the album contains "no throwaways or novelty tunes." Emma Finamore of Clash was also positive in her review, stating that the album's "definitely a project rich in contrasts." Finamore further opined that it's "an album embracing difference, accepting highs and lows: just what we need right now." Exclaim!'s reviewer Dylan Barnabe acclaimed the album, saying that "There is perhaps no better album with which to face our current uncertainty than Thundercat's It Is What It Is. Filled with gentle reflections on love and loss, mixed in with the star bassist's signature sense of humour and funky beats, it is exactly the record the world needed." Barnabe praised Thundercat's implementation of humor elements on the album, particularly praising the song "Dragonball Durag". Barnabe further stated that the album "manifests as a beautiful ebb and flow of emotional states, philosophical musings and plain old comedy." Roisin O'Connor of The Independent favorably compared the album to its predecessor, Drunk, stating that both records "continue to reflect on Thundercat's acceptance of his own mortality, veering away from an almost-claustrophobic grief and into deeper contemplation." Writing for NME, Sam Moore stated that the album's "magic moment comes as Thundercat links up with Steve Lacy, Childish Gambino and '80s funk hero Steve Arrington on 'Black Qualls'; the disco-funk tune should be up for consideration as the best song of 2020. Its inclusion here gives a comforting indication that, for all of the album's heavy rumination on life, death and healing, Thundercat can still kick back when required." Moore commented on the album's lyrics, which depicts a variety of themes, stating that " Thundercat's lyrical reflections on grief, uncertainty and gradual healing are threaded through 'It Is What It Is'." Pitchfork's reviewer Reed Jackson gave the album a positive review, but also criticized the composition and songwriting on a few of the album's tracks. Jackson also called it more "unpolished" than its predecessor, while at the same time praising Thundercat's bass playing.

In a more mixed review, Kitty Empire of The Observer stated that "The track-listing also finds ample time for these more dense jazz-funk fusions – hyper-speed snippets like How Sway, where Bruner reminds listeners he isn't from the mainstream, he's just visiting from somewhere altogether gnarlier. It all makes for an album that gently weeps, then does a set of star jumps. Bruner's quick mind and faster fingers dash off on tangents, never quite exploring his grooves to their fullest extents." Empire continued by stating the album's drawback lays with the fact that it switches through emotions too often. She stated that Thundercat "doesn't sit with one emotion, be it high or low, for a sustained length of time. When the title track glides in, at a luxurious five minutes (even if it is in two parts), you wish Thundercat had given all his ideas the benefit of the album's title – It Is What It Is. You wish for a record that allowed Bruner to do less and just… be."

=== Accolades ===
Accolades for It Is What It Is
Publication	Accolade	Rank	Ref.
Billboard	Billboard's 50 Best Albums of 2020 – Mid-Year	N/A	
Consequence of Sound	Top 50 Albums of 2020	14	
Double J	Top 50 Albums of 2020	27	
Exclaim!	Exclaim!'s 50 Best Albums of 2020	12	
The Los Angeles Times	Top 10 Albums of 2020	4	
NPR	The 50 Best Albums of 2020	31	
Paste	Paste's 25 Best Albums of 2020 – Mid-Year	15	
Paste	The 50 Best Albums of 2020	15	
PopMatters	The 60 Best Albums of 2020	12	
Stereogum	Stereogum's 50 Best Albums of 2020 – Mid-Year	15	
Stereogum	The 50 Best Albums of 2020	27	
Vulture	Top 10 Albums of 2020	8	

== Track listing ==
It Is What It Is track listing
No.	Title	Writer(s)	Producer(s)	Length
1.	"Lost in Space / Great Scott / 22-26"	Stephen Bruner; Steven Ellison; Scott Kinsey	Thundercat; Flying Lotus	1:22
2.	"Innerstellar Love"	Bruner; Ellison	Thundercat; Flying Lotus	2:41
3.	"I Love Louis Cole" (featuring Louis Cole)	Bruner; Cole	Thundercat; Flying Lotus	3:24
4.	"Black Qualls" (featuring Steve Lacy, Steve Arrington, and Childish Gambino)	Bruner; Lacy; Arrington; Donald Glover; Charles Dickerson; Ellison; Miguel Atwood-Ferguson	Thundercat; Flying Lotus; Mono/Poly; Lacy	3:09
5.	"Miguel's Happy Dance"	Bruner; Ellison; Atwood-Ferguson	Thundercat; Flying Lotus	2:11
6.	"How Sway"	Bruner; Ellison; Dennis Hamm	Thundercat; Flying Lotus	1:14
7.	"Funny Thing"	Bruner; Dickerson; Hamm	Thundercat; Flying Lotus; Mono/Poly	1:56
8.	"Overseas" (featuring Zack Fox)	Bruner; Ellison; Mark Spears	Thundercat; Flying Lotus; Sounwave	1:28
9.	"Dragonball Durag"	Bruner; Ellison	Thundercat; Flying Lotus	3:01
10.	"How I Feel"	Bruner; Taylor Graves	Thundercat; Graves	1:08
11.	"King of the Hill"	Bruner; Ellison; Alexander Sowinski; Chester Hansen; Leland Whitty; Matty Tavares	Thundercat; Flying Lotus; BadBadNotGood	2:51
12.	"Unrequited Love"	Bruner; Ellison	Thundercat; Flying Lotus	3:14
13.	"Fair Chance" (featuring Ty Dolla Sign and Lil B)	Bruner; Spears; Tyrone Griffin, Jr.; Brandon McCartney	Thundercat; Flying Lotus; Sounwave	3:57
14.	"Existential Dread"	Bruner; Ellison	Thundercat; Flying Lotus	0:51
15.	"It Is What It Is" (featuring Pedro Martins)	Bruner; Ellison; Martins	Thundercat; Flying Lotus	5:02
Total length:				37:38

It Is What It Is – Japanese edition (bonus track)
No.	Title	Writer(s)	Producer(s)	Length
16.	"Bye for Now" (featuring Michael McDonald)	Bruner; Michael McDonald	Thundercat; Flying Lotus	2:16
Total length:				39:54

== Personnel ==
Technical personnel

- Flying Lotus – production, mixing
- Thundercat – production
- Daddy Kev – mixing, mastering

Artwork

- Eddie Alcazar – photography
- Adam Stover – layout, design
- Zack Fox – gatefold artwork

Additional musicians

- Kamasi Washington
- BadBadNotGood
- Miguel Atwood-Ferguson
- Sounwave
- Mono/Poly
- Dennis Hamm
- Ronald Bruner Jr.
- Brandon Coleman
- Taylor Graves
- Scott Kinsey

== Charts ==
Chart performance for It Is What It Is
Chart (2020)	Peak position
Australian Albums (ARIA)	50
Austrian Albums (Ö3 Austria)	73
Belgian Albums (Ultratop Flanders)	28
Canadian Albums (Billboard)	87
Dutch Albums (Album Top 100)	66
French Albums (SNEP)	152
German Albums (Offizielle Top 100)	30
Irish Albums (IRMA)	95
Japanese Albums (Oricon)	25
New Zealand Albums (RMNZ)	36
Scottish Albums (Official Charts)	6
Swiss Albums (Schweizer Hitparade)	56
UK Albums (Official Charts)	23
US Billboard 200	38
US Top R&B/Hip-Hop Albums (Billboard)	23

== See also ==
- List of 2020 albums
