= The Beyond / Where the Giants Roam =

EP by Thundercat
- Released: June 22, 2015
- Genre: Jazz-funk; funk; R&B; soul
- Length: 16:08
- Label: Brainfeeder
- Producer: Flying Lotus (exec.); Mono/Poly; Thundercat (exec.)

Thundercat chronology
Apocalypse (2013)	The Beyond / Where the Giants Roam (2015)	Drunk (2017)

Professional ratings
Aggregate scores
Source	Rating
Metacritic	81/100
Review scores
Source	Rating
Consequence	C+
Exclaim!	8/10
The Guardian	4/5 stars
NME	8/10
Pitchfork	8.3/10
Resident Advisor	4.2/5
Spin	7/10

The Beyond / Where the Giants Roam is an EP (Note: Exclaim! stated that it is an EP. Meanwhile, Clash stated that it is a mini-album.) by American musician Thundercat. It was released on June 22, 2015 via Brainfeeder.

== Background ==
In an interview with Billboard, Thundercat stated that the EP had been conceived while making Flying Lotus' You're Dead!, Kamasi Washington's The Epic, and Kendrick Lamar's To Pimp a Butterfly, stating that the four had shared creative ideas for each of their projects. The EP was revealed to be a prelude to Bruner's followup album, Drunk.

== Critical reception ==
At Metacritic, which assigns a weighted average score out of 100 to reviews from mainstream critics, the EP received an average score of 81% based on 9 reviews, indicating "universal acclaim".

It ranked at number 24 on Pitchfork's "50 Best Albums of 2015" list.

== Track listing ==
No.	Title	Producer(s)	Length
1.	"Hard Times"	Thundercat	1:13
2.	"Song for the Dead"	Mono/Poly; Thundercat	2:48
3.	"Them Changes"	Flying Lotus; Thundercat	3:08
4.	"Lone Wolf and Cub"	Flying Lotus; Mono/Poly; Thundercat	5:30
5.	"That Moment"	Flying Lotus; Thundercat	0:43
6.	"Where the Giants Roam/Field of the Nephilim"	Thundercat	2:46
Total length:			16:08

== Personnel ==
- Thundercat – vocals, bass, production
- Charles Dickerson (Mono/Poly) – production, keyboards, programming
- Steven Ellison (Flying Lotus) – production, keyboards, programming
- Miguel Atwood-Ferguson – strings on 2 and 4
- Dennis Hamm – keyboards on 3 and 6
- Kamasi Washington – saxophone on 3
- Herbie Hancock – keyboards on 4
- Taylor Graves – drum programing on 6
- Daddy Kev – mastering

== Charts ==
Chart	Peak position
US Heatseekers Albums	9
US Independent Albums	23
US Top R&B/Hip-Hop Albums	21

== See also ==
- Lone Wolf and Cub
