= Them Changes (Thundercat song) =

Single by Thundercat

from the EP The Beyond / Where the Giants Roam and album Drunk
- Released: June 18, 2015
- Genre: Funk; psychedelic jazz; pop; R&B
- Length: 3:07
- Label: Brainfeeder
- Songwriters: Stephen Lee Bruner; Steven Ellison; Chris Jasper; Ernie Isley; Marvin Isley; O'Kelly Isley; Ronald Isley; Rudolph Isley
- Producer: Thundercat • Flying Lotus

Thundercat singles chronology
"Oh Sheit It's X" (2013)	"Them Changes" (2015)	"Bus in These Streets" (2016)

"Them Changes" is a song by American musician Thundercat. It was first released on June 18, 2015, as a single from his EP The Beyond / Where the Giants Roam. The track, which Thundercat co-wrote with producer Flying Lotus, was later included on Thundercat's full-length album Drunk, released on February 24, 2017.

A funk and psychedelic jazz song with elements of pop and R&B, "Them Changes" features a sampled beat from the 1977 song "Footsteps in the Dark" by the Isley Brothers. "Them Changes" was accompanied by a music video directed by Carlos López Estrada. In October 2022, after a sped-up remix of the song went viral on TikTok, an official "Sped Up" version of the song was released on digital platforms.

== Personnel ==
- Stephen "Thundercat" Bruner – vocals, bass, programming
- Steven "Flying Lotus" Ellison – mixing, additional production, synthesizer, programming
- Kamasi Washington – saxophone
- Dennis Hamm – piano

== Charts ==
Weekly chart performance
Chart (2022)	Peak position
US Hot R&B Songs (Billboard)	19
