= Apocalypse (Thundercat album) =

Studio album by Thundercat
- Released: July 9, 2013
- Genres: Jazz fusion; electronic; funk; contemporary R&B
- Length: 39:59
- Label: Brainfeeder
- Producers: Flying Lotus; Stephen Bruner; Mono/Poly; Taylor Graves; Zack Sekoff

Thundercat chronology
The Golden Age of Apocalypse (2011)	Apocalypse (2013)	The Beyond / Where the Giants Roam (2015)

Singles from Apocalypse
- 1. "Heartbreaks + Setbacks" Released: April 16, 2013; 2. "Oh Sheit It's X" Released: May 7, 2013

Professional ratings
Aggregate scores
Source	Rating
AnyDecentMusic?	7.8/10
Metacritic	83/100
Review scores
Source	Rating
AllMusic	4.5/5 stars
The Guardian	4/5 stars
The Independent	4/5 stars
The Irish Times	3/5 stars
Mojo	4/5 stars
NME	7/10
Pitchfork	8.2/10
Q	4/5 stars
Rolling Stone	3.5/5 stars
Uncut	7/10

Apocalypse is the second studio album by American musician Thundercat. It was released in July 9, 2013 under the label Brainfeeder.

In February 2014, Thundercat released a double video on the MySpace website for the 10th and 11th tracks from the album, respectively titled "Evangelion" and "We'll Die", which were both directed by the photographer B+ (Brian Cross), who also shot the album art.

== Track listing ==
All tracks are written by Thundercat & Flying Lotus, except where noted. All tracks produced by Flying Lotus, except where noted.

No.	Title	Writer(s)	Length
1.	"Tenfold"		3:04
2.	"Heartbreaks + Setbacks" (co-produced with Mono/Poly)		3:23
3.	"The Life Aquatic"	Thundercat	2:36
4.	"Special Stage"		2:56
5.	"Tron Song"		2:34
6.	"Seven" (co-produced with Zack Sekoff)		2:16
7.	"Oh Sheit It's X" (co-produced with Mono/Poly)	Thundercat, Flying Lotus, Mono/Poly, Durand Furbee	3:47
8.	"Without You"	Thundercat	4:41
9.	"Lotus and the Jondy"		4:52
10.	"Evangelion"		2:20
11.	"We'll Die"		0:55
12.	"A Message for Austin/Praise the Lord/Enter the Void"		6:35
Total length:			39:59

Japan Bonus Track
No.	Title	Length
12.	"Daylight (Reprise)" (Reprise of "Daylight" from The Golden Age of Apocalypse)	2:25
13.	"A Message for Austin/Praise the Lord/Enter the Void"	6:35
Total length:		42:24

== Charts ==
Chart	Peak position
US Billboard 200	194
US Heatseekers Albums	2
US Independent Albums	29
US Top R&B/Hip-Hop Albums	22
