= Drunk (album) =

2017 studio album by Thundercat

Studio album by Thundercat
- Released: February 24, 2017
- Recorded: 2015–2016
- Genres: Funk; jazz; hip-hop; pop; psychedelia; R&B; soul
- Length: 51:24
- Label: Brainfeeder
- Producers: Flying Lotus; Sounwave; Thundercat

Thundercat chronology
The Beyond / Where the Giants Roam (2015)	Drunk (2017)	It Is What It Is (2020)

Singles from Drunk
- 1. "Them Changes" Released: June 18, 2015; 2. "Bus in These Streets" Released: August 24, 2016; 3. "Show You the Way" Released: January 25, 2017; 4. "Friend Zone" Released: February 15, 2017; 5. "Walk on By" Released: February 22, 2017

Drunk is the third studio album by American musician Thundercat, released on February 24, 2017, by Brainfeeder. It features guest appearances from Kenny Loggins, Michael McDonald, Kendrick Lamar, Wiz Khalifa, Mac Miller, Pharrell, Kamasi Washington and Louis Cole. It was released nearly four years after his previous studio album, Apocalypse.

Drunk incorporates a range of stylistic influences, including funk, hip-hop, jazz, pop, psychedelia, punk rock, R&B, soft rock, and soul. The album received positive reviews from music critics. A ChopNotSlop remix from OG Ron C, DJ Candlestick, and the Chopstars entitled Drank was released as a special edition purple vinyl record.

== Songs ==
=== Overview ===
Drunk has been described as incorporating the stylistic influences of funk, hip-hop, jazz, pop, psychedelia, punk rock, R&B, soft rock, and soul. Multiple reviewers noted jazz fusion influences in the album, and The Independent's Andy Gill wrote that the album "switch[es] abruptly between cool jazz, prog-fusion and sleek soul".

=== Discs one and two ===
The album's opening track, "Rabbot Ho", is one of several songs on the album that references alcohol, recreational drug use, and partying, and concludes with the lyric "Let's go hard, get drunk, and travel down a rabbit ho[le]". "Uh Uh" is a jazz-funk instrumental. "Bus in These Streets" makes reference to problematic smartphone use and disconnecting oneself from digital technology. "A Fan's Mail (Tron Song Suite II)", derives its title partly from Thundercat's pet cat Tron; its lyrics pertain to how Thundercat would prefer to be a cat than a celebrity, and features a chorus of repeating "meows".

"Lava Lamp" has been described by Thundercat as follows: "Feel like it's a never-ending tale. It is a lover. It is a person that loves you. There's love and love lost. That's what that is for me." Both "Lava Lamp" and "Show You the Way" have been characterized as "soft rock-tinted"; the latter song, which features vocal contributions from Michael McDonald and Kenny Loggins, has also been described as yacht rock. Thundercat said of "Show You the Way": "That song to me is about going down the rabbit hole, taking you to another place. It's me denoting, 'I can show you how to get to another place.' On the edge of dark, there's the brightest light. It means a lot to me in the sense of the experience that I've had growing up with friends and people that I've been around where it's inviting them into where I come from emotionally".

Regarding "Jethro", which has been characterized as "synthy R&B"—and by Thundercat himself as incorporating "a little bit of disco"—Thundercat stated: "That song feels closer to me talking about death than anything. It's the inevitable. I don't know. That was just my identification with it. That's literally all I can tell you about that song." "Walk on By" is a hip-hop duet between Thundercat and Kendrick Lamar that utilizes a drum machine. "Tokyo", which features references to the anime Dragon Ball Z, was influenced by Thundercat's love of anime and his experiences in the eponymous Japanese city. "Jameel's Space Ride" is named after Thundercat's younger brother Jameel Bruner, and contains lyrics alluding to police brutality "over a synthy Nintendo beat".

=== Discs three and four ===
"Friend Zone", named after the interpersonal relationship concept, contains references to the video game series Diablo and Mortal Kombat. "Them Changes"—a track first released on Thundercat's 2015 EP The Beyond / Where the Giants Roam—features a sampled beat from the 1977 song "Footsteps in the Dark" by the Isley Brothers. "Drink Dat" is a slow jam featuring rap verses by Wiz Khalifa; the song's lyrics explore the futility of alcohol and drug use as a means of escape from one's problems. Describing "Drink Dat", Thundercat said: "Wiz smokes, and I always had this theory that the smoker and the drinker find each other. He would trip out watching me drink sometimes and be like, 'Whoa.' He'd be like, 'Man, it's pretty crazy.' I was like, 'The way you smoke, that's just the way I drink.' It didn't scare him—it was definitely intense for him, though. It was like, 'Wow, there it is.' The smoker and the drinker personified, and I feel like that's that song."

"The Turn Down", featuring vocals by Pharrell, contains political and environmental themes, and was described by Thundercat as "the 'everything is terrible' song [...] It's very serious, but at the same time a bit joking." The tracks "Inferno", "I Am Crazy", and "3AM" are considered by Thundercat to be akin to a single composition: "I feel like those three songs are actually one song. Essentially, if you're listening to it straight through, there's a bit of a story to it. You can hear it. It's like, 'Am I going crazy?' And then it's 'three o'clock.' There's a part where I kind of really open up about how I feel about things. If you were listen to them again just consecutively, you can hear it a bit." The final track on the album, "DUI", concludes with the lyrics "One more glass to go / where this ends, we'll never know".

== Cover and packaging ==
Brainfeeder's Adam Stover designed the album cover and packaging for Drunk. The front cover image, photographed by filmmaker Eddie Alcazar, features Thundercat nose-deep in a pool of water, staring intensely. The image resembles that of the cover of Grover Washington Jr’s 1975 album Mister Magic, which also was viewed as a jazz-funk genre defining album of its era. Alcazar said of the shoot:

We first were going to shoot it in Flylo's bathtub. I had it all ready and filled up with bubbles and even set up moody lights and everything, but [Thundercat] couldn't fit. We moved the shoot to the pool outside, right when the sun was going down and that's when things just got really magically weird ... I was shooting film and my exposure had to be perfect so he had to hold his breath and be still for minutes at a time. That bubble you see by his nose represents the struggle.

Stover drew inspiration from vintage jazz and funk records in designing the album's front and back covers and layout; inspiration was also drawn from the soundtrack to the 1974 film Death Wish, composed by Herbie Hancock, as Thundercat wanted Drunk's visual design to be stylistically similar to that of the Hancock record. The album's title is set in the Cooper Black typeface, and its credits and track listings are set in Franklin Gothic.

== Critical reception ==
Professional ratings
Aggregate scores
Source	Rating
AnyDecentMusic?	7.9/10
Metacritic	80/100
Review scores
Source	Rating
AllMusic	3.5/5 stars
Chicago Tribune	3/4 stars
The Guardian	4/5 stars
The Independent	3/5 stars
The Irish Times	4/5 stars
Mojo	4/5 stars
NME	4/5 stars
The Observer	4/5 stars
Pitchfork	8.5/10
Q	4/5 stars

Drunk received general praise from music critics. On the review aggregator website Metacritic the album received an aggregate score of 80 based on 26 reviews indicating "generally favorable reviews". Aggregator AnyDecentMusic? gave it 7.9 out of 10, based on their assessment of the critical consensus.

In a strongly positive review for Exclaim!, Daniel Sylvester praised Thundercat's groove and ability to seemingly shift through song to song while changing a few things, but keeping that groove going well.

=== Accolades ===
Publication	Accolade	Rank	Ref.
BBC Radio 6 Music	Albums of the Year 2017	1	
Exclaim!	Top 10 Soul and R&B Albums of 2017	3	
The Guardian	The Best Albums of 2017	8	
Noisey	The 100 Best Albums of 2017	98	
NME	NME's Albums of the Year 2017	50	
Pitchfork	The 50 Best Albums of 2017	24	
Rough Trade	Albums of the Year 2017	9	
Stereogum	The 50 Best Albums of 2017	47	
Vinyl Me, Please	The 30 Best Albums of 2017	19	

== Track listing ==
No.	Title	Writer(s)	Length
1.	"Rabbot Ho"	Stephen Bruner; Dennis Hamm	0:38
2.	"Captain Stupido"	Bruner; Steven Ellison	1:41
3.	"Uh Uh"	Bruner; Zack Sekoff	2:16
4.	"Bus in These Streets"	Bruner; Louis Cole	2:24
5.	"A Fan's Mail (Tron Song Suite II)"	Bruner; Mark Spears	2:38
6.	"Lava Lamp"	Bruner; Spears	2:58
7.	"Jethro"	Bruner; Ellison	1:34
8.	"Day & Night"	Bruner; S. Burris	0:37
9.	"Show You the Way" (featuring Michael McDonald and Kenny Loggins)	Bruner; Michael McDonald; Kenny Loggins	3:34
10.	"Walk on By" (featuring Kendrick Lamar)	Bruner; Kendrick Duckworth	3:19
11.	"Blackkk"	Bruner; Spears	1:59
12.	"Tokyo"	Bruner; Hamm	2:24
13.	"Jameel's Space Ride"	Bruner; Cole	1:09
14.	"Friend Zone"	Bruner; Charles Dickerson	3:12
15.	"Them Changes"	Bruner; Ellison; Chris Jasper; Ernie Isley; Marvin Isley; O'Kelly Isley; Ronald Isley; Rudolph Isley	3:08
16.	"Where I'm Going"	Bruner; Ellison	2:09
17.	"Drink Dat" (featuring Wiz Khalifa)	Bruner; Cameron Thomaz; Taylor Graves	3:35
18.	"Inferno"	Bruner	4:00
19.	"I Am Crazy"	Bruner	0:25
20.	"3AM"	Bruner; Ellison	1:15
21.	"Drunk"	Bruner; Ellison	1:42
22.	"The Turn Down" (featuring Pharrell)	Bruner; Pharrell Williams	2:29
23.	"DUI"	Bruner; Hamm	2:18
Total length:			51:24

Japanese version bonus track
No.	Title	Writer(s)	Length
24.	"Hi" (featuring Mac Miller)	Bruner; Malcolm McCormick	3:01
Total length:			54:25

== Personnel ==
- Stephen "Thundercat" Bruner – vocals (all tracks), bass (all tracks), programming (tracks 10–12, 18, 19, 21, 22)
- Miguel Atwood-Ferguson – strings (tracks 18, 23)
- S. Burris – synth-bass (track 8)
- Zane Carney – guitar (track 2)
- Louis Cole – drums (tracks 4, 13), keyboards (tracks 4, 13), programming (tracks 4, 13), "basically everything" (track 13)
- Kevin "Daddy Kev" Moo – mastering
- Charles "Mono/Poly" Dickerson – keyboards (track 14), programming (track 14)
- Steven "Flying Lotus" Ellison – mixing, additional production (tracks 1–5, 7–10, 13, 15, 16, 18–23), synthesizer (track 15), programming (tracks 2, 7, 9, 15, 16, 18, 20, 21)
- Taylor Graves – keyboards (track 17), programming (track 17)
- Dennis Hamm – keyboards (tracks 1, 6, 7, 9, 11, 12, 18, 20, 23), piano (tracks 3, 15), synthesizers (track 6)
- Kendrick Lamar – vocals (track 10)
- Kenny Loggins – vocals (track 9)
- Michael McDonald – vocals (track 9), keyboards (track 9)
- Harry Rabin – engineer (track 9)
- Mac Miller – vocals (track 24)
- Deantoni Parks – drums (tracks 7, 16)
- Zack Sekoff – programming (track 3)
- Mark "Sounwave" Spears – production (tracks 5, 6, 11)
- Cameron "Wiz Khalifa" Thomaz – vocals (track 17)
- Kamasi Washington – saxophone (track 15)
- Pharrell Williams – vocals (track 22)

== Charts ==
Chart (2017)	Peak position
Australian Albums (ARIA)	58
Austrian Albums (Ö3 Austria)	72
Belgian Albums (Ultratop Flanders)	39
Canadian Albums (Billboard)	78
Dutch Albums (Album Top 100)	35
French Albums (SNEP)	153
German Albums (Offizielle Top 100)	63
New Zealand Heatseeker Albums (RMNZ)	3
Scottish Albums (Official Charts)	46
Swiss Albums (Schweizer Hitparade)	56
UK Albums (Official Charts)	37
US Billboard 200	50
