= Thundercat (musician) =

American musician and producer (born 1984)

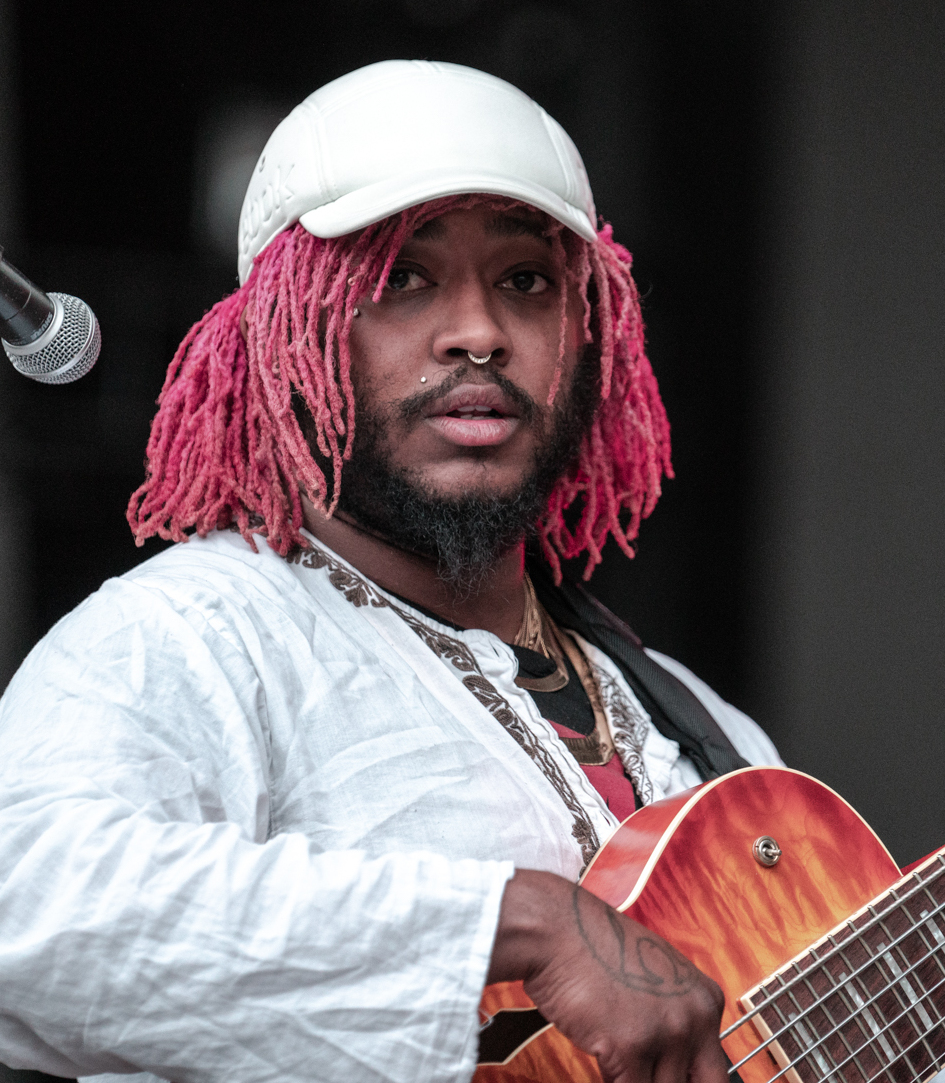
- Thundercat in 2018

Background information
- Born: Stephen Lee Bruner; October 19, 1984 (age 41); Los Angeles, California, U.S.
- Genres: Funk; progressive R&B; soul; electronica; acid jazz; psychedelia; crossover thrash; jazz fusion; astral jazz
- Occupations: Musician; producer; songwriter; singer
- Instruments: Bass guitar; vocals
- Works: Thundercat discography
- Years active: 2000–present
- Label: Brainfeeder
- Member of: West Coast Get Down
- Formerly of: Suicidal Tendencies
- Website: theamazingthundercat.com

Stephen Lee Bruner (born October 19, 1984), better known by his stage name Thundercat, is an American musician, singer, record producer, songwriter, and bassist from Los Angeles, California. First coming to prominence as a member of heavy metal band Suicidal Tendencies, he returned to his musical roots, placing a strong focus on funk, soul, progressive R&B, psychedelia and jazz-fusion. He has since released five solo studio albums and is noted for his work with producer Flying Lotus and his appearances on Kendrick Lamar's 2015 album To Pimp a Butterfly. In 2016, Thundercat won a Grammy for Best Rap/Sung Performance for his work on the track "These Walls" from To Pimp a Butterfly. In 2020, Thundercat released his fourth studio album, It Is What It Is, which earned him a Grammy Award for Best Progressive R&B Album. Rolling Stone has ranked him as one of the greatest bass players of all time.

== Early life ==
Raised in Compton and other parts of Los Angeles, Bruner was born into a family of musicians, including his father Ronald Bruner Sr., a drummer, and his mother Pam, a flautist and percussionist. His father played drums for the Temptations, the Supremes, and Gladys Knight, amongst others. After Bruner Sr. got sober from cocaine, the children would watch him play gigs at the Crenshaw Christian Center. Bruner attended Locke High School, playing in the school's jazz band. His teacher, Reggie Andrews, produced and co-wrote the Dazz Band's 1982 single "Let It Whip" and collaborated with Rick James. Andrews re-introduced Bruner to Kamasi Washington; the two had originally met as children, through their fathers' membership in a gospel fusion band. The reunited duo would sneak into jazz concerts, driving around in a worn-down 1982 Ford Mustang to do so. They would later get to play the same venues as the performers they watched. They also did sessions with Bruner's cousin Terrace Martin in Washington's father's garage during this time.

== Career ==
Bruner began playing the bass at an early age, listening to bass players such as Stanley Clarke and Marcus Miller for inspiration. By the age of 15, he had a minor hit in Germany as a member of the boy band No Curfew. A year later, he joined his brother Ronald Jr. as a member of the Los Angeles crossover thrash band Suicidal Tendencies, replacing former bass player Josh Paul. Bruner's earliest studio album appearances include playing electric bass on Kamasi Washington's Live at 5th Street Dick's and The Proclamation.

Erykah Badu was credited with helping Bruner find his stage presence and identity as Thundercat. Around this time, Bruner would play in live bands for Raphael Saadiq and Snoop Dogg, and both would make quips about his playing style. Bruner credited Flying Lotus with pushing him to start singing and making his own projects.

=== The Golden Age of Apocalypse and Apocalypse ===
He released his debut solo album in 2011, The Golden Age of Apocalypse, which featured production from Flying Lotus, and was influenced by 1970s fusion artists such as Stanley Clarke and George Duke, who his brother also later toured with. Thundercat's second album Apocalypse was released in 2013.

=== The Beyond / Where the Giants Roam ===
On June 22, 2015, Thundercat released The Beyond / Where the Giants Roam EP, which was developed during the production of To Pimp a Butterfly. The EP includes tributes to his friend and collaborator Austin Peralta, a jazz pianist who was signed to Brainfeeder before his death in 2012. The EP also includes a feature from Herbie Hancock and was the first appearance of "Them Changes".

In 2016, Bruner revealed to XXL that he was working on a new album with Flying Lotus as a main contributor. In May of that year, Bruner appeared live with Red Hot Chili Peppers to play additional bass on their song "Go Robot" at iHeartRadio's release party for the band's 2016 album The Getaway. In August 2016, Bruner appeared live with singers Kenny Loggins and Michael McDonald in Chicago.

=== Drunk ===
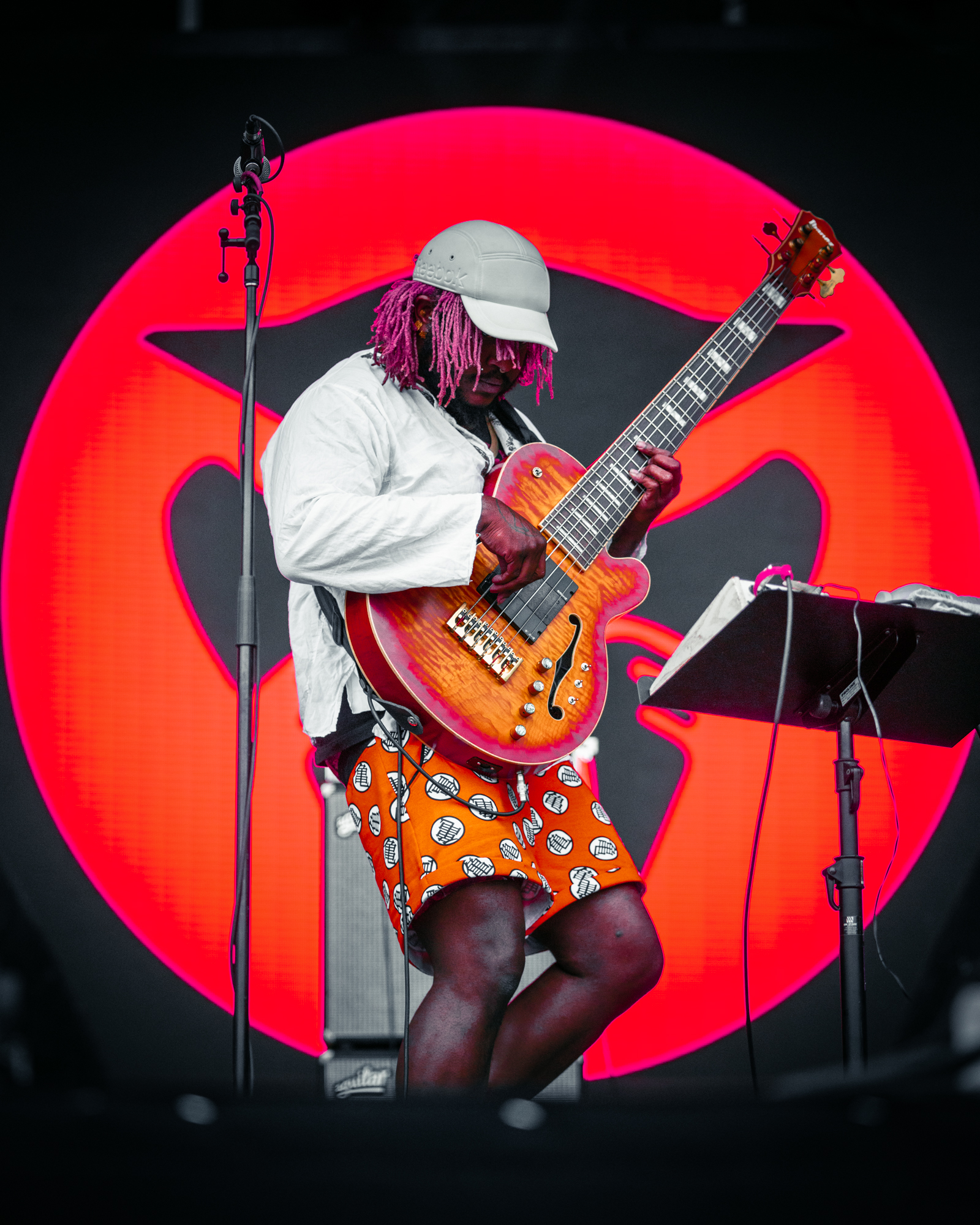
Thundercat performing in front of his logo in 2018

Thundercat released his third studio album, Drunk, on February 24, 2017. In June 2017, Thundercat appeared on The Tonight Show Starring Jimmy Fallon to promote his studio album Drunk with Michael McDonald and Kenny Loggins.

=== It Is What It Is ===
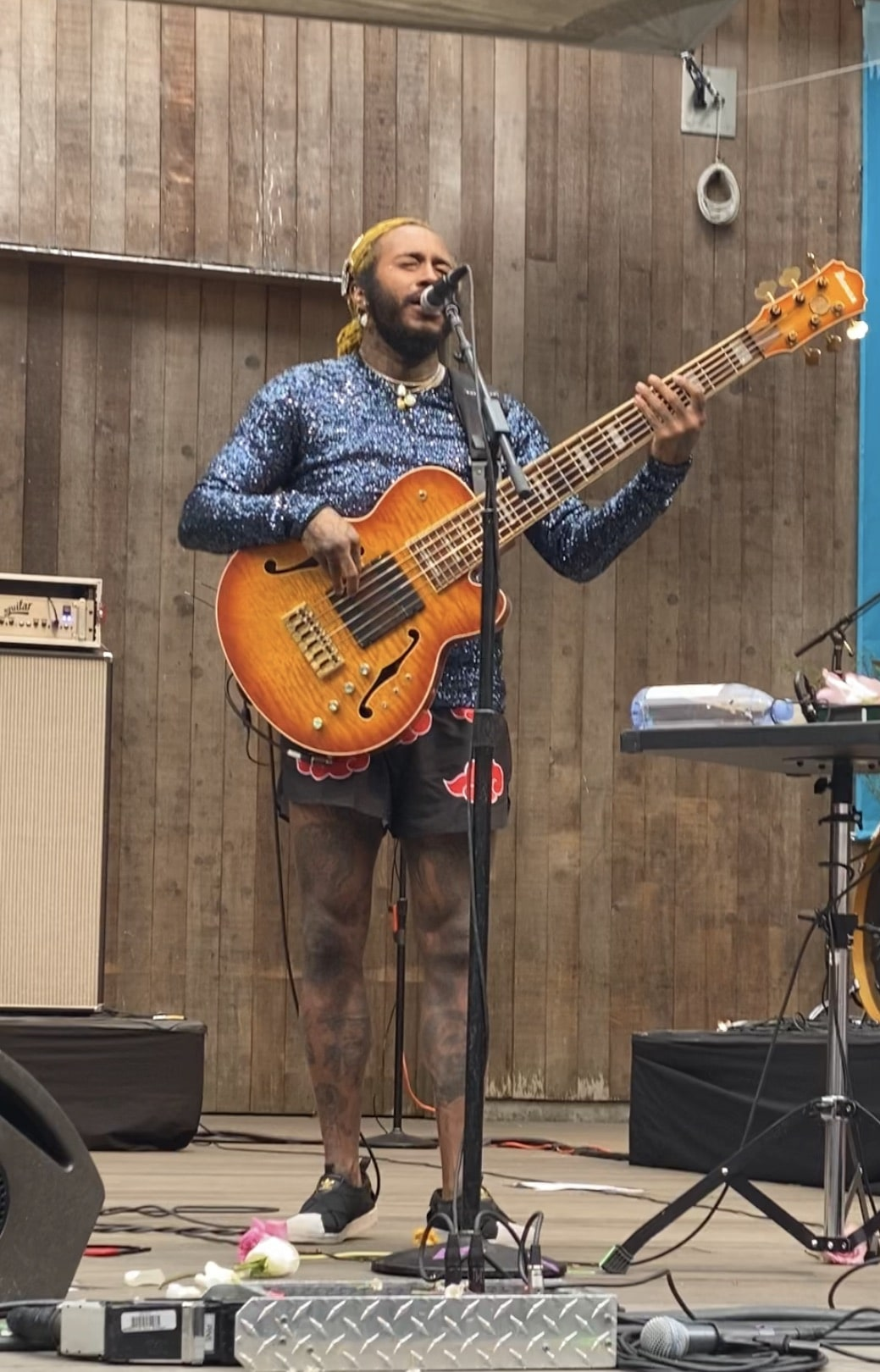
Thundercat performing at Stern Grove in San Francisco, 2021

In October 2018, Thundercat premiered the song "King of the Hill" from his then upcoming album It Is What It Is. The second single, "Black Qualls", featuring Steve Lacy, Steve Arrington, and Childish Gambino, was released on January 16, 2020. Another single, "Dragonball Durag", was released on February 17. It Is What It Is released on April 3, 2020, and was met with critical acclaim. Thundercat dedicated the album to friend and frequent collaborator Mac Miller. In 2020, It Is What It Is won Best Progressive R&B Album at the 63rd Annual Grammy Awards.

In 2021, he received the Libera Award for Best R&B Record 2021 for his album It Is What It Is (Brainfeeder Records) by the American Association of Independent Music (A2IM). The album was also nominated as Record of the Year, but lost to Phoebe Bridgers' album Punisher.

In 2022, he made a guest appearance in the fourth episode of The Book of Boba Fett as a "Mod Artist" who Boba Fett enlists to save Fennec Shand's life in a flashback where he replaced her damaged parts with cybernetic replacements.

In April 2023, he released a new single collaborating with Kevin Parker/Tame Impala, "No More Lies". Following the release of "No More Lies", Thundercat announced the In Yo Girl’s City Tour, to begin on August 5, 2023, in Newport, Rhode Island and conclude on November 14, 2023, in Santiago, Chile.

=== Distracted ===
On September 15, 2025, Thundercat released the singles "I Wish I Didn't Waste Your Time" and "Children of the Baked Potato"; the latter song featured Remi Wolf.

On January 29, 2026, Thundercat released the track "I Did This To Myself", featuring Lil Yachty, as a single from his then upcoming fifth studio album, Distracted. On February 17, Thundercat released another single featuring Mac Miller named "She Knows Too Much". The album was released on April 3, 2026 through Brainfeeder, and was mainly produced by Greg Kurstin with additional credits from Flying Lotus, Kenny Beats and The Lemon Twigs. It features guest appearances from Tame Impala, A$AP Rocky, Channel Tres and Willow Smith, as well as a posthumous feature by Mac Miller.

He is scheduled to headline We Out Here Festival in the UK in August 2026, and to embark on the North American "Distracted AF Tour" in support of the album, beginning on October 2, 2026 in Miami and concluding on December 11, 2026 in Austin. Channel Tres, TiaCorine, Fera, 54 Ultra, and Kitty Ca$h will open over various dates.

=== Collaborations ===
In 2004, Bruner collaborated with Kamasi Washington, as well as Cameron Graves and Ronald Bruner Jr., under the name The Young Jazz Giants. The group later united with Terrace Martin and five other Los Angeles jazz musicians to form the West Coast Get Down collective, with whom they recorded several albums.

Along with his band duties, Bruner is also a session musician, acclaimed for his work on Erykah Badu's New Amerykah (2008) and fellow Brainfeeder artist Flying Lotus' Cosmogramma (2010), Until the Quiet Comes (2012), and You're Dead! (2014).

Bruner was a major contributor to Kendrick Lamar's critically acclaimed album To Pimp a Butterfly in 2015, and has been described as being "at the creative epicenter" of the project. Longtime Thundercat collaborators Flying Lotus, Kamasi Washington, and Terrace Martin were also major contributors to the album.

Bruner was a frequent collaborator on Mac Miller's tracks. On August 6, 2018, Bruner played bass during Miller's Tiny Desk Concert, during which the two played their collaborative track "What's the Use?"

In 2022, he collaborated with virtual band Gorillaz on their single "Cracker Island", the first single and title track for their album of the same name. The song was released on April 30, 2022.

In April 2024, he collaborated with Justice on the track "The End", the last track on their album Hyperdrama. The album was released on 26 April 2024. The song was featured at the Summer Olympics 2024 closing ceremony in Paris. In August 2024, he was featured in an episode of children's show Yo Gabba Gabba!, performing "Orange Cat" with the show's cast, while in a cat costume. He would reunite with the cast in December 2024, to perform a medley of songs as a part of the Tiny Desk Concert series. He also appeared with the cast during their 2025 Coachella set alongside Flavor Flav, "Weird Al" Yankovic, Portugal. The Man, DJ Lance Rock and Paul Williams.

In 2025, Bruner made a special guest appearances in Spinal Tap’s performance of "Big Bottom" on Jimmy Kimmel Live!, alongside fellow bass virtuoso Tal Wilkenfeld. In January 2026, Bruner collaborated with A$AP Rocky, providing vocals to his song "Playa" on the album Don't Be Dumb. He also made a cameo during Rocky's Saturday Night Live performance of "Punk Rocky", intentionally miming the song's bass parts alongside "drummer" Danny Elfman. Rocky would later feature on the song "Funny Friends", from Thundercat's own album Distracted.

== Personal life ==
He has a daughter named Sanaa.

Other members of Stephen's musician family include Stephen's youngest brother, Jameel Bruner who was a keyboardist in Odd Future's neo-soul/jazz group The Internet on their 2015 album Ego Death alongside guitarist Steve Lacy, who was making his debut at that time.

Bruner was a close friend of the rapper Mac Miller, and the two often spent time together in their personal lives. Miller's death in 2018 made Bruner confront his own substance use and alcoholism, causing him to drink less and adopt better eating habits, including becoming vegan. "It's sex, drugs and rock'n'roll. It's real. You ride the line, you don't know how close you are sometimes. Do I think he meant to die? No, I don't think he did. Even though that sometimes creeps in there because you're always on the edge of a knife. Sometimes you mess up. That happens a lot," Bruner shared in a 2020 interview with The Guardian.

Bruner is a big fan of anime and cartoons, and often wears outfits and accessories that reflect this, such as a Pikachu backpack, cat-ear headbands, and the Interface Headset from the anime Neon Genesis Evangelion. His stage name, taken from the 1985 cartoon series Thundercats, is further evidence of these influences. Bruner is a Christian, and incorporates many of the religion's themes in his music.

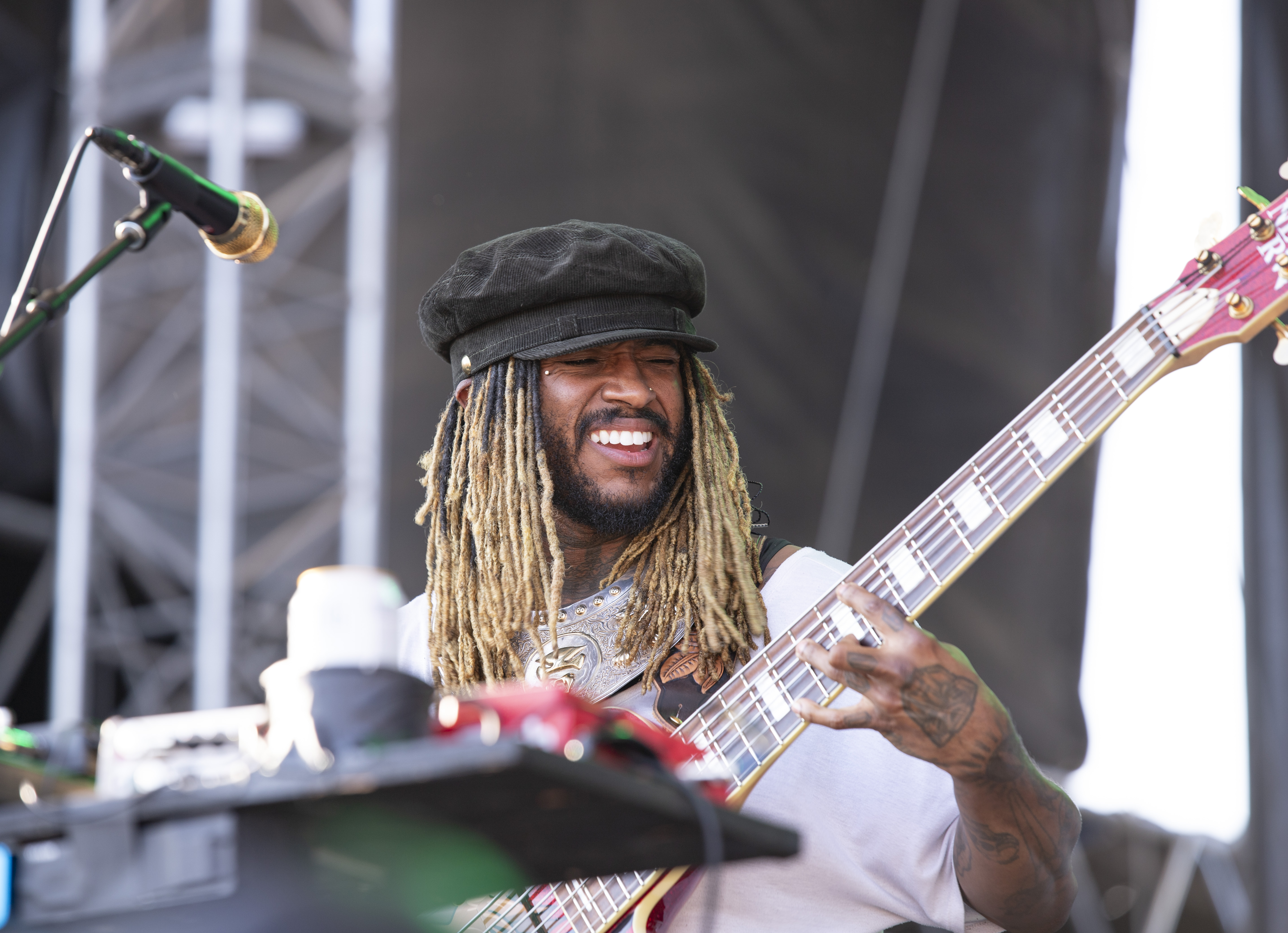
Thundercat in 2025

== Instruments ==
Bruner is most often seen playing his six-string Ibanez Custom Shop model bass (tuned to BEADGC); it has a hollowed-out maple body, five-piece maple/jatoba neck, and rosewood fingerboard. It utilizes EMG magnetic pickups, Graph Tech Ghost piezo saddles, and a MIDI-capable in/out.

Ibanez produced a Thundercat signature model bass known as the TCB1006, with six strings.

== Discography ==
- The Golden Age of Apocalypse (2011)
- Apocalypse (2013)
- Drunk (2017)
- It Is What It Is (2020)
- Distracted (2026)

== Filmography ==
Year	Title	Role	Notes
2022	The Book of Boba Fett	Mod Artist	Episodes 4, 7
2024	Yo Gabba Gabbaland	Himself	Episode: Outside
2026	Saturday Night Live	Himself	Episode: Finn Wolfhard / ASAP Rocky
2026	Um, Actually	Himself	Episode: Zig, Garrick, and Thundercat Weeb Out

== Awards and nominations ==
Organization	Year	Award	Work	Result	Ref.
Berlin Music Video Awards	2026	Best Animation	"She Knows Too Much (feat. Mac Miller)"	Nominated	
Grammy Awards	2016	Album of the Year	To Pimp a Butterfly (as featured artist and producer)	Nominated	
Grammy Awards	2016	Best Rap/Sung Performance	"These Walls"	Won	
Grammy Awards	2021	Best Progressive R&B Album	It Is What It Is	Won	
Libera Awards	2016	Heritage Album of the Year	The Beyond / Where the Giants Roam	Nominated	
Libera Awards	2017	Album of the Year	Drunk	Nominated	
Libera Awards	2017	Best Blues/Jazz/R&B Album	Drunk	Nominated	
Libera Awards	2017	Creative Packaging	Drunk	Won	
Libera Awards	2021	Record of the Year	It Is What It Is	Nominated	
Libera Awards	2021	Best R&B Record	It Is What It Is	Won	
