= Ryan Porter =

American jazz trombonist (1979–2026)

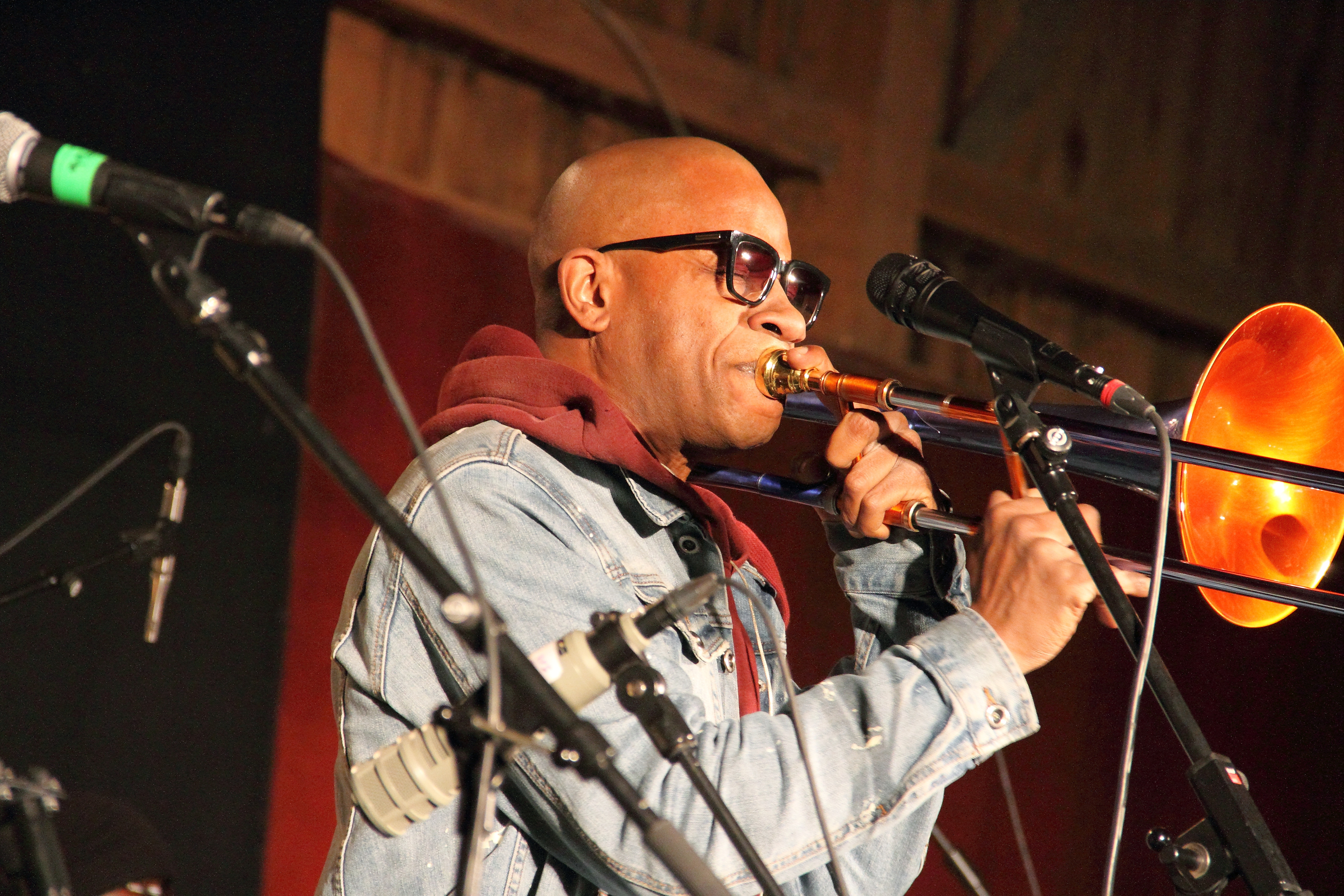
- Porter performing in 2018

Background information
- Born: July 31, 1979; Los Angeles, California, U.S.
- Died: May 16, 2026 (aged 46)
- Genres: Jazz; funk; R&B; hip-hop
- Occupations: Musician; composer
- Instrument: Trombone
- Years active: 2001–2026
- Formerly of: West Coast Get Down
- Website: www.ryanporterofficial.com

Ryan Porter (July 31, 1979 – May 16, 2026) was an American jazz trombonist. Based in Los Angeles, he was a founding member of the West Coast Get Down jazz collective. A longtime collaborator of West Coast Get Down saxophonist Kamasi Washington, he also toured with Stevie Wonder, Rihanna, Kanye West, Snoop Dogg, Lauryn Hill, and Nick Cave and the Bad Seeds.

== Early life ==
Ryan Porter was born in Los Angeles, California, on July 31, 1979. He was introduced to jazz by his grandfather, who had a large jazz record collection. He was first drawn to the trombone after seeing the cover of J. J. Johnson's album Proof Positive.

In high school, he was a member of the Multi-School Jazz Band in Watts under the direction of Reggie Andrews, in which he played alongside Kamasi Washington, Terrace Martin, Stephen "Thundercat" Bruner, and Ronald Bruner Jr., who would later be his bandmates in the West Coast Get Down. He participated in the inaugural Vail Jazz Workshop in 1996, where he met trumpeter Roy Hargrove. From 1997 to 2001, he attended the Manhattan School of Music, where he studied under jazz trombonists Steve Turre and David Taylor.

== Career ==
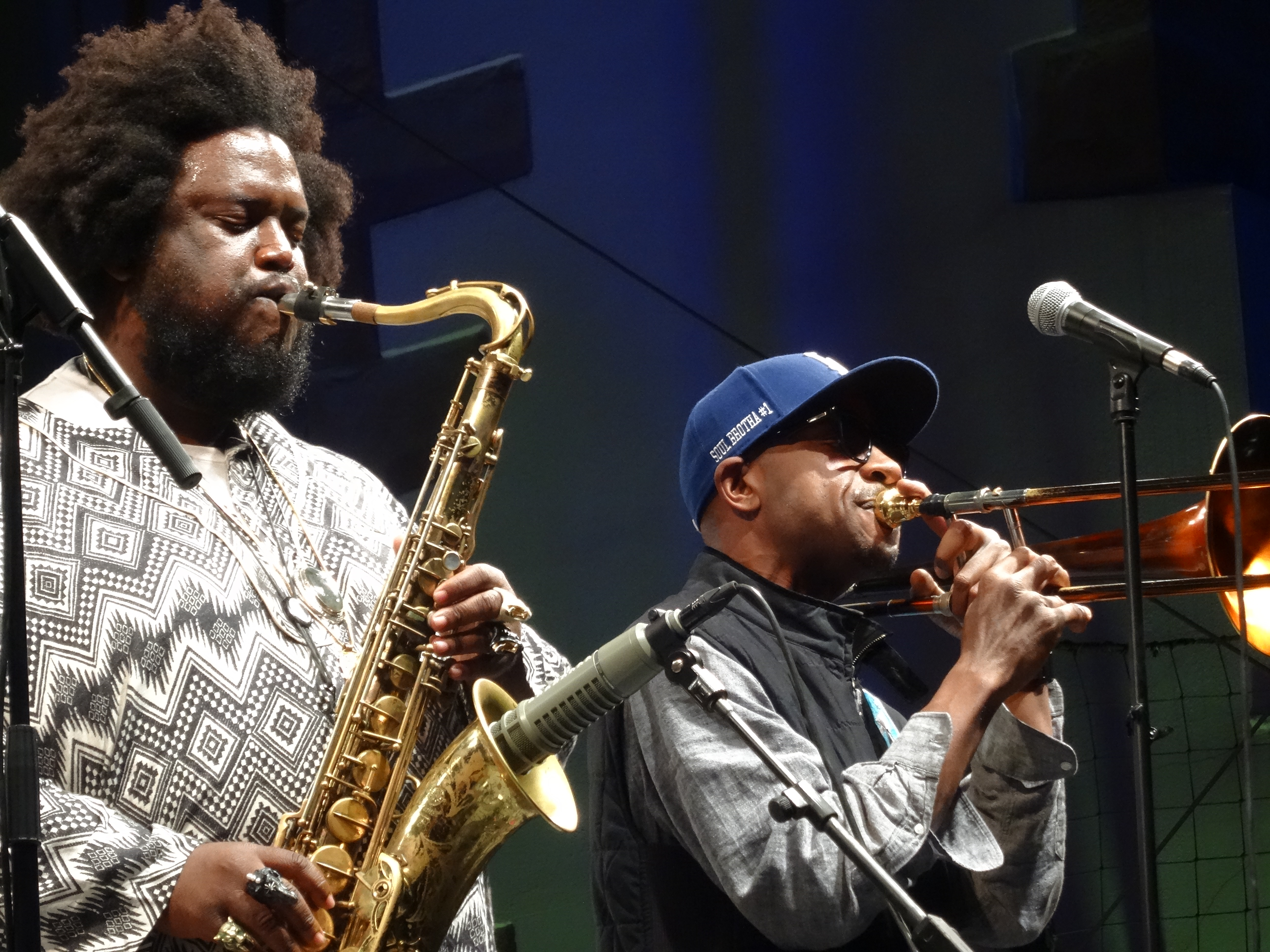
Porter performing with Kamasi Washington at San Sebastian Jazz Festival in 2017

Between 2008 and 2009, Porter and his West Coast Get Down bandmates held a series of recording sessions in Kamasi Washington's parents' garage, which they called "the Shack." These sessions were cramped, overheated, and frequently interrupted by planes at the nearby Los Angeles International Airport landing strip. The recordings were released a decade later on Porter's album The Optimist (2018), whose title was inspired by Porter's optimism for the newly elected president Barack Obama at the time of recording. The album was released on World Galaxy and Alpha Pup Records.

In December 2011, Porter participated in the West Coast Get Down's Kingsize Soundlabs sessions, where the collective spent 30 straight days recording songs for seven different albums including Washington's The Epic (2015). Porter led a portion of these sessions, yielding the tracks on his debut album Spangle-Lang Lane (2017), a collection of reimagined children's songs reimagined in a soulful jazz and hip-hop style. With the album, he released a series of videos depicting puppet versions of the West Coast Get Down and other jazz musicians.

In June 2019, Porter released his third album Force for Good, which was recorded over the course of five years and also features Kamasi Washington.

== Death ==
Porter was injured in a traffic collision in late April 2026. He died from complications of the injuries he sustained on May 16, at the age of 46.

== Discography ==
Adapted from AllMusic.

=== Studio albums ===
- Spangle-Lang Lane (2017)
- The Optimist (2018)
- Force for Good (2019)
- Resilience (2022)

=== Live albums ===
- Ryan Porter (2020) (with the West Coast Get Down)

=== With Kamasi Washington ===
- The Epic (2015)
- Harmony of Difference (2017)
- Heaven and Earth (2018)
- Becoming (2020)
- Fearless Movement (2024)
