= Fearless Movement (album) =

Studio album by Kamasi Washington
- Released: May 3, 2024
- Recorded: Sunset; Gold Diggers; Larrabee; Henson; Kingsize; Woody Alpanalp; Digital-T; Electric Garden
- Length: 86:16
- Label: Young
- Producers: André 3000; Tony Austin; BJ the Chicago Kid; Ronald Bruner Jr.; George Clinton; Brandon Coleman; D Smoke; Cameron Graves; Terrace Martin; Ryan Porter; Kamasi Washington

Kamasi Washington chronology
Final Floor (2021)	Fearless Movement (2024)	Whatchu Bringing? (2026)

Singles from Fearless Movement
- 1. "Prologue" Released: March 6, 2024

Fearless Movement is the fifth studio album by American jazz saxophonist Kamasi Washington. It was released on May 3, 2024, through Young. Fearless Movement showcases members of Washington's collective West Coast Get Down like Thundercat, Patrice Quinn, Brandon Coleman, and Terrace Martin. It also features contributions from Taj Austin, Ras Austin, DJ Battlecat, George Clinton, D Smoke, André 3000, and BJ the Chicago Kid. The album runs for nearly one and a half hours.

== Background ==
Washington refers to Fearless Movement as his "dance album", though not in the literal sense. He views "dance" as "movement and expression" and "expressing your spirit through your body", equivalent to music itself. The album focuses "on the earthly", which marks a "creative pivot" in his career. The saxophonist drew inspiration from his newfound fatherhood, while his daughter even contributed to one song. Washington shared the closing track "Prologue" alongside the album announcement on March 6, 2024.

== Critical reception ==
Professional ratings
Aggregate scores
Source	Rating
AnyDecentMusic?	8.1/10
Metacritic	82/100
Review scores
Source	Rating
AllMusic	4/5 stars
The Line of Best Fit	8/10
Mojo	4/5 stars
NME	4/5 stars
The Observer	4/5 stars
Pitchfork	6.9/10
PopMatters	8/10
The Skinny	5/5 stars
Spin	A
Under the Radar	8.5/10

Fearless Movement was met with universal acclaim from music critics. At Metacritic, which assigns a normalized rating out of 100 to reviews from mainstream publications, the album received an average score of 82, based on sixteen reviews. The aggregator AnyDecentMusic? has the critical consensus of the album at an 8.1 out of 10, based on seventeen reviews.

Evan Haga of Spin found the album "bolsters Washington's prowess as a jazz bandleader engaged in cultural and musical curation. Rather than transforming the actual language of composition or harmony or improvisation, he stacks his influences and relationships to form an ensemble sound that is monumental, and thoroughly his own. In or out of jazz, that means so much". Liam Casci of The Skinny praised the album, saying "on this latest opus, Washington and company are a tightened-drum of an ensemble that effortlessly flit between an intense focus and a playful freedom, and the results are stunning".

Kyle Kersey of Under the Radar stated: "with Fearless Movement, his third great record in a row, Washington once again demonstrates his commitment to innovation, cementing his place in the great jazz canon. He's reigned in the runtime, but the ambitions remain". AllMusic's Thom Jurek wrote that Washington "doesn't merely juxtapose instruments and sounds, he painstakingly combines them, bringing joy, intensity, political, social, and spiritual poignancy in a vision at once focused, restless, and playful". Grayson Haver Currin of Mojo resumed: "on these dozen tracks, Washington creates a playground and invites friends in to be themselves, shaping a dizzying crosshatch of ideas where George Clinton's lounge croon sets up a trumpet-chased pep talk from rapper D Smoke, or André 3000 slips – with flutes in hand – into a nocturnal haze that feels like some futuristic Debussy state of bliss". Joe Goggins of NME stated: "Fearless Movement feels like more of a personal piece than Heaven and Earth, leaning more towards humanism than the spiritualism that has so enraptured Washington in the past. The key to his appeal, though, remains unchanged; he makes music that's apparently limitless in scope and yet joyously immediate, even to the casual jazz listener". Peter Thomas Webb of PopMatters concluded: "with a running time of 86 minutes, Fearless Movement demands commitment from the listener through its stylistic twists and turns. The first half, emphasizing vocals and choral hooks, is likely more accessible to general listeners than the second half. But fans of contemporary jazz will find plenty to enjoy throughout". Janne Oinonen of The Line of Best Fit found the artist "stretches out to fresh territory" on the album. Kitty Empire of The Observer wrote: "bereavements and recent fatherhood have led Washington to ponder mortality. But there is little dread in these 12 rich and versatile tracks, which touch sensually on Zapp's "Computer Love" and examine the "Road to Self" via a 13-minute workout".

Andy Cush of Pitchfork wrote: "Fearless Movement's first half is filled with guest vocalists delivering songs that attempt awkwardly to be soundtracks for both revelry and deep contemplation. The album gets better when it dispenses with its noncommittal relationship to party music, freeing Washington to pursue the heroic high drama that's still his strong suit".

=== Year-end lists ===
Select year-end rankings for Fearless Movement
Publication/critic	Accolade	Rank	Ref.
MOJO	The Best Albums Of 2024	44	
Rough Trade UK	Albums of the Year 2024	100	
Uncut	80 Best Albums of 2024	62	

== Track listing ==
Fearless Movement track listing
No.	Title	Lyrics	Music	Producer(s)	Length
1.	"Lesanu"	Kamasi Washington	K. Washington	K. Washington	9:22
2.	"Asha the First" (featuring Thundercat, Taj Austin, and Ras Austin)	K. Washington; Ras Austin; Taj Austin	K. Washington; Akili Asha Washington	K. Washington	7:46
3.	"Computer Love" (featuring Patrice Quinn, DJ Battlecat, and Brandon Coleman)	Shirley Murdock; Larry Troutman; Roger Troutman	Murdock; L. Troutman; R. Troutman	K. Washington	9:26
4.	"The Visionary" (featuring Terrace Martin)		K. Washington; Brandon Coleman; Cameron Graves; Terrace Martin	K. Washington; Coleman; Graves; Martin	1:10
5.	"Get Lit" (featuring George Clinton and D Smoke)	George Clinton; D Smoke	K. Washington; Ronald Bruner Jr.; Clinton; D Smoke	K. Washington; Bruner; Clinton; D Smoke	3:26
6.	"Dream State" (featuring André 3000)		K. Washington; André 3000; Tony Austin; Coleman	K. Washington; André 3000; Austin; Coleman	8:39
7.	"Together" (featuring BJ the Chicago Kid)	K. Washington; BJ the Chicago Kid	Ryan Porter	K. Washington; BJ the Chicago Kid; Porter	5:34
8.	"The Garden Path"		K. Washington	K. Washington	6:40
9.	"Interstellar Peace (The Last Stance)"		Coleman	K. Washington; Coleman	5:04
10.	"Road to Self (KO)"		K. Washington	K. Washington	13:25
11.	"Lines in the Sand"		K. Washington	K. Washington	7:26
12.	"Prologue"		Astor Piazzolla	K. Washington; Miles Mosley	8:19
Total length:					86:16

== Personnel ==
Musicians

- Kamasi Washington – tenor saxophone, arrangement (all tracks); alto saxophone (track 6)
- Brandon Coleman – keyboards, organ (all tracks); key bass (tracks 4, 6, 7), vocoder (3), arrangement (tracks 4, 6, 9)
- Cameron Graves – piano (tracks 1–4, 7–12), arrangement (track 4)
- Dontae Winslow – trumpet (tracks 1–3, 5, 7–12)
- Ronald Bruner Jr. – drums (tracks 1, 2, 5, 7–12), arrangement (track 5)
- Ryan Porter – trombone (tracks 1–3, 5, 7–12), arrangement (track 7)
- Tony Austin – drums (tracks 1–3, 6–12), arrangement (track 6)
- Allakoi Peete – percussion (tracks 1–3, 7–12)
- Kahlil Cummings – percussion (tracks 1–3, 7–12)
- Miles Mosley – double bass (tracks 1, 3, 8, 10–12), arrangement (track 12)
- Patrice Quinn – vocals (tracks 1–3, 8, 11)
- Woody Aplanalp – guitar (tracks 1, 3, 10)
- Carlos Niño – percussion (track 1)
- Banchamlak Abegase – vocals (track 1)
- Henok Elias – vocals (track 1)
- Stephen "Thundercat" Bruner – electric bass (tracks 2, 5)
- DJ Battlecat – turntables (track 2), talk box (3)
- Taj Austin – vocals (track 2)
- Ras Austin – vocals (track 2)
- Terrace Martin – alto saxophone, arrangement (track 4)
- Rickey Washington – flute (tracks 5, 8, 11)
- George Clinton – vocals, arrangement (track 5)
- D Smoke – vocals, arrangement (track 5)
- Joel Whitley – guitar (track 5)
- Robert Miller – drums (track 3)
- André 3000 – flutes, arrangement (track 6)
- Mono/Poly – synthesizer (track 6)
- Ben Williams – upright bass (track 9)
- Dwight Trible – vocals (tracks 8, 11)
- BJ the Chicago Kid – vocals, arrangement (track 7)

Technical

- Alex DeTurk – mastering
- Russell Elevado – mixing
- Tony Austin – lead engineering
- Tony Shepherd – additional engineering
- Clint Welander – engineering assistance
- Zack Zajdel – engineering assistance
- Nate Haessly – engineering assistance
- Chris Pegram – engineering assistance
- Brad Ritchie – engineering assistance
- Ryan Molder – engineering assistance
- Jacob Johnston – engineering assistance
- Anderson Kendig – engineering assistance
- Abbey Lewis – mixing assistance

Visuals

- B+ – album photography
- Sol Washington – photo editing
- Amani Washington – album painting
- Kerynn Washington – album fashion design
- Ramiro Perez – album fashion design
- Jake Simmonds – graphic design

== Charts ==
Chart performance for Fearless Movement
Chart (2024)	Peak position
Australian Jazz & Blues Albums (ARIA)	2
Australian Vinyl Albums (ARIA)	12
Austrian Albums (Ö3 Austria)	27
Belgian Albums (Ultratop Flanders)	50
Belgian Albums (Ultratop Wallonia)	66
French Albums (SNEP)	167
German Albums (Offizielle Top 100)	18
Japanese Albums (Oricon)	28
Japanese Hot Albums (Billboard Japan)	40
Scottish Albums (Official Charts)	12
Swiss Albums (Schweizer Hitparade)	29
UK Albums (Official Charts)	95
UK Independent Albums (Official Charts)	6
UK Jazz & Blues Albums (Official Charts)	1
