= West Coast Get Down =

American jazz collective

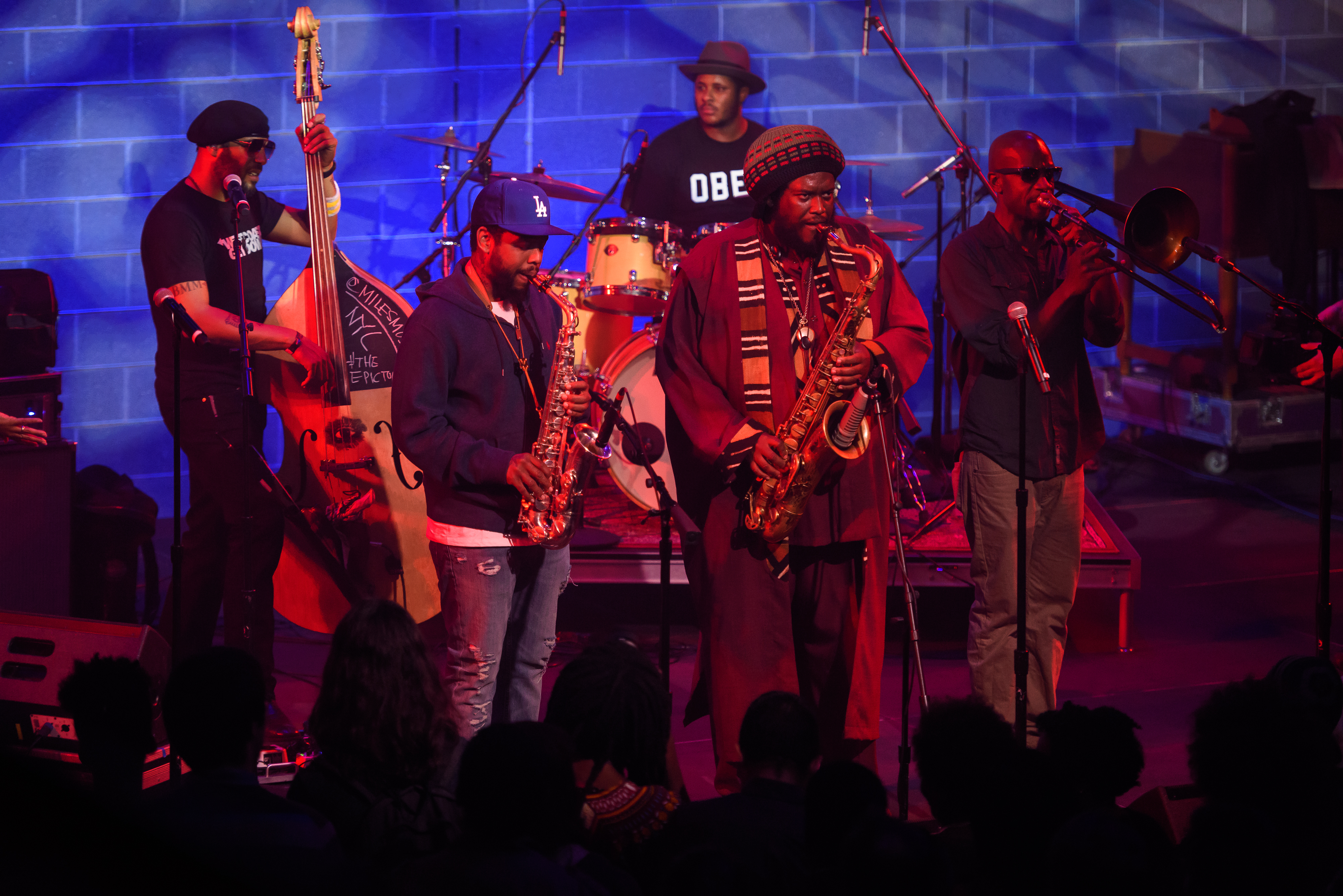
- From left: Miles Mosley, Terrace Martin, Ronald Bruner Jr., Kamasi Washington, and Ryan Porter, performing at BRIC JazzFest in Brooklyn in 2015

Background information
- Origin: Los Angeles, California
- Genres: Jazz; hip hop; funk
- Years active: 2009–present
- Members: Miles Mosley; Kamasi Washington; Terrace Martin; Ryan Porter; Stephen "Thundercat" Bruner; Ronald Bruner Jr.; Tony Austin; Cameron Graves; Brandon Coleman; Patrice Quinn

The West Coast Get Down is an American jazz collective formed in Los Angeles in 2006. Its members include saxophonist Kamasi Washington, bassists Miles Mosley and Stephen "Thundercat" Bruner, drummers Ronald Bruner Jr. and Tony Austin, pianists Cameron Graves and Brandon Coleman, trombonist Ryan Porter, and multi-instrumentalist Terrace Martin. Most of the members of the group gained prominence for their contributions to Kendrick Lamar's critically acclaimed album To Pimp a Butterfly (2015).

Described as the "Wu-Tang Clan of jazz," the collective has been hailed for "revitalizing jazz for younger audiences."

== History ==
=== 1993–2009: Origins ===
Each member of the collective grew up in Los Angeles County. Though they attended different high schools, they were first brought together in 1993 thanks to Locke High School music educator Reggie Andrews, who led an extracurricular music ensemble in Watts called the Multi-School Jazz Band; and Barbara Sealy and Robert Brodhead, who raised funds for Andrews after-school programs through the Thelonious Monk Institute of Jazz. Members of this band include Kamasi Washington (saxophone), brothers Stephen Bruner (bass) and Ronald Bruner Jr. (drums), Miles Mosley (bass), Tony Austin (drums), Brandon Coleman (keyboard), Cameron Graves (piano), and Ryan Porter (trombone).

As high schoolers, the group held some of their jam sessions in Washington's garage studio, affectionately dubbed "the Shack." and at after-school programs and gigs around the City of LA, procured and produced by Andrews and Sealy. The larger group began performing at jazz clubs throughout Los Angeles after graduation, including at the World Stage, an African-American arts space in Leimert Park founded by jazz drummer Billy Higgins, and at the coffee shop 5th Street Dick's.

The group, occasionally joined by vocalist Patrice Quinn, also had a residency at the Piano Bar, a Hollywood bar venue that became the group's home after Mosley created a space for them to perform when they were back off the road from their various tours. In 2008, Mosley led the twice-weekly performing residency at the Piano Bar that would last eight years until the space closed in 2016. The West Coast Get Down collective was officially established at the Piano Bar in 2009, with Mosley as its founder.

=== 2010–2015: Later collaborations ===
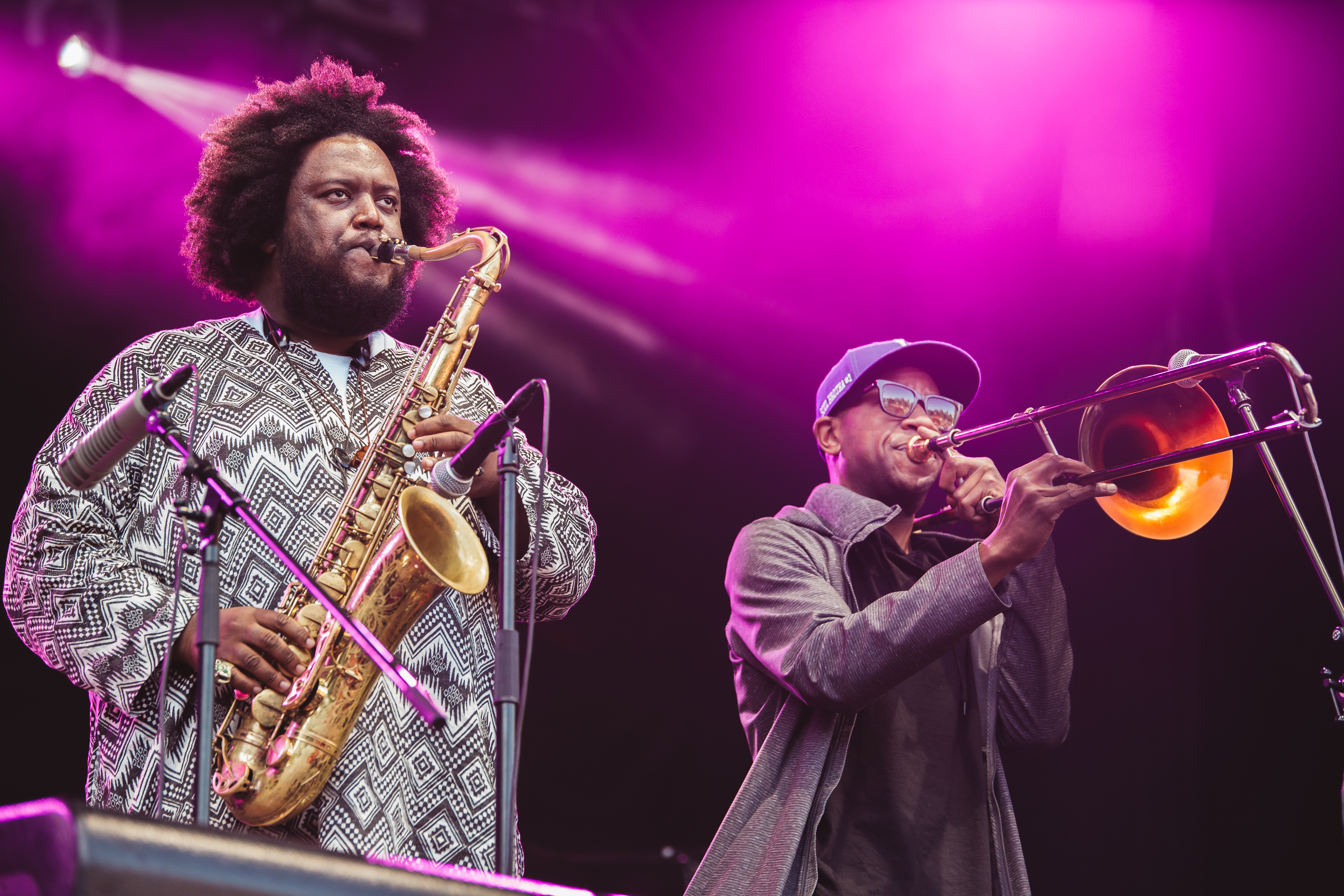
Kamasi Washington and Ryan Porter performing at San Sebastian Jazz Festival in 2017

In December 2011, the West Coast Get Down rented studio space at Kingsize Soundlabs in Echo Park, where they recorded for 30 straight days from 9 a.m. to 2 a.m., sometimes sleeping in the studio, in what came to be known as the "KSL Sessions." With Tony Austin doubling as the studio engineer, they recorded around 190 songs, many of which later appeared on albums including Washington's Brainfeeder release The Epic (2015), Mosley's Uprising (2017), Ronald Bruner's Triumph (2017), Graves's Planetary Prince (2017), Coleman's Resistance (2018), and Mosley and Austin's joint project BFI (2014). While productive, these sessions were taxing for the musicians, with Mosley recounting, "It was, creatively, the most freeing thing I've ever been a part of, but as a human being, it was really hard." Porter has said, "Those sessions are a blur, honestly, but I just remember us approaching that music so cinematically."

In 2013, rapper Kendrick Lamar, who had been friends with Terrace Martin since 2005, enlisted Martin to work on his upcoming album To Pimp a Butterfly. Martin later tapped Washington to provide string arrangements and saxophone parts. Miles Mosley and Ronald Bruner Jr. also participated in the album's recording sessions. To Pimp a Butterfly was released in 2015 to widespread critical acclaim, garnering 11 nominations and five wins at the 58th Grammy Awards. It is regarded as one of the greatest hip hop albums of all time.

=== 2016–present: After To Pimp a Butterfly ===
Before the Piano Bar closed in 2016, the West Coast Get Down played one of the venue's closing performances, a "secret show" with little advertisement. Members of the group have since pursued their own projects and tours, often alongside some subset of the collective. Members of the group were featured in the final episode of Homeland in 2020. Regarding the future of the collective, Ronald Bruner Jr. said in 2020, "Being in this band is a gig forever. I could be 90 and Kamasi will still call me!" Washington said the group has discussed creating an album under the West Coast Get Down moniker sometime in the future.

== Members ==
- Miles Mosley – upright bass & vocals
- Kamasi Washington – tenor saxophone
- Ryan Porter – trombone
- Tony Austin – drums
- Ronald Bruner Jr. – drums
- Cameron Graves – piano
- Brandon Coleman – keyboards
- Thundercat – electric bass
- Terrace Martin – alto saxophone, keyboards
- Patrice Quinn – background vocals

== Discography ==
The West Coast Get Down has been noted for their contributions to the following albums:

Year	Artist	Album	Additional Contributing Members	Ref.
2011	Thundercat	The Golden Age of the Apocalypse	Kamasi Washington, Brandon Coleman, Cameron Graves, Ronald Bruner Jr.	
2014	Miles Mosley and Tony Austin	BFI		
2015	Kendrick Lamar	To Pimp a Butterfly	Thundercat, Kamasi Washington, Ronald Bruner Jr.	
2015	Kamasi Washington	The Epic	Brandon Coleman, Cameron Graves, Miles Mosley, Thundercat, Ryan Porter, Tony Austin, Ronald Bruner Jr.	
2017	Cameron Graves	Planetary Prince	Thundercat, Kamasi Washington, Ryan Porter, Ronald Bruner Jr.	
2017	Ryan Porter	Spangle-Lang Lane	Kamasi Washington, Cameron Graves, Miles Mosley, Tony Austin, Patrice Quinn	
2017	Ronald Bruner Jr.	Triumph	Brandon Coleman, Cameron Graves, Miles Mosley, Thundercat, Ryan Porter, Tony Austin	
2017	Miles Mosley	Uprising	Kamasi Washington, Brandon Coleman, Cameron Graves, Tony Austin, Ryan Porter	
2017	Kamasi Washington	Harmony of Difference	Brandon Coleman, Cameron Graves, Miles Mosley, Thundercat, Ryan Porter, Tony Austin, Ronald Bruner Jr., Terrace Martin	
2018	Kamasi Washington	Heaven and Earth	Brandon Coleman, Cameron Graves, Miles Mosley, Thundercat, Ryan Porter, Tony Austin, Ronald Bruner Jr., Terrace Martin	
2018	Ryan Porter	The Optimist	Kamasi Washington, Brandon Coleman, Cameron Graves, Miles Mosley, Tony Austin	
2018	Brandon Coleman	Resistance	Kamasi Washington, Patrice Quinn, Ryan Porter	
2019	Ryan Porter	Force For Good	Kamasi Washington, Brandon Coleman, Cameron Graves, Miles Mosley, Thundercat, Tony Austin	
2020	Kamasi Washington	Becoming (soundtrack)		
2020	Dinner Party	Dinner Party	Kamasi Washington, Terrace Martin	
2020	Ryan Porter	Live at New Morning, Paris	Kamasi Washington, Brandon Coleman, Miles Mosley, Tony Austin	
2022	Brandon Coleman	Interstellar Black Space	Kamasi Washington, Patrice Quinn, Ryan Porter	
2024	Kamasi Washington	Fearless Movement	Brandon Coleman, Cameron Graves, Miles Mosley, Thundercat, Ryan Porter, Tony Austin, Ronald Bruner Jr., Terrace Martin, Patrice Quinn	
2026	Dinner Party	Enigmatic Society	Kamasi Washington, Terrace Martin	
