= Shine Through It =

Studio album by Terrence Howard
- Released: September 2, 2008
- Studios: Spiral (Hollywood); Chung King (Lower Manhattan)
- Genre: Symphonic folk-soul
- Length: 48:38
- Label: Sony
- Producers: Terrence Howard; Miles Mosley

Singles from Shine Through It
- 1. "Sanctuary" Released: July 1, 2008

Shine Through It is American actor Terrence Howard's debut studio album, released by Sony Music on September 2, 2008. All tracks were written by Howard, four of which were co-written by Miles Mosley, and one by Ilsey Juber. Howard and Mosley also produced the album and played many of the instruments on it. Critical reception of the album was middling, with critics agreeing that similar material had been handled better by Terence Trent D'Arby, while commercially, the album charted in the top 40 of the Billboard 200 and the top ten of Billboard's Top R&B/Hip-Hop Albums chart.

== Style and reception ==
Shine Through It ratings
Review scores
Source	Rating
AllMusic	3/5 stars
PopMatters	4/10

AllMusic's Stephen Thomas Erlewine said the album "can frequently be maddening" but found it "undeniably interesting, at once a quintessential oddity and a strangely promising debut". Summarizing the album's sound as "grandly, absurdly ambitious, symphonic folk-soul", Erlewine emphasized its "juxtapositions of folk, bossa nova, jazz, and soul" which "seem as accidental as they are intentional", and said that "ambition is not Howard's problem – if anything, he has too much of it – but execution is". PopMatters's Quentin B. Huff also called the album "ambitious", noting that "no two songs sound alike, although strings, guitars, and tempo changes seem to be staples in Terrence Howard's bag of music tricks." Huff criticized Howard's vocals as "the album's least compelling aspect", where his middle range is "sometimes scratchy, shakes and sounds distractingly unsteady." Both critics agreed that the album was reminiscent of, and would've been in better hands with, Terence Trent D'Arby, with Huff concluding that Howard "ends up sounding like a less convincing version of a guy who's famous for doing what he's trying to do now."

== Track listing ==
All tracks are written by Terrence Howard with others noted.

Shine Through It track listing
No.	Title	Writer(s)	Length
1.	"Love Makes You Beautiful"		5:16
2.	"Shine Through It"	Miles Mosley	3:48
3.	"Mr. Johnson's Lawn"		4:54
4.	"Sanctuary"	Ilsey Juber	4:45
5.	"No. 1 Fan"		4:59
6.	"Spanish Love Affair"		4:55
7.	"Plenty"	Mosley	3:42
8.	"I Remember When"	Mosley	3:11
9.	"It's All Game"		4:47
10.	"She Was Mine"		4:05
11.	"War"	Mosley	4:11
Total length:			48:38

== Personnel ==
=== Musicians ===
- Terrence Howard – lead vocals, backing vocals (2, 11), nylon guitar (1, 3–6, 10), handclaps (3), guitar (9), vocal intro (9), megaphone (11)
- Miles Mosley – upright bass (1–6, 8–11), backing vocals (2, 11), acoustic guitar (2), handclaps (3), drums (6), Fender Precision Bass (7), Hammond B3 (7), piano (7, 8), synthesizer (7), percussion (7), guitar (7, 8), whistle (8), Fender Rhodes (11)
- Kenneth Crouch – piano (1–6, 9–11), celesta (1), timpani (1), harpsichord (1), toy piano (2), synthesizers (2), vibraphone (4), Mellotron (4), tubular bells (4)
- Aaron McLendon – drums (1–6, 9, 10), percussion (2, 6, 9, 10), handclaps (3), shaker (3)
- Chris Lea – flute (1–4, 6, 9), baritone saxophone (3, 11)
- Kamasi Washington – tenor saxophone (1–6, 9–11)
- Serafin Aguilar – trumpet (1–6, 9–11), flugelhorn (6, 9)
- Elizabeth Lea – trombone (1–6, 9–11)
- Matt Roberts – guitar (3–6)
- KC Haxton – handclaps (3)
- Daniel Ondarza – French horn (4, 6)
- Manuel – guitar intro (6)
- Danti Lopez – timbales (6)
- Nir Z – drums (7, 8)
- Igmar Thomas – trumpet (7, 8), flugelhorn (7, 8)
- Tom Lea – viola, whistle (8)
- Ross Garrin and William Barrett – harmonica (8)
- Henry Hank Harris – guitar (10)
- Justin Avery – Fender Rhodes (10)
- Patrice Quinn – backing vocals (1, 4)
- Ilsey Juber – backing vocals (1)
- Hunter Howard – backing vocals (2)
- Fanny Franklin – backing vocals (3)
- Renee Neufville – backing vocals (7, 8)
- Aubrey Howard – phone voice (1)
- Danvy Pham – phone voice (3)

=== Technical ===
- Terrence Howard – producer, string arrangements (1, 3–6, 8, 10, 11), horn arrangements (1–6, 8, 10, 11)
- Miles Mosley – producer, string arrangements (1, 3–6, 8, 10, 11), horn arrangements (1–6, 8, 10, 11)
- Ken Hurtz – recording engineer (1–6, 9–11)
- Jon Choukroun, Doug Strub, and Daniel Khim – assistant recording engineers (1–6, 9–11)
- Jamie Siegel – recording engineer (7, 8)
- Andy Marcinkoawski – assistant recording engineers (7, 8)
- Bob Clearmountain – mixing engineer
- Brandon Duncan – assistant mixing engineer
- Bob Ludwig – mastering engineer
- Tom Lea – string arrangements (1, 3–6)
- Kamasi Washington – horn arrangements (1, 2, 4, 5, 11)
- Serafin Aguilar – horn arrangements (11)

==== Artwork ====
- Maria Paula Marulanda – art director
- Anthony Mandler – photographer
- Dale Terbush – landscape paintings

==== Recording locations ====
- Recorded at Spiral Sound, Hollywood, California (Hurtz) and Chung King Studios, Lower Manhattan, New York (Siegel)
- Mixed at Mix This! Studios, Malibu, California
- Mastered at Gateway Mastering, Portland, Maine

== Charts ==
Chart (2008)	Peak position
US Billboard 200	31
US Top R&B/Hip-Hop Albums (Billboard)	6
