= Brandon Coleman =

Brandon Coleman may refer to:

- Brandon Coleman (musician), American jazz pianist
- Brandon Coleman (wide receiver) (born 1992), American football player
- Brandon Coleman (offensive lineman) (born 2000), American football player
