= The Choice (EP) =

EP by Kamasi Washington
- Released: June 29, 2018
- Genre: Contemporary jazz
- Length: 38:41
- Label: Young Turks
- Producer: Kamasi Washington

Kamasi Washington chronology
Heaven and Earth (2018)	The Choice (2018)	Becoming (Music from the Netflix Original Documentary) (2020)

Professional ratings
Review scores
Source	Rating
Pitchfork	6.5/10

The Choice is an extended play by American jazz saxophonist Kamasi Washington. It was billed as a companion extended play for his fourth studio album, Heaven and Earth, which was released on June 22, 2018.

== Background ==
Upon the vinyl and CD releases of Heaven and Earth, it was noted that there was a fifth record or CD encased in the centrefold of the cover. By cutting open the packaging, one could access a pressing of The Choice. When this information became publicised, an official version of The Choice was made available on June 29, one week after Heaven and Earth's initial release.

== Critical reception ==
The Choice received favourable reviews from critics. In a review for Pitchfork, Andy Beta scored the album a 6.5/10, stating that "[Washington explored] his mellower side without breaking any significantly new ground".

== Track listing ==
All tracks are written by Kamasi Washington except as noted.

No.	Title	Length
1.	"The Secret of Jinsinson"	8:08
2.	"Will You Love Me Tomorrow" (Gerry Goffin, Carole King)	9:41
3.	"My Family"	6:35
4.	"Agents Of Multiverse"	5:23
5.	"Ooh Child" (Stan Vincent)	8:54
Total length:		38:41

Notes

- "Will You Love Me Tomorrow" is a cover of Carole King and Gerry Goffin's 1960 song of the same name.
- "Ooh Child" is a cover of the Five Stairsteps 1970 song "O-o-h Child".
