= Throttle Elevator Music =

Jazz collective

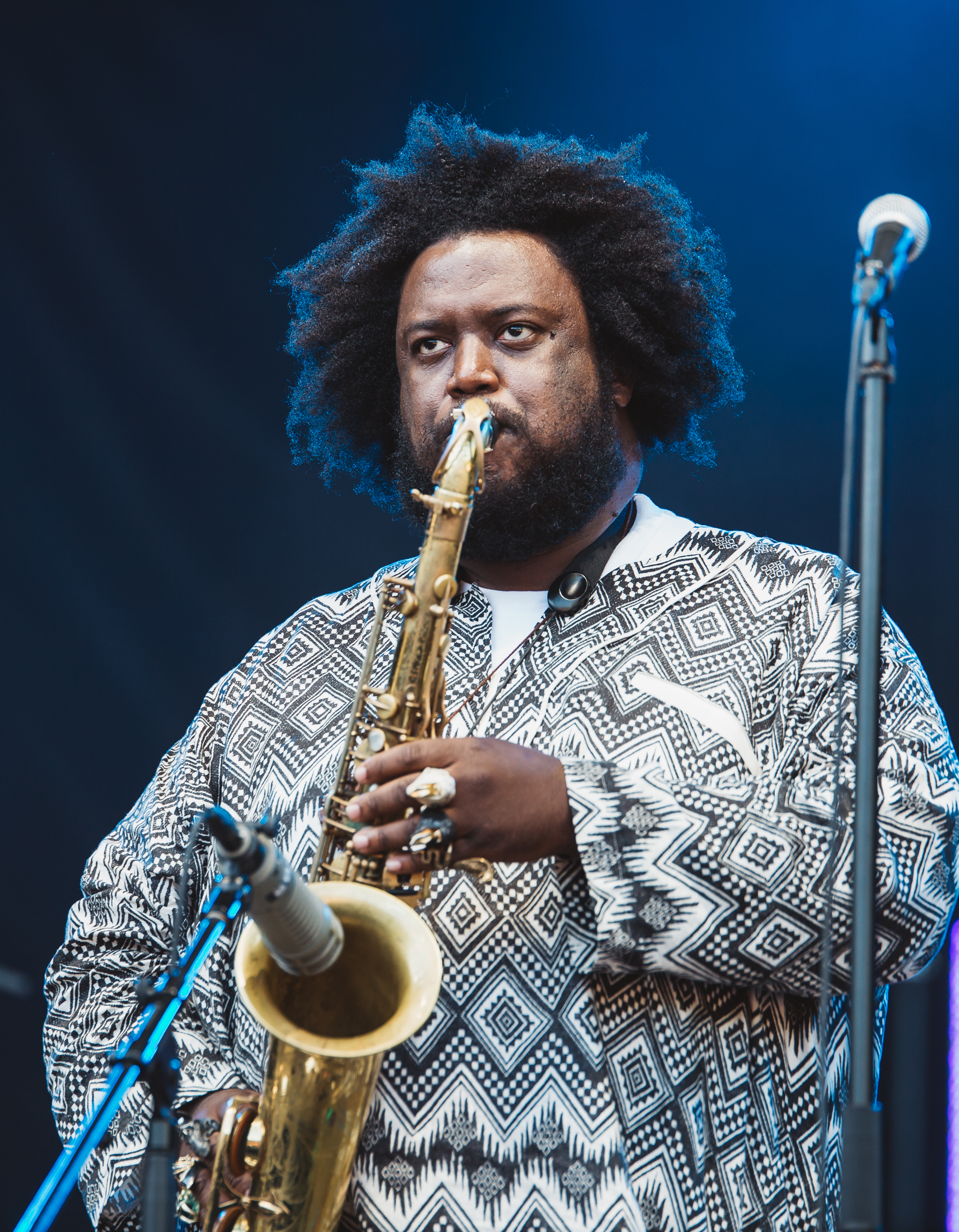
- Washington in 2017

Background information
- Genres: Jazz
- Years active: 2011–2021
- Past members: Kamasi Washington, Matt Montgomery, Mike "Lumpy" Hughes, Gregory Howe, Ross Howe, Erik Jekabson, Kasey Knudsen, Mike Blankenship

Throttle Elevator Music, occasionally billed as Throttle Elevator Music feat. Kamasi Washington, was a San Francisco Bay Area jazz ensemble active from 2011 to 2021. The group is influenced by punk, funk, hip-hop, and ska, while its performers were primarily composed of classically trained jazz instrumentalists.

The group released seven albums, all under the Wide Hive label. Compositions were original — composed by bassist Matt Montgomery, drummer Mike "Lumpy" Hughes, and guitarist/Wide Hive-founder Gregory Howe — with the performances headlined by saxophonist Kamasi Washington, who remained with the group after rising to widespread fame for his collaborations with superstar rapper Kendrick Lamar following the release of 2015's To Pimp A Butterfly.

== Career ==
The group — then primarily the quartet of Washington, Hughes, Montgomery and Howe — began playing together in 2011 before releasing their eponymous, high-energy debut the following year.

The albums Area J, Jagged Rocks and Throttle Elevator Music IV were released in 2014, 2015 and 2016, respectively.

Retrorespective, Throttle Elevator Music's fifth album, was initially intended to be its last. It was released in 2017.

The sixth and seventh albums, 2020's Emergency Exit and 2021's Final Floor, were assembled from previously unreleased recordings.

Eight different musicians are credited as contributing to the band's discography: Washington, Hughes, Montgomery, Gregory Howe, guitarist Ross Howe, trumpet and flugelhorn player Erik Jekabson, saxophonist Kasey Knudsen, and keyboardist Mike Blankenship.

== Disbandment ==
With Throttle Elevator Music effectively disbanded, Gregory Howe formed Counterweight in 2018 with Jekabson, Montgomery and Hughes. Contributors to Counterweight's self-titled debut included Knudsen and guitarist Mike Ramos.

== Discography ==
- Throttle Elevator Music (Wide Hive, 2012)
- Area J (Wide Hive, 2014)
- Jagged Rocks (Wide Hive, 2015)
- Throttle Elevator Music IV (Wide Hive, 2016)
- Retrorespective (Wide Hive, 2017)
- Emergency Exit (Wide Hive, 2020)
- Final Floor (Wide Hive, 2021)
