= Santa Line Slaying =

1971 homicide in Cleveland, Ohio

The Santa Line Slaying was a highly publicized physical altercation that occurred in the line at a Higbee's department store waiting to meet Santa on December 21, 1971, in Cleveland, Ohio, United States. The incident resulted in the death of one man, Jack Fitzpatrick, with the other man involved, Tyrone Howard, suffering a scrotal injury. Howard was convicted of manslaughter and served 11 months in prison. In 2005, the incident attracted some attention again when it was revealed that Tyrone Howard is the father of actor Terrence Howard, who witnessed the incident as a young boy. Terrence Howard gave an interview on Oprah about the incident, but his account of what happened was later contradicted by his father, who accused him of trying to garner publicity for his own career.

== Incident ==
The exact sequence of events of the fight are disputed, but the parties involved agree that 21-year-old Tyrone Howard and his pregnant wife took their three sons (one of whom was two-year-old Terrence) to see Santa Claus at a Higbee's department store in Cleveland, Ohio's Public Square. Also waiting in the long line was 36-year-old Jack Fitzpatrick, who was with three of his own children while his pregnant wife shopped with their oldest daughter. At one point the Howards were accused of cutting in the line by some of the others waiting, including Fitzpatrick. An argument began between the two men, and at some point Fitzpatrick grabbed Howard, pinned him against a wall and kneed him in the groin. Howard's groin began bleeding from a previous injury he received on his job. Howard then used a sharp object to stab Fitzpatrick several times in the thighs and neck until Fitzpatrick fell to the floor. Howard fled to his mother's home. Hours later, he turned himself in to police. Fitzpatrick was taken to a nearby hospital and died from his wounds.

== Aftermath ==
The incident made headlines in the local Cleveland newspapers who called the incident "The Santa Line Slaying". It was also widely reported in newspapers around the country. The local newspapers reported the altercation as racially-motivated due to Fitzpatrick being white and Howard being black. Some witnesses claimed that racial slurs were used by Fitzpatrick. It was also reported that the weapon Howard used was a knife which he had in his jacket. Cleveland's then-Mayor Ralph Perk publicly denounced Howard as a murderer. The Episcopal bishop of Ohio called the slaying an "atrocity," and compared it to the Biblical story of Herod the Great's Massacre of the Innocents.

Howard was charged with second-degree murder and pleaded self-defense. Fitzpatrick's alleged use of racial epithets was denied by Howard's wife in the resulting trial. But she did testify that he said "Doing things like this has set your race back five years." Howard testified that he angrily cursed at Fitzpatrick and that led to the altercation. The widow, Mary Fitzpatrick, testified that a security guard separated the two men during the scuffle but Howard then pulled a knife from his jacket and lunged at Fitzpatrick with it. Howard and witnesses testified that while Howard was pinned against the wall, a woman handed him a nail file which he used to stab Fitzpatrick. But the nail file was never recovered and the unidentified woman never came forward. According to the jury foreman, Jack Petro, "the issue of race did not come up as a factor in the jury room." After a long deliberation, Howard was convicted of manslaughter and received a sentence of 1-to-25 years in prison. After 11 months, Howard was paroled for good behavior. Howard had no previous criminal record before the incident. He and his wife divorced shortly after his release from prison.

== Terrence Howard's account ==
While promoting the film Crash on The Oprah Winfrey Show, Terrence Howard spoke about his father's involvement in the "Santa Line Slaying". It was the first time he publicly spoke of the incident. As the cast of the film discussed racism in American society, Howard gave an emotional account of the altercation, which he claimed was racially motivated. In Terrence Howard's telling, when he and his mother joined the line Fitzpatrick assumed Tyrone, whose complexion is much lighter than the other Howards, was white and asked him "Why did you let those niggers cut you?" Howard said that his father told Fitzpatrick that they were his wife and kids and turned around. Terrence claimed that Fitzpatrick then grabbed his father by the throat and pinned him to the wall. He claimed that Fitzpatrick was 6' 4" tall while his father stood only 5' 8".

His father's imprisonment caused the family to move from their suburban home to a housing project in an underprivileged neighborhood.

== Tyrone Howard's account ==
Tyrone was invited to appear on the program with Terrence but refused. Shortly after Terrence's account of the incident, Tyrone gave an interview to the Cleveland newspaper, The Plain Dealer, in which he claims that his son misrepresented his story and maintained that the altercation was not racially motivated.

It wasn't nothing racial that went down. It was two men standing there, both of us acting like damn fools . . . instead of one of us taking the man's role and walking away.

According to Howard in his interview, after standing in the long line for about 30 minutes, he told his pregnant wife to take Terrence and find a place to sit down. Approximately 45 minutes later, Howard and his sons were close to the front of the line. Howard called for his wife and youngest son to join him in the line. Other people waiting in the line, including Fitzpatrick, did not realize that the woman entering the line was Howard's wife and accused him of letting her cut in. Howard cursed at Fitzpatrick and yelled "If you have anything to say to my wife, say it to me!" Fitzpatrick said "That's a cheap trick, buddy!" and at that point grabbed Howard and pinned him against the wall. After Fitzpatrick fell to the floor from the stabbing, Howard knelt down and tried to put pressure on Fitzpatrick's wounds to stop the bleeding. Some witnesses advised him to flee and he did so in fear. In the interview, Howard expressed remorse for initiating the altercation which led to Fitzpatrick's slaying.

Tyrone Howard said of his son's appearance on Oprah:

Oprah wanted a sob story, he was there with a sob story. Terrence needed publicity, and I became the meat. I was the feast that day.

After Tyrone Howard's revelation, Terrence's account of the events was removed from the Oprah website and replaced with a different part of his interview.

== Fitzpatrick family's version ==
According to the Fitzpatricks, Jack did nothing to initiate the altercation and was simply defending himself, though evidence shows he was the initial aggressor. They testified that the Howards cut in the line numerous times and Jack told them "It's not right to sponge in line." (Howard's wife and other witnesses also testified that Fitzpatrick said words to that effect.) In response to Terrence Howard's statements, Jack's daughter, Peggy, who was nine years old at the time, maintained in The Plain Dealer that since Fitzpatrick was a seminarian, he was not a man who was prone to violence. She also denied Terrence Howard's claim of her father's large size, stating that Fitzpatrick was 5'8", and expressed some admiration for Terrence Howard for overcoming his traumatic childhood to become a successful actor.
