= Ronald Bruner Jr. =

American drummer (born 1982)

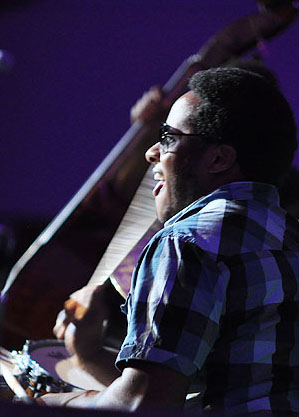
- Bruner performing with The Stanley Clarke Band in June 2010

Background information
- Born: Ronald Ray Bruner Jr. October 5, 1982 (age 43); Los Angeles, California, U.S.
- Genres: Jazz; jazz fusion; funk; jazz-funk; avant-garde jazz; crossover thrash
- Occupations: Musician; composer; songwriter; record producer
- Instruments: Drums
- Years active: 2000–present
- Member of: West Coast Get Down
- Formerly of: Young Jazz Giants; The Stanley Clarke Band; Suicidal Tendencies

Ronald Ray Bruner Jr. (born October 5, 1982) is an American drummer, composer and producer. He has played with hardcore punk/crossover thrash band Suicidal Tendencies. Bruner was part of the band that received a Grammy Award for Best Contemporary Jazz Album in 2010 for The Stanley Clarke Band.

He is the older brother of musicians Stephen Bruner (better known as Thundercat) and Jameel Bruner (also known as Kintaro). He frequently performs alongside Thundercat, Kamasi Washington, and cousin Terrace Martin as a member of the Los Angeles jazz collective West Coast Get Down. In 2015, he appeared with the collective on Washington's major-label debut album, The Epic.

== Discography ==
=== Studio albums ===
List of studio albums, with year released
Title	Album details
Triumph	Released: March 3, 2017; Label: World Galaxy; Formats: Digital download, streaming, LP

=== Other appearances ===
Year	Artist	Release	Additional information
2004	Young Jazz Giants	Young Jazz Giants	Drums on full album
2007	Kamasi Washington	The Proclamation	Drums on full album
2008	SMV	Thunder	Drums on "Maestros de Las Frecuencias Bajas", "Lil' Victa" and "Grits"
2009	Suicidal Tendencies	Year of the Cycos	Drums on "It's Automatic"
2010	The Stanley Clarke Band	The Stanley Clarke Band	Drums on full album
2010	George Duke	Déjà Vu	Drums on full album
2010	Suicidal Tendencies	No Mercy Fool!/The Suicidal Family	Drums on full album
2012	Kenny Garrett	Seeds from the Underground	Drums on full album
2013	Suicidal Tendencies	13	Drums on "God Only Knows Who I Am", "Till My Last Breath" and "Life... (Can't Live with It, Can't Live Without It)"
2013	George Duke	Brazilian Fusion	Drums on full album
2014	Flying Lotus	You're Dead!	Drums on "Cold Dead"
2015	Kendrick Lamar	To Pimp a Butterfly	Drums on "The Blacker the Berry"
2015	Kamasi Washington	The Epic	Drums on "Isabelle", "Final Thought", "The Rhythm Changes", "Miss Understanding", "Seven Prayers", "Henrietta Our Hero", "The Magnificent 7", "Re Run Home", "Malcolm's Theme" and "The Message"
2016	Terrace Martin	Velvet Portraits	Drums on "Curly Martin"
2016	Kenny Garrett	Do Your Dance!	Drums on full album
2017	Cameron Graves	Planetary Prince	Drums on full album
2017	Kamasi Washington	Harmony of Difference	Drums on full album
2018	Kamasi Washington	Heaven and Earth	Drums on full album
2019	Flying Lotus	Flamagra	Drums on "Takashi" and "Thank U Malcolm"; backing vocals on "Find Your Own Way Home"
2020	Thundercat	It Is What It Is	Drums on "Innerstellar Love"
2021	Kenny Garrett	Sounds From the Ancestors	Drums on full album
2024	Kamasi Washington	Fearless Movement	Drums on "Lesanu", "Asha the First", "The Visionary", "Together", "The Garden Path", "Interstellar Peace (The Last Stance)", "Road to Self (KO)", "Lines in the Sand" and "Prologue"; composition on "Get Lit"
2025	Mac Miller	Balloonerism	Drums and co-production on "5 Dollar Pony Rides"
