= The Epic (album) =

Studio album by Kamasi Washington
- Released: May 5, 2015
- Studios: Kingsize Soundlabs (Los Angeles, California)
- Genres: Avant-garde jazz, spiritual jazz
- Length: 173:36
- Label: Brainfeeder
- Producer: Kamasi Washington

Kamasi Washington chronology
Light of the World (2008)	The Epic (2015)	Harmony of Difference (2017)

Singles from The Epic
- 1. "Re Run Home" Released: March 10, 2015; 2. "Miss Understanding" Released: April 8, 2015

The Epic is the third studio album by American jazz saxophonist Kamasi Washington and his first to be released on a record label. It was released on May 5, 2015, by the Brainfeeder record label.

== Background ==
Washington began assembling what would become his core musical collective, the West Coast Get Down, during his childhood in Los Angeles. He had known drummer Ronald Bruner Jr. since the age of three and grew up alongside many of the musicians who would later perform on The Epic. Washington is a graduate of the Academy of Music of Alexander Hamilton High School in Los Angeles and later studied ethnomusicology at UCLA, where he played with faculty members including Kenny Burrell, Billy Higgins, and bandleader Gerald Wilson.

The album's genesis can be traced to Washington's reconnection with producer Steven Ellison, known as Flying Lotus, whom he had met in the mid-1990s when Ellison attended a John Coltrane competition won by Washington's first band. Flying Lotus, whose family lineage includes Alice Coltrane, offered Washington the opportunity to record an album for his boundary-defying Brainfeeder label. Washington was given creative freedom to pursue his vision.

In December 2011, Washington and his collective of musicians pooled their resources to rent out Kingsize Soundlabs in Los Angeles for a month-long recording session. The sessions were densely packed, with multiple musicians placed in the same rooms due to space constraints. The core band, sometimes called "The Next Step," included two bassists (Miles Mosley and Thundercat), two drummers (Ronald Bruner Jr. and Tony Austin), two keyboard players (Cameron Graves and Brandon Coleman), a horn section, and vocalist Patrice Quinn, who sang from the control room. The collective recorded prolifically, producing approximately 190 songs across eight different projects during the month, of which 45 were Washington's own compositions.

The 17 songs that would become The Epic were selected from this wealth of material and augmented with a 32-piece orchestra and a 20-person choir, for which Washington wrote the arrangements. Washington developed a narrative concept for the album inspired by a recurring dream he experienced while writing the string and choir parts, which he described to Flying Lotus when presenting the music. To Washington's surprise, Lotus readily accepted the ambitious triple-album format.

== Critical reception ==
Professional ratings
Aggregate scores
Source	Rating
AnyDecentMusic?	7.9/10
Metacritic	83/100
Review scores
Source	Rating
AllMusic	5/5 stars
Drowned in Sound	8/10
Financial Times	4/5 stars
The Guardian	4/5 stars
The Irish Times	5/5 stars
Louder Than War	8/10
Pitchfork	8.6/10
Rolling Stone	3.5/5 stars
Tom Hull	B+
Uncut	8/10

Upon its release, The Epic was widely celebrated by music critics. At Metacritic, which assigns a normalized rating out of 100 to reviews from critics, the album received an average score of 83, which indicates "universal acclaim", based on 7 reviews. the AllMusic critic Thom Jurek described the album as "21st century jazz as accessible as it is virtuosic -- feel matters to Washington", and further wrote, "Holistic in breadth and deep in vision, it provides a way into this music for many, and challenges the cultural conversation about jazz without compromising or pandering." Russell Warfield of Drowned in Sound described the album as "wonderful stuff" and that the record "deserves a high score by any standards of evaluation".

The Guardian critic, John Fordham, who was positive in his assessment of the album, wrote, "Only a shortage of thematic surprises – given its extravagant length – keeps it from being quite the seismically jazz-changing departure that some admirers are claiming." Seth Colter Walls of Pitchfork awarded the album the "Best New Music" tag, writing, "The Epic actually makes good on its titular promise without bothering to make even a faint-hearted stab in the direction of fulfilling its pre-release hype."

=== Accolades ===
Publication	Accolade	Year	Rank
The Guardian	The Best Albums of 2015	2015	8
Pitchfork	The 50 Best Albums of 2015	2015	10
Pitchfork	The 200 Best Albums of the 2010s	2019	58
Rough Trade	Albums of the Year 2015	2015	7
Stereogum	The 50 Best Albums of 2015	2015	35
The Wire	Releases of the Year 1–50	2015	8
Rolling Stone	The 100 Best Albums of the 2010s	2019	82

== Track listing ==
=== CD ===
All tracks are written by Kamasi Washington, except where noted.

Volume 1: The Plan
No.	Title	Writer(s)	Length
1.	"Change of the Guard"		12:15
2.	"Askim"		12:34
3.	"Isabelle"		12:12
4.	"Final Thought"		6:31
5.	"The Next Step"		14:48
6.	"The Rhythm Changes"	Patrice Quinn; Washington	7:45
Total length:			66:05

Volume 2: The Glorious Tale
No.	Title	Writer(s)	Length
1.	"Miss Understanding"		8:46
2.	"Leroy and Lanisha"		9:24
3.	"Re Run"		8:19
4.	"Seven Prayers"		7:35
5.	"Henrietta Our Hero"	Quinn; Washington	7:13
6.	"The Magnificent 7"		12:48
Total length:			54:05

Volume 3: The Historic Repetition
No.	Title	Writer(s)	Length
1.	"Re Run Home"		14:06
2.	"Cherokee"	Ray Noble	8:14
3.	"Clair de Lune"	Claude Debussy	11:07
4.	"Malcolm's Theme"	Terence Blanchard; Ossie Davis	8:40
5.	"The Message"		11:11
Total length:			53:18

Vinyl Triple LP track listing

Volume 1: The Plan

1. "A1. Change of the Guard" — 12:16
2. "A2. Isabelle" — 12:13
3. "A3. Final Thought" — 6:32
4. "B1. The Next Step" — 14:49
5. "B2. Askim" — 12:35

Volume 2: The Glorious Tale

1. "A1. The Rhythm Changes" — 7:44
2. "A2. Leroy and Lanisha" — 9:24
3. "A3. Re Run" — 8:20
4. "B1. Miss Understanding" — 8:46
5. "B2. Henrietta Our Hero" — 7:14
6. "B3. Seven Prayers" — 7:36
7. "B4. Cherokee" — 8:14

Volume 3: The Historic Repetition

1. "A1. The Magnificent 7" — 12:46
2. "A2. Re Run Home" — 14:06
3. "B1. Malcolm's Theme" — 8:41
4. "B2. Clair de Lune" — 11:08
5. "B3. The Message" — 11:09

== Personnel ==
Credits adapted from vinyl liner notes.

Band

- Kamasi Washington – tenor saxophone, band leader, arrangement, production (all tracks)
- Thundercat – electric bass (tracks 1, 2, 5–7, 10, 12, 13, 17)
- Miles Mosley – upright bass (tracks 1–13, 15–17), electric bass (track 14)
- Ronald Bruner Jr. – drums (tracks 3, 4, 6, 7, 10–13, 16, 17)
- Tony Austin – drums (tracks 1, 2, 4–6, 8, 9, 12, 13, 15–17), engineering (tracks 1–2, 4–13, 15–17)
- Leon Mobley – percussion (tracks 2–4, 8–10, 17)
- Cameron Graves – piano (tracks 1–6, 9–13, 15–17), organ (track 8)
- Brandon Coleman – keyboards (tracks 1, 2, 6, 7, 9, 12–14, 17), organ (tracks 3–5, 10–12, 14–16), piano (track 8)
- Ryan Porter – trombone (tracks 1–10, 12–17)
- Igmar Thomas – trumpet (track 1, 2, 5–7, 9, 12, 13, 17)
- Dwight Trible – lead vocals (track 16)
- Patrice Quinn – lead vocals (tracks 6, 11, 14, 16)

Additional musicians

- Robert Miller – drums (track 14)
- Shaunte Palmer – trombone (track 11)
- Todd Simon – trumpet (track 11)

Ensemble – (tracks 1, 2, 5–7, 9, 11, 12, 15)

- Neel Hammond – violin
- Tylana Renga Enomoto – violin
- Paul Cartwright – violin
- Jennifer Simone – violin
- Lucia Micarelli – violin
- Molly Rogers – viola
- Andrea Whitt – viola
- Artyom Manukyan – cello
- Ginger Murphy – cello
- Dawn Norfleet – choir vocals
- Thalma de Freitas – choir vocals
- Maiya Sykes – choir vocals
- Gina Manziello – choir vocals
- Patrice Quinn – choir vocals
- Natasha F. Agrama – choir vocals
- Dwight Trible – choir vocals
- Steven Wayne – choir vocals
- Taylor Graves – choir vocals
- Charles Jones – choir vocals
- Jason Marales – choir vocals
- Dexter Story – choir vocals
- Cameron Graves – choir vocals
- Tracy Carter – choir vocals
- Chris Constable – engineering

Technical

- Brian Rosemeyer – engineering (tracks 3, 14)
- Benjamin Tierney – mixing engineer
- Daddy Kev – mastering engineer

== Charts ==
=== Weekly charts ===
Chart (2015)	Peak position
US Heatseekers Albums (Billboard)	2
US Independent Albums (Billboard)	18
US Top Jazz Albums (Billboard)	3

=== Year-end charts ===
Chart (2016)	Position
Belgian Albums (Ultratop Flanders)	145

== Certifications ==
Region	Certification	Certified units/sales
Germany (BVMI)	Platinum	20,000^{‡}
^{‡} Sales+streaming figures based on certification alone.
