= Light of the World (album) =

Studio album by Kamasi Washington
- Released: 2008
- Genres: Jazz, jazz fusion
- Length: 65:22
- Label: self-released
- Producer: Kamasi Washington

Kamasi Washington chronology
The Proclamation (2007)	Light of the World (2008)	The Epic (2015)

Light of the World is the second studio album by American jazz saxophonist Kamasi Washington, credited on the cover as dedicated to Roland Edwards Jr and generally concerning spiritual and Christianity-related subjects. The record was released independently in 2008. It became his last underground album before The Epic, which came out in 2015.

== Track listing ==
Based on Rate Your Music.

1. Going Up Yonder – 12:58
2. The Way, the Truth, and the Light – 3:48
3. Give Thanks – 13:29
4. The Lord's Prayer – 4:27
5. Amazing Grace – 9:04
6. Listen Closely – 13:51
7. When I Think About Jesus – 7:45

== Personnel ==
Based on:

- Tenor saxophone – Kamasi Washington
- Bass – Jae Deal
- Drums – Robert Miller
- Rhodes – Brandon Coleman
- Trombone – Ryan Porter (track 4)
- Vocals – Manhi-Xan (track 4)
