= Miles Mosley =

American musician

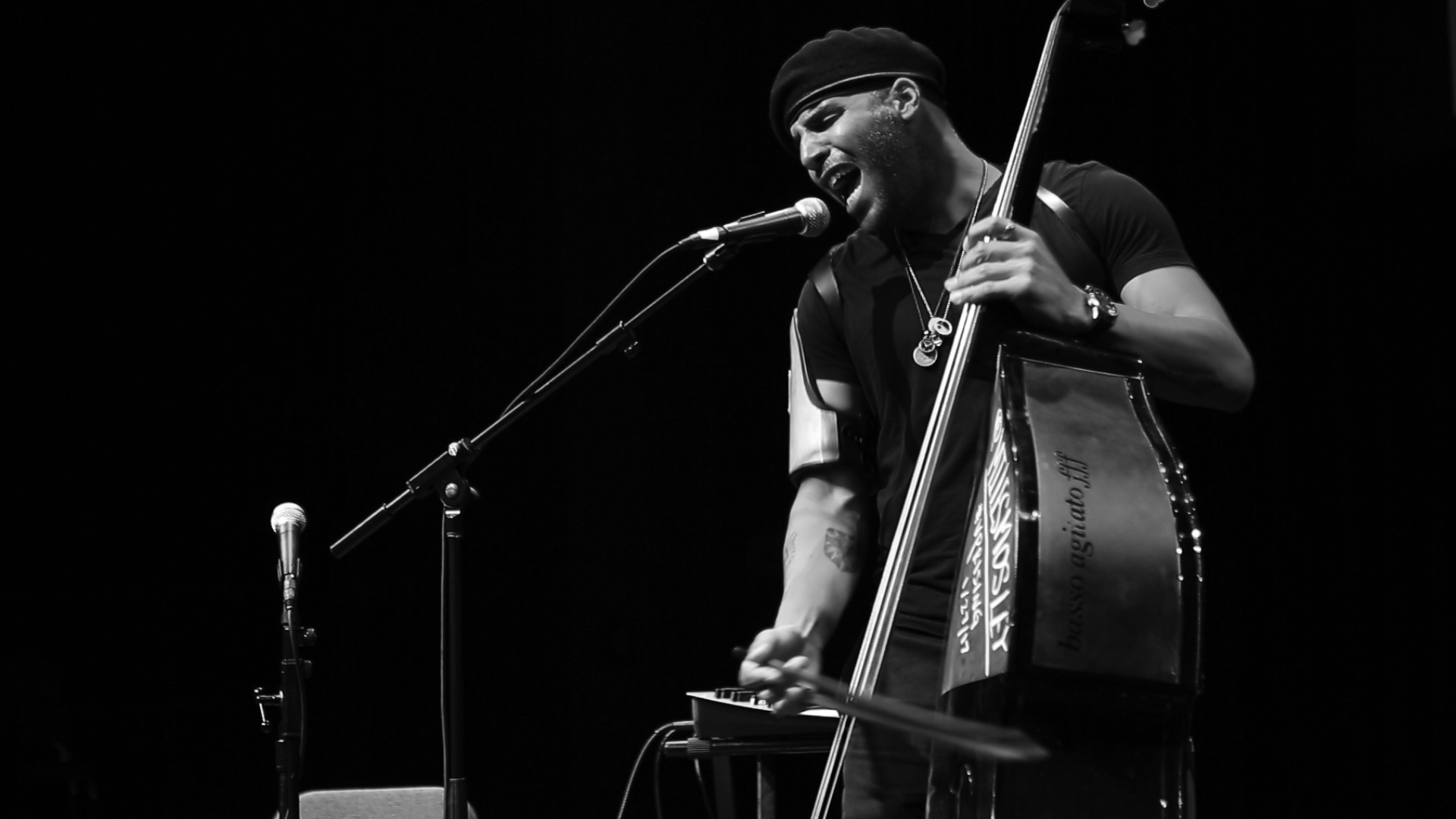
- Upright bassist and vocalist Miles Mosley

Background information
- Origin: Hollywood, California, U.S.
- Genres: Jazz; soul; hip-hop; fusion; rock
- Occupations: Musician; singer; songwriter; composer; producer
- Instruments: Vocals; double bass; guitar; piano
- Years active: 2005–present
- Member of: West Coast Get Down
- Website: milesmosley.com

Miles Mosley is an American musician, record producer, and composer from Hollywood, California. He is known for his vocal and bass performance, as well as his work as a composer, arranger, and music producer. Mosley is a founding member of the West Coast Get Down, a jazz collective featuring musicians like Kamasi Washington, Terrace Martin, and Thundercat. He was named after the jazz musician Miles Davis. Mosley studied double bass under jazz bassists John Clayton, Ray Brown, and Al McKibbon.

== Select discography ==
- 2005 – As a solo artist – Sicaceremony
- 2005 – Kamasi Washington – Live at 5th Street Dick's
- 2006 – India.Arie – Testimony: Vol. 1, Life & Relationship
- 2006 – As a solo artist – Taming the Proud
- 2007 – Chris Cornell – Carry On
- 2007 – Avenged Sevenfold – Avenged Sevenfold
- 2007 – Jonathan Davis and the SFA – Alone I Play
- 2007 – As a solo artist – Bear
- 2008 – Terrence Howard – Shine Through It
- 2008 – Everlast – Love, War and the Ghost of Whitey Ford
- 2008 – Kenny Loggins – How About Now
- 2015 – Andra Day – Cheers to the Fall (album)
- 2015 – Kamasi Washington – The Epic
- 2015 – Kendrick Lamar – To Pimp a Butterfly (album)
- 2016 – As a solo artist – "Abraham" (single) [Alpha Pup Records/World Galaxy]
- 2017 – Uprising (featuring West Coast Get Down) [Universal Music/Verve Label Group]
- 2018 – Kamasi Washington – Heaven and Earth
- 2018 – Jonathan Davis – Black Labyrinth
- 2019 – As a solo artist – "BROTHER" (single) [Universal Music/Verve Label Group]
