= Terrence Howard =

American actor (born 1969)

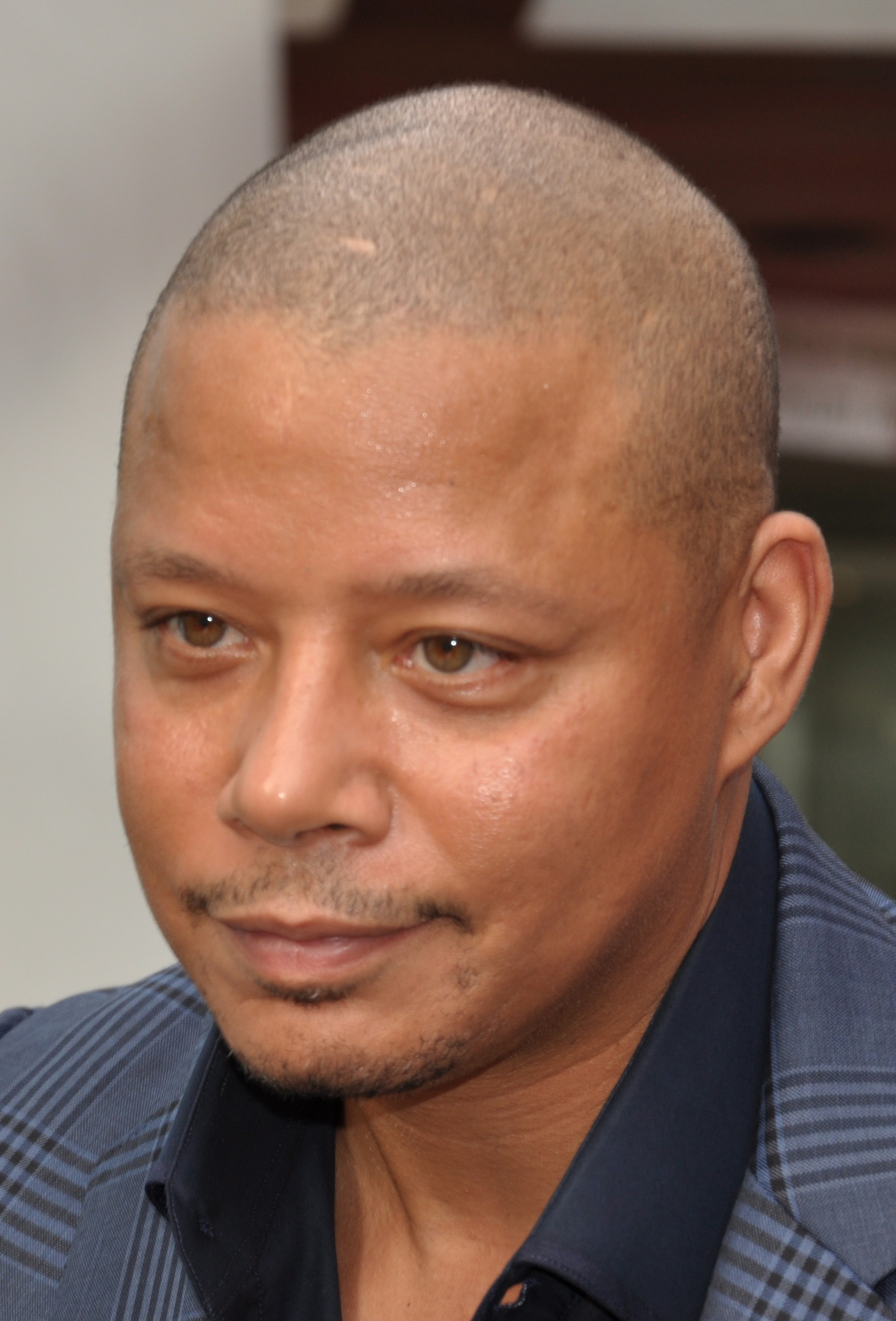
- Howard in 2015
- Born: Terrence Dashon Howard; March 11, 1969 (age 57); Chicago, Illinois, U.S.
- Occupation: Actor
- Years active: 1992–present
- Spouses: Lori McCommas (m. 1993; div. 2001) (m. 2005; div. 2007) Michelle Ghent (m. 2010; div. 2013) Mira Pak (m. 2013; div. 2015)
- Children: 5

Terrence Dashon Howard (born March 11, 1969) is an American actor performing on film and television. He has received a Screen Actors Guild Award as well as nominations for an Academy Award, a Golden Globe Award, and two Independent Spirit Awards.

Howard made his film debut in a minor role in the buddy comedy Who's the Man? (1993). In 1995 he had a minor role in Mr. Holland's Opus. He later was nominated for the Academy Award for Best Actor for his role as a pimp and drug dealer in Hustle & Flow (2005). He played James "Rhodey" Rhodes in the first Marvel Cinematic Universe film Iron Man (2008).

He played Quentin Spivey in the films The Best Man (1999) and The Best Man Holiday (2013) and the miniseries The Best Man: The Final Chapters (2022). On television, he portrayed Jackie Jackson in The Jacksons: An American Dream (1992), Al Cowlings in The O. J. Simpson Story (1995), Cassius Clay in King of the World (2000), and Ralph Abernathy in Boycott (2001). He won an NAACP Image Award for his role in Lackawanna Blues (2005). He starred as the lead character Lucious Lyon in the Fox musical drama series Empire from 2015 to 2020.

Howard made his Broadway debut playing Brick in the revival of the Tennessee Williams play Cat on a Hot Tin Roof (2008). His debut album, Shine Through It, was released in September 2008. In December 2022, Howard announced that he planned to retire from acting, but has since appeared in several films and television shows.

== Early life ==
Howard was born in Chicago, on March 11, 1969, to Tyrone and Anita (née Williams) Howard, who were both of African and English ancestry. His great-grandmother was actress Minnie Gentry. Howard was raised in Cleveland, Ohio, where he had a rocky childhood. He has claimed that he endured beatings from his physically abusive father, and that he saw his father stabbing another man in the Santa Line Slaying when Terrence was two years old. His father was convicted of manslaughter and served 11 months in jail. Howard's parents divorced upon his father's release. He was raised by his great-grandmother, who died at the age of 77 in 1993.

== Career ==
Howard made his big film break in 1995's Mr. Holland's Opus and Dead Presidents. He continued being cast in television and movie roles, and co-starred as Greg Sparks in the late-1990s short-lived television series Sparks with James L. Avery Sr. and Miguel A. Nunez Jr. Howard also appeared in The Best Man (1999), in Ashanti's music video for her 2002 single "Foolish", and in Mary J. Blige's video for "Be Without You". Howard also made an appearance on the TV series Family Matters and Moesha.

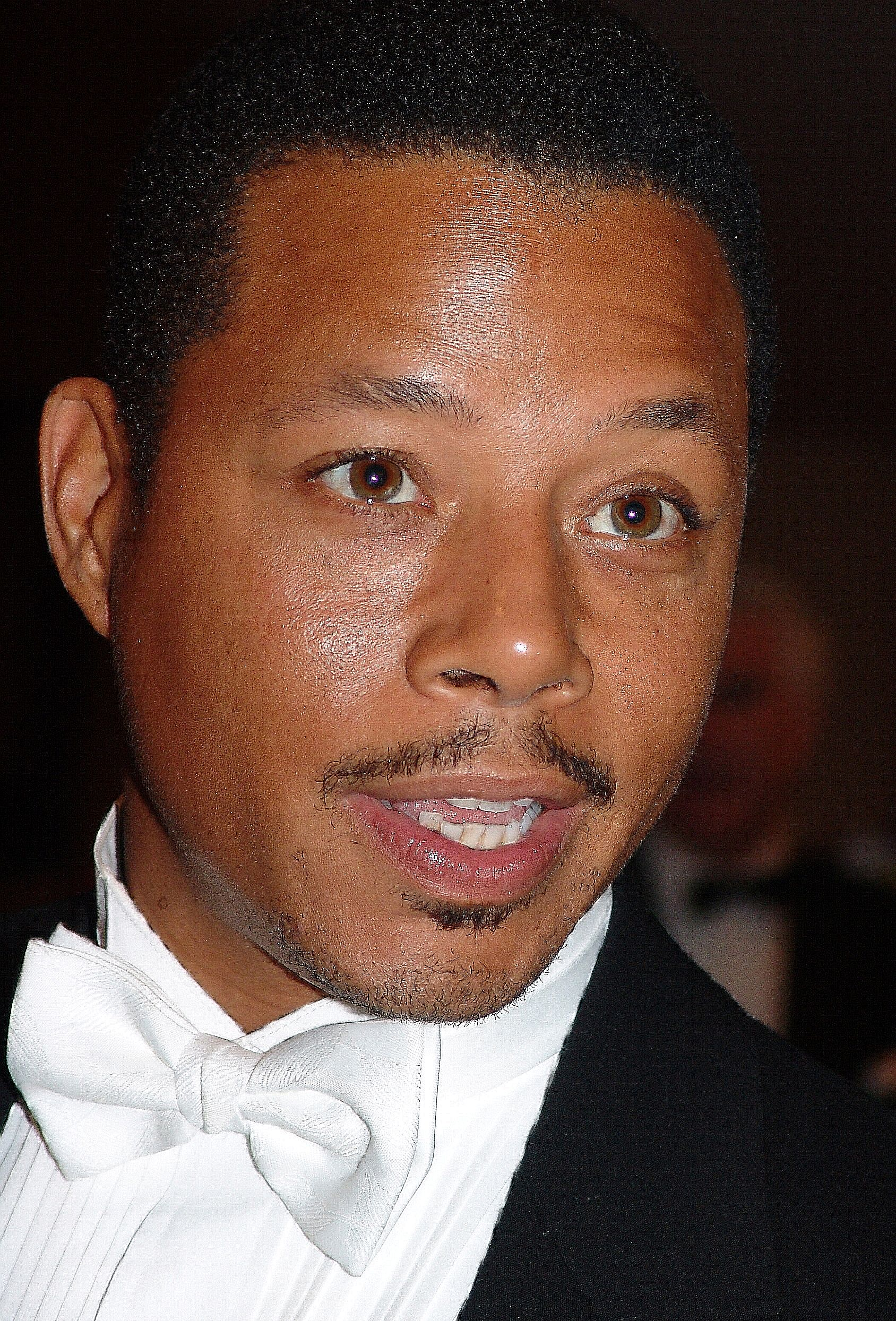
Howard in 2005

Howard has said that he looks for characters that "teach him about himself" when choosing his film roles. For the 2005 film Hustle & Flow, Howard portrayed a pimp and aspiring rapper. He performed all the character's tracks, including "It's Hard out Here for a Pimp", which won the Academy Award for Best Original Song at the 78th Academy Awards. Howard has also worked as a film producer, as when he was credited for the 2007 film Pride. In 2008, Howard hosted the PBS series Independent Lens.

Howard was contracted to play Colonel James Rhodes in the 2008 film Iron Man. Howard was signed on before any of the other major actors and was the highest paid actor in the film. He was replaced by actor Don Cheadle in the film's sequels. Entertainment Weekly reported that Howard was offered a 50 to 80 percent pay cut for Iron Man 2, though it said that it was unclear whether Howard turned down the role or whether Marvel withdrew their offer.

Howard released his debut adult alternative album, Shine Through It, in 2008 on Columbia/SME Records. He described the album as urban country, and either wrote or co-wrote all the songs on it.

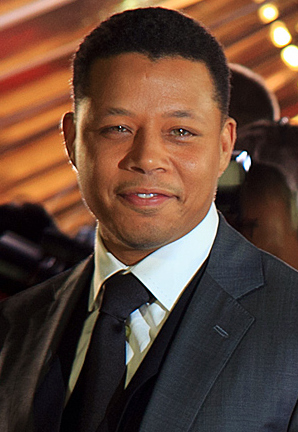
Howard at the 2011 Toronto International Film Festival

In 2008, he made his Broadway debut, playing Brick in an all-African-American production of Cat on a Hot Tin Roof, directed by Debbie Allen. During rehearsals, he allegedly attacked and seriously injured musical composer Tex Allen (brother of the director). Allen said he suffered multiple injuries and in October 2008, Allen filed a $5 million lawsuit against Howard. In 2010, Howard joined the cast of Law & Order: Los Angeles, playing Deputy District Attorney Joe Dekker. He alternated shows with Alfred Molina, who portrayed Deputy District Attorney Ricardo Morales. The series was cancelled after one season. In 2011, Howard played Nelson Mandela in the film Winnie Mandela.

From 2015 to 2020, Howard starred on the television series Empire, playing Lucious Lyon, a hip-hop mogul who discovers he is dying and must ensure the survival of his music empire. He also appeared in the television series Wayward Pines portraying Sheriff Arnold Pope, a main character in the first season in 2015 and a guest character in the second and final season.

On hosting the ninth annual Guys Choice Awards in 2015 Howard said, "I got the other guy on my side. Big Devil. Big D is my rolling buddy!". At the ceremony he was also awarded Most Dangerous Man.

In February 2021, it was announced that Howard would star in British sci-fi/thriller film Beneath. In February 2022, he was cast in the horror film Skeletons in the Closet. Howard said in December 2022 that he had retired "for the most part" two years prior and that "this is the end for me".

== Personal life ==
=== Marriages ===
As of 2007, Howard lives outside Philadelphia in Lafayette Hill, Pennsylvania. He has been married four times to three women, and has five children.

Howard married his first wife, Lori McCommas, in 1993. They had three children together, two daughters and a son. Howard has two grandchildren, a granddaughter and a grandson. Howard and McCommas' divorce was filed in 2000 and finalized in 2001, but they remarried in 2005. They subsequently filed for divorce a year later and finalized for a second time in 2007.

Howard married his second wife, Michelle Ghent, in 2010. Ghent filed for divorce in February 2011. Ghent filed for a restraining order in December 2011, accusing Howard of being physically abusive toward her. Their divorce was finalized in May 2013, though the agreement was overturned in 2015 after a judge ruled Howard had signed it under duress of Ghent threatening to sell nude pictures of Howard and other personal information.

Howard wed his third wife, model and restaurateur Miranda Pak, in late 2013. They have two sons, born 2015 and 2016. The two divorced in 2015 and then were engaged to remarry in December 2018.

=== Educational claims ===
Howard has stated that he "went to school for chemical engineering and applied materials". Though he did not complete his engineering degree, Howard says he thinks of himself as an engineer and says he intends to return one day to complete the "three credits" of which he claims he is currently short. On February 26, 2013, Howard also said on Jimmy Kimmel Live! that he had earned a PhD degree in chemical engineering from South Carolina State University (SCSU) that year. Howard never attended SCSU, and SCSU does not confer doctorates in chemical engineering. Instead, Howard was awarded an honorary degree of "Doctorate of Humane Letters" (DHL) from SCSU after speaking at its commencement ceremony in 2012.

=== Pseudoscientific theories ===
In a 2015 interview with Rolling Stone, Howard explained that he had formulated his own language of logic, which he called "Terryology", and which he was keeping secret until he had patented it. This logic language, he claimed, would be used to prove the statement "1 × 1 = 2".

"How can it equal one?" he said. "If one times one equals one that means that two is of no value because one times itself has no effect. One times one equals two because the square root of four is two, so what's the square root of two? Should be one, but we're told it's two, (Note: Note: Mathematics does not say that the square root of two is two, but an irrational number of approximately 1.41.) and that cannot be."

Howard blames his leaving the Pratt Institute over disagreements with a professor regarding this hypothesis. Howard stated he dedicates up to 17 hours daily to creating sculptures from plastic fragments joined with copper wire or solder, which he claims demonstrate his mathematical model.

In 2017, Howard published his "proof" of the claim that "1 × 1 = 2" on his Twitter account. Concerns were raised about the logical consistency of Howard's thinking.

In May 2024, Howard was a guest on The Joe Rogan Experience, where he attempted to debunk the Pythagorean theorem, claimed he can kill gravity, said he does not believe in the number zero, and claimed he remembers the events of the day he was born.

Neil deGrasse Tyson posted a video to YouTube in June 2024 responding to Terryology. Tyson stated that Howard's manifesto contained "assumptions and statements that are under-informed, misinformed, or simply false".

=== Legal issues ===
Howard was arrested in August 2000 for assaulting a Continental Airlines flight attendant after refusing her request to return to his seat because the seat belt sign was on. He was charged with assault and jailed overnight.

Howard was also arrested in 2001 for a variety of charges related to a violent attack on his estranged first wife, including assault, terroristic threats, harassment, and stalking. According to police reports, he arrived at her house after an argument on the phone, forced entry into her home by breaking in doors, and chased her into the backyard where he punched her in the face twice. The violent attack ended when Howard's brother stepped in. In 2002, he pleaded guilty to disturbing the peace.

On December 5, 2011, a judge granted Howard's then-wife Michelle Ghent a restraining order based on her claims that Howard had caused her physical injuries that required medical attention, once broke her computer in half, repeatedly threatened her, and stalked her by telephone and on the internet.

In August 2013, Ghent obtained a second restraining order against him after showing up in court with a black eye she said he gave her.

In a September 2015 interview with Rolling Stone, Howard admitted to hitting his first wife in 2001, saying: "She was talking to me real strong, and I lost my mind and slapped her in front of the kids."

== Filmography ==
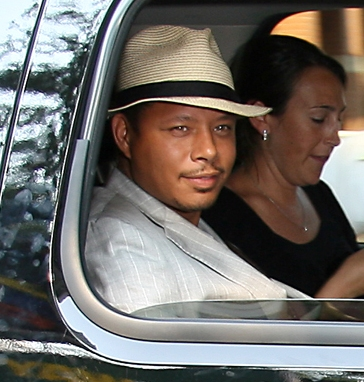
Howard at the 2007 Toronto International Film Festival

=== Film ===
Year	Title	Role	Notes
1993	Who's the Man?	Customer	
1995	Lotto Land	Warren	
1995	Dead Presidents	"Cowboy"	
1995	Mr. Holland's Opus	Louis Russ	
1996	Sunset Park	"Spaceman"	
1996	Johns	Jimmy, The Warlock	
1997	Double Tap	Ulysses	
1998	Butter	Dexter Banks	
1998	Spark	Byron	
1998	The Players Club	K.C.	
1999	Valerie Flake	The Hitchhiker	
1999	Best Laid Plans	Jimmy	
1999	The Best Man	Quentin Spivey	
2000	Big Momma's House	Lester Vesco	
2000	Love Beat the Hell Outta Me	Chris	
2001	Angel Eyes	Robby	
2001	Glitter	Timothy Walker	
2002	Hart's War	Lieutenant Lincoln A. Scott	
2002	Investigating Sex	Lorenz	
2003	Love Chronicles	"T-Roy"	
2003	Biker Boyz	"Chu-Chu"	
2004	Crash	Cameron Thayer	
2004	Ray	Gossie McKee	
2005	The Salon	Patrick	
2005	Hustle & Flow	Djay	
2005	Four Brothers	Lieutenant Green	
2005	Animal	Darius Allen	
2005	Get Rich or Die Tryin'	"Bama"	
2006	Idlewild	"Trumpy"	
2007	Pride	Jim Ellis	
2007	The Hunting Party	"Duck"	
2007	The Brave One	Detective Mercer	
2007	August Rush	Richard Jeffries	
2007	Awake	Dr. Jack Harper	
2007	The Perfect Holiday	Mr. Bah Humbug	
2008	Iron Man	Lt. Col. James "Rhodey" Rhodes	
2008	Phillies World Series Champions DVD	The Narrator	
2009	Fighting	Harvey Boarden	
2009	The Princess and the Frog	James	Voice role
2011	Little Murder (Ghost of New Orleans)	Drag Hammerman	
2011	The Ledge	Hollis Lucetti	
2011	Winnie Mandela	Nelson Mandela	
2012	Red Tails	Colonel A.J. Bullard	
2012	On the Road	Walter	
2012	The Company You Keep	Cornelius	
2013	Movie 43	Coach Jackson	Segment: "Victory's Glory"
2013	Dead Man Down	Alphonse Hoyt	
2013	House of Bodies	Starks	
2013	The Butler	Howard	
2013	Prisoners	Franklin Birch	
2013	The Best Man Holiday	Quentin Spivey	
2014	Take Me to the River	Himself	
2014	Sabotage	DEA Agent Julius "Sugar" Edmonds	
2014	Lullaby	Dr. Crier	
2014	St. Vincent	Zucko	
2016	Term Life	Sheriff Braydon	
2016	Cardboard Boxer	Pope	
2019	Gully	Mr. Christmas	
2020	Cut Throat City	The Saint	
2021	Triumph	Coach Cutting	
2022	The Walk	Lamont Robbins	
2022	The System	Bones	
2023	Showdown at the Grand	George Fuller	
2024	Skeletons in the Closet	Mark	
2024	Shirley	Arthur Hardwick Jr.	
2024	Crescent City	Brian	
TBA	The Movers	TBA	

=== Television ===
Year	Title	Role	Notes
1992	All My Children	Justin	2 episodes
1992	The Jacksons: An American Dream	Jackie Jackson	2 episodes
1993	Tall Hopes	Chester Harris	Main Cast
1994	Living Single	Brendan King	Episode: "The Hand That Robs the Cradle"
1994	Coach	Johnny Williams	Episode: "Blue Chip Blues"
1994	Family Matters	John	Episode: "Opposites Attract"
1994	Getting By	Herbert	Episode: "My Brilliant Career"
1994	Picket Fences	Malik	2 episodes
1995	The O. J. Simpson Story	Young A.C.	TV Movie
1995	New York Undercover	Buster	Episode: "Buster and Claudia"
1996–1998	Sparks	Greg Sparks	Main Cast
1998–1999	NYPD Blue	A.J. Foreman / Lonnie	2 episodes
2000	King of the World	Cassius Clay	TV Movie
2001	Boycott	Ralph Abernathy	TV Movie
2002	Fastlane	Alton White	Episode: "Things Done Changed"
2002–2003	Soul Food	Benny Jones	2 episodes
2003	Street Time	Lucius Mosley	Main Cast
2005	Their Eyes Were Watching God	Amos Hicks	TV Movie
2005	Lackawanna Blues	Bill Crosby	TV Movie
2010–2011	Law & Order: LA	Senior D.D.A. Jonah "Joe" Dekker	Main Cast
2011	Law & Order: Special Victims Unit	Senior D.D.A. Jonah "Joe" Dekker	Episode: "Reparations"
2012	Hawaii Five-0	Billy	Episode: "I Ka Wa Mamua"
2015–2020	Empire	Lucious Lyon	Main Cast
2015	Lip Sync Battle	Himself	Episodes: "Terrence Howard vs. Taraji P. Henson" pts. 1 & 2
2015–2016	Wayward Pines	Sheriff Arnold Pope	Main Cast (season 1); Recurring Cast (season 2)
2017	Philip K. Dick's Electric Dreams	George	Episode: "Real Life"
2022	The Best Man: The Final Chapters	Quentin Spivey	Miniseries, 10 episodes
2024	Fight Night: The Million Dollar Heist	Richard Wheeler	Miniseries, 8 episodes

=== Theater ===
Year	Title	Role	Venue	Ref.
2008	Cat on a Hot Tin Roof	Brick	Broadhurst Theatre, Broadway	

=== Music videos ===
Year	Title	Artist(s)	Album
2002	"Foolish"	Ashanti	Ashanti
2005	"Be Without You"	Mary J. Blige	The Breakthrough
2015	"Ghosttown"	Madonna	Rebel Heart
2020	"Never Alone" (Paul Oakenfold & Varun Remix)	Emmanuel Kelly	—N/a

=== Video games ===
Year	Title	Voice role	Notes
2008	Iron Man	USAF Lieutenant Colonel James Rhodes	

== Awards, nominations and honors ==
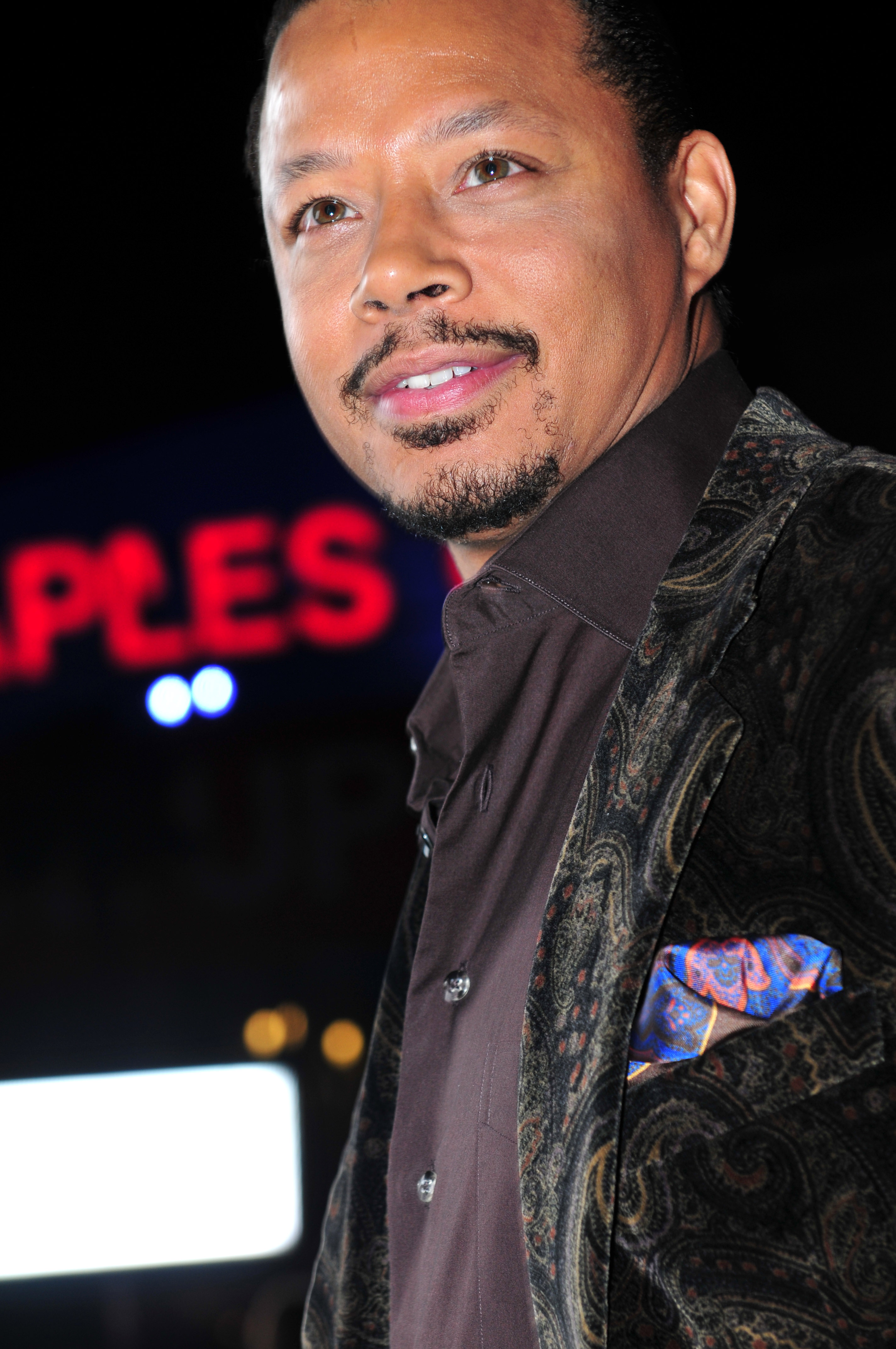
Howard at the 38th People's Choice Award (2012)

Organizations	Year	Category	Work	Result	Ref.
Academy Award	2005	Best Actor	Hustle & Flow	Nominated	
Austin Film Critics Association	2005	Breakthrough Artist	Hustle & Flow	Won	
BET Awards	2006	Best Actor	Hustle & Flow / Crash	Won	
BET Awards	2008	Best Actor	The Brave One / The Perfect Holiday	Nominated	
BET Awards	2015	Best Actor	Empire	Won	
Black Movie Award	2005	Outstanding Actor in a Supporting Role	Crash	Nominated	
Black Movie Award	2005	Outstanding Actor in a Leading Role	Hustle & Flow	Won	
Black Reel Award	1999	Best Supporting Actor	The Best Man	Nominated	
Black Reel Award	2001	Best Supporting Actor	Boycott	Won	
Black Reel Award	2005	Best Ensemble	Four Brothers	Nominated	
Black Reel Award	2005	Best Ensemble Cast	Crash	Won	
Black Reel Award	2005	Best Supporting Actor	Crash	Won	
Black Reel Award	2005	Best Ensemble Cast	Hustle & Flow	Nominated	
Black Reel Award	2005	Best Actor	Hustle & Flow	Won	
Black Reel Award	2005	Best Supporting Actor	Lackawanna Blues	Nominated	
Black Reel Award	2008	Best Supporting Actor	Iron Man	Nominated	
Chicago Film Critics Association	1999	Award for Most Promising Actor	The Best Man	Nominated	
Chicago Film Critics Association	2005	Best Actor	Hustle & Flow	Nominated	
Chicago Film Critics Association	2005	Best Supporting Actor	Crash	Nominated	
Critics' Choice Movie Awards	2005	Best Acting Ensemble	Crash	Won	
Critics' Choice Movie Awards	2005	Best Supporting Actor	Crash	Nominated	
Critics' Choice Movie Awards	2005	Best Actor	Hustle & Flow	Nominated	
Critics' Choice Movie Awards	2005	Best Song	Hustle & Flow	Won	
Florida Film Critics Circle	2005	Pauline Kael Breakout Award	Crash	Won	
Golden Globe Awards	2005	Best Actor – Motion Picture Drama	Hustle & Flow	Nominated	
Gotham Independent Film Award	2005	Breakthrough Actor	Hustle & Flow	Nominated	
Gotham Independent Film Award	2005	Best Ensemble Cast	Crash	Nominated	
Independent Spirit Award	1999	Best Supporting Male	The Best Man	Nominated	
Independent Spirit Award	2005	Best Male Lead	Hustle & Flow	Nominated	
NAACP Image Award	1999	Outstanding Supporting Actor in a Motion Picture	The Best Man	Won	
NAACP Image Award	2001	Outstanding Actor in a Miniseries or Movie	Boycott	Nominated	
NAACP Image Award	2005	Outstanding Actor in a Motion Picture	Hustle & Flow	Nominated	
NAACP Image Award	2005	Outstanding Supporting Actor in a Motion Picture	Crash	Won	
NAACP Image Award	2005	Outstanding Actor in a Miniseries or Movie	Lackawanna Blues	Won	
NAACP Image Award	2007	Outstanding Actor in a Motion Picture	Pride	Nominated	
NAACP Image Award	2010	Outstanding Supporting Actor in a Drama Series	Law & Order: LA	Nominated	
NAACP Image Award	2013	Outstanding Supporting Actor in a Motion Picture	The Butler	Nominated	
NAACP Image Award	2013	Outstanding Supporting Actor in a Motion Picture	The Best Man Holiday	Nominated	
NAACP Image Award	2015	Outstanding Actor in a Drama Series	Empire	Won	
NAACP Image Award	2016	Outstanding Actor in a Drama Series	Empire	Nominated	
NAACP Image Award	2017	Outstanding Actor in a Drama Series	Empire	Nominated	
NAACP Image Award	2022	Outstanding Actor in a Miniseries or Movie	The Best Man: The Final Chapters	Nominated	
National Board of Review	2005	Breakthrough Performance by an Actor	Crash	Won	
Online Film Critics Society	2005	Online Film Critics Society Award for Best Actor	Hustle & Flow	Nominated	
Razzie Award	2013	Worst Screen Combo	Movie 43	Nominated	
Screen Actors Guild Awards	2004	Outstanding Cast in a Motion Picture	Ray	Nominated	
Screen Actors Guild Awards	2005	Outstanding Cast in a Motion Picture	Crash	Won	
Screen Actors Guild Awards	2005	Outstanding Cast in a Motion Picture	Hustle & Flow	Nominated	
Screen Actors Guild Awards	2013	Outstanding Cast in a Motion Picture	The Butler	Nominated	
Teen Choice Award	2015	Choice Drama TV Actor	Empire	Nominated	
Teen Choice Award	2015	Choice TV Villain	Empire	Nominated	
Teen Choice Award	2015	Choice TV Chemistry	Empire	Nominated	
People's Choice Awards	2016	Favorite Dramatic TV Actor (2016)	Empire	Nominated	
People's Choice Awards	2017	Favorite Dramatic TV Actor	Empire	Nominated	
Satellite Award	2005	Best Actor – Motion Picture Musical or Comedy	Hustle & Flow	Won	
Vancouver Film Critics Circle	2005	Best Supporting Actor	Crash	Won	
Washington D.C. Area Film Critics Association	2005	Best Supporting Actor	Crash	Nominated	
Washington D.C. Area Film Critics Association	2005	Best Breakthrough Performance	Hustle & Flow	Won	
Washington D.C. Area Film Critics Association	2005	Best Actor	Hustle & Flow	Nominated	

== Discography ==
- Shine Through It (2008)
