= Harmony of Difference =

EP by Kamasi Washington
- Released: September 29, 2017
- Studios: Vox Recording Studios (Los Angeles, California)
- Genres: Jazz; contemporary jazz; progressive jazz
- Length: 31:56
- Label: Young
- Producer: Kamasi Washington

Kamasi Washington chronology
The Epic (2015)	Harmony of Difference (2017)	Heaven and Earth (2018)

Singles from Harmony of Difference
- 1. "Truth" Released: April 13, 2017; 2. "Desire" Released: September 27, 2017

Harmony of Difference is a studio EP by American jazz saxophonist and bandleader Kamasi Washington. It was released on September 29, 2017, through the Young Turks record label.

Harmony of Difference is a concept album, described as a "six-movement suite" in the liner notes. The sixth track on the album, "Truth," makes up nearly half the album's length, and combines the melodies and musical ideas from the first five tracks, tying them together in a dramatic finish.

The album received considerable acclaim from critics, and the song "Truth" made several end-of-year best-of lists.

== Critical reception ==
Professional ratings
Aggregate scores
Source	Rating
AnyDecentMusic?	7.9/10
Metacritic	81/100
Review scores
Source	Rating
All About Jazz	4.5/5 stars
AllMusic	3.5/5 stars
Clash	9/10
Exclaim!	9/10
The Guardian	2/5 stars
The Observer	4/5 stars
Paste	8.4/10
Pitchfork	8.5/10
Rolling Stone	3.5/5 stars
The Times	4/5 stars

Harmony of Difference received general acclaim by music critics upon its release. At Metacritic, which assigns a normalized rating out of 100 to reviews from critics, the album received an average score of 81, which indicates "universal acclaim", based on 13 reviews. AllMusic critic Thom Jurek praised the album for being "chock-full of refreshing, sophisticated ideas, all balanced by an emphatic inclusiveness that engages the listener at both musical and emotional levels". Mark Richardson, executive editor of Pitchfork, awarded the album the "Best New Music" tag, lauding its "tireless ambition" and "explosively grand compositions and arrangements". Nick Roseblade of Drowned in Sound had special acclaim for album closer "Truth", calling it a "stand out moment" with "infectious pop sheen", despite its length.

In a less enthusiastic review for The Guardian, critic John Lewis found all the songs on the EP to suffer from "big, blustery, banal, unsatisfyingly static melod[ies] that [are] repeated over and over and over again, restated each time by horns, guitar, strings and choir". Lewis did, however, find praise for the "impressive band, particularly drum pairing Ronald Bruner Jr and Tony Austin, who rumble away excitedly and add a Coltrane-ish intensity to proceedings".

=== Accolades ===
Publication	Accolade	Rank	Ref.
Pitchfork	The 50 Best Albums of 2017	31	

== Popular culture ==
“Truth,” the sixth and final track on the album, is featured in the final scene of the Showtime drama Homeland, as the fate of the show’s protagonist is revealed to the audience.

== Track listing ==
All tracks are written by Kamasi Washington.

No.	Title	Length
1.	"Desire"	4:37
2.	"Humility"	2:46
3.	"Knowledge"	3:52
4.	"Perspective"	3:24
5.	"Integrity"	3:47
6.	"Truth"	13:30
Total length:		31:56

== Personnel ==
- Kamasi Washington – tenor saxophone, band leader
- Miles Mosley – double bass
- Ronald Bruner, Jr. – drums
- Terrace Martin – alto saxophone on "Truth"
- Thundercat – electric bass on "Truth"
- Tony Austin – drums and percussion
- Brandon Coleman – keyboards
- Cameron Graves – piano
- Ryan Porter – trombone
- Dontae Winslow – trumpet
- Artyom Manukyan, Peter Jacobson – cello on "Truth"
- Rickey Washington – flute on "Truth"
- Matt Haze – guitar on "Truth"
- Nick Mancini – vibraphone on "Truth"
- Andrea Whitt, Molly Rogers – viola on "Truth"
- Chris Woods, Jen Simone, Paul Cartwright, Tylena Renga – violin on "Truth"
- Dr. Dawn Norfleet, Dexter Story, Dustin Warren, Jimetta Rose Smith, Mashica Winslow, Patrice Quinn, Steven Wayne, Taylor Graves, Thalma de Freitas – choir on "Truth"
- Amani Washington – painting
- Daddy Kev – mastering
