= The Proclamation =

Studio album by Kamasi Washington
- Released: January 21, 2007
- Genres: Jazz, jazz fusion, jazz-funk, avant-garde jazz
- Length: 78:53
- Label: self-released
- Producer: Kamasi Washington

Kamasi Washington chronology
Live at 5th Street Dick's (2005)	The Proclamation (2007)	Light of the World (2008)

The Proclamation is the debut studio album by American jazz saxophonist Kamasi Washington. The album was self-released on January 21, 2007.

== Track listing ==
Based on:

1. The Conception – 15:35
2. The Bombshell's Waltz – 12:01
3. Fair As Equal – 8:32
4. Whacha Say – 4:56
5. The Rhythm Changes – 8:34
6. Lonely Woman – 11:19
7. Like Someone In Love – 7:06
8. Bobby Boom Dap – 10:50

Track 6 is a cover of Ornette Coleman, while track 7 is a cover of Jimmy Van Heusen and Johnny Burke.

== Personnel ==
- Tenor saxophone – Kamasi Washington
- Acoustic bass – Miles Mosley
- Drums – Ronald Bruner Jr., Tony Austin
- Electric bass – Stephen Bruner
- Keyboards – Brandon Coleman
- Piano – Cameron Graves
- Trombone – Ryan Porter
- Vocals – Patrice Quinn
