= Heaven and Earth (Kamasi Washington album) =

Studio album by Kamasi Washington
- Released: June 22, 2018
- Studios: Electro-Vox (Los Angeles); Henson (Hollywood); Stagg Street Studios (Los Angeles)
- Genres: Jazz; jazz-funk; orchestral jazz
- Length: 183:21
- Label: Young
- Producer: Kamasi Washington

Kamasi Washington chronology
Harmony of Difference (2017)	Heaven and Earth (2018)	The Choice (2018)

Singles from Heaven and Earth
- 1. "Fists of Fury" Released: April 10, 2018; 2. "The Space Travelers Lullaby" Released: April 10, 2018; 3. "Street Fighter Mas" Released: June 20, 2018

Heaven and Earth is the fourth studio album by American jazz saxophonist Kamasi Washington. It was released on June 22, 2018, through Young Turks Recordings. Both CD and LP versions of the album contain an extra disc called "The Choice" which is hidden within a closed part of the packaging which must be cut open to access the disc. The Choice was released digitally as a separate LP on June 29, 2018.

== Critical reception ==
Professional ratings
Aggregate scores
Source	Rating
AnyDecentMusic?	8.3/10
Metacritic	86/100
Review scores
Source	Rating
AllMusic	4/5 stars
The A.V. Club	A−
Consequence of Sound	A
The Guardian	4/5 stars
The Independent	4/5 stars
The Irish Times	5/5 stars
Mojo	4/5 stars
Pitchfork	8.8/10
Q	4/5 stars
Rolling Stone	3/5 stars
Uncut	8/10

On Metacritic, which assigns a normalized rating out of 100 to reviews from critics, the album received an average score of 86, which indicates "universal acclaim", based on 22 reviews.

AllMusic critic Thom Jurek described the album as " a major dose of Afro-Futurism", and observed: "Heaven and Earth is more a refinement of the ideas expressed on The Epic than an entirely new paradigm. There is less wandering, more focus, more inquiry and directed movement, as well as an abundance of colorful tonal and harmonic contrasts. More than anything else, it establishes Washington as a composer and arranger of dizzying potential and still underscores his twin rep as a soloist and jazz conceptualist." Adam Turner-Heffer of Drowned in Sound described the album as "another incredible, mind-opening exploration into Washington’s ideas of creation in the universe".

The Guardian critic Alexis Petridis named it album of the week and wrote: "The US saxophonist has found his time and it is now: this excellent album connects politics with the jazz of the past to create an angrily inclusive new vision...On Heaven and Earth, Washington continues to explore a sweet spot between artistry and approachability. Whether his success will lead audiences to further explore music that usually exists on the fringes is an interesting question. What is more certain is the quality and accessibility of his own music". Nate Chinen of Pitchfork awarded the album "Best New Music", writing, "Far and away the strongest musical statement of his career, it’s also an exercise in contrast, if not outright contradiction ... Washington remains enamored of the jazz tradition even as he insists on reshaping it. The heart of the complaint against him in jazz circles is his limited range as an improviser. He has no real instinct for developing harmonic momentum in a solo, and he slips too often into pentatonic pattern-work, as if an algorithm were kicking in. On the other hand, Washington’s strengths have never been clearer. His sound is sinewy and centered, his rhythmic footing sure. And he’s a catharsis engine who also knows when to shrewdly dial it back"

Rolling Stone's Hank Shteamer wrote, "Washington is less a vanguardist than a crafty, retro-minded synthesist in love with a large canvas. His latest – shorter than his prior full-length, but still clocking in at close to two and a half hours – is a sprawling, eclectic set that ranges from the slightly tepid to the truly transcendent...If some tracks hit harder than others, Washington’s obsession with ear-catching detail is impressive throughout. These two discs are filled with memorable flourishes". Consequence of Sound's Tyler Clark wrote, "Kamasi Washington capitalizes on both his newfound fame and his journeyman work ethic to produce a follow-up that’s more intimate and just as daring at the same time. Listening to Heaven & Earth will give you a better sense of Washington, the man and the artist, as well as the moods and textures of the America in which he resides. It’ll also give you the chance to say you heard him when he was still, it seems, on the ascent towards the heights of his considerable powers". In The New York Times, Giovanni Rossonello wrote, "Mr. Washington still suffers gentle disdain from some in New York, where the international jazz scene is unofficially headquartered. It’s a town he’s never felt obligated to join — or to beat. A common criticism is that his music isn’t doing anything new — it’s a classic old complaint, and it doesn’t stick here ... On Heaven and Earth there’s a balance between big-stroke conceptualism — the first CD, “Earth,” is meant to represent worldly preoccupations; the second, “Heaven,” explores utopian thought — and the workmanlike reality of collaboration. The two collections don't vary significantly in terms of sound; instead, they're a testament to the sturdy rapport of Mr. Washington's ensemble, made up of Los Angeles musicians who have been playing together for years".

== Track listing ==
All tracks are written by Kamasi Washington, except where noted.

Earth
No.	Title	Writer(s)	Length
1.	"Fists of Fury"	James Wong, Joseph Koo, Ku Chia Hui (arr. Kamasi Washington)	9:42
2.	"Can You Hear Him"		8:54
3.	"Hub-Tones"	Freddie Hubbard	9:09
4.	"Connections"		8:23
5.	"Tiffakonkae"		9:24
6.	"The Invincible Youth"		9:52
7.	"Testify"	Kamasi Washington (music), Patrice Quinn & Kamasi Washington (lyrics)	5:43
8.	"One of One"		9:50
Total length:			71:06

Heaven
No.	Title	Writer(s)	Length
1.	"The Space Travelers Lullaby"		10:31
2.	"Vi Lua Vi Sol"		11:06
3.	"Street Fighter Mas"		5:57
4.	"Song for the Fallen"		12:41
5.	"Journey"	Kamasi Washington (music), Patrice Quinn (lyrics)	8:50
6.	"The Psalmnist"	Ryan Porter	7:18
7.	"Show Us the Way"		6:51
8.	"Will You Sing"		10:12
Total length:			73:32

The Choice
No.	Title	Writer(s)	Length
1.	"The Secret of Jinsinson"		8:07
2.	"Will You Love Me Tomorrow"	Gerald Goffin, Carole King (arr. Kamasi Washington)	9:40
3.	"My Family"		6:35
4.	"Agents of Multiverse"	Chris Dave, Kamasi Washington	5:22
5.	"Ooh Child"	Stan Vincent	8:53
Total length:			38:37

== Personnel ==
- Kamasi Washington – tenor saxophone
- Dontae Winslow – trumpet
- Ryan Porter – trombone
- Cameron Graves – piano
- Brandon Coleman – keyboards, organ, vocoder
- Miles Mosley – bass. electric bass
- Ronald Bruner Jr. – drums
- Tony Austin – drums, percussion
- Allakoi Peete, Kahlil Cummings – percussion
- Orchestra:
  - Rickey Washington – flute
  - Greg Martin – oboe
  - Tracy Wannomae – clarinet
  - Amber Joy Wyman – bassoon
  - Amy Sanchez, Laura Brenes – French horn
  - Marc T. Bolin – tuba
  - Jen Simone, Martino, Paul Jacob Cartwright, Ray Suen, Reiko Nakano, Rocio Marron, Yvette Devereaux, Yvette Holzwarth – violin
  - Brittany Cotto, Caroline Buckman, Chad Jackson, Landon Jones, Molly Rogers, Morgan Matadero, Tom Lea – viola
  - Adrienne Woods, Ginger Murphy, Peter PT Jacobson – cello
  - Dominic Thiroux – bass
- Dwight Trible, Matachi Nwosu, Patrice Quinn, Steven Wayne – lead vocals
- Amaya Washington, Angelo D. Johnson Jr., Cameron Graves, Dawn Norfleet, Dustin W. Warren, Jackie Fiske, Mashica Winslowdynasty, Nia Andrews, Patrice Quinn, Sonnet Simmons, Steven Wayne, Taylor Graves, Thalma de Freitas – choir
- Daddy Kev – mastering engineer

=== Additional musicians ===
- Chris Gray – trumpet
- Terrace Martin – alto saxophone
- Rickey Washington – tenor saxophone
- Jamael Dean – piano
- Carlos del Puerto – bass
- Gabe Noel – bass, electric bass
- Thundercat – electric bass
- Chris Dave, Jonathan Pinson, Robert Searight, Robert Miller – drums

== Charts ==
=== Weekly charts ===
Chart (2018)	Peak position
Austrian Albums (Ö3 Austria)	8
Belgian Albums (Ultratop Flanders)	11
Belgian Albums (Ultratop Wallonia)	29
Finnish Albums (Suomen virallinen lista)	35
French Albums (SNEP)	79
German Albums (Offizielle Top 100)	4
Italian Albums (FIMI)	61
Dutch Albums (Album Top 100)	15
Portuguese Albums (AFP)	10
Spanish Albums (Promusicae)	20
Swiss Albums (Schweizer Hitparade)	8
UK Albums (Official Charts)	13
US Billboard 200	115

=== Year-end charts ===
Chart (2018)	Position
Belgian Albums (Ultratop Flanders)	155
