= Becoming (2020 documentary film) =

2020 documentary film

- Film poster
- Directed by: Nadia Hallgren
- Produced by: Katy Chevigny; Marilyn Ness; Lauren Cioffi
- Cinematography: Nadia Hallgren
- Edited by: Erin Casper; Nathan Punwar; Aaron Wickenden
- Music by: Kamasi Washington
- Production companies: Higher Ground Productions; Big Mouth Productions
- Distributed by: Netflix
- Release date: May 6, 2020
- Running time: 89 minutes
- Country: United States
- Language: English

Becoming is a 2020 American documentary film directed by Nadia Hallgren about the former First Lady of the United States, Michelle Obama. The film was distributed on Netflix and produced by Higher Ground Productions. The documentary is partly based on her bestselling memoir of the same name, released in 2018. It was released on Netflix on May 6, 2020.

Hallgren followed Michelle Obama through her 34-city book tour after Obama's memoir Becoming was published. The documentary features footage of Obama's travels, talk-shows, and her work during her tenure as the First Lady.

== Reception ==
On review aggregator Rotten Tomatoes, the film holds an approval rating of 93% based on 74 reviews, with an average rating of 7/10. The website's critics consensus reads: "It may not get as personal as some viewers might have hoped, but Becoming offers an uplifting look at a pivotal moment in its subject's public life." On Metacritic, the film has a weighted average score of 66 out of 100, based on 18 critics, indicating "generally favorable" reviews.

In a reaction to Melania Trump's Melania (2026), streaming of Becoming rose sharply in February 2026.

=== Awards and nominations ===
Year	Award	Category	Nominee(s)	Result	Ref.
2020	Primetime Emmy Awards	Outstanding Documentary or Nonfiction Special	Lauren Cioffi, Katy Chevigny, Marilyn Ness, Priya Swaminathan and Tonia Davis	Nominated	
2020	Primetime Emmy Awards	Outstanding Directing for a Documentary/Nonfiction Program	Nadia Hallgren	Nominated	
2020	Primetime Emmy Awards	Outstanding Cinematography for Nonfiction Programming	Nadia Hallgren	Nominated	
2020	Primetime Emmy Awards	Outstanding Music Composition for a Documentary Series or Special (Original Dramatic Score)	Kamasi Washington	Nominated	
2021	Grammy Awards	Best Score Soundtrack for Visual Media	Becoming – Kamasi Washington	Nominated	
