= Kamasi Washington =

American saxophonist and bandleader (born 1981)

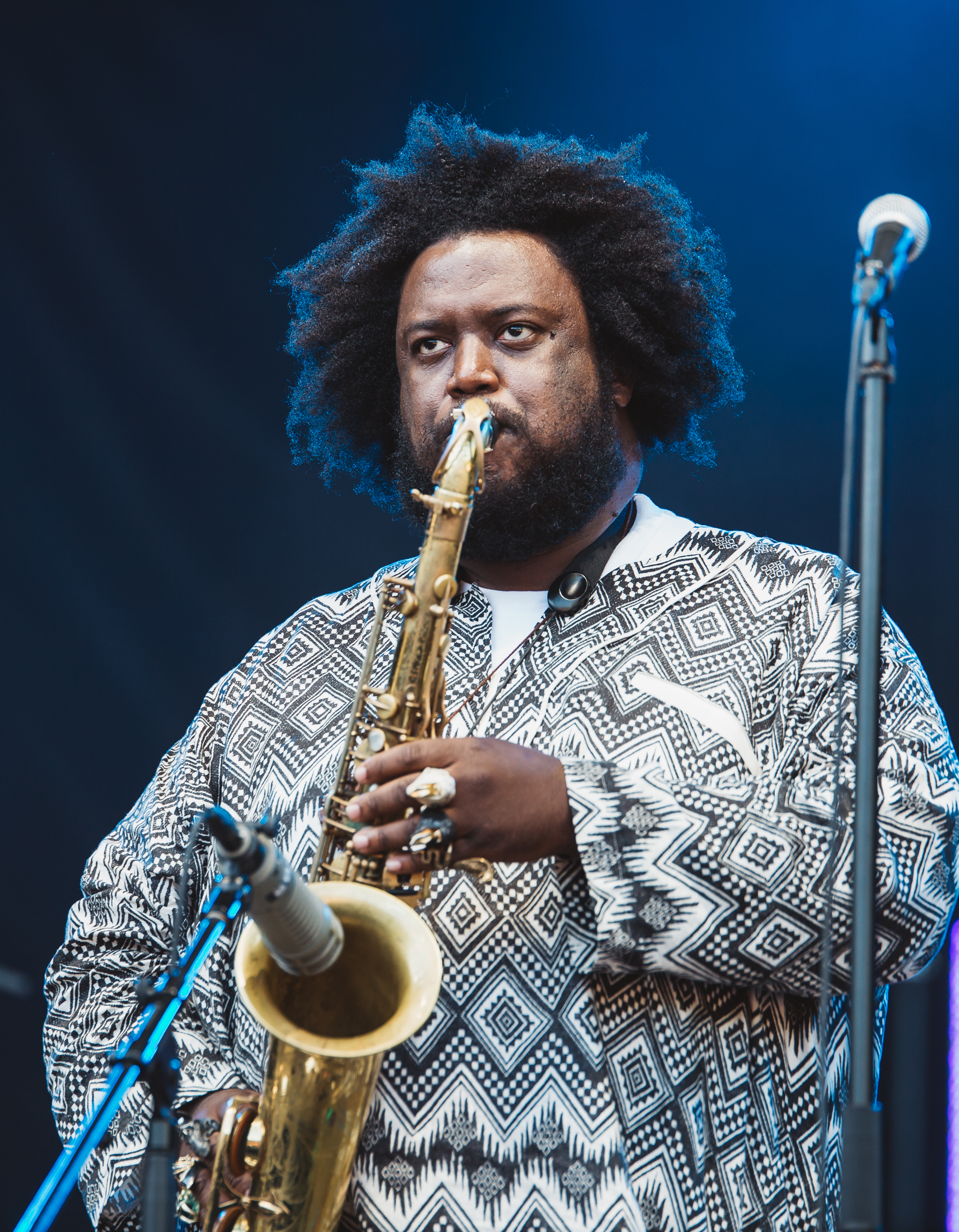
- Washington in 2017

Background information
- Born: Kamasi Tii Washington; February 18, 1981 (age 45); Los Angeles, California, U.S.
- Genre: Jazz
- Occupation: Musician
- Instrument: Tenor saxophone
- Years active: 2000–present
- Labels: Young; XL; Brainfeeder
- Member of: West Coast Get Down; Dinner Party
- Website: kamasiwashington.com

Kamasi Tii Washington (born February 18, 1981) is an American arranger, composer and jazz saxophonist. He is a founding member of the jazz collective West Coast Get Down.

== Career ==
Washington was born in 1981 and raised in Los Angeles, California. He is a graduate of the Academy of Music of Alexander Hamilton High School in Beverlywood, Los Angeles. Washington next enrolled in UCLA's Department of Ethnomusicology, where he began playing with faculty members such as Kenny Burrell, Gerald Wilson, and Billy Higgins, who mentored a quartet with Washington, pianist Cameron Graves, and the brothers Stephen ("Thundercat") and Ronald Bruner. They released their debut album Young Jazz Giants in 2004 on Birdman Records.

Washington joined the Gerald Wilson Orchestra for its 2005 album In My Time. In 2008 and 2009 "The Kamasi Washington Band" played the outdoor Labor Day Jazz Concert on the Main Green at Village Green, Los Angeles. Washington played saxophone on Kendrick Lamar's album To Pimp a Butterfly, released on March 15, 2015. Washington's debut solo recording, The Epic, was released in May 2015. Washington contributed saxophone on the Thundercat song "Them Changes", which was released on June 18, 2015, as a single from the EP The Beyond / Where the Giants Roam; the track was later included on Thundercat's full-length album Drunk (2017).

Washington released the mini-album/EP Harmony of Difference in September 2017. This was followed by his second full-length studio album, Heaven and Earth, which was released in June 2018, with a companion EP titled The Choice released a week later.

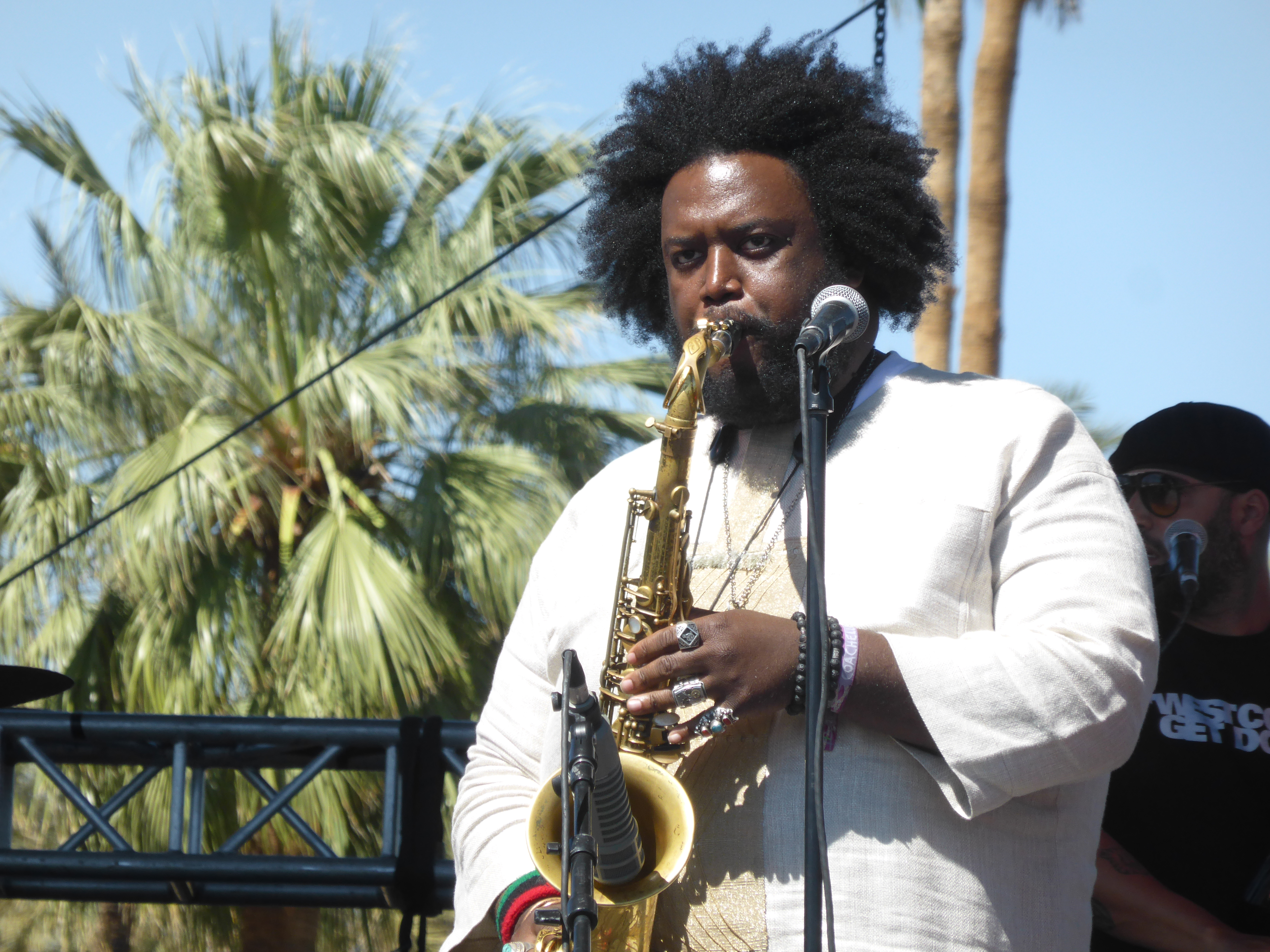
Washington at Coachella Valley Music and Arts Festival in 2016

Washington has played along with a diverse group of musicians including Wayne Shorter, Herbie Hancock, Horace Tapscott, Lauryn Hill, Nas, Snoop Dogg, George Duke, Chaka Khan, Flying Lotus, Mike Muir, Francisco Aguabella, St. Vincent, the Pan Afrikaan People's Orchestra, Run the Jewels and Raphael Saadiq.

On June 25, 2020, Washington, Terrace Martin, Robert Glasper, and 9th Wonder announced the formation of the supergroup Dinner Party. They released a single, "Freeze Tag", and their debut extended play, Dinner Party, was released on July 10, 2020.

Washington and members of West Coast Get Down were featured in the final episode of the television series Homeland in 2020.

On June 18, 2021, Washington released a new song "Sun Kissed Child" as part of The Undefeated's Music for the Movement series. Also in 2021, Washington and his band contributed a cover of the Metallica song "My Friend of Misery" to the charity tribute album The Metallica Blacklist.

On July 4, 2024, Kendrick Lamar released the music video for "Not Like Us". In the video, there was a snippet that played in the beginning of the video (later revealed to be "Squabble Up"). In the song, Kendrick mentions Washington in the line "High key; keep a horn on me, that Kamasi".

Washington, along with Bonobo and Floating Points, composed music for the 2025 Japanese anime television series Lazarus, directed by Shinichirō Watanabe. In 2026, all three collectively won "Best Original Score for Animation" at the Music Awards Japan for their work on the soundtrack.

Washington's wife is fellow jazz musician Fatima Zohra Washington, who uses the stage name Ami Taf Ra.

== Awards and nominations ==
Year	Ceremony	Category	Nominated work	Result	Ref.
1999	John Coltrane Music Competition			Won	
2015	Worldwide Winners	Album of the Year	The Epic	Won	
2016	American Music Prize		The Epic	Won	
2016	NAACP Image Awards	Outstanding Jazz Album	The Epic	Nominated	
2016	Libera Awards	Album of the Year	The Epic	Nominated	
2016	Libera Awards	Best Breakthrough Artist	The Epic	Nominated	
2016	Libera Awards	Groundbreaking Album of the Year	The Epic	Won	
2016	Libera Awards	Heritage Album of the Year	The Epic	Won	
2018	UK Music Video Awards	Best Urban Video – International	"Street Fighter Mas"	Nominated	
2018	Libera Awards	Best Jazz Album	Harmony of Difference	Won	
2019	Worldwide Winners	Jazz Album of the Year	Heaven and Earth	Won	
2019	Libera Awards	Album of the Year	Heaven and Earth	Won	
2019	Libera Awards	Best Jazz Album	Heaven and Earth	Won	
2019	Libera Awards	Creative Packaging	Heaven and Earth	Won	
2019	Libera Awards	Video of the Year	"Heaven & Earth"	Nominated	
2019	Brit Awards	International Male Solo Artist	Himself	Nominated	
2019	UK Music Video Awards	Best Alternative Video – International	"Hub-tones"	Nominated	
2019	UK Music Video Awards	Best Special Video Project	"As Told to g/d Thyself"	Nominated	
2020	Primetime Emmy Awards	Outstanding Music Composition for a Documentary; Series or Special (Original Dramatic Score)	Becoming	Nominated	
2020	Libera Awards	Best Sync Usage	Music in Apple Shot on iPhone XS commercial	Nominated	
2021	Grammy Awards	Best Score Soundtrack for Visual Media	Becoming	Nominated	
2022	Grammy Awards	Best Progressive R&B Album	Dinner Party: Dessert	Nominated	
2023	Libera Awards	Best Jazz Record	"The Garden Path"	Won	
2025	Primetime Emmy Awards	Outstanding Original Main Title Theme Music	"Vortex"	Nominated	
2026	Grammy Awards	Record of the Year	"Luther"	Won	
2026	Grammy Awards	Song of the Year	"Luther"	Nominated	
2026	Grammy Awards	Best Rap Song	"TV Off"	Won	
2026	Music Awards Japan	Best Original Score for Animation	Lazarus (with Bonobo and Floating Points)	Won	

== Discography ==
=== As leader/co-leader ===
Studio albums

- Young Jazz Giants (with Cameron Graves, Stephen Bruner, & Ronald Bruner Jr.) (Birdman, 2004)
- Live at 5th Street Dick's (self-released, 2005)
- The Proclamation (self-released, 2007)
- Light of the World (self-released, 2008)
- The Epic (Brainfeeder, 2015)
- Heaven and Earth (Young, 2018)
- Fearless Movement (Young, 2024)
- Whatchu Bringing? (Sounds of Crenshaw/Empire, 2026)

EPs

- Harmony of Difference (Young, 2017)
- The Choice (Young, 2018)
- Becoming – Music from the Netflix Original Documentary (Young, 2020)
- Dinner Party with Robert Glasper, Terrace Martin, 9th Wonder (Sounds of Crenshaw/Empire, 2020)
- Enigmatic Society with Robert Glasper, Terrace Martin, 9th Wonder (Sounds of Crenshaw/Empire, 2023)

With Throttle Elevator Music

- Throttle Elevator Music (Wide Hive, 2012)
- Area J (Wide Hive, 2014)
- Jagged Rocks (Wide Hive, 2015)
- Throttle Elevator Music IV (Wide Hive, 2016)
- Retrorespective (Wide Hive, 2017)
- Emergency Exit (Wide Hive, 2020)
- Final Floor (Wide Hive, 2021)

Soundtrack albums

- Lazarus (Adult Swim Original Series Soundtrack) (Milan, 2025)

=== As sideman ===
- Gold by Ryan Adams — on "New York, New York" and "Touch, Feel & Lose" (Lost Highway, 2001)
- Blackberry Belle by The Twilight Singers (One Little Indian, 2003)
- R&G (Rhythm & Gangsta): The Masterpiece by Snoop Dogg — on "No Thang On Me" (Geffen/Star Trak/Doggy Style, 2004)
- Searching for Jerry Garcia by Proof — on "Pimplikeness" (Iron Fist Records, 2005)
- Something Else
- Ego Trippin' by Snoop Dogg — on "Press Play" (Geffen/Doggy Style, 2008)
- The Golden Age of Apocalypse by Thundercat – on "Is It Love?" (Brainfeeder, 2011)
- Perseverance by Phil Ranelin (Wide Hive, 2011)
- DreamWeaver by George Duke – on "Stones of Orion," "Trippin'," "Ashtray," "Ball & Chain" (with Teena Marie), and "Burnt Sausage Jam" (Heads Up, 2013)
- Chameleon by Harvey Mason – on "Black Frost" (Concord, 2014)
- Up by Stanley Clarke – on "I Have Something to Tell You Tonight" (Mack Avenue, 2014)
- You're Dead! by Flying Lotus (Warp, 2014)
- To Pimp a Butterfly by Kendrick Lamar – saxophone on "u", string arrangement for "Mortal Man" (Aftermath/Interscope, 2015)
- The Beyond / Where the Giants Roam by Thundercat (Brainfeeder, 2015)
- Run the Jewels 3 by Run the Jewels – on "Thursday in the Danger Room" (Mass Appeal/RED, 2016)
- Drunk by Thundercat (Brainfeeder, 2017)
- Damn by Kendrick Lamar – strings on "Lust" (Top Dawg/Aftermath/Interscope, 2017)
- Ash by Ibeyi – on "Deathless" (XL, 2017)
- Masseduction by St. Vincent – on "Pills" (Loma Vista, 2017)
- Alone by Cory Henry – on "Operation Funk" (Culture Collective, 2022)
- No Excuses by Childish Gambino – on "Bando Stone and The New World" (Rolling Stone, 2024)
- GNX by Kendrick Lamar

With the Gerald Wilson Orchestra

- In My Time (Mack Avenue, 2005)
- Monterey Moods (Mack Avenue, 2007)
- Detroit (Mack Avenue, 2009)
- Legacy (Mack Avenue, 2011)
