= Kingsize Soundlabs =

Recording studios in Los Angeles, USA

- Company type: Recording studio
- Industry: Music
- Founder: Dave Trumfio
- Area served: Los Angeles, California, U.S.
- Key people: Dave Trumfio, Harry Trufio
- Website: kingsizesoundlabs.com

Kingsize Soundlabs is a recording studio in Los Angeles run by record producer Dave Trumfio and his brother Harry Trumfio. They have three studios in the Silverlake, Eagle Rock, and Highland Park areas of Los Angeles. The Eagle Rock studio is in the "Rock Block".

== History ==
Kingsize Soundlabs was established by Dave Trumfio in Chicago's Wicker Park area in the 1990s. He shut down his Chicago studio and moved to Los Angeles in 2000 opening there.

== Clients ==
Bands including American Standards, The Jesus and Mary Chain, Built to Spill, Wilco, The Vines, American Music Club, Patrick Park, Moving Units, Rilo Kiley, The Sleepy Jackson, The Spinto Band, Imperial Teen, Eleni Mandell, The Aggrolites, Slightly Stoopid, Los Abandoned, Lostprophets, Amateurs, Kristin Mooney, Mavis Staples, Attack Attack, Papa vs Pretty, and Letlive have recorded at Kingsize Soundlabs.

Studio B is producer Rob Schnapf's space for his "MANT studio".
