= /mu/ =

Music discussion board on 4chan

- Website type: 4chan imageboard
- Available in: English
- Owner: Hiroyuki Nishimura
- Founder: Christopher "moot" Poole
- Commercial: Yes
- Registration: Optional
- Launched: April 8, 2006; 20 years ago
- Current status: Online

/mu/ is the music board on 4chan, an English-language imageboard. Created in 2006, the board is dedicated to the discussion of music artists, albums, genres, and instruments.

Described as "4chan's best kept secret" and a "surprisingly artistic and esoteric side of 4chan", /mu/ is used by users to share their music interests with similar minds and discover "great music they would never have found otherwise" with many moments of insightful candor that can affirm or challenge their own musical tastes. The board has been noted for promoting and raising popularity for various music artists, uncovering rare and lost albums, hosting Q&A sessions, and contributing to online memes and discourse related to music.

== History and culture ==
The board has gained notoriety for earnestly focusing upon and promoting alternative, challenging, and otherwise obscure music. Some common genres discussed on /mu/ include shoegaze, experimental hip hop, witch house, IDM, midwest emo, vaporwave, and K-pop. Other discussed genres include soft rock, folk rock, bubblegum pop, baroque pop, jazz, and cumbia.

A big part of the board's culture is posting album charts, i.e., collages featuring cover art of albums that users have recently been listening to. The most discussed and essential albums on the board are referred to as "/mu/core", with common arguments being on what constitutes that list. The /mu/core list is often seen as an entry point to /mu/'s culture and music taste. Individuals with a refined music taste are referred to as "patrician". "Sharethreads" are common on the board, where users request and post links to albums on file sharing platforms, often including rare recordings or underground albums.

The board's culture has inspired many online music communities and meme pages on social media that emulate /mu/'s posting style. Artists including deadmau5, Anamanaguchi, and Andrew WK have held Q&As on the board. There is a significant overlap between user bases of /mu/ and music site Rate Your Music. According to music journalist Eden DaSilva, the board declined in popularity around 2016, following the rise of streaming services and increase in far right users on 4chan.

== Impact ==
The board has played a significant role in popularizing various music artists, as acknowledged by music publications such as Pitchfork and Entertainment Weekly, including Death Grips, Neutral Milk Hotel, Animal Collective, Car Seat Headrest, and Have a Nice Life.

Prominent music critic Anthony Fantano, described as the world's most important music critic by New York Times, began his career on /mu/ and developed a significant following there. Fantano describes /mu/ as an "original sin that all humor traces its roots to". Several musicians have acknowledged using the board to receive feedback and find inspiration. Zeal & Ardor developed their distinctive sound, which combines black metal with spirituals, based on suggestions from two /mu/ users. Classical pianist Conrad Tao has posted his music anonymously on the board for feedback and rapper JPEGMafia promoted his music on the board. Death Grips seeded various clues on /mu/ in 2012 about their then-upcoming albums The Money Store and No Love Deep Web. A rendition of the chart-topping song "Royals" by Lorde appeared on /mu/ in 2012 before its official release, although she denied ever writing on the board in 2014. An alleged unreleased Radiohead song, titled "Putting Ketchup in the Fridge" and "How Do You Sit Still", was initially reported as genuine by NME and Spin until CNN revealed it was a hoax promoted by the board's users.

Andrew W.K. did a Q&A with the board's users in 2011, causing the servers to crash from the increased traffic. In 2011, deadmau5 also held a Q&A session. In 2013, electronic musician Oneohtrix Point Never debuted on /mu/ the music video for his Still Life (Betamale), created by the visual artist Jon Rafman. In 2013, Anamanaguchi posted a Q&A thread shortly after a music video cameo appearance by 4chan founder Christopher Poole. In 2014, bassist Devin Ruben Perez of indie rock band DIIV posted in a series of Q&A threads on the board, running into controversy when the contents of his posts became public outside of /mu/. In 2015, singer Lauren Mayberry shared on Twitter a link to a thread on /mu/ about her band Chvrches' song "Leave a Trace". In 2019, Anamanaguchi had another Q&A thread.

The board has been acknowledged for sharing rare music recordings and uncovering lost albums. Notable example includes sharing the works of Duster throughout 2010s, which was a factor in their later popularity and reunion, and uncovering D>E>A>T>H>M>E>T>A>L by Panchiko (from 2000, uncovered in 2016) and All Lights Fucked on the Hairy Amp Drooling by Godspeed You! Black Emperor (from 1994, uncovered in 2022). NPR described this aspect of the board as resembling "a secret club of preservationists obsessed with the articulation of a near-dead language". "Sharethreads" are common on the board, where users request and post links to albums on file sharing platforms.

The board has attracted further attention for various projects done by its users. Users on the board sometimes recreate popular albums or create new ones collaboratively. A group called The Pablo Collective posted a 4-track remix album of Kanye West's The Life of Pablo titled The Death of Pablo to /mu/, claiming it was based on a recurring dream from one of the board's users. A role-playing game based on Neutral Milk Hotel's In the Aeroplane Over the Sea, designed with help from the board's users, received coverage from Polygon and Pitchfork.

== See also ==
- Rate Your Music – Online music and film cataloging website
- /b/ – Imageboard or online forum on 4chan
- /pol/ – Political discussion board on 4chan
- /mlp/ – My Little Pony: Friendship Is Magic discussion board on 4chan
