= LeftLion =

Arts and culture magazine covering Nottingham

- Editor: Sophie Gargett _{(June 2023 – present)}
- Editor-in-chief: Jared Wilson _{(February 2009 – present)}
- Categories: Arts and culture magazine
- Frequency: Monthly
- Total circulation: 10,000
- Founder: Jared Wilson, Alan Gilby and Tim Bates
- First issue: 1 September 2003
- Company: LeftLion Ltd
- Country: United Kingdom
- Based in: Nottingham, England, UK
- Language: English
- Website: www.leftlion.co.uk

LeftLion is a monthly arts and culture magazine and website based in Nottingham, England. The publication takes its name from a stone statue in Nottingham's Old Market Square, also known colloquially as 'the left lion', which has served as a meeting point for city residents since Nottingham Council House was built in 1929.

Originating in 2003 as a website with a focus on alternative culture, the magazine tends to be written in an informal or colloquial style, often including elements of Nottingham dialect.

== Overview and history ==
Established as a website in autumn 2003 by three childhood friends, Jared Wilson, Alan Gilby and Tim Bates, the first issue of the printed LeftLion magazine was published in 2004. For the next ten years, the printed magazine was published bi-monthly.

Following a successful crowdfunding campaign on Kickstarter, LeftLion began to be published on a monthly basis in 2014, from which time it has continued to be a monthly publication, distributed via venues, public buildings and businesses in Nottingham and Nottinghamshire. Monthly issues are often loosely themed; past themes have included the climate crisis, well-being and transhumanism.

The online magazine, which is operated concurrently to the magazine and shares many of the same articles, is updated daily. Both the website and printed magazine contain listings of upcoming events in and around the city of Nottingham.

== Contributors ==
Written and visual content in LeftLion is generally provided by a range of creatives who largely live within or have connections to the city of Nottingham, a majority of whom contribute on a voluntary basis. Past contributors have included actor Paul Kaye, musician Miles Hunt, author Nicola Monaghan, and poet and producer Henry Normal. Nadia Whittome, the MP for Nottingham East, writes a monthly column in the magazine.

The magazine is currently edited by Sophie Gargett and assistant edited by Caradoc Gayer. Previous editors have included George White, Bridie Squires, Alison Emm, Al Needham, and Jared Wilson. The magazine's artistic team is run by Alan Gilby and Natalie Owen.

== Interviewees ==
As well as engaging with local creatives and people of interest, LeftLion has often interviewed prominent national and international figures. These include: actors Bella Ramsey, Tom Blyth and Juliette Lewis; comedians Bill Bailey, Noel Fielding, Alexei Sayle, Richard Herring and Ed Byrne; musicians Public Enemy, The Prodigy, Roots Manuva, Dizzee Rascal, Sleaford Mods, Jake Bugg, Jorja Smith and Klaxons; magician Derren Brown; writers Alan Moore, Gary Younge, Alan Sillitoe, Alice Oswald and Jon McGregor; fashion designer Paul Smith; poets Andrew Motion, Benjamin Zephaniah and Henry Normal; directors Shane Meadows and Jonathan Glazer; cricket player Alex Hales; and The Sheriff of Nottingham.

LeftLion was the last publication to interview Nottingham author Alan Sillitoe and journalist Ray Gosling.

== Awards and press ==
In late 2006 and 2007, LeftLion was nominated for a series of awards including Best Free Music Magazine by Record of the Day, Ambassadors of Nottingham by BBC Radio Nottingham. The Nottingham Evening Post referred to them as "the high priests of Nottingham culture".

In 2009, LeftLion won the 'Writing and Publishing' award at the Nottingham Creative Business Awards, in a ceremony held at the Nottingham Council House on 7 October 2009. They were also runners-up for the award of Creative Business of the Year.

In 2012 The Guardian cited LeftLion as being partially responsible for an "artistic boom" in Nottingham in an interview with Game of Thrones actor Joe Dempsie who also said that the magazine "played a massive part in Nottingham's sense of creative identity."

In 2013, the publication celebrated its tenth anniversary with BBC's East Midlands Today running a feature interview, and BBC Online running a photo gallery.

In 2018 LeftLion celebrated their fifteenth birthday by releasing their 100th printed issue and then a book titled LeftLion: 100 Covers, which gathered together the cover artwork from their back catalogue.

In August 2023, LeftLion released their 20th anniversary issue, which featured several highlights of the magazine's first two decades.

== Events ==
In addition to producing written content, videos and podcasts, LeftLion frequently sponsors and runs live cultural events in Nottingham. During 2006 LeftLion worked with "A Drop In The Ocean", a citywide music festival that raised £27,200 for charity.

Musical acts and artists that have played at LeftLion events include Liam Bailey, Jake Bugg, Thepetebox, Natalie Duncan, Amusement Parks on Fire, Thepetebox, Lightspeed Champion, Love Ends Disaster!, Bent and Crazy Penis.
