= Dot to Dot Festival =

Annual British music festival

Dot To Dot Festival
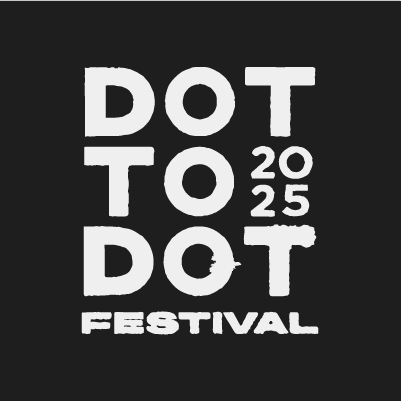
- The 2025 Dot To Dot Festival logo
- Genre: Indie, electro, alternative
- Dates: Spring Bank Holiday Weekend
- Locations: Nottingham, Bristol, and Manchester, UK
- Years active: 2005 – present
- Founders: Daybrook House Promotions
- Website: dottodotfestival.co.uk

The Dot To Dot Festival is an annual music festival taking place since 2005, currently held at various venues in Nottingham, Bristol and previously Manchester across May bank holiday weekend.

Previous artists that have performed at the festival include Dua Lipa, Ed Sheeran, Florence & The Machine, Lewis Capaldi, London Grammar, Wolf Alice, Years & Years, Beach House, Catfish and The Bottlemen, Fontaines D.C., Ghetts, Metronomy and many more.

Unlike weekend music festivals such as the Reading and Leeds Festivals, there is no artist rotation – all artists play one city the first day and travel to the other for the following day.

The festival has just announced artists for their 2025 event include The Horrors, Fat Dog, SPRINTS, Big Special, Kate Bollinger, Låpsley, Honeyglaze and more, all set to head to Bristol on 24th May 2025 and Nottingham on 25th May 2025.

== History ==
=== 2025 Event ===
Dot To Dot Festival 2025 took place in Bristol on 24 May and Nottingham on 25 May.

The 2025 line-up included FAT DOG, Sprints, The Horrors, Westside Cowboy, Big Special, Jimothy Lacoste, Lord Apex, Snooper, Master Peace, Sextile, Jasmine.4.t, Kate Bollinger and many more.

=== 2024 Event ===
Dot To Dot Festival 2024 took place in Bristol on 25 May and Nottingham on 26 May.

The 2024 line-up included Jockstrap, Wunderhorse, The Magic Gang, Antony Szmierek, Abby Sage, Bleach Lab, The Bug Club, Charlotte Plank, The Dare, Hovvdy, Infinity Song, Jianbo, Jgrrey, LEN, Oscar #Worldpeace, Panic Shack, Pastel, Picture Parlour, Tim Atlas and many more.

=== 2023 Event ===
Dot To Dot Festival 2023 took place in Bristol on 27 May and Nottingham on 28 May.

The 2023 line-up included Yard Act, Alvvays, The Murder Capital, Finn Foxell, Kofi Stone, Yune Pinku, Hamish Halk, High Vis, 86TVs, Grove, BEKA, Fat Dog, Cryalot, Opus Kink, Nieve Ella and many more.

=== 2022 Event ===
Dot To Dot Festival 2022 took place in Bristol on 28 May and Nottingham on 29 May.

The 2022 line-up included Squid, Ghetts, Frankie Stew & Harvey Gunn, Baby Queen, Alfie Templeman, Cassia, NiNE8 COLLECTIVE, Jane Weaver, Just Mustard, Jockstrap, Everyone You Know, Bob Vylan, Swim Deep & many more.

=== 2021 Event ===
Dot To Dot Festival 2021 took place in Bristol on 25 September and Nottingham on 26 September.

The 2021 line-up included Sports Team, Palace, Gilla Band, Black Honey, Snapped Ankles, Billie Marten, Rachel Chinouriri, Do Nothing, Sam Wise, Steam Down, Oscar Lang, Chubby And The Gang, Yard Act, Low Island, and loads more.

=== 2020 Event ===
Dot To Dot Festival 2020 was set to take place in Manchester on 22 May, Bristol on 23 May and Nottingham 24 May, but was cancelled due to COVID-19 measures.

The 2020 line-up was set to include Easy Life, Steam Down, Skinny Living, Alexandra Savior, Chartreuse, Drug Store Romeos, Gracey, Taylor Janzen, PIST Idiots, Aaron Smith and loads more.

=== 2019 Event ===
The 2019 festival took place in Manchester on 24 May, Bristol on 25 May and Nottingham 26 May

The 2019 line-up includes Crystal Fighters, Jordan Rakei, Swim Deep, The Night Cafe, Dream Wife, The Orielles Lauren Aquilina, Viagra Boys, Mini Mansions, Fatherson and loads more.

=== 2018 Event ===
The 2018 festival took place in Manchester on 25 May, Bristol on 26 May and Nottingham 27 May

The 2018 line-up includes The Horrors, Dermot Kennedy, Pale Waves, Marika Hackman, Mahalia, Turnover, The Snuts, Bad Sounds, Gus Dapperton, The Regrettes, Cassia, [Desperate Journalist], Our Girl, Vistas and loads more.

=== 2017 Event ===
The 2017 festival took place in Manchester on 26 May, Bristol on 27 May and Nottingham 28 May

The 2017 line-up included Sundara Karma, Amber Run, The Growlers, Pinegrove, Honeyblood, Louis Berry, The Big Moon, Tom Grennan, The Night Cafe, Cherry Glazerr, Picture This and loads more.

=== 2016 Event ===
The 2016 festival took place in Manchester on 23 May, Bristol on 24 May and Nottingham 25 May

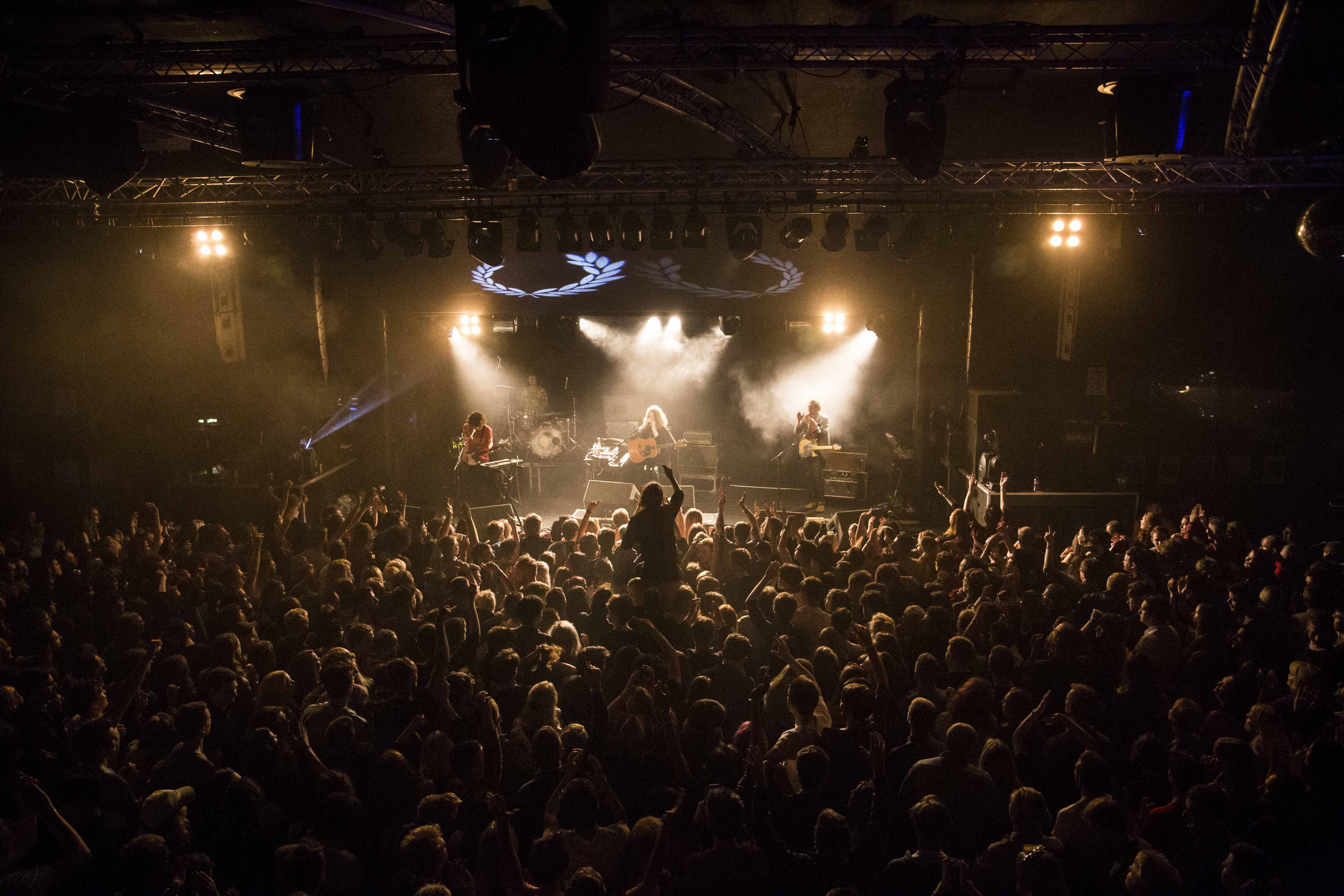
Mystery Jets headlining Rock City, Nottingham during Dot to Dot 2016

The 2016 line-up included Mystery Jets, Augustines, The Temper Trap, Spring King, Rat Boy, Dua Lipa, Sundara Karma, The Sherlocks, Lauren Aquilina and loads more.

=== 2015 Event ===
The 2015 festival took place in Manchester on 22 May, Bristol on 23 May and Nottingham 24 May

The 2015 line-up included Saint Raymond, Swim Deep, Rae Morris, Fat White Family, Best Coast, Rhodes, Prides and loads more.

=== 2014 Event ===
The 2014 festival took place in Manchester on 23 May, Bristol on 24 May and Nottingham 25 May

The 2014 line-up included Peace, The Midnight Beast, Catfish and the Bottlemen, Courtney Barnett, Wolf Alice, Saint Raymond, Real Estate, The Pizza Underground and loads more.

=== 2013 Event ===
The 2013 festival took place in Manchester on 24 May, Bristol on 25 May and Nottingham 26 May

The 2013 line-up included Dry The River, Tom Odell, Benjamin Francis Leftwich, Lucy Rose, The 1975, London Grammar, Swim Deep, Little Green Cars and loads more.

=== 2012 Event ===
The 2012 festival was held over the extended Queen's Jubilee Bank Holiday weekend from 2–4 June.

The 2012 line-up was headlined by The Drums, previous recipients of NME's Philip Hall Radar Award, and Pulled Apart By Horses, the Leeds post-hardcore four-piece described by The Observer as "the best live band in Britain." Also on the bill were Willy Mason, Nottingham art-pop quintet Dog Is Dead, Summer Camp, Lucy Rose, Kyla La Grange, Deaf Club, Clock Opera, Thepetebox, Ryan Keen, Broken Hands, Dirty Goods, Pearl & The Beard, Vadoinmessico and Wonder Villains.

Venues:

Manchester, 2 June: HMV Ritz, Deaf Institute, Sound Control, Joshua Brooks, Zoo
Bristol, 3 June: O2 Academy, Thekla, Louisiana, Trinity, Fleece, Start The Bus, The Cooler, Stag & Hounds
Nottingham, 4 June: Rock City, Rock City Basement, Rescue Rooms, Stealth, Bodega, Jongleurs

=== 2011 Event ===
The 2011 festival was a continuation of the three city/three-day routine from 2010. Tickets ranged from £20 – £25 depending on location.

Acts announced to play the festival were: Hurts, Darwin Deez (Manchester Exclusive), Ed Sheeran, We Are Scientists, Guillemots, The Naked and Famous, The Joy Formidable, SBTRKT, Dananananaykroyd, Wolf Gang, Totally Enormous Extinct Dinosaurs, Benjamin Francis Leftwich, Braids, Cults, Hyetal and many more.

=== 2010 Event ===
Less than a week after the 2009 event, Dot to Dot's return in 2010 was confirmed with a limited release of early bird tickets on sale 29 May 2009.

2010 saw the first year in which the festival was held in Manchester as well as Bristol and Nottingham.

Artists who played included: Mystery Jets, Los Campesinos!, Ellie Goulding, Beach House, Zane Lowe, Liars, Blood Red Shoes, Washed Out, Jakwob and Wild Beasts amongst others.

=== 2009 Event ===
The annual event showcased up and coming bands and DJs from the UK and international scenes offering two days of indie, rock, dance and pop music. As with previous years the festival concentrated on the musical epicentres of each city across a number of venues of differing sizes.

Tickets for the 2009 event – which took place on 23 and 24 May 2009 – were released on 23 January 2009.

Artists scheduled to perform include Annie Mac, Friendly Fires, Ladyhawke, Cage the Elephant, Little Boots, Brodinski, 65 Days of Static, The Big Pink, Marina and the Diamonds and Patrick Wolf,

The 2009 festival did not operate in London, but continued with the same venues in Nottingham and Bristol.

=== 2008 Event ===
In 2008, the festival operated a third location in Shoreditch, London, known as Hox to Dot. This leg catered for the more electronic extreme of the indie music spectrum, hosting DJs and turntablists. For this reason, there was no real crossover between artists at the London leg with either Nottingham or Bristol. Additionally, Hox to Dot operated on a Thursday (as opposed to a two-day, weekend festival).

Venues in Nottingham were Rock City, Nottingham Trent University, The Rescue rooms, Stealth and The Bodega Social Club. Bristol hosted performances in the Academy, The Thekla, the Fleece, the Louisiana, the Trinity Centre and Fiddlers club. London used venues such as Catch, Electricity Showroom Basement, Hoxton Bar & Kitchen, The Macbeth, and The Old Blue Last.

The 2008 festival included such acts as Get Cape. Wear Cape. Fly., Dirty Pretty Things, Spiritualized Mystery Jets, Glasvegas, Alphabeat, Bloc Party, Hercules and Love Affair, Two Gallants, Noah and the Whale, Ladyhawke, Metronomy, Rolo Tomassi and The Holloways. The London leg featured live sets from Juiceboxxx, Cutting Pink With Knives and various DJ sets.

=== 2007 event ===
2007 was the first year that Dot to Dot operated in Bristol as well as Nottingham. It took place on Bank Holiday Sunday 27 May at The Rescue Rooms, Rock City, The Social, Stealth, Notts Trent University and The Old Angel in Nottingham as well as Thekla Social, Louisiana and Fiddler's in Bristol on Bank Holiday Saturday 26 May. Both events went on from 1 pm to 5 am.

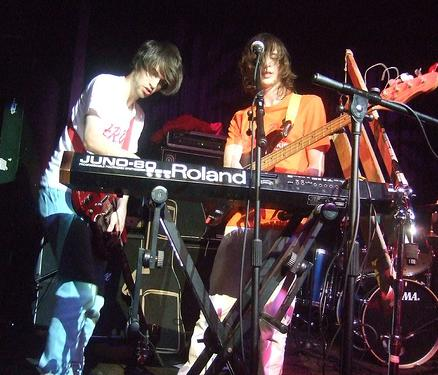
Late of the Pier at Dot to Dot, Bristol 2007

The 2007 event included acts such as The Cribs, New Young Pony Club, Kate Nash, Annuals, Erol Alkan, Kano, Chromeo, Late of the Pier, Gallows, Laura Marling and Blonde Redhead, with tickets priced at £22.50 (all venues) or £20 for 14+ venues only.

=== 2006 Event ===
With over 50 DJs plus bands such as British Sea Power and Bromheads Jacket, at four venues across the city of Nottingham, the event ran from 1 pm until 4 am over May Bank Holiday Sunday. The chosen venues are Stealth, Rock City, The Social and the Rescue Rooms. Tickets were priced at £12.50. The event had stalls and visual activities as well as live music acts across all venues.

Dot to Dot Festival was held in Nottingham at The Bodega (Formerly The Social) Stealth, Rescue Rooms and Rock City.

The 2006 event included acts such as British Sea Power, Mystery Jets, The Long Blondes, Buck 65, Metronomy, Klaxons, The Automatic, The Horrors, Get Cape. Wear Cape. Fly, MSTRKRFT and Simian Mobile Disco.

=== 2005 Event ===
The event took place on Bank Holiday Sunday 29 May 2005 and tickets were priced at £12.

Dot to Dot Festival started in Nottingham. It took place across three venues; Rescue Rooms, The Bodega (Formerly The Social) and Stealth

The 2005 event included acts such as Ladytron, Radio 4 Simian Mobile Disco and The Rakes.

== Awards and nominations ==
=== UK Festival Awards ===
| Year | Category | Work | Result | Ref. |
|---|---|---|---|---|
| 2017 | Best Festival for Emerging Talent | Dot to Dot Festival | Won | |
| 2023 | Best Metropolitan Festival | Dot to Dot Festival | Won | |
