= City of Glass =

City of Glass may refer to:

== Geography ==
- Vancouver, British Columbia, Canada
- Westland (region), Netherlands because of the many greenhouses in the region

== Literature ==
- City of Glass (Paul Auster book), a 1985 novel by Paul Auster
  - City of Glass (comics), a 1994 graphic novel adaptation by Paul Karasik and David Mazzucchelli
- City of Glass (Coupland book), a 2000 non-fiction book by Douglas Coupland
- City of Glass (Clare novel), a 2009 young adult book by Cassandra Clare
- The City in Glass, a 2024 fantasy novel by Nghi Vo

== Film ==
- City of Glass (film), a 1998 film directed by Mabel Cheung
- City of Glass (TV series), a 2008 South Korean TV series

== Music ==
- City of Glass (Stan Kenton album), a 1951 album
  - "City of Glass", a jazz composition by Robert Graettinger featured on the above album
- City of Glass, a 2010 album by the alternative rock band Love Ends Disaster!
