= Swimming (band) =

British art-rock band

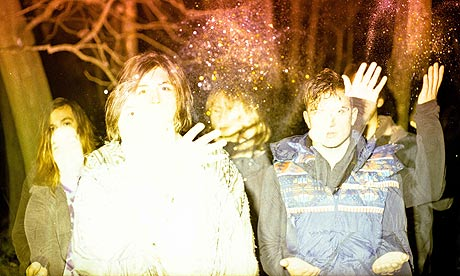

Background information
- Origin: Nottingham, England
- Genres: Art rock; synthpop; ambient; neo-prog
- Years active: 2004–2013
- Labels: Tummy Touch (UK / US); EVR (US); Colourschool (UK); Izumi (UK)
- Members: John Sampson; Pete Sampson; Joff Spittlehouse; Blake Pearson; Sam Potter
- Past members: Andrew Wright; Benjamin Hallatt
- Website: swimmingband.com

Swimming was an English art rock band formed in Nottingham, England, known for their genre-straddling output that unites a fluid and experimental sonic approach into a sound which is uniformly uplifting. They have releases on their own Colourschool Records, EVR Records and Tummy Touch Records.

== History ==
Swimming as a coherent experimental project emerged in 2004 as a result of previous years of dedicated writing sessions between John Sampson and Benjamin Hallatt. The duo developed the band's fluid and diverse conceptual style in writing and producing the material heard on debut EP, Pacific Title. The E.P. was completed with John's brother Pete on drums, as well as Andrew Wright on keyboards. Pacific Title was released on Izumi Records in 2006. Hallatt left the 'live' band line up shortly after the E.P.'s completion but contributed to Swimming's 'Primary' EP in 2008 and debut album, 'The Fireflow Trade' in 2009. The new incarnation of Swimming, set about developing the fluid conceptual groundwork in an increasingly 'song based', direction, gaining praise in the popular indie music and mainstream press for their original approach. The second EP Primary was released, again through Izumi Records, in 2008 as well as two singles, Panthalassa and Tigershark that got their first national airplay on BBC Radio 1, XFM and heavy rotation on NME Radio. The band recruited a second guitarist, Jonathon "Joff" Spittlehouse and bass player Blake Pearson (aka G KOKO) and supported Chairlift, Pivot (PVT), Shearwater as well as their first festival appearances at Glastonbury and a world first fully binaural, headphone only gig with sonic artist Dallas Simpson at Dot to Dot Festival 2008.

The band's self-produced debut album The Fireflow Trade came out in May 2009 on their own label, Colourschool Records. Having a sound that proved hard to define, the band evoked comparisons to well over 50 different artists in the press around the release of the album. The Fireflow Trade was included in many best of-2009 lists including number 21 in The Fly Magazine.

The band toured Europe in Oct 2010 and signed to Tim 'Love' Lee's Tummy Touch Records the same month. The track "Sun In The Island" was the first single off their second album, Ecstatics International, and was chosen to be the first release on New York's East Village Radio's new singles club, EVRRecords in March 2011.

Ecstatics International was released in November 2011 in the UK to more critical acclaim through Tummy Touch Records; described as "...a near faultless, cliché-free exploration of contemporary synth pop" and made it into the top 10 debuts of the year in Clash Magazine.

In 2013, Swimming produced the soundtrack to the short film, Beyond The Scars, about surfing in the exposed, freezing corners of the North Sea. It was commissioned by and screened on Channel 4's Shooting Gallery, in February 2013.

== Binaural Recordings ==
Swimming and Dallas Simpson have collaborated on a series of live recordings and performances. Many of these are available online as videos and in 2011 they produced a short documentary with award-winning director Simon Ellis called Swimming: Beach which premiered at the 8th Berlin International Directors Lounge in February 2012. The band have recorded in various outdoor environments to match the songs they record. They have also given select live performances to diverse audiences from cinemas, art spaces, festivals and more conventional venues. This setup has picked up the attention of Sound On Sound magazine, who ran an in-depth feature in their February 2012 issue.

Binaural Recordings/Films:

2007: "Swimming: Woods" - remix of Tigershark remix at Ambergate, Derbyshire, UK
2009: "Swimming: Skyspace" live version of Sun In The Island in Skyspace, Kielder, Northumberland, UK
2011: "Swimming: Beach" Documentary of binaural recordings at Bamburgh Beach, Northumberland, UK

== Associated acts ==
Swimming's core original member, Benjamin Hallatt, has produced a wealth of minimalist abstracted sound work independently of his time with the Swimming project. Documented works date back to 2004 with an obscure 7" vinyl pressing under the moniker SCKE// with further works and live performances dating to 2015 with various solo projects and collaborations. Notably in early 2015, Hallatt supported Russell Haswell and Painjerk on a rare collaborative performance, as well as accompanying Rudolf Eber on the 2015 Crater Lake Festival bill.

Before joining Swimming, keyboardist Andrew Wright played guitar for Nottingham indie rock band Panchiko, where he eventually returned a decade later.

Before joining Swimming, keyboardist Sam Potter was a member of Castle Donington band Late of the Pier.

== Discography ==
=== Albums ===
Date of Release	Title	Track listing	Label
11 May 2009	The Fireflow Trade	1. Panthalassa; 2. Tigershark; 3. 9:Skopen; 4. Ease Down The River; 5. Crash The Current; 6. Crescents; 7. Eagle Aviary; 8. All In Time To The Shoreline; 9. The Fireflow Trade	Colourschool Records
7 November 2011	Ecstatics International	1. Neutron Wireless Crystal; 2. In Ecstatics; 3. Mining For Diamonds; 4. Kid Global; 5. I Do (Come True); 6. Sun In The Island; 7. Fire At Blue Point; 8. Beat Beat of Your Heartbeat; 9. Classic 1001 Dreams; 10. All Things Made New (Stand); 11. Team Jetsream	Tummy Touch Records

=== Singles/EPs ===
Date of Release	Title	Label
5 March 2006	"Pacific Title EP"	Izumi Records
15 June 2007	"Tigershark"	Izumi Records
9 Sep 2008	"Primary" EP	Izumi Records
15 June 2009	"Panthalassa" / "Crash The Current"	Colourschool Records
7 March 2011	"Sun In the Island"	EVR Records
17 October 2011	"Neutron Wireless Crystal"	Tummy Touch
14 May 2012	"All Things Made New (Stand)"	Tummy Touch

== Band members ==
=== Current members ===
- John Sampson (lead vocals)
- Peter "Pete" Sampson (drums)
- Jonathon "Joff" Spittlehouse (guitar)
- Blake Pearson (bass)
- Sam Potter (keyboards, sampler)

=== Former members ===
- Alex Tabrizi (bass)
- Benjamin "Ben" Hallatt (founding member, guitar, various instruments) (2004–2006, 2008–2009)
- Andrew Wright (keyboards, sampler, vocals)

=== Touring members ===
- Michael Feerick (drums)
