= Failed at Math(s) =

Studio album by Panchiko
- Released: 5 May 2023
- Recorded: 2001 (Note: ”Until I Know”, “Gwen Everest”, “Rocking With Keith”, and “Think That’s Too Wise” were all recorded in 2001 and were released on the compilation album, Ferric Oxide (Demos 1997-2001) as unfinished demos.), 2023
- Genres: Indie rock; trip hop; electronic
- Length: 25:57
- Label: Self-released
- Producer: Panchiko

Panchiko chronology
Live in Nottingham (2022)	Failed at Math(s) (2023)	Ginkgo (2025)

Singles from Failed at Math(s)
- 1. "Failed at Math(s)" Released: 8 March 2023; 2. "Until I Know" Released: 30 March 2023; 3. "Portraits" Released: 12 April 2023

Failed at Math(s) is the debut studio album by British indie rock band Panchiko. The album was self-published by the band on 5 May 2023. The album consists of the first new material recorded by the band since their reunion after the discovery of their debut EP, D>E>A>T>H>M>E>T>A>L.

== Background ==
Panchiko had originally consisted of four friends who recorded a variety of EPs and had disbanded quickly after in 2000. In 2020, the band decided to reform after the successful search for their debut EP, D>E>A>T>H>M>E>T>A>L, where a copy had originally been found in a charity shop.

Failed at Math(s) was announced on 13 February 2023. Three singles were issued for the album; "Failed at Math(s)", which was released on 8 March; "Until I Know", released on 30 March; and "Portraits", released on 12 April. Music videos for the singles, as well as for the track "Gwen Everest", were released on the band's YouTube channel. The artwork for the release and its music videos was created by Japanese painter Shunsaku Hayashi. (Note: credited by the band on their Bandcamp page and on physical releases.)

== Composition ==
"Specific conditions were cultivated in order to recreate the writing process of 20 years ago: sat on the sofa, surrounded by snacks, games consoles; music machines were sampled, lyrics mumbled, and three chord progressions were strummed over drum loops and blips and bloops."

— Andy Wright, May 2023

Failed at Math(s) has been described as indie rock, trip hop and electronic. Some of the tracks on the album, such as "Until I Know", "Gwen Everest", "Think That's Too Wise" and "Rocking with Keith" were the product of reworked demos previously recorded by the band before they disbanded. These demos were released on the compilation album, Ferric Oxide (Demos 1997–2001).

The opening track "Failed at Math(s)" was described as a lo-fi track containing "sparkling synth, grungy atmospheric beats and distorted vocals". Andy Wright, a band member of Panchiko, explained in an interview that the track is about breaking free from habits in order to improve oneself. The track "Portraits" was described as a dark and mellow track with ambient instrumentals. Owain Davies, the lead singer of the band, discussed how the song "covers feelings of pressure and tackling things on your own".

The track "Gwen Everest" contains lyrics about watching a loved one make poor choices, and seeing the consequences take place. The track was one of the reworked demos previously recorded by the band. The closer for the album, "Rocking with Keith" was another reworked demo and was described as "[boasting] a prominent piano feature and clocks in at over five and a half minutes long". According to Davies, the track was originally recorded on an Akai DPS12 multi-tracker.

== Release ==
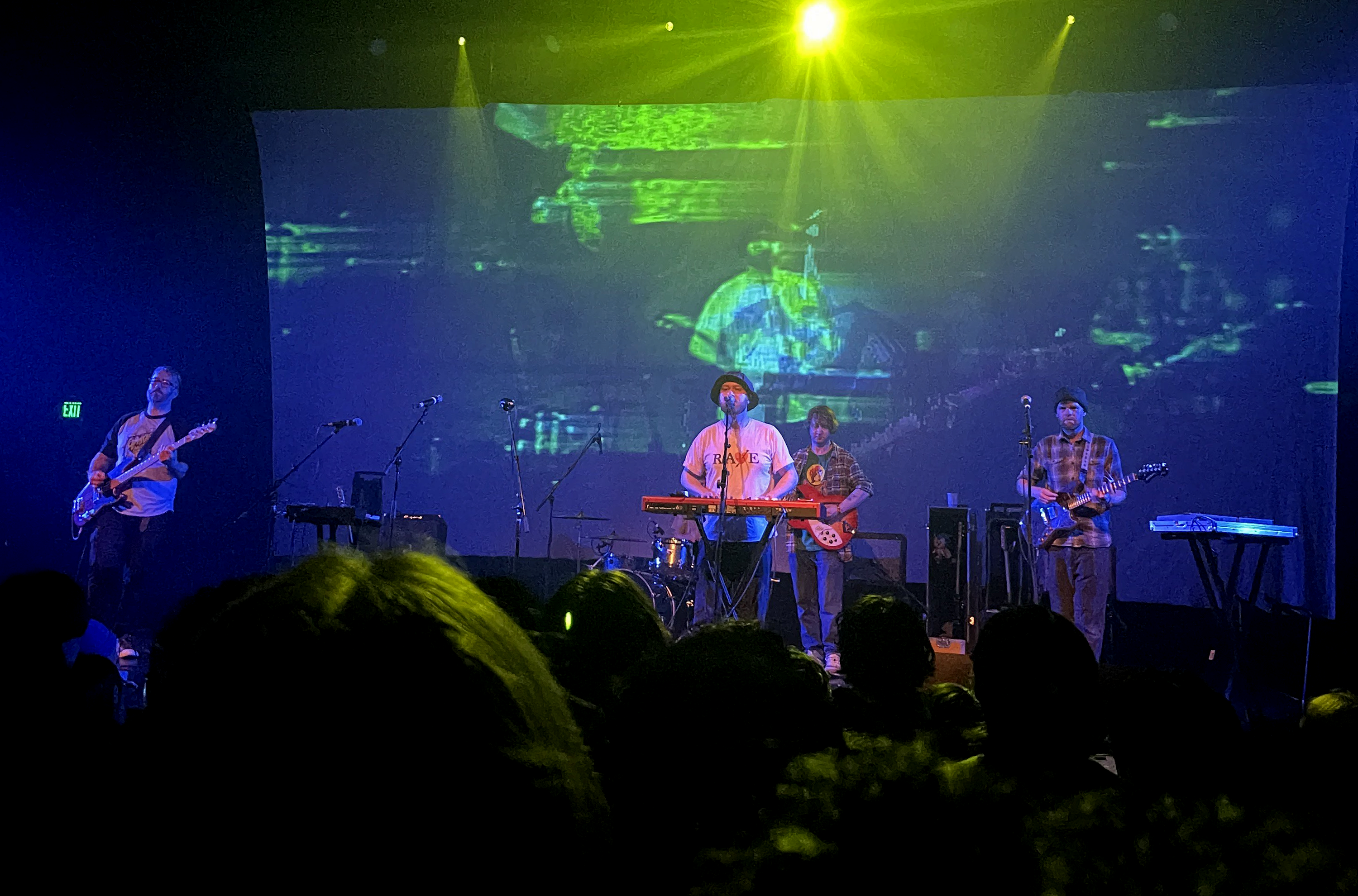
Panchiko playing live on the Failed at Math(s) tour

Failed at Math(s) was released on 5 May 2023 on CD, LP and digital services. The album marked the first new material from the band in 23 years, and their first studio album altogether.

To coincide with the release of the album, the band embarked on a tour across the United States with supporting bands Horse Jumper of Love and LSD and the Search for God, which later expanded into the UK and Europe. This tour commenced on 5 May in Seattle, and concluded on 1 December in Bologna.

== Track listing ==
All tracks written and produced by Panchiko.

Failed at Math(s) track listing
No.	Title	Length
1.	"Failed at Math(s)"	2:40
2.	"Portraits"	3:42
3.	"Until I Know"	3:23
4.	"Breakfast Séance"	2:50
5.	"Find It (A Song)"	2:17
6.	"Gwen Everest"	3:04
7.	"Think That's Too Wise"	2:25
8.	"Rocking with Keith"	5:36
Total length:		25:57
