= Panchiko =

British indie alternative rock band

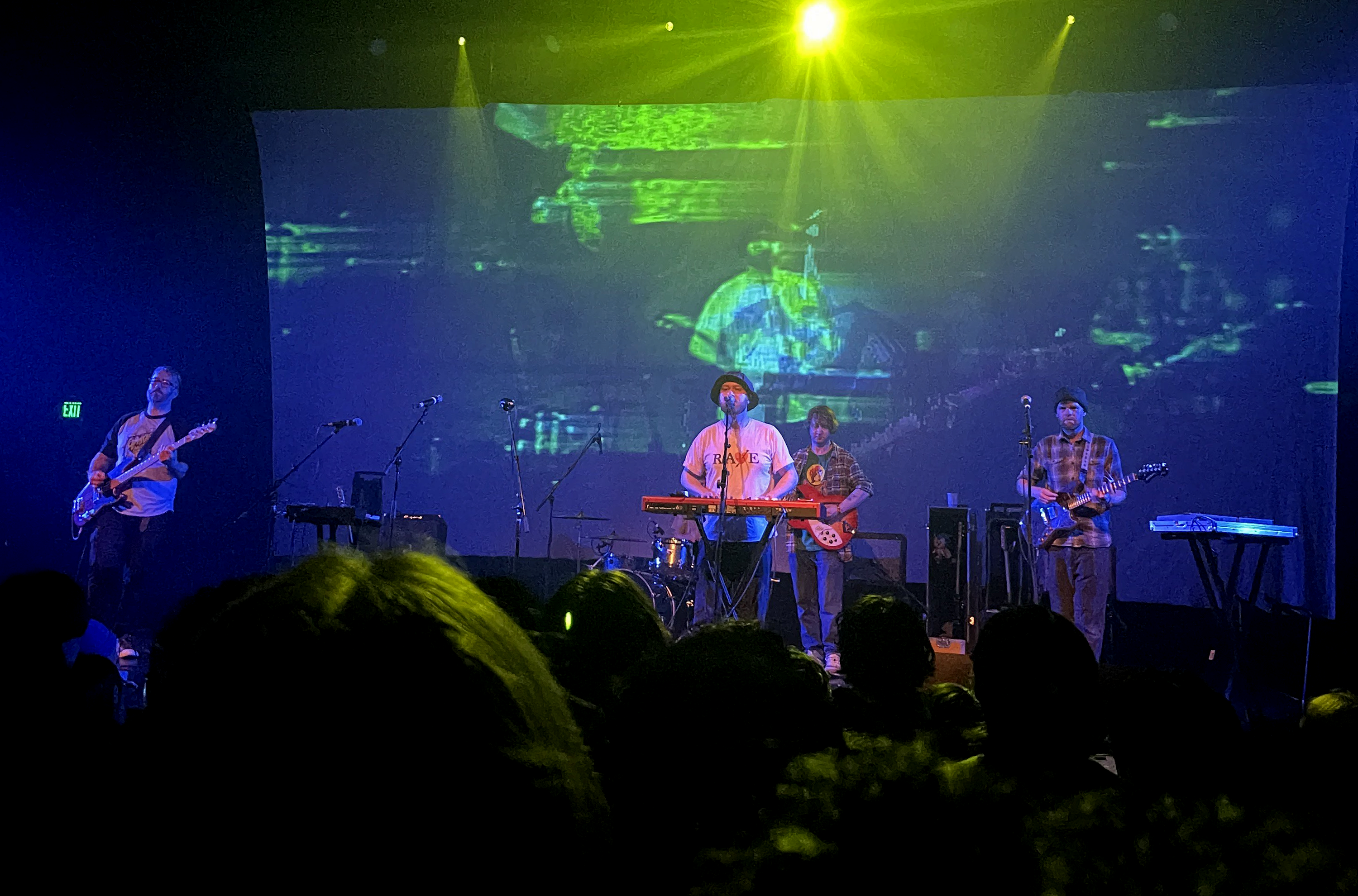
- Panchiko performing at the Fonda Theatre, 14 May 2023

Background information
- Origin: Nottingham, England
- Genres: Indie rock; dream pop; neo-psychedelia; indietronica; trip hop; post-Britpop; noise pop
- Years active: 1997–2001; 2020–present
- Label: Nettwerk
- Members: Owain Davies; Andy Wright; Shaun Ferreday; Jon Nellen; Rob Harris
- Past members: John (Note: Due to the band's tendency to omit their full names from the liner notes, John's surname has never been made public.); John Schofield
- Website: panchiko.net
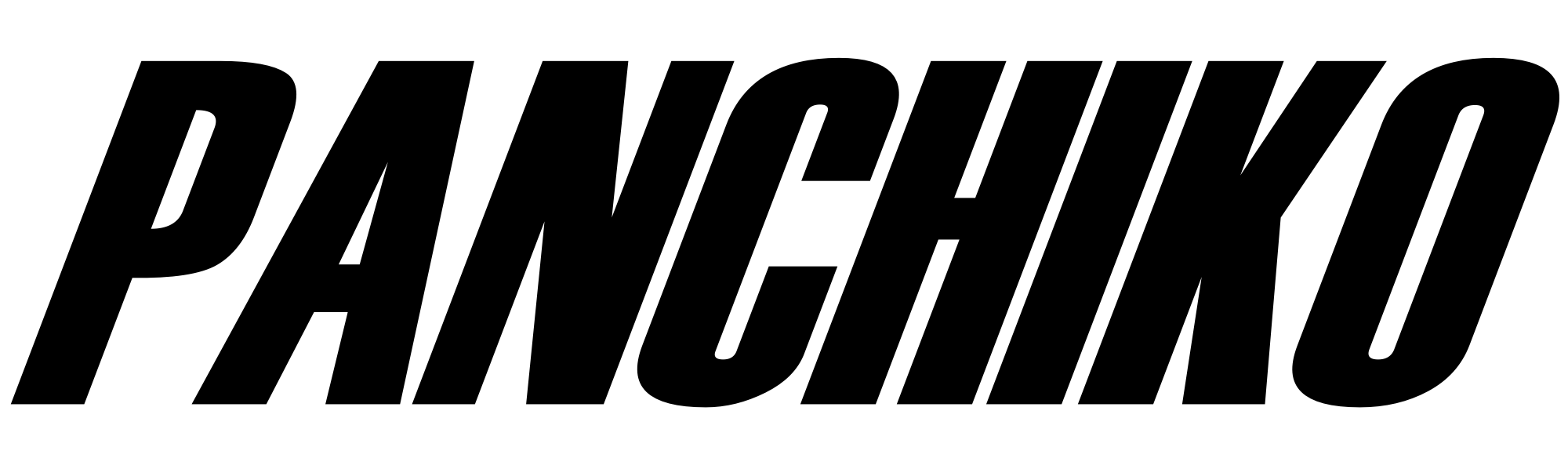

Panchiko (/pænˈtʃiːkoʊ/ pan-CHEE-koh) is a British indie rock band originating from Nottingham, England. Formed between 1997 and 1998, the band originally consisted of lead vocalist and guitarist Owain Davies, guitarist/keyboardist Andrew "Andy" Wright, bassist Shaun Ferreday, and a drummer named John. A year after the revival of Panchiko in 2020, they were joined by guitarist Robert "Rob" Harris and John Schofield, who replaced their original drummer.

The band first received public attention in 2016 when their 2000 demo EP D>E>A>T>H>M>E>T>A>L was discovered by a 4chan user in a charity shop in Sherwood, Nottingham and shared online through the music discussion section of the messageboard; the disc was notably distorted due to disc rot, lending further mystery to the EP, leading to a dedicated cult following and an online community devoted to tracking down the band. This was unknown to the band until 2020, when Davies was found and contacted by a fan through Facebook.

Panchiko have since released two compilation albums remastering their older music: a reissue of D>E>A>T>H>M>E>T>A>L combining their first two EPs, and Ferric Oxide (Demos 1997–2001). In December 2021, the band performed their first show in over twenty years in their hometown of Nottingham, after which they embarked on their first tour in the United States. The band's debut album Failed at Math(s) was released on 5 May 2023, followed by their second full tour in the United States. Their second studio album, Ginkgo, was released on 4 April 2025. In November 2021, they amassed over ten million streams on Spotify. As of October 2026, they have 6 million monthly listeners.

== History ==
=== 1997–2001: Formation, D>E>A>T>H>M>E>T>A>L, and disbanding ===
Panchiko formed between 1997 and 1998 when their members were 16–17 years old and nearing the end of secondary school. The band consisted of childhood friends from Nottingham—Owain Davies, Andy Wright, Shaun Ferreday, and John. Panchiko's band name is derived from an unintentional misspelling of pachinko. Davies has stated that otaku culture had an influence on the band's lyrics and image, describing himself to be a fan of anime soundtracks, JRPGs and Studio Ghibli. The music they made was primarily influenced by Radiohead, Super Furry Animals, Ultrasound, Air, The Beatles, DJ Shadow, Joy Division, New Order, Nirvana, and Kid Loco.

The cover art for D>E>A>T>H>M>E>T>A>L

The band initially performed live covers in local pubs despite being underage. They also performed in Battle of the Bands competitions, but never won and rarely received positive feedback. After an unsuccessful visit to a studio, Panchiko eventually began to produce music in their basements and bedrooms using cheap equipment. Davies has stated that their first extended play, D>E>A>T>H>M>E>T>A>L, was recorded between 1999 and 2000, with Wright serving as the group's producer. The EP was completed in June 2000.

The cover artwork was taken from a panel of Mint na Bokura, a Japanese manga series by Wataru Yoshizumi spanning from 1997 to 1999. Notably, the EP's liner notes only credit the band members by their first names. The music on the EP has been described as emo, industrial, dream pop, psychedelic, shoegaze, trip hop, and vaporwave. Roughly 30 self-produced copies were burned on CD-Rs and shared among friends, with a few copies being sent to reviewers and labels. Aside from some "not very positive" reviews, Panchiko only received one response from a label they had sent their EP to, London-based record label Fierce Panda. Label owner Simon Williams made the following note in his demo logs documenting his impressions of the EP:

'Death Metal', of course, is anything but death metal. Hahaha!! Lovely sweet vocals, then some wiggy wiggy stuff. Needs a bit of va-va-va-voom on the vocals front. I really like this. It would make my ears stand on end if I heard it on the radio. 'Stabilisers For Big Boys' = great. Swearing + ranting in a very familiar stylee. 'Laputa' is lovely and slow. Bugger knows what they remind me of.

— Simon Williams (November 2000)

Despite Fierce Panda showing some interest, the band ultimately remained unsigned. Davies stated that they did not have the means to perform in London at the time, and speculated that "no A&R would travel to Nottingham to see one band." Between 2000 and 2001, Panchiko recorded three more songs for an EP called Kicking Cars, which would go unreleased. In 2001, the band members were in sixth form and college. Ferreday said that he was balancing college, studying classical guitar, and working different part-time jobs. Their second EP has been described as "art rock". Wright remembers performing at a small festival in Sutton-in-Ashfield in mid-2001 after which Panchiko disbanded. Davies recalls that this decision was not entirely conscious because he, Wright, and Ferreday were already enrolled in college, while John was enlisted into the military.

In between the time of D>E>A>T>H>M>E>T>A>L and the band's resurgence, Wright and Davies both remained involved in music. After college, Wright performed with the Nottingham-based art rock band Swimming. Afterward, he began his own musical project called We Show Up on RadaR. Wright has mixed, mastered, and produced for the aforementioned groups and other bands as a professional sound engineer. Davies produced electronic music for years (some of which was released via MySpace) and served as a video jockey at live events in the gaming industry. However, he eventually pursued a career in the field of education. Ferreday sold his guitars and had not played music until Panchiko's future reunion. He now works as a tree surgeon. The original drummer John was enlisted into the military soon after Panchiko disbanded. Afterward, the other three members lost contact with him completely.

=== 2016–2020: Resurgence and search effort ===
hey hey

I picked this up because it looked interesting

I wasn't able to find any references to it, online, whatsoever. even with super obscure bands, you might expect to find some an old myspace page or mention in some forum.

does anybody recognise the album?

I half expected it to be noise pop or some vapourwave wankery. listening to it, now, track 1 is like hella lo fi shoegaze with noise panning back and forth.

this isn't some viral marketing bullshit. I'm just curious if anyone can shed some light on it and I'm slightly excited by the prospect of owning a rare album

peace

— Original post on 4chan, 21 July 2016

On 21 July 2016, a copy of Panchiko's EP D>E>A>T>H>M>E>T>A>L was discovered in an Oxfam charity shop by an anonymous user of the online message board 4chan. The user shared an image of the CD on the music board /mu/ and requested assistance in uncovering more information about the band. The liner notes contained only the band members' first names and the EP's year of release, making further investigation difficult. Shortly after the initial post, multiple requests were made by other board members for the user to upload a ripped copy of the CD. Subsequently, the user complied, eventually sharing the tracks from the EP. However, due to the CD-R's age and deterioration, disc rot had corrupted and heavily distorted the audio. Many maintained the EP to be a hoax, speculating that the initial 4chan post was a publicity stunt, but the band had nonetheless gained a significant cult following without their knowledge. Despite generating considerable interest at the time, no information was uncovered regarding the band.

In 2017, D>E>A>T>H>M>E>T>A>L was further popularized when the rip was uploaded to YouTube. The upload garnered around 200,000 views and sparked renewed interest in the band. Ultimately, it also lead to the formation of a dedicated search effort by fans to gather, compile, and discuss new findings. On 19 January 2020, researchers took note of a bar code on the EP's cover which directed them to an Oxfam shop in Sherwood, Nottingham, leading users to search for musicians in the area named "Owain".

On 21 January 2020, a member of the search team successfully located a Facebook profile belonging to Panchiko's lead singer. They also messaged, "Hello, you'll probably never read this, but are you the lead singer of Panchiko?" To which Davies replied, "Yeah." Davies, now in his late 30s, had been completely unaware of the EP's circulation online. He immediately contacted Wright, who was in South Korea; Wright then contacted Ferreday, who was in Cambridge. Neither of them were aware of the band's newfound popularity either. The original drummer John was no longer in contact with the band, and his whereabouts are currently unknown. It is also unclear if he is aware of Panchiko's current status or success.

=== 2020–2022: Reformation, reissues, and touring ===
Wright, after being contacted by Davies, tasked himself with recovering and remastering Panchiko's past works. During Wright's restoration efforts, Davies was quoted saying the following:

What I find interesting is after listening to many videos on YouTube about the EP, I feel that the degradation of the CD is part of the music now. It is a part of why people enjoy the music. And whilst I try to look for an original copy, I feel like it may take something away from what people found in the music. Maybe it's best left how people found it, as this interesting half-destroyed piece of music from a far-gone era... I think it's what makes it charming today, and that's what people should hold onto and enjoy about the CD.

— Owain Davies (25 January 2020)

Wright initially struggled to restore the audio because he did not have access to the original masters. However, a friend of Wright's in possession of the original EP reached out, their copy in significantly better condition and without the disc rot. Using this copy, Wright managed to remaster the four tracks found on the D>E>A>T>H>M>E>T>A>L CD. They were subsequently released two weeks later, offering listeners clearer versions for the first time. On 16 February 2020, Panchiko reissued D>E>A>T>H>M>E>T>A>L through Bandcamp, expanding it into a full-length compilation album. The reissue also includes tracks from their unreleased EP Kicking Cars from 2001, as well as the original "rotted" versions of D>E>A>T>H>M>E>T>A>L's four tracks. It became one of the best-selling albums on Bandcamp on the day it was released. The compilation album was released on Spotify two months later.

From there, Davies, Wright, and Ferreday worked together to revamp their band. Throughout 2020 and 2021, Panchiko issued more unreleased music recorded between 1997 and 2001, as well as new original music. This music was released to streaming services and sold in a variety of physical formats through Bandcamp, including vinyl and cassettes. In July 2020, Panchiko released Ferric Oxide (Demos 1997–2001), which contains 18 previously unreleased demo tracks. In May 2020, they released "R>O>B>O>T>S>R>E>P>R>I>S>E", a rerecording of their song "Laputa". In June 2020, they released "Machine Gun Drum", their first original song since disbanding. In February 2021, the band released The Death Of, which contains "Infinite Pieces", a track they had stumbled upon by accident after discovering a CD with no label. This was the final track the band recorded before disbanding in 2001.

In November 2020, Panchiko released a collection of remixes of their song "D>E>A>T>H>M>E>T>A>L". One of the artists Panchiko collaborated with was Tongg. In the past, Wright had regularly contributed keys and produced for Tongg under the name We Show Up on RadaR. Among other members, Tongg consists of members Rob Harris (who performs vocals, guitar, and keys) and John Schofield (who performs drums and percussion). In late 2021, Panchiko recruited Harris and Schofield as guitarist and drummer, respectively. On 31 August 2021, the band reconvened for their first practice session in 20 years. On 6 December 2021, they performed their first live show since disbanding at the Metronome venue in their hometown of Nottingham, playing in front of a crowd of around 400 attendees.

On 13 May 2022, they performed their next major gig in Hackney, London. Later that year, the band embarked on their first tour, set in the United States and including a performance at the South by Southwest festival in Texas. During their tour, they released a deluxe pressing called D>E>L>U>X>E>M>E>T>A>L, which rose to the number two spot on Bandcamp's Alternative rock chart on 20 October 2022.

=== 2023–present: Failed at Math(s), Ginkgo, and Chimera ===
On 13 February 2023, the band announced the release of their debut album Failed at Math(s), which was released on 5 May of the same year. On 7 March 2023, Panchiko released "Failed at Math(s)", the opening track from the album. It is the second original song to be released that was recorded after their reformation. In May 2023, Panchiko embarked on their second full tour in the United States. In December 2023, Panchiko announced their third tour across North America.

On 22 November 2024, the band released a music video for the new track "Ginkgo". This music video coincided with an announcement for their second album, also titled Ginkgo, which was released on 4 April 2025. A second single, "Shandy in the Graveyard" was released on 3 January 2025. A third single, "Honeycomb", was released on 14 February 2025.

On 23 October 2026, the band released a single titled “One Car Hits Another,” featuring Mei Semones. The release was accompanied by the announcement of their third studio album, Chimera, scheduled for release on 9 April 2027.

== Band members ==
On many of their releases, the band members are credited with "Panchiko" as a surname, i.e. "Andy Panchiko".

Current members

- Owain Davies – vocals, guitars, sampler (1997–2001, 2020–present), piano (2020–present)
- Andrew "Andy" Wright – guitars, keyboards, sampler, backing vocals (1997–2001, 2020–present)
- Shaun Ferreday – bass, programming, effects (1997–2001, 2020–present)
- Robert "Rob" Harris – guitars (2021–present)
- Jon Nellen – drums, percussion (2025–present)

Past members

- John – drums, percussion (1997–2001)
- John Schofield – drums, percussion (2021–2025)

== Discography ==
=== Studio albums ===
List of studio albums
Title	Album details
Failed at Math(s)	Released: 5 May 2023; Label: Self-released; Format: Digital download, CD, vinyl
Ginkgo	Released: 4 April 2025; Label: Nettwerk; Format: Digital download, CD, vinyl
Chimera	Released: 9 April 2027; Label: Nettwerk; Format: Digital download, vinyl

=== Extended plays ===
List of extended plays
Title	EP details
D>E>A>T>H>M>E>T>A>L	Released: 18 June 2000; Label: Self-released; Format: CD
Kicking Cars	Recorded: 2001 (Note: Kicking Cars is a three track Extended play recorded in 2001. The EP would remain unreleased until 2020, when it was remastered and included on a reissue of D>E>A>T>H>M>E>T>A>L.); Format: Unreleased

=== Reissues ===
List of Reissues
Title	Album details
D>E>A>T>H>M>E>T>A>L (Remastered and reissued)	Released: 16 February 2020 (Note: This release of D>E>A>T>H>M>E>T>A>L includes the four tracks from their 2000 EP of the same name, the three tracks from the following 2001 EP Kicking Cars, as well as the disc rot versions of tracks 1–4. The cover artwork used for the original EP was repurposed for the 2020 release, but slight alterations were made to the design. This full-length release was remastered by band member Andy Wright.); Label: Self-released; Format: Digital download, CD, vinyl, cassette

=== Compilation albums ===
List of compilation albums
Title	Album details
Ferric Oxide (Demos 1997–2001)	Released: 25 July 2020; Label: Self-released; Format: Digital download, vinyl, cassette
D>E>L>U>X>E>M>E>T>A>L	Released: 2 October 2020 (Note: D>E>L>U>X>E>M>E>T>A>L is a vinyl remaster of the content found on the 11-track D>E>A>T>H>M>E>T>A>L reissue; however, it also features three demo (or "alternative") versions of the Kicking Cars songs. This release totals in 14 tracks. The physical releases do not contain the rot versions of the original EP tracks, having the Kicking Cars demos instead.); Label: Self-released; Format: Digital download, vinyl, cassette

=== Remix albums ===
List of remix albums
Title	Album details
D>E>A>T>H>M>E>T>A>L>S	Released: 20–22 November 2020 (Note: D>E>A>T>H>M>E>T>A>L>S was released to Bandcamp on 20 November 2020, while R>E>M>I>X>E>D was released on streaming services on 22 November 2020. The two projects share four remixes of the song "D>E>A>T>H>M>E>T>A>L"; however, the former Bandcamp release contains an exclusive fifth remix by an artist called Identity Clinic, as well as a live performance of the song; the latter Spotify release contains demo versions of the three Kicking Cars songs.); Release type: EP; Label: Self-released; Format: Digital download
R>E>M>I>X>E>D	Released: 20–22 November 2020; Release type: EP; Label: Self-released; Format: Digital download

=== Live albums ===
List of live albums
Title	Album details
L>I>V>E>M>E>T>A>L	Released: 2–18 June 2021 (Note: In 2021, Panchiko released a collection of live performances in the form of an EP. L>I>V>E>M>E>T>A>L was released on Bandcamp on 2 June 2021; Live was released on streaming services on 18 June 2021. Despite differing in name, the Bandcamp and streaming releases both share a track list consisting of an alternate "90's anime version" of "Stabilisers for Big Boys", as well as three live performances; however, the Bandcamp release features an additional instrumental version of "Stabilisers for Big Boys".); Release type: EP; Label: Self-released; Format: Digital download
Live	Released: 2–18 June 2021; Release type: EP; Label: Self-released; Format: Digital download
Live in Nottingham	Released: 22 April 2022; Release type: LP; Label: Self-released; Format: Digital download, vinyl

=== Singles ===
List of singles as lead artist, showing year released and album name
Title	Year	Album
"R>O>B>O>T>S>R>E>P>R>I>S>E" (Note: Rerecorded version of "Laputa".)	2020	Non-album single
"Machine Gun Drum"	2020	Non-album single
"Untitled Demo - 1997"	2020	Ferric Oxide (Demos 1997–2001)
The Death Of ("Infinite Pieces" / "Untitled Acoustic Song - 1997")	2021	Non-album single
"Failed at Math(s)"	2023	Failed at Math(s)
"Until I Know"	2023	Failed at Math(s)
"Portraits"	2023	Failed at Math(s)
"Ginkgo"	2024	Ginkgo
"Shandy in the Graveyard" (featuring Billy Woods)	2025	Ginkgo
"Honeycomb"	2025	Ginkgo
"Mac's Omelette"	2025	Ginkgo
"Lifestyle Trainers"	2025	Ginkgo
"One Car Hits Another" (featuring Mei Semones)	2026	Chimera

== Music videos ==
List of music videos
Date	Title	Director
2023	"Until I Know"	Simon Ellis
2023	"Portraits"	Shunsaku Hayashi
2024	"Ginkgo"	Simon Ellis
2025	"Shandy in the Graveyard"	Simon Ellis
2025	"Honeycomb"	Leah Putnam
2025	"Mac's Omelette"	Simon Ellis

=== Visualizers ===
List of self-released visualizers for songs
Date	Title
2020	"R>O>B>O>T>R>E>P>R>I>S>E"
2020	"ROAD RASH VS PANCHIKO"
2020	"Tongg - DEATHMETAL Remix"
2021	"Stabilisers For Big Boys - 1997 Anime Opening Credits Version"
2023	"Failed at Math(s)"
2023	"Gwen Everest"
2025	"Chapel of Salt"
2025	"Lifestyle Trainers"
2026	"One Car Hits Another"

=== Live sessions ===
List of self-produced live sessions
Date	Title
2020	"PANCHIKO - DEATHMETAL"
2021	"PANCHIKO – LAPUTA – LIVE"
2021	"PANCHIKO – UNTITLED ACOUSTIC SONG 1997 – LIVE(ISH)"
2021	"MEGA_GHOST_SESSION"
2021	"PANCHIKO – STUCK – FIRST BAND PRACTICE IN 20 YEARS"
2021	"Panchiko – GWEN EVEREST – Acoustic"
2025	"All They Wanted - Panchiko! Acoustic!"

== Tours ==
List of tours
Tour	Date range	Supporting acts	Notes
2022 Tour	9 October 2022 – 30 October 2022	They Are Gutting a Body of Water; Julie; Computerwife	Set in the United States, the tour spanned 20 shows, including a performance at the South by Southwest festival in Texas.
Failed at Math(s) Tour	7 May 2023 – 4 June 2023	Horse Jumper of Love; LSD and the Search for God	Set in the United States, the tour spanned 19 shows, including a performance at the "Sick New World" festival at the Las Vegas Festival Grounds.
Failed at Math(s) UK and Europe Tour	7 October 2023 – 1 December 2023	CJ's Mirra Maze; Godcaster	Set in venues throughout the UK and Europe, the tour spanned over 16 shows.
2024 North America Tour	16 April 2024 – 18 May 2024	Glare; Weatherday; They Are Gutting a Body of Water; Wisp	Set in the United States, the tour spanned 22 shows.
Fall 2024 North America Tour	25 October 2024 – 24 November 2024	Alison's Halo; Trauma Ray; Wisp; Glare	Set in the United States and Canada, the tour spanned 21 tour dates.
Spring 2025 UK and Europe Tour	25 March 2025 – 5 April 2025	Mei Semones	Set in venues throughout the UK and Europe, the tour spanned 8 shows.
Ginkgo US Tour	28 May 2025 – 24 June 2025	Alison's Halo; Model/Actriz; Kitty Craft; Tanukichan; Clinic Stars; flyingfish; Untitled (halo)	Set in the United States (with one show in Canada), the tour spanned 20 shows.
Fall 2025 US Tour	16 September 2025 – 5 October 2025	Trauma Ray; Glixen; sundots	Set in the United States, the tour spanned 15 shows.
US Tour 2026	16 April 2026 – 12 May 2026	Dead Calm; flyingfish; Rehash; sundots; Clarion	Set in the United States, the tour spanned 21 shows.
EU/UK Tour 2026	7 October 2026 – 31 October 2026	Alison's Halo; CJ's Mirra Maze	Set in Europe, the tour will span 13 shows.
USA Spring Tour 2027	13 April 2027 – 15 May 2027	Puzzle; billy woods; Clarion; Korea Girl; Alison's Halo; she's green; sundots; Novulent; STOMACH BOOK	Set in the United States, the tour will span 19 shows.
