= Kitty Craft =

American musician

Pamela Valfer, also known as Kitty Craft, is an American musician. She is most known for her debut album, Beats and Breaks from the Flower Patch. Her music incorporates elements of lo-fi, indie and trip-hop, as well as recurring guitar loops. She has recently gained prominence through social media and streaming, contributing to the popularisation of twee-pop amongst youth on social media platforms. More generally, she has been categorized as indie pop. She incorporates elements of psychedelic music, lo-fi music and trip hop into her sound. Her style is known for its heavy use of samples. AllMusic has described this style as "sampledelic indie pop".

== History ==
=== Other Projects ===
Originally based in Minneapolis, Valfer contributed to many projects in the area during the 1990's, including forming the band Saucer in 1992, but left shortly after to pursue a solo music career.

=== As Kitty Craft ===
In an interview with Firebird Magazine, Valfer stated that the origins of her iconic name arose from her "simply [finding] a cool font that said “Kitty” and a cool font that said “Craft,” and I stuck them together. Its aesthetic just spoke to me and I thought to myself, “That sounds right!”", whilst designing covers for her cassette tapes during the mid-90's. Valfer's work as Kitty Craft initially gained a college radio following in the late 90's during a cultural shift towards more lo-fi music, before going on hiatus to pursue other art mediums. When her music regained notability on social media such as TikTok amid the rise of laptop twee, Valfer returned from hiatus, releasing her unpublished recordings in the Lost Tapes (2020) album which marked her return as a musician. Other indie musicians such as Clairo and TV Girl have acknowledged her music to fans, cementing Kitty Craft's place within the indie and twee-pop scenes.

In 2025, Kitty Craft supported alternative rock band Panchiko during their Ginkgo US Tour. Shortly after, she unveiled her own American tour along the East Coast, supported by the band After.

In 2026, Kitty Craft launched multiple tours, consisting of the Sunshine State Tour (April 18-20), and a UK/EU tour (May 27 - June 7), her first tour in Europe.

== Discography ==
=== Singles ===
- I'm Gonna Steal Your Girlfriend (2025)
- No Bets (2026)
- Trax (x2) (2026)
- Lo-Fi (2026)

=== EPs ===
- It's Stupid (1995)
- I Got Rulez (1997)
- Bits + Bobs from the Flower Patch Vol. I (2025)
- Bits + Bobs from the Flower Patch Vol. II
- Bits + bobs from the flower patch vol. ||| (2026)

=== Albums ===
- Beats and Breaks from the Flower Patch (1998)
- Catskills (2000)
- Lost Tapes (2020)

=== Compilations ===
- Mew 1996-2004 (2022)
