= Ginkgo (album) =

2025 studio album by Panchiko

Studio album by Panchiko
- Released: 4 April 2025
- Genres: Indie rock; art rock; neo-psychedelia
- Length: 39:13
- Label: Nettwerk
- Producer: Panchiko

Panchiko chronology
Failed at Math(s) (2023)	Ginkgo (2025)	Chimera (2027)

Singles from Ginkgo
- 1. "Ginkgo" Released: 22 November 2024; 2. "Shandy in the Graveyard" Released: 3 January 2025; 3. "Honeycomb" Released: 14 February 2025; 4. "Mac's Omelette" Released: 14 March 2025; 5. "Lifestyle Trainers" Released: 23 May 2025; 6. "Florida" Released: 4 July 2025; 7. "Shelled and Cooked" Released: 29 August 2025

Ginkgo is the second studio album by British indie rock band Panchiko. It was released on 4 April 2025 through Nettwerk.

== Recording ==
In an interview for Mixdown with band members Andy Wright and Owain Davies, Wright revealed the band had used equipment such as a BAE 1073 and an API 2500+ for a preamp, a McDSP APB analog processing box and a modded Neumann U 67 microphone during the recording for Ginkgo. Recording took place within the band's studio in Nottingham, with Pieter Rietkerk engineering drums and guitars for the band. Most of the recording for the drums was done by Jon Nellen in his studio in Brooklyn.

Wright also discussed how the recording process for Ginkgo was much easier than that of Failed at Math(s); this was because the band had more time to write and "more time to make mistakes". The struggle of the band maintaining their regular jobs was also noted as a difficult factor of recording their previous album.

== Advertisement and release ==
Ginkgo was formally announced on 22 November 2024. The announcement was accompanied with the release of the title track, "Ginkgo", and its music video, filmed inside of a chicken coop. A tour for North America, Europe and the UK in support of the album was announced on 10 December 2024; it is scheduled to begin on 28 April 2025.

On 3 January 2025 a second single for the album was released, titled "Shandy in the Graveyard". This second single featured a guest appearance from American rapper Billy Woods. "Honeycomb", the third single for the album, was released on 14 February 2025. It was accompanied with an animated music video by Leah Putnam. Ginkgo was released on both LP and digital services on 4 April 2025 through Nettwerk. After the album's release, "Lifestyle Trainers", "Florida" and "Shelled and Cooked" were released as singles on 23 May, 4 July and 29 August 2025 respectively.

== Track listing ==
All tracks are written by Owain Davies and Andrew Wright.

Ginkgo track listing
No.	Title	Length
1.	"Florida"	4:11
2.	"Ginkgo"	2:37
3.	"Shandy in the Graveyard" (featuring Billy Woods)	2:57
4.	"Honeycomb"	3:14
5.	"Shelled and Cooked"	2:13
6.	"Lifestyle Trainers"	3:07
7.	"Chapel of Salt"	3:08
8.	"Vinegar"	2:15
9.	"Mac's Omelette"	3:58
10.	"Subtitles"	2:47
11.	"Formula"	2:43
12.	"Rise and Fall"	3:19
13.	"Innocent"	2:44
Total length:		39:13

== Personnel ==
Credits adapted from the album's liner notes.

=== Panchiko ===
- Owain Davies – performance, production, mixing, engineering
- Andy Wright – performance, production, mixing, engineering
- Shaun Ferreday – performance, production, mixing, engineering
- Jon Nellen – performance, production, mixing, engineering
- Rob Harris – performance, production, mixing, engineering

=== Additional contributors ===
- John Braddock – mastering
- Billy Woods – vocals on "Shandy in the Graveyard"
- Lyla – cover photo
- Leif – design

== Charts ==
Chart performance for Ginkgo
Chart (2025)	Peak position
UK Independent Albums Breakers (OCC)	17
