= Animaru =

Studio album by Mei Semones
- Released: May 2, 2025
- Studios: Ashlawn Recording Company, Connecticut
- Genres: J-pop; bossa nova; indie
- Length: 37:49
- Label: Bayonet

Mei Semones chronology
Kabutomushi (2024)	Animaru (2025)	Howl (2027)

Singles from Animaru
- 1. "Dumb Feeling" Released: February 4, 2025

Animaru is the debut studio album by American indie rock musician Mei Semones. It was released on May 2, 2025, by Bayonet Records.

== Background ==
The album, recorded by Ashlawn Recording Company in Connecticut, was preceded by Semones' 2024 EP, Kabutomushi. Animaru's lead single, "Dumb Feeling", was released on February 4, 2025. The album features ten songs ranging between two and six minutes each, with Semones singing in English and Japanese. The title of the album is derived from the Japanese pronunciation of "animal". It incorporates elements of J-pop, bossa nova, and indie music.

Semones named the album Animaru to symbolize the instinctual nature of animals. “Animals, they follow their instincts. They eat when they want, sleep when they want, that type of thing.” Which also inspired the name for the track I Can Do What I Want. Semones hopes that through this album, people become inspired to “do what they wanna do” and to do what they love and to pursue their passions.

== Reception ==
Professional ratings
Review scores
Source	Rating
AllMusic	4.5/5 stars
Clash	8/10 stars
Paste	7.6/10
Pitchfork	7.5/10
Sputnikmusic	4.1/5

Marcy Donelson of AllMusic remarked, "Throughout Animaru, Semones and her band play with dynamics, dramatic pauses, chord voicings, harmonics, and a steady stream of surprises." Sputnikmusic's Dakota Foss described the album as "gorgeous as can be, and undeniably triumphant as a debut," rating it 4.1 out of five. Christopher Connor of Clash Magazine referred to it as "an exhilarating, eclectic offering that shows a maturity far beyond someone releasing their first album," assigning it a rating of eight out of ten. Paste rated it 7.6 out of ten, stating "Few moments on Animaru are conventional and, in a world full of boring trends and rabid overconsumption, we could all benefit from taking a page out of Mei Semones' playbook." Pitchfork gave the album a rating of 7.5, noting that "Animaru has no duds but also no true stand-outs, shining most when Semones takes on the unexpected—suggesting a more idiosyncratic artist underneath all the virtuosity and polish."

== Track listing ==
Animaru track listing
No.	Title	Length
1.	"Dumb Feeling"	3:10
2.	"Dangomushi"	3:19
3.	"Tora Moyo"	2:51
4.	"I Can Do What I Want"	3:00
5.	"Animaru"	2:41
6.	"Donguri"	3:35
7.	"Norwegian Shag"	4:02
8.	"Rat with Wings"	4:40
9.	"Zarigani"	4:33
10.	"Sasayaku Sakebu"	5:58
Total length:		37:49

Japan Bonus Track
No.	Title	Length
11.	"Itsumo"	4:11

== Personnel ==
Credits for Animaru adapted from Bandcamp.

- Mei Semones – guitar, vocals, songwriting
- Noah Leong – viola
- Claudius Agrippa – violin
- Noam Tanzer – bass
- Ransom McCafferty – drums
- Charles Dahlke – co-producer, recording, and mixing
- Heba Kadry – mastering
