= Rehash (band) =

American rock band

- Origin: Hallandale Beach, Florida
- Genres: Indie rock; alternative rock; grunge
- Members: Renzo Valdez; Sebastian Gamez; Ethan Lopez; Daseth Lopez

Rehash is an American rock band from Hallandale Beach, Florida. The group consists of vocalist and rhythm guitarist Renzo Valdez, lead guitarist Sebastian Gamez, drummer Ethan Lopez and bassist Daseth Lopez.

The band was initially formed by high school friends Renzo Valdez and Sebastian Gamez, before being joined by siblings Ethan Lopez and bassist Daseth Lopez. They released their first single "Power Trips / At The End" in November 2022, followed by their debut self-titled album in 2023. In 2024, they released their second album, Mourning Star. This album included the single "Back to Strangers", which gained the band much more traction primarily via TikTok. In June 2025, they put out their third album "mock".

Rehash's sound has been compared to that of Panchiko, Radiohead and The Strokes, often described as being influenced by 90's and 2000's indie and alternative rock.

== Discography ==
=== Albums ===
- Rehash (2023)
- Mourning Star (2024)
- mock (2025)
