= Mahalia =

Mahalia is a given name and may refer to:

- Mahalia Barnes (born 1982), Australian singer-songwriter
- Mahalia Belo, British film and television director
- Mahalia Burkmar (born 1998), known mononymously as Mahalia, English singer, songwriter and actress
- Mahalia Cassidy (born 1995), Australian netball player
- Mahalia Jackson (1911–1972), American gospel singer
