= Mei Semones =

American musician

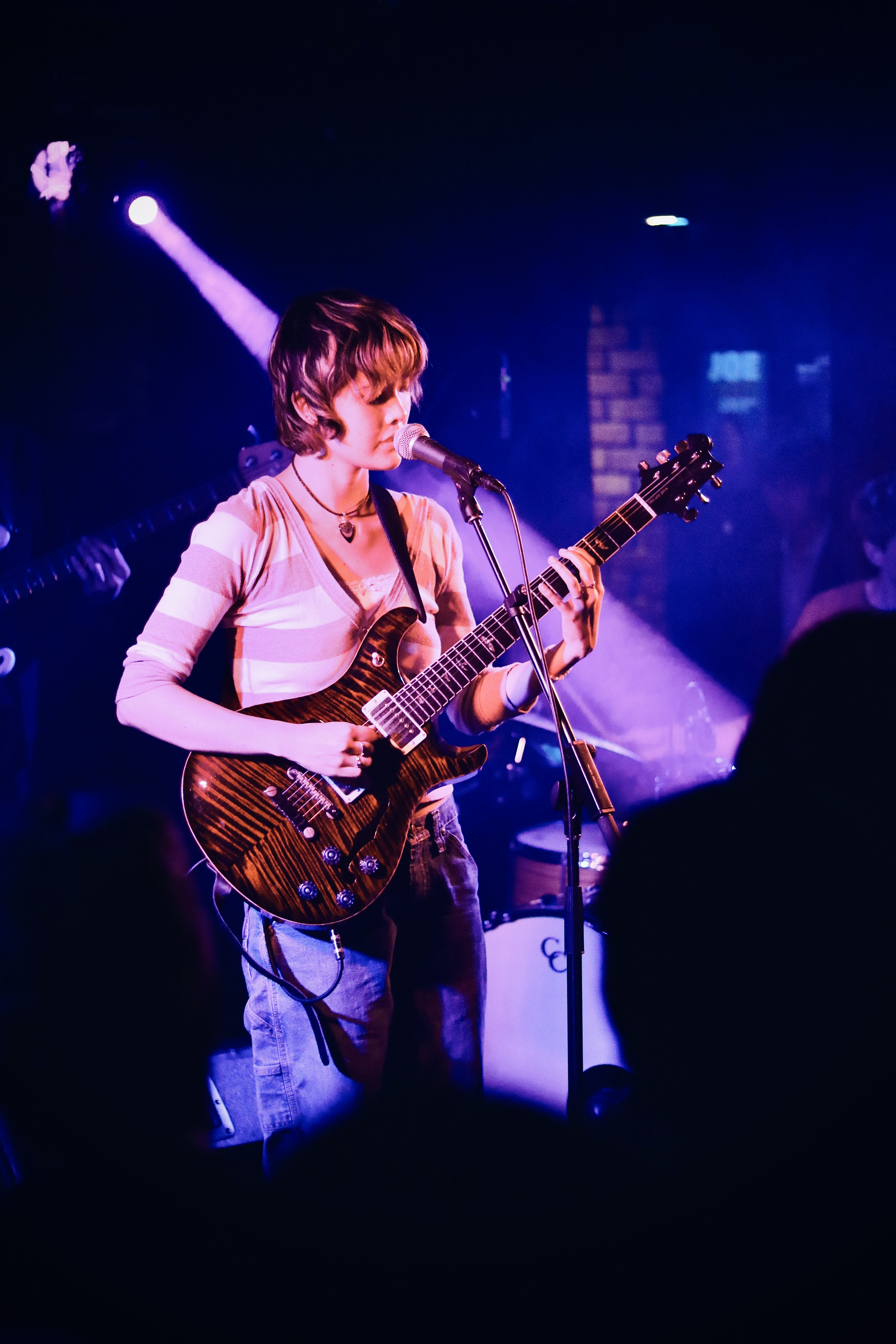
- Semones performing at the Biltmore Cabaret in Vancouver, 2025

Background information
- Born: 2000 (age 25–26); Ann Arbor, Michigan, US
- Genres: Jazz rock; indie rock
- Occupation: Musician
- Instruments: Vocals; guitar
- Years active: 2022-present
- Label: Bayonet Records
- Website: www.meisemones.com

Mei Semones (born 2000) is an American musician. Her musical style incorporates jazz pop and indie rock influences, with lyrics in both English and Japanese.

== Early life ==
Semones was born in 2000 in Ann Arbor, Michigan, to a father from Ohio and a Japanese mother. Encouraged by her grandmother, she initially studied piano, but ultimately switched to the guitar at the age of eleven, inspired by a scene in the film Back to the Future in which Marty McFly plays Chuck Berry's Johnny B. Goode.

Semones joined the Community High School jazz program in high school and later majored in professional music at Berklee College of Music.

== Musical career ==
Semones self-released her debut EP, Tsukino, in 2022, during her last semester of college.. Later that year she released Sukikirai as a graduation project through Northeastern University's Green Line Records.

In 2024, Semones released her second EP, Kabutomushi, through Bayonet Records. Semones was named by Paste as "The Best of What's Next" in 2024.

In 2025, she released her debut studio album, Animaru.

In 2026, she released her third EP, Kurage.

== Artistry ==
She has described her music as "jazz-influenced indie J-pop".

== Personal life ==
Semones currently lives in Brooklyn, New York, where she works part-time at a preschool for Japanese children. Her father is an amateur musician who plays the euphonium, guesting on her 2026 EP Kurage.

== Discography ==
=== Albums ===
- Animaru (2025)
- Howl (2027)

=== EPs ===
- Tsukino (2022)
- Kabutomushi (2024)
- Kurayami/Get used to it (2025)
- Kurage (2026)
