= Deathmetal (EP) =

D>E>A>T>H>M>E>T>A>L

EP by Panchiko
- Released: 18 June 2000
- Recorded: 1999–2000
- Genres: Indie rock; noise pop; trip hop; shoegaze; indie pop; dream pop
- Length: 18:33
- Label: Self-released
- Producers: Owain Davies; Andy Wright

Panchiko chronology
D>E>A>T>H>M>E>T>A>L (2000)	Kicking Cars (2001)

D>E>A>T>H>M>E>T>A>L is the debut EP of British indie rock band Panchiko. It was recorded and self-released by the band between 1999 and 2000, and contains four songs with a total length of 18 minutes and 33 seconds. The EP was created entirely independently by Panchiko as a demo. Approximately 30 copies of the EP were made, all of which were burnt onto recordable CDs.

D>E>A>T>H>M>E>T>A>L failed to receive any form of mainstream attention, and Panchiko disbanded shortly thereafter. It remained in obscurity until it was rediscovered by a 4chan user in July 2016, gathering a cult following. The former members of the band reunited and released a remastered version of the album in February 2020.

== Background ==
Panchiko was formed by a group of high school friends in Nottingham, England in the late 1990s. D>E>A>T>H>M>E>T>A>L was recorded in a band member's bedroom between 1999 and 2000, using inexpensive equipment and a digital eight-track recorder. After its completion, Panchiko produced around 30 CD copies that were mainly sent to record labels and music reviewers, but the EP received virtually no attention and fell into irrelevance. The band would later disband, and the members would go on to pursue individual endeavours.

Despite the name, D>E>A>T>H>M>E>T>A>L does not feature death metal music, and sonically, it resembles indie rock or shoegaze, and has inspirations from Radiohead and Joy Division. Furthermore, it draws on influences from anime and otaku culture. Lead singer Owain Davies has dubbed the EP's sound "weeb Indietronica". The cover of D>E>A>T>H>M>E>T>A>L was taken from a panel of the manga series Mint na Bokura.

== 4chan post and search ==
hey hey

I picked this up because it looked interesting

I wasn't able to find any references to it, online, whatsoever. even with super obscure bands, you might expect to find some an old myspace page or mention in some forum.

does anybody recognise the album?

I half expected it to be noise pop or some vapourwave wankery. listening to it, now, track 1 is like hella lo fi shoegaze with noise panning back and forth.

this isn't some viral marketing bullshit. I'm just curious if anyone can shed some light on it and I'm slightly excited by the prospect of owning a rare album

peace

— Original post on 4chan, 21 July 2016

On 21 July 2016, a user on 4chan posted a copy of D>E>A>T>H>M>E>T>A>L; the user had found the CD at an Oxfam store in Sherwood, Nottingham. The album, an example of lostwave, gained a slight cult following without the members of Panchiko knowing. A search effort for the members of the band was also formed on 4chan. Much of the search and lack of information was due to the members not putting their last names on the back of the album.

On 21 January 2020, a member of the search team successfully located a Facebook profile belonging to Panchiko's lead singer and messaged them, "Hello, you'll probably never read this, but are you the lead singer of Panchiko?" To which Davies replied, "Yeah." Davies, now in his late 30s, had been completely unaware of the EP's circulation online. He immediately contacted Wright, who was in South Korea; Wright then contacted Ferreday, who was in Cambridge. Neither of them were aware of the band's newfound popularity either. The original drummer John was no longer in contact with the band, and his whereabouts are currently unknown. It is also unclear if he is aware of Panchiko's current status or success.

The American netlabel Dismiss Yourself would upload a disc rotted version of the release on their YouTube channel, which garnered popularity during the COVID-19 lockdowns.

== Critical reception ==
D>E>A>T>H>M>E>T>A>L, upon release, was not reviewed by any major music reviewers; the few reviews the EP did receive were "not very positive". The only positive review the EP received upon release was from Simon Williams, owner of London-based record label Fierce Panda, writing:

'Death Metal', of course, is anything but death metal. Hahaha!! Lovely sweet vocals, then some wiggy wiggy stuff. Needs a bit of va-va-va-voom on the vocals front. I really like this. It would make my ears stand on end if I heard it on the radio. 'Stabilisers For Big Boys' = great. Swearing + ranting in a very familiar stylee. 'Laputa' is lovely and slow. Bugger knows what they remind me of.

— Simon Williams

== Reissue and D>E>L>U>X>E>M>E>T>A>L ==
On 16 February 2020, Panchiko released a reissue of the EP with a total of 11 tracks. The reissue featured remastered versions of the original four tracks, three new, unreleased songs from the unreleased EP Kicking Cars, and "R>O>T" versions of the original four songs (versions of the original four tracks with the sound of disc rot). On 2 October 2020, Panchiko released D>E>L>U>X>E>M>E>T>A>L, another reissue, exclusively through their Bandcamp page. Alongside the previously mentioned tracks, it also contains three demos of the songs from Kicking Cars (although the physical releases of this reissue do not contain the rot versions of the original EP tracks, having the demo tracks instead.) The first 100 copies of D>E>L>U>X>E>M>E>T>A>L were signed by members of the band.

== Track listing ==
All tracks were produced by Andy Wright and Owain Davies.

No.	Title	Length
1.	"D>E>A>T>H>M>E>T>A>L"	4:21
2.	"Stabilisers for Big Boys"	4:12
3.	"Laputa"	2:43
4.	"The Eyes of Ibad"	6:57
Total length:		18:33

2020 reissue
No.	Title	Length
5.	"Cut"	4:53
6.	"Sodium Chloride"	2:43
7.	"Kicking Cars"	4:11
8.	"D>E>A>T>H>M>E>T>A>L (Rot Version)"	4:20
9.	"Stabilisers for Big Boys (Rot Version)"	4:11
10.	"Laputa (Rot Version)"	2:44
11.	"The Eyes of Ibad (Rot Version)"	7:01
Total length:		48:17

D>E>L>U>X>E>M>E>T>A>L
No.	Title	Length
8.	"Cut (Demo)"	4:10
9.	"Sodium Chloride (Demo)"	4:18
10.	"Kicking Cars (Demo)"	3:46
Total length:		60:31

== Personnel ==
- Owain Davies – vocals, guitar, sampling, engineering, production.
- Andy Wright – guitar, sequencing, sampling, engineering, production
- Shaun Ferreday – bass guitar, bass programming, effects
- John – drums, sequencing
