= Opus Kink =

English jazz-punk band

- Origin: Brighton, England
- Genres: Post-punk; art punk; jazz punk
- Years active: 2017–present
- Labels: Nice Swan Records; Hideous Mink Records
- Members: Angus Rogers; Sam Abbo; Jazz Pope; Jed Morgans; Jack Banjo Courtney; Fin Abbo
- Past members: Johny Giles
- Website: opuskink.com

Opus Kink are an English post-punk and jazz punk band formed in Brighton in 2017, consisting of Sam Abbo, Angus Rogers, Fin Abbo, Jack Banjo Courtney, Jazz Pope, and Jed Morgans. The band have released three EPs: Requiem For a Quarantine (2020), Til the Stream Runs Dry (2022) and My Eyes, Brother! (2023). Their debut album ‘The Sweet Goodbye’ was released on 31st July 2026. The band are known for incendiary, cult-like live performances, an esoteric range of influences and sonic and lyrical world-building.

== History ==
Opus Kink formed in 2017. They released the double A-side "Faster Than the Radio / Mosquito" in 2019 which was produced by Liam Watson at Toe Rag Studios in East London and released through the band's own label, Hideous Mink Records. During the 2020 lockdown, they released a Bandcamp-only EP, Requiem for a Quarantaine.

Tim Burgess then produced two singles at Rockfield Studios. They then went on to release "Wild Bill" and "This Train" through Nice Swan Records.

Jack Banjo Courtney joined the band in late 2021 just before the recording of their second EP Til the Stream Runs Dry at Rockfield Studios.

In 2022, they released the EP Til the Stream Runs Dry. They released the singles "Dust" and "1:18", from their latest EP in 2023, with Brighton Sextet describing their music as "a loose collection of dream and nightmare sequences." On 19 May 2023, their EP My Eyes, Brother! was released.

The band released their debut album The Sweet Goodbye on 31 July 2026 through SO Recordings. The album's lead single "Come Over, Do Me Wrong" was released on 30 March 2026.

== Musical style ==
Opus Kink has been described as post-punk, no wave and jazz punk. Their sound is infused with a wide range of influences including country, Latin, gothic, choral, folk, French chanson, rock and roll, garage rock and more.

== Discography ==
=== Albums ===
- The Sweet Goodbye (2026)

=== EPs ===
- Requiem for a Quarantaine (2020)
- Til the Stream Runs Dry (2022)
- My Eyes, Brother! (2023)

=== Singles ===
- "Faster Than the Radio" / "Mosquito" (2019)
- "Wild Bill" (2021)
- "This Train" (2021)
- "I Love You, Baby" (2022)
- "The Unrepentant Soldier" (2022)
- "Dog Stay Down" (2022)
- "Dust" (2023)
- "1 : 18" (2023)
- "Children" (2023)
- "Piping Angels" (2023)
- "I Wanna Live with You" (2024)
- "I'm a Pretty Showboy" (2025)
- "Come Over, Do Me Wrong" (2026)
- "Low Roader" (2026)
