= Love Ends Disaster! =

- Origin: East Midlands, England
- Genres: Indie rock Alternative
- Years active: 2003–2012
- Members: Matthew Oakes; Matthew Dix; Jonathan Dix; Rob Sadler; Pete Jones; Matthew Waterfield; Mark Thorley
- Website: www.loveendsdisaster.com

Love Ends Disaster! were an English experimental indie rock band, heralding from Nottingham and Loughborough, England.

== Career ==
Love Ends Disaster! formed whilst at University in Loughborough and Nottingham. After recording their first pop demo with two swinging microphones and an Alba tape deck in a Victorian meat warehouse in Nottingham, they were picked up by Denial Records, the record label behind the first studio recordings of Bloc Party. Two critically acclaimed and successful EPs followed, Stories For The Dislocated and Faster, Faster, drawing comparisons with Talking Heads, British Sea Power, The Only Ones, Radiohead and Sonic Youth. They found themselves sharing stages with These New Puritans, Youthmovies, Yo La Tengo and Babyshambles.

The band performed on the 2008 Summer Sundae Main Stage with Supergrass and The Coral, and performed in the Big Top Tent supporting Ash, during the Nottingham Splendour Festival in 2009. Debut album, City of Glass, was released on 26 July 2010 on Warning! Records.

The singles, "Ladders" and "Suzanne" were very much a favourite of both Colin Murray and Huw Stephens on BBC Radio 1, and gained regular rotation on XFM, whilst the quite rude track "There's Room In My Tardis For Two" has been played by Tom Robinson on BBC Radio 6.

Love Ends Disaster! played the Reading and Leeds Festival on 27 and 28 August 2010 on the BBC Introducing Stage.

The band split in April 2012.

== Press ==
"City of Glass is an agitated, ambitious record both beautiful and unsettling. It shows love ends disaster! as a band loaded with ideas, not afraid to embrace the twists and turns of creativity."

"...The debut 5 track CD E.P. from Love Ends Disaster! has the same listening sensation we got when we heard the first Bloc Party 7". It's 5 sharp 3 minute bursts of post punk that recall the jangling guitars of the Postcard-era / The Wedding Present, the vocals of Pete Murphy from bauhaus, the melodies of the Psychedelic Furs and in track 5 they have the new 'Killing an Arab' for this generation. Within the year this band will be massive. We've not been wrong before." "...Ladies and gentlemen let me give you the first GREAT single of 2005.... every song on the E.P. could quite easily stand up as a single in its own right, and since Oasis' halcyon days of the mid-90s not many artists can claim to have matched quantity with quality."

"...Love Ends Disaster! meanwhile go from strength to strength with every show. Despite the Bloc Party endorsements and rave reviews picked up by last year’s ‘Stories For The Dislocated EP’, it’s fair to say neither of these do the band justice compared to their captivating live show. Singer Matthew Oakes stares at the front row like a man possessed, pounding to and fro across the stage while his band’s incendiary mash up of angular, punk-pop, jangly ska tunes create a mangle on and off the stage. ‘Ginko Disco’ is a melange of disco punk that recalls Devo at their most eclectic while ‘Warning Robots’, complete with its ‘Red Dwarf’ signature tune middle eight rips through the floor like a jet-powered buzzsaw. If this isn’t their year then I’m a Chinaman…"

== Band members ==
- Matthew Oakes – lead vocals
- Matthew Dix – bass guitar
- Jonathan Dix – guitar
- Robert Sadler – guitar and vocals
- Pete Jones – drums
- Matthew Waterfield – guitar and vocals
- David Wright – drums

== Discography ==
=== Record releases ===
Year	Title	Label	Other information
2005	Stories for the Dislocated	Denial Records	EP
May 2006	Faster, Faster...	Denial Records	EP
March 2007	"Ladders"	Yellow Noise	Single
November 2007	"Suzanne" / "Dinosaur"	This Is Fake DIY	Single
Monday 26 July 2010	City of Glass	Warning!	Album

=== Compilation albums ===
- 2005: Small Town America used the track "Ginko Disco" on Public Service Broadcast no.6
- 2006: Vinyl Junkie Recordings used the track "Ginko Disco" on Sound Of An Era
- 2006: NG Records used the track "Cut Your Hair" on Nottingham (a compilation album of the city's music scene)
- 2008: Selector Series used the track "Dinosaur" on Your New Favourite: Artists to Watch in 2008
- 2009: Tip Toe Records used the track "Ladders" on Tip Toe Records Compilation
