= Thepetebox =

British beatboxer

THePETEBOX
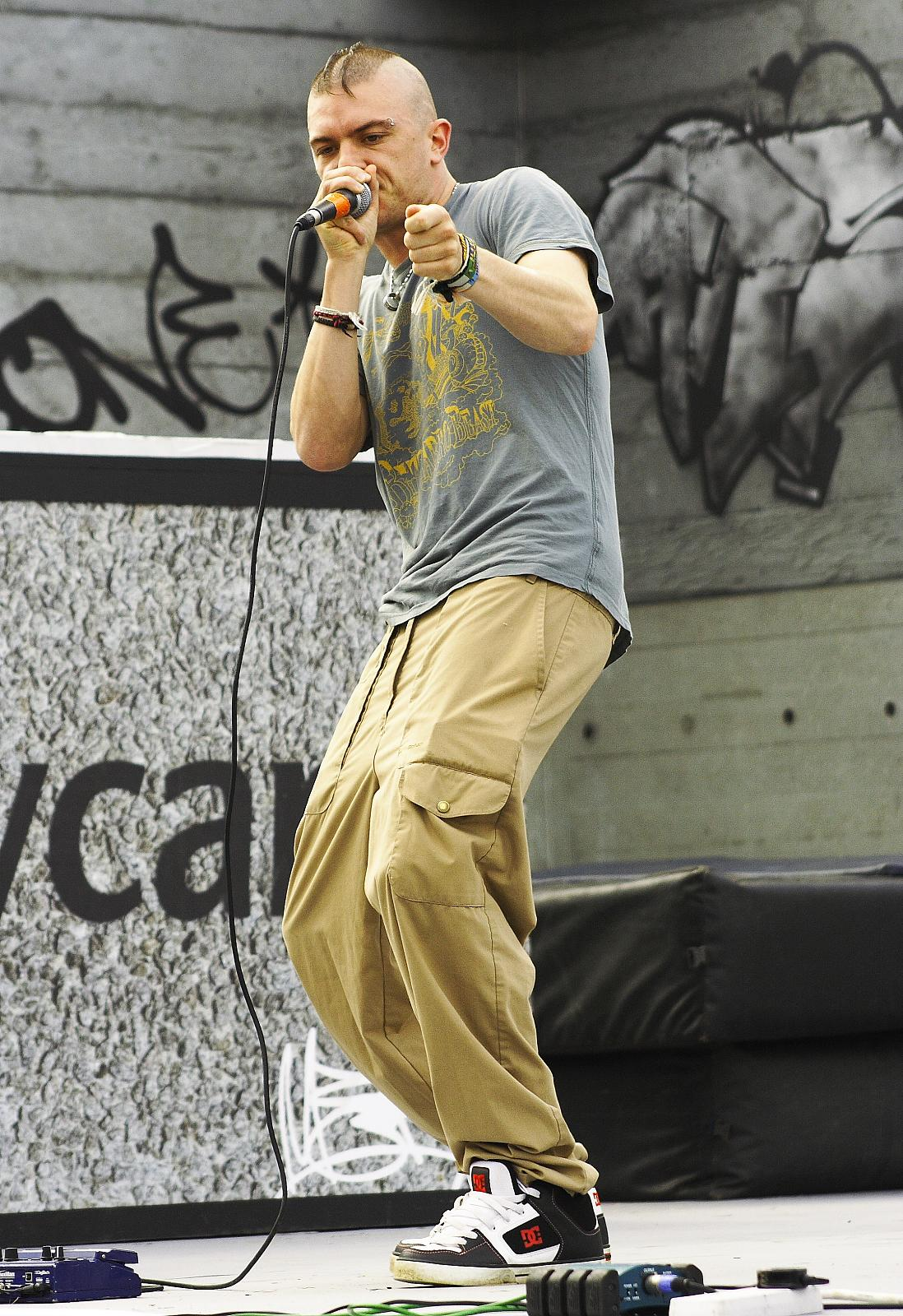
- THePETEBOX at Mayor's Thames Festival 2008

Background information
- Born: Peter Sampson
- Origin: Nottingham, England
- Genres: Beatbox, hip hop
- Years active: 2004–present
- Labels: Izumi Records, Imoto Records
- Formerly of: Swimming, WeShowUpOnRadar
- Website: www.thepetebox.com

Peter Sampson, known professionally as THePETEBOX, is a live looping human beatbox artist from the UK. He was crowned the BBC Radio 1 beatbox champion in 2005.

== Career ==
THePETEBOX uses a loop pedal to create songs using his vocal and beatboxing ability. He won the 2005 BBC Radio 1 Beatbox Championships, and was named as a winner of the year's Channel 4 Talent Awards.

THePETEBOX has toured around the UK, Africa, France, Norway, Czech Republic, and appeared at Isle of Wight, Bestival, V, Leeds, Reading, Latitude, Creamfields and Glastonbury festivals.

In 2007, THePETEBOX featured in a TV advert for Movistar mobile phones. The advert aired in March 2007 in Mexico and will be shown in Panama and Guatemala later in the year. THePETEBOX was also a member of the bands Swimming and WeShowUpOnRadar.

THePETEBOX appeared in the UK and US television coverage of the 2009 World Free Running Championships on 15 August.

Other TV appearances include ITV's Skillicious in 2009, and ITV's Odd One In in 2010. The same year, he toured twice with the dance group Diversity.

THePETEBOX released his debut album Future Loops on 11 April 2012. It is a live, studio album - each track is performed, mixed, effected and recorded live in a studio environment to a stereo mix. This process is filmed, creating a live performance video of the recordings themselves.

In 2023, THePETEBOX participated on the twelfth series of The Voice UK on Team will.i.am and finished as a semi-finalist.

== Discography ==
- Future Loops (2012)
- Live to Tape 001 (2013)
- Songs from the Vaults (2017)
- The Strings (2018)
- Use The Fire (2018)
