= Mint na Bokura =

Manga series

- We are Mint
- Cover of the first tankōbon volume

ミントな僕ら (Mint na Bokura)
- Genre: Romantic comedy
- Manga
- Written by: Wataru Yoshizumi
- Published by: Shueisha
- Magazine: Ribon
- Original run: May 1997 – December 28, 1999
- Volumes: 6

Mint na Bokura (ミントな僕ら; "Minty Us") is a Japanese manga series by Wataru Yoshizumi. The story centers on the life of a pair of 14-year-old twins. It was initially published in the July 1997 issue of Ribon Comics until February 2000. It is completed in 6 volumes. However, it was compiled into 16 volumes in the Spanish version. It is licensed in French by Glénat, in Spain by Planeta DeAgostini Comics, and in Taiwan by Sharp Point Press.

== Plot ==
Mint na Bokura is a light-hearted romance manga about fraternal twins, Noel and Maria Minamino (who happen to be very close to each other), and various love situations that occur around them. When Maria falls for an older guy and transfers to his school to be closer to him, Noel – who seems to love his sister a "bit" too much – is struck by extreme jealousy. To make things worse, the school that Maria has transferred to is a boarding school, which will cause him to no longer be able to hang out with her. Since Noel won't stand a chance, he decides to enter Maria's new school and persuade her to come back. But there is one major problem: the only open admission left is in the girl's dorm! Supposedly, that fact alone is enough to deter any normal, proud guy. But Noel seems to be anything but that—especially when it concerns his beloved sister. Armed with a half-wig, a headband, a pair of spats, and a padded bra, Noel resolutely disguises as a girl and begins his new life in Morinomiya Boarding School.

== Characters ==
=== Main characters ===
Noel Minamino (南野のえる, Minamino Noeru)
The main character. Noel is a gregarious 14-year-old boy who seems to suffer from extreme sister complex. Learning of his beloved twin's sudden transfer to a different school, he determinedly follows her and plans to have her break up with her new "love" so that they can be together again. However, Noel finds out that the school no longer has any open spots for male transferees. So, refusing to be discouraged by such minor inconveniences, he disguises himself as a female to be admitted. Aggressive and temperamental, Noel can also be very forward and playful. He is awfully possessive and protective of Maria, and gives deadly glares to anyone who makes a move on her. Even as a "girl", he nonchalantly retains his boyish behaviour, such as referring to himself as "ore" over the girly "atashi". His disguise consists of a half-wig that resembles Maria's long hair, a headband/bandana, a pair of suppatsu (spats) worn underneath his school skirt and a padded bra he "borrowed" from Maria.
Maria Minamino (南野まりあ, Minamino Maria)
Maria is a typical 14-year-old school girl. She falls in love with an older guy and transfers to the school he goes to be closer to him, which devastates her twin brother, Noel, to the point that he swallows his manly pride by imposing as a girl to be with her. Of course, she is quite indignant to this, knowing full well that Noel will only disrupt her chances of getting together with her new love. She seems to feel suffocated with her twin's affection and over-protectiveness towards her, but she still loves him, no matter how annoying and frustrating he may be at times. Feminine and perky in nature, she can be a bit gullible at times and tends to be quick to judge. She can also be quite superficial and is repeatedly developing shallow crushes on different boys (a character trait that made her unpopular in fan polls, which in fact, is noted by Noel at one point), but she really is a very sweet girl who generally understands the sensitivity of other people's hearts. It is revealed that Maria is a popular figure in her new and old school and many guys are crushing on her, much to her twin's displeasure. She is a valued member of Morinomiya's girls' basketball team.
Ryuuji Sasa (佐々大海, Sasa Ryūji)
The ace player of Morinomiya's boys' basketball team and is one of the school's campus crushes. He is a cool and easygoing guy who acts indifferent toward his admirers, saying he doesn't have any interest in girls. This 'phobia' actually has a history of its own, which was revealed later in the manga. A natural sportsman, he is a complete fishing maniac. For the first time he meets the "girl" Noel, Sasa is instantly befuddled by his assertiveness, casually calling him by his name, and even mindlessly asking him for the favor of making him the team's manager - just so he can look after his sister more. He realizes that Noel is very different from the stereotypical girls in school and soon falls in love with him, much to Noel's distress and Maria's amusement. However, when Noel reveals his secret to him, he is mortified, but after a moment of shock, he decides to continue being friends with him. To help Noel conceal his true identity, they pose as a couple. His friendship with Noel also leads to him developing some concern toward Maria, which eventually turns into something much deeper.
Miyu Makimura (牧村ゆ, Makimura Miyu)
Noel's quiet, serious and secretive roommate. Miyu is a bit of a loner and sometimes stays out until very late at night. At first, she appears unfriendly to Noel, but eventually becomes good friends with him when he helps her with her 'bug problems', which is actually a prank Noel thoughtlessly pulled on her. Miyu, despite what people think of her, is actually a very nice and pleasant girl. There are many rumors about her circulating in school, such as her being involved with a much older man. While she seems apathetic to the issue, Noel becomes worried and even goes as far as to spy on her during one of her gimmicks, bringing a disgruntled Sasa with him. When things are eventually settled, Noel – with the help of Maria – realizes that he may actually like Miyu as more than a friend, and it becomes evident that Miyu is the girl who is able to distract him from his unhealthy obsession with his sister. Due to a past experience, Miyu holds a deep resentment toward liars, which poses as a huge problem to cross-dresser Noel and his growing feelings toward her. It is also discovered later on in the story that she and Sasa share are cousins.

=== Secondary characters ===
Kazuaki Hirobe (広部和明, Hirobe Kazuaki)
Although a secondary character, Hirobe is undoubtedly the key person in the story for being the one who initiated the whole fiasco. He is Maria's love interest, the main reason for her sudden school transfer. The coach of Morinomiya's basketball team, he is described as good-looking, mature, kind and compassionate. Noel seems to dislike him for taking his beloved twin away from him, and is always finding a way to ruin Maria's attempts to get closer to him. When Maria is finally able to confess to him, she is disappointed to find out that he already has a girlfriend. Noel subsequently rejoices at this, but Maria is still determined to win Hirobe's heart, which instantly makes his plans of bringing Maria back home go up in smoke. Hirobe is an alumnus of Morinomiya and is currently attending Keiou University as a 2nd year college student.
Yoshiaki Hirobe (広部義明, Hirobe Yoshiaki)
Hirobe's younger brother, Yoshiaki is the captain of Hino's basketball team, Morinomiya's rival school, and is a year older than Noel and the others. Upon meeting Maria for the first time, he immediately asks her out, which obviously sparks extreme fury and jealousy from Noel. Maria is unimpressed at first, but after hearing from Hirobe that Yoshiaki has liked her since the first time he saw her picture, she decides to date him. Yoshiaki has the looks and personality that every girl dreams of in a guy, and Maria is really happy to have a boyfriend like him. On the other hand, Noel's hatred toward him seems to grow every time he sees him all lovey-dovey with his sister. However, when he finally realizes how much Maria likes Yoshiaki, he begrudgingly steps back, but only after he makes Yoshiaki promise *never* to hurt Maria. All is well after that, but seeing as Yoshiaki is a delightful young man, there will surely be a rival that will pop up and try to ruin his seemingly perfect relationship with Maria.
Akira Nakayama (中山彰, Nakayama Akira)
A senior high school student, Akira is 2 years older than Noel and the rest. While her looks are noteworthy, her personality is deadly and calculating, and she makes her appearance in the manga as a threat to Maria. She is someone who knows full well what she wants and will go to great lengths to obtain it, with no care for whoever she hurts or steps on in the process. At the time she appears, she has her eyes set on Yoshiaki. Initially, Maria is determined not to back down from her, but her resolve crumbles when she learns that Akira holds a history with Yoshiaki; they are childhood friends, and Yoshiaki actually loved Akira! Thus, Akira is able to bring back what is 'rightfully' hers, and Maria is left to experience her first major heartbreak. She is interested in Sasa as well, although Sasa clearly dislikes her for bullying Noel's twin.
Kanako Asou (麻生可奈子, Aso Kanako)
Kanako is a chipper lass who is always on the lookout for the coolest guys in school. She is originally Maria's roommate, but became Miyu's when Miyu discovers Noel's true identity. In a fit of anger, she tells Maria to exchange rooms with her, to which Maria wordlessly agrees, already knowing what probably happened. Like any student unfamiliar with Miyu, Kanako is initially wary of her, but soon befriends her after realizing that she's actually a nice girl. Sympathetic and easy to talk to, it is evident that she and Maria are very good friends, seeing as she's always with Maria whenever she is depressed with something, listening to her problems and giving her advice. Kanako seems to have a crush on Sasa, and later on, with Tooru - who is actually Noel posing as the twins' cousin. She is also a member of Morinomiya's girls' basketball team.
Daisuke Sakurai (桜井大輔, Sakurai Daisuke)
Daisuke is a student from Noel and Maria's old school, Higashiyama Jr. High. When he learns that Noel has acquired a new best friend in the form of Sasa, he becomes quite jealous and instantly forms some sort of a rivalry with him. Nevertheless, Daisuke is a good guy. He's in love with Maria, and is distressed when he finds out that she already has a boyfriend (Yoshiaki). However, he gets his chance to date her after the two break up, and he becomes Maria's 2nd boyfriend in the manga. Their relationship isn't very romantic at all; despite Daisuke's total devotion, Maria doesn't seem to return his feelings in the same degree, and neglects (albeit unintentionally) her job as a girlfriend, like celebrating his birthday with him. Eventually, he breaks up with her, seeing no possible chances of ever making Maria love him the way he wants her to. Daisuke is also a good basketball player.
Karin Tachihara (立原果林, Tachihara Karin)
Like Daisuke, Karin attends Noel and Maria's former school. Rather stubborn and strong-willed, Karin has a crush on Noel and will do anything to win him over. She is saddened upon finding out that Noel already has a girl he likes in his new school, then gets angry when he tells her that the girl doesn't regard him the same way. Despite her tendency to act impulsively, Karin is actually very sharp; it didn't take long for her to realize that Noel is hiding something from her. Having no other choice, Noel then tells her the truth and she threatens to expose his secret unless he goes out with her. Of course, she doesn't really mean it. After making Noel dress up in his girl disguise in front of her (as some sort of punishment for rejecting her), she finally lets go of Noel and even wishes him good luck - albeit in a teasing manner.
Chris Jirou (次郎栗栖, Jiro Kurisu)
The lead vocalist of Morinomiya's famous band "Embrasse Moi". Flamboyant, expressive and narcissistic, he enjoys the constant attention given to him by his groupies, and often acts overly confident because of this. Accustomed to girls adoring and pursuing him, he has an unusual penchant for girls who act mean and uninterested toward him. When he meets Noel (disguised as a girl), he immediately becomes infatuated. He is very persistent with his "Honey", and goes to great lengths just to make Noel fall for him. Of course, Noel always ignores his advances, which only intensifies Chris's fondness for him. He dislikes Sasa for the fact that he's Noel's 'boyfriend', and later this hatred grows to immense heights when Sasa steals the title of "Most Popular Student" from him. After ultimately getting rejected by Noel, Chris falls in love with Miyu, much to Noel's horror. Later on, he discovers Noel's secret, and with the help of an oblivious Kanako, proceeds to fool him into doing all sorts of things that will expose his true identity, although his schemes seem to backfire on him horribly. In the end, he falls for Kanako after she expresses her disappointment with him for trying to destroy Noel and being a huge jerk.
Ririko Iwasaki (岩崎理々子, Iwasaki Ririko)
Ririko is a friendly and outgoing girl who takes an immediate liking to Sasa upon meeting him and Noel in Harakuju. Due to her circle of friends consisting of mostly guys, she has come to be very direct and open with her feelings. She asks Sasa to be her boyfriend approximately an hour after they initially met, and while Sasa seems to be a bit apprehensive about it, he still decides to consider it. A huge sports and fishing fanatic, Noel regards Ririko as someone who can be Sasa's ideal girl, so it comes as no surprise to him that Sasa eventually resolves to take Ririko's offer. However, their relationship is short-lived; Sasa meekly admits that even though she possesses the qualities he looks for in a girl, he can never make himself date her because he already has his heart set on someone else. Ririko is undeniably upset, but decides to be a good sport and remains his friend despite this.

== Volumes ==
=== Japanese ===
1. ISBN 4-08-856058-2 published on January 19, 1998
2. ISBN 4-08-856099-X published on September 19, 1998
3. ISBN 4-08-856125-2 published on February 20, 1999
4. ISBN 4-08-856152-X published on July 20, 1999
5. ISBN 4-08-856179-1 published on December 12, 1999
6. ISBN 4-08-856199-6 published on April 19, 2000
