= List of Marmalade Boy chapters =

The first tankōbon volume of Marmalade Boy, released in Japan by Shueisha on December 12, 1992

Marmalade Boy is a manga series written by Wataru Yoshizumi. The first chapter premiered in the May 1992 issue of Ribon where it was serialized monthly until its conclusion in the October 1995 issue. The series follows the rocky romance between step-siblings Miki Koishikawa and Yuu Matsuura, who meet after their parents swap partners.

The 39 unnamed chapters were collected and published in eight tankōbon volumes by Shueisha starting on December 12, 1992; the last volume was released on February 20, 1996. Shueisha later republished the series in six special edition volumes. The first special edition volume was released on March 15, 2004, and new volumes were published monthly until the final volume was released on August 11, 2004. The manga was adapted into a 76-episode anime series by Toei Animation that aired in Japan on Asahi TV and Fuji TV from March 13, 1994, to September 3, 1995. The manga series is licensed for regional language releases by Glénat in France, by Grupo Editorial Vid in Mexico, by Planeta DeAgostini in Spain, by Planet Manga in Italy, and by Egmont Publishing in Germany.

Marmalade Boy was licensed for an English language release in North America by Tokyopop. The individual chapters were serialized by the company's manga anthology, Smile, from December 2001 through April 2002. Tokyopop released the first collected volume of the series on April 23, 2002, and released new volumes monthly until the final volume was released on August 5, 2003. It was one of the first manga series that Tokyopop released in the original Japanese orientation, in which the book is read from right to left, and with the original sound effects left in place. Tokyopop's volumes of the series are out of print. Shueisha refused to renew the company's license of the series after becoming part-owner of rival publisher Viz Media. At Anime Expo 2022, Seven Seas Entertainment announced that they licensed the series for English publication in collector's edition format.

== Volume list ==
=== Original edition ===
No.	Original release date	Original ISBN	English release date	English ISBN
1	December 8, 1992	4-08-853641-X	April 23, 2002	1-931514-54-2
Chapters 1–5
Miki Koishikawa's parents return from a vacation in Hawaii with news that they plan to divorce and switch partners with the Matsuuras, a couple they met there. Miki opposes the decision and tries to change both couples' minds. She hopes the Matsuura's son Yuu will help, but he gives his parents his approval, so Miki grudgingly gives her blessing as well. The two families move into a single house and Yuu transfers to Miki's school. During gym class, Miki remembers how her best male friend Ginta rejected her in middle school. Lost in her daydream, Miki gets hit in the face with a basketball. Yuu comes to check on her in the nurse's office, and, while Miki pretends to sleep, he kisses her. The next day, he does not act differently, so Miki pretends she does not know what he did. While Miki is on a date with Yuu at an amusement park, the two run into Arimi, Yuu's former girlfriend. After Arimi leaves, Yuu tells Miki he knows she was awake when he kissed her and that he likes her. Miki thinks he is teasing her and slaps him before running off. After hearing about their date, a jealous Ginta kisses Miki after school. Furious, Miki slaps him, then refuses to talk to him. While avoiding him after school the next day, she sees Arimi waiting for Yuu after school and drags her off as cover to lose Ginta. Miki treats her to tea to apologize, so Arimi tells Miki about her three-month relationship with Yuu and that she does not intend to give him up. Ginta is waiting for Miki when she gets home, where he explains what really happened back in middle school, then tells her he has always loved her.
2	June 15, 1993	4-08-853668-1	June 25, 2002	1-931514-55-0
Chapters 6–10
On the advice of her best friend Meiko, Miki gets Ginta to agree to give her more time to consider his confession. Meanwhile, Ginta's partner, who is in an upcoming tennis invitational, has to drop out after injuring himself. Miki convinces Yuu to play, as he used to be in the tennis club at his old school. Determined to win, Ginta hounds Yuu to practice a lot for the game. Yuu climbs through the window in the school library to avoid him. While hiding there, he overhears Meiko and their teacher Namura kissing. Meiko discovers him there when Namura is called away but Yuu agrees he will not tell, though he wonders if Miki knows. On the day of the tournament, Yuu learns the other team is from his old school. One of their players, Rokutanda, is Ginta's cousin. He considers both Ginta and Yuu to be his rivals and ends up getting them to agree that the losers will shave their heads. While they talk, Rokutanda loudly blurts out Ginta and Miki's misunderstanding from middle school. Furious at Ginta for telling someone about the incident, Miki yells at him and runs off. Despondent over Miki, Ginta plays terribly in the tournament. His team is close to losing, but Miki returns. With Miki back, Ginta and Yuu come from behind to win. Afterwards, Arimi drags Ginta off under the pretense of getting to know him. They make a plan to pretend to date in order to make Miki jealous so she will go back to loving Ginta and Yuu will be free to for Arimi to pursue. Six months after their divorce, Yuu and Miki's parents officially marry their new partners and go on a two-week honeymoon, leaving Yuu and Miki alone in the house.
3	October 15, 1993	4-08-853692-4	September 17, 2002	1-931514-56-9
Chapters 11–14
Ginta gives Miki an ultimatum about Arimi, but it backfires as Miki tells him to be happy. His guilt becomes too much for him and he tells her the truth. Miki is relieved and Ginta promises again to wait for her answer, allowing them to return to their usual teasing and friendship. Later, word gets out about Meiko having an affair with Namura, resulting in her suspension from school. Miki goes to talk to her, and Meiko explains that she had gone to his place to escape another of her parents' fights. Miki is hurt that Meiko felt she could not go to Miki's house, and then Meiko lashes out at her when Miki asks why she never told her. Miki runs home crying. The next day, Namura tells his class that he has resigned and is returning to Hiroshima to work at his father's real estate business. He calls Meiko to tell her, and breaks up with her, telling her he is not strong enough to make her happy. Meiko goes to Miki's house and after telling her how she and Namura became a couple, she apologizes for what she had said before. She leaves and goes to the train station intending to leave with Namura, but he rebuffs her, tells her to forget him, and leaves her behind. Miki and Yuu, who were following Meiko, arrive after he is gone. As Meiko cries in Miki's arms, Namura is seen crying on the train. After her suspension, Meiko returns to school. In the library, Yuu has a strange encounter with another male student who invites Yuu to his house. When Yuu learns his name is Satoshi Miwa, he goes to find him and accept his invitation.
4	April 15, 1994	4-08-853726-2	November 12, 2002	1-931514-57-7
Chapters 15–19
While the entire family is on a weekend vacation in Karizawa, Yuu sneaks out to meet Satoshi. Miki sees them in the hotel lobby, but when he yells at him about him sneaking off, Yuu roughly grabs her arm and warns her not to tell anyone. Later, Satoshi tricks Meiko into going on a date with him, blackmailing her by promising to tell her the truth about his and Yuu's relationship. When he walks her home, though, he only tells her that their relationship has to do with Satoshi's father, before stealing a kiss and leaving. The next day, Miki and Meiko follow Yuu and Satoshi as they go to meet with Satoshi's father, Yoshimitsu Miwa, a well-known architect. Meiko believes Yuu wanted to meet Mr. Miwa because of his own interest in architecture, which Miki was unaware he had. When Yuu comes home that evening, Miki asks if he likes architecture, but he hurts her feelings by saying that his interests have nothing to do with her. During a class trip to Hokkaidō, Miki loses track of her group. She runs into Yuu but before they can work out the disagreement, Arimi interrupts them. After Miki leaves, so does Arimi. Ginta asks why and Arimi tells him she has given up on Yuu. Ginta admits that he also has come to realize he no longer has a chance with Miki. That night, Yuu is able to apologize to Miki and explains the real reason for his interest in Mr. Miwa. He believes he is not really his father's son, but the son of his mother Chiyako's old boyfriend, Satoshi's father. Some time later, Miki goes with Yuu and Satoshi to confront Satoshi's father only to learn that he was not the one who got Chiyako pregnant.
5	September 14, 1994	4-08-853752-1	February 18, 2003	1-59182-071-5
Chapters 20–24
Disheartened to learn Mr. Miwa is not really his father, Yuu goes to a nearby beach to think. Miki follows and holds him. Afterwards, he tells her how he found out he was not Youji's real son. Miki encourages him to forget it because he has a great family and he has her. They confess their love to one another and share a kiss. At school, Miki tells Ginta that she and Yuu are a couple, and explains that her confusion came from a fear of losing Ginta's friendship. Ginta accepts her feelings and promises they will always be friends. Yuu also meets with Arimi, who tells him that she is happy for him and waits until she is alone to cry. When Ginta later runs into Arimi, he finds himself wanting to hold her as they talk about their mutual rejections. Rumi convinces Yuu to act in a perfume commercial, in which he stars opposite Suzu Sakuma, a popular new model and Satoshi's cousin. After the commercial filming is done, Suzu has Satoshi hire Yuu to be her tutor. Miki worries that Suzu has a crush on him, but Yuu assures her that Suzu is just a kid who likes pretty things. Suzu asks to meet Miki, but seems disappointed at her "plainness." Yuu and Miki make plans to take a vacation in the summer so he can look at architecture. To help with the expenses, Miki gets a part-time job at Bobson's Ice Cream Parlor. While retrieving a container of ice cream from a high shelf, Miki is startled by the appearance of a stranger and falls, landing on the boy. Embarrassed, Miki apologizes and quickly takes the ice cream to the front as the boy picks up the bracelet Yuu gave her from the floor.
6	February 15, 1995	4-08-853780-7	April 8, 2003	1-59182-190-8
Chapters 25–29
Miki meets, Kei Tsuchiya, the co-worker who startled her the day before. Miki asks if he has seen her bracelet, but he denies it. Ginta, thinking Murai and Arimi are dating, sees Murai with another girl and punches him for cheating. When Ginta goes to warn Arimi, he is embarrassed to learn that Murai and Arimi have never dated. Arimi is touched by Ginta's being angry at the thought she would be hurt again. At work, Miki nearly faints, but Kei catches her and steals a hug. Suzu sees the embrace and thinks Miki is cheating on Yuu. Later, under the false impression that Meiko is in love with Yuu, Suzu sets up Yuu and Meiko on a "date" so she can take a picture of them together to show Miki. Miki is upset that she did not know about the outing. That night, Yuu goes to Bobson's to surprise Miki, but she had already left. Kei shows him the bracelet, claiming Miki asked him to throw it away. At home, Yuu confronts Miki about Kei, accusing her of being "clueless" and flirting with the younger boy. Miki, in turn, demands an explanation of his date with Meiko. They end up arguing and in the morning, Yuu leaves for their trip by himself. Miki retrieves her bracelet from Kei. When he says he loves her and needs her to get back on his feet, she slaps him and tells him to stop acting like a spoiled child. Yuu calls Miki the day before he returns and they apologize to one another. The next day, Miki goes to pick him up at the train station and they happily embrace. Ginta and Arimi express their love for one another, officially becoming a couple. Meiko decides to go to Hiroshima to see Namura. Miki agrees to go with her.
7	August 8, 1995	4-08-853809-9	June 17, 2003	1-59182-191-6
Chapters 30–34
While Miki waits nearby, Meiko and Namura talk. At first, he refuses to resume their relationship, saying he does not want to tie her down. After Meiko promises not to bother him again, but that she will always love only him, Namura is unable to refuse anymore. Embraces her, he admits he was holding back thinking it would be best for her. He passionately kisses her before proposing. Meiko says yes and they make plans to marry after she graduates. A week after Miki returns home, Chiyako's adopted brother Eisaku comes to visit. After learning that Eisaku was in love with Chiyako, Yuu asks if he is his real father. Eisaku says he is not and assures Yuu that he really is Youji's son. At home, Yuu and Miki discuss the upcoming holidays. Miki asks Yuu for a ring for Christmas. A few days later, Yuu discovers that his and Miki's parents not only knew each other in college, but that they were in the same pairings as they are now. Yuu is horrified to realize that Jin was Chiyako's old boyfriend, making Miki his half-sister. When he and Miki meet on Christmas Eve to exchange presents, he tells her he no longer loves her and breaks up with her. Before leaving, he gives her the ring he had promised as her gift. Heartbroken, Miki spends the night crying at Meiko's. Unable to continue living in the same house with Miki, Yuu takes the exam for the Kyoto Institute of Technology, moving there three months after passing it. When he leaves, Miki gives him a watch, which she had bought him for Christmas. Afterwards, she cries again, and then puts away everything he gave her before going into town to get her haircut and her ears pierced.
8	February 15, 1996	4-08-853839-0	August 5, 2003	1-59182-192-4
Chapters 35–39; Bonus Section; The Inside Story of Marmalade Boy; The Inside Story of Marmalade Boy II
Unable to forget Yuu, Miki goes to Kyoto to talk to him. After running into him on campus, she tells him she still loves him and cannot live without him. Yuu rejects her by lying and introducing a classmate as his girlfriend. Miki apologizes for bothering them and leaves, crying on the train ride home. Yuu avoids going home to visit until he believes Miki has gotten over him. During the visit, Yuu asks Miki if she has a new boyfriend, but she tells him no as she still loves him. Upset, Yuu tells her he does not want it like that. Miki yells at him for trying to take those feelings from her too, and turns away so he will not see her cry. Unable to keep up the deception anymore, he hugs her and explains the real reason he broke up with her. They decide to be a couple "one last time" and take a trip to Kyushu. Miki wears the bracelet and ring he had given her and they spend the day sight seeing. That night at the hotel, they stand in the hall, unable to go to their separate rooms. As they look at each other, Miki starts crying and throws herself into Yuu's arms. Yuu pulls her into his room and kisses her, then asks her to marry him. Though they realize society will not approve and that they will be unable to have children together, they agree that they cannot be apart anymore. Back at home, they confront their parents and ask permission to get married though they know they are blood siblings. Chiyako tells Yuu that he was wrong; he is Youji's real son. She had gotten pregnant by Jin, but lost the baby due to a miscarriage. With the misunderstanding cleared up and their relationship given the okay by their parents, Miki and Yuu happily embrace as a couple.

=== 2008 edition ===
No.	Japanese release date	Japanese ISBN
1	May 16, 2008	978-4-08-618731-2
2	May 16, 2008	978-4-08-618732-9
3	July 18, 2008	978-4-08-618733-6
4	July 18, 2008	978-4-08-618734-3
5	August 8, 2008	978-4-08-618735-0

=== Collector's edition ===
No.	English release date	English ISBN
1	February 14, 2023	978-1-63858-534-3
2	May 16, 2023	978-1-63858-535-0
3	August 15, 2023	978-1-63858-536-7
4	December 12, 2023	978-1-63858-537-4
5	April 9, 2024	978-1-63858-538-1

== See also ==
- List of Marmalade Boy characters
