= Koishikawa (disambiguation) =

Koishikawa may refer to:

== Places ==
- Koishikawa, locality within Bunkyo, Tokyo.

== People ==
- Masahiro Koishikawa (1952–2020), Japanese astronomer

== Astronomy ==
- 6097 Koishikawa, Asteroid named after the astronomer

== Fictional characters ==
- Miki Koishikawa, Marmalade Boy character.
- Jin Koishikawa, Marmalade Boy character.
- Chiyako Koishikawa, Marmalade Boy character.
