= Skip Stellrecht =

American voice and television actor

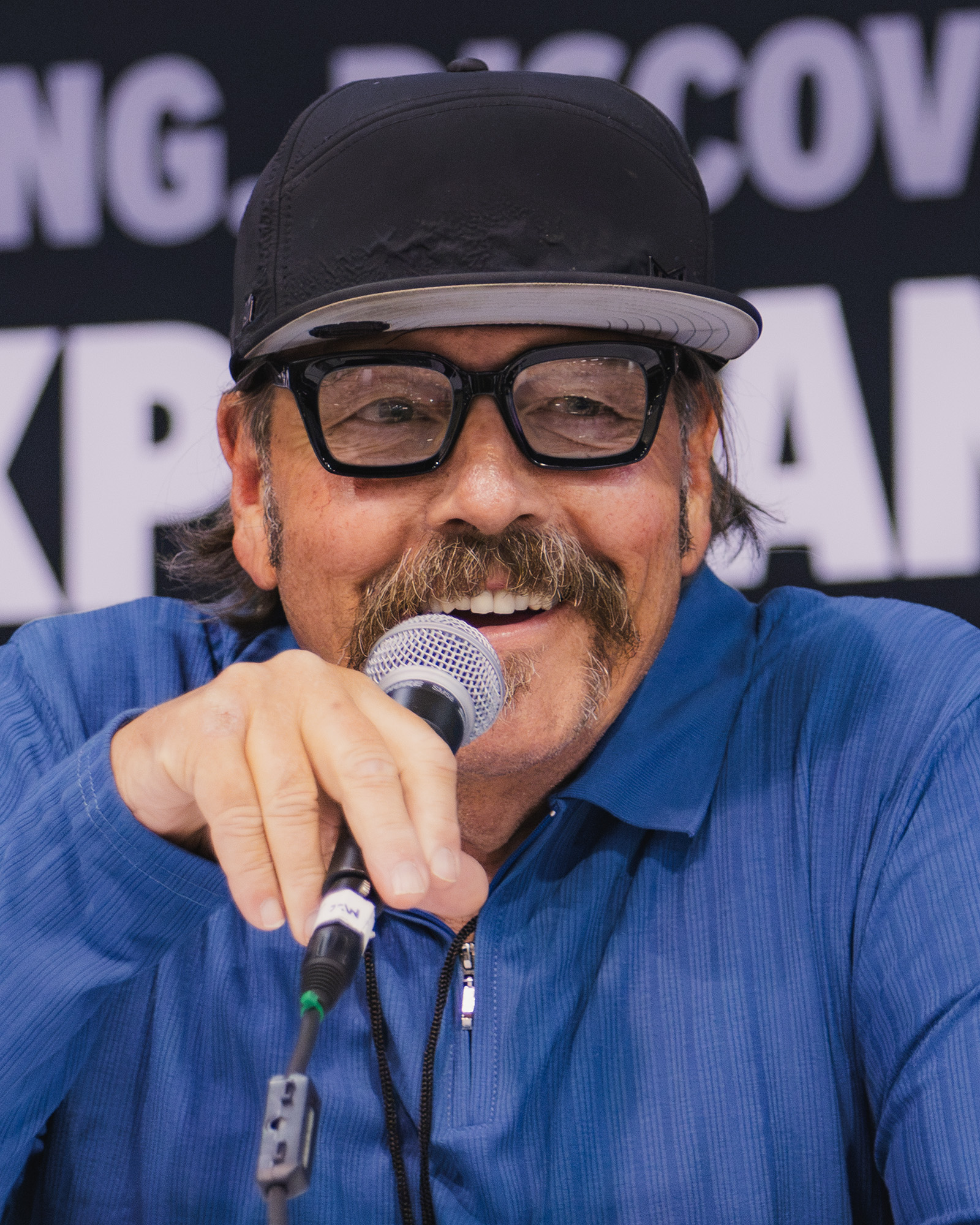
- Stellrecht in 2026
- Born: May 9, 1958 (age 68); Fullerton, California, United States
- Other names: Jack Aubree; Henry D. Grey; Hank Malloy; Hank Smith; Hank Wilspank
- Occupation: Actor
- Years active: 1981–present
- Notable work: Cowboy Bebop; as Vicious; Naruto; as Might Guy; Street Fighter; as Ryu

Henry M. Stellrecht (born May 9, 1958), known professionally as Skip Stellrecht, is an American voice and television actor, who was born and raised in Orange County, California. Growing up with more of an interest in surfing, sports, and music, he did not discover his interest in acting until after graduating from high school. He started with commercials, and soon started studying under the direction of some of the most well-respected teachers in Hollywood. He started auditioning and booking several stage roles throughout the Los Angeles area. and was a founding member of the Friends and Artist Theatre Ensemble.

After several television and movie roles, he stumbled onto voice acting, by mere accident, through a friend, and now has a career in it today. His most notable roles are Might Guy from Naruto, Ryu from the Street Fighter anime adaptations, and Vicious from Cowboy Bebop. He can also be heard in live-action shows as USA's Mr Robot, NBC's Grimm, ABC's Once Upon a Time, and others.

Although voicing several video games throughout his career, Jutah Fate of Silent Bomber is still his favorite.

He has also been credited throughout the years as "Henry Douglas Grey", "Jack Aubree", and "Hank Wilspank".

== Filmography ==
=== Anime ===
- .hack//Liminality – Guard B
- Armitage III – Kevin Oldman/Ross Sylibus
- Brigadoon: Marin & Melan – Detective Wakai (Ep, 6-26, as Jack Aubree)
- Code Geass: Lelouch of the Rebellion – General Katase
- Cowboy Bebop – Vicious (as Henry Douglas Grey)
- Digimon Data Squad – Gaomon/Gaogamon/MachGaogamon/MirageGaogamon
- Dual! Parallel Trouble Adventure – Naoya Shiozaki
- Fushigi Yûgi – Hikitsu
- Ghost in the Shell: Stand Alone Complex – SIU Officer #1
- Giant Robo: The Animation – Tiger Man #2
- Great Teacher Onizuka – Toshiyuki Saejima (Ep. 34–43), Anko's Father (as Jack Aubree)
- Kikaider – Toru, Red Kikaider
- Marmalade Boy – Satoshi Miwa, Shinichi Namura, others (credited as Jack Aubree)
- Mobile Suit Gundam: The 08th MS Team – Lunen
- Naruto – Might Guy, Ningame, Raijin, Itachi Uchiha (Eps. 29–30)
- Naruto: Shippuden – Might Guy, Kagami Uchiha, Captain of the Ghost Ship (Ep. 225)
- Reign: The Conqueror – Dinocrates, Phillipos (as Jack Aubree)
- Sol Bianca: The Legacy – Percy
- Street Fighter II V – Ryu (Animaze Dub)
- They Were Eleven – Thickhead
- Trigun – Benson (Ep. 19)
- Wolf's Rain – Zari

=== Animation ===
- Adventure Time – Policeman (Episode: "Candy Streets"/uncredited)

=== Television ===
- Babylon 5 – Customs Officer, Security Guard, Guard
- Beetleborgs Metallix – Ultimate Conqueror (voice)
- Buffy the Vampire Slayer – Agent Manetti
- China Beach – Cooper
- Confessions: Two Faces of Evil – Officer Harvey
- CSI: Miami – C.O. Winters
- Desperate Housewives – Booking Sergeant
- ER – Chaplain Miller
- Pacific Blue – O'Neill
- Providence – Police Officer
- Prey – Attendant
- Seven Days – Officer
- Sliders – Guard #1
- Star Trek: The Next Generation – Engineering Crewman (Season 1, Episode 2: "The Naked Now")
- The Bold and the Beautiful – Corky
- Tour of Duty – G.I. #2

=== Film ===
- Akira – Additional voices (Animaze Dub; as Henry Douglas Grey)
- Appleseed – Colonel Hades, Kudoh (as Jack Aubree)
- Chameleon – Agent Two
- Dog Man – Ice Cream Building
- Multiplicity – Irate Football Parent
- Street Fighter II: The Animated Movie – Ryu (as Hank Smith)
- Street Fighter Alpha: The Animation – Ryu
- Suburban Commando – Soldier
- Succubus: Hell Bent – Cop #3
- The Nutcracker and the Mouseking – Additional voices
- Tough Guys – Reporter #1
- U.S. Air Marshals – W. Fritz Bean

=== Video games ===
- Medal of Honor: Pacific Assault – Additional voices
- Naruto series – Might Guy
- Red Dead Redemption 2 – The Local Pedestrian Population
- Resident Evil: The Darkside Chronicles – Ben Bertolucci
- The Elder Scrolls Online – Additional voices (uncredited)
