= Handsome na Kanojo =

Manga

- Handsome Girlfriend
- Cover of volume 9 - Mio and Ichiya

ハンサムな彼女 (Handsome na Kanojo)
- Genre: Romantic drama
- Manga
- Written by: Wataru Yoshizumi
- Published by: Shueisha
- Imprint: Ribon Mascot Comics
- Magazine: Ribon
- Original run: November 1988 – January 1992
- Volumes: 9
- Original video animation
- Directed by: Shunji Ooga
- Produced by: Tomoyuki Miyata; Minoru Oono
- Written by: Kei Hiyoshi
- Music by: Takumi Yamamoto
- Studio: J.C.Staff
- Released: September 29, 1991
- Runtime: 36 minutes

Handsome na Kanojo (ハンサムな彼女, Hansamu na Kanojo; lit. "Handsome Girlfriend") is a manga created by Wataru Yoshizumi. It originally ran in the magazine Ribon from 1988 to 1992, and was adapted into an OVA in 1991. The story is a romantic-comedy. It is Yoshizumi's longest serialized manga so far, and is one of her most popular works.

The 9-volume manga also includes Yoshizumi's other works, including her debut manga "Radical Romance."

== Story ==
Mio Hagiwara is a 14-year-old actress who also enjoys being a regular teenager. One day, Mio meets Ichiya Kumagai, a 15-year-old boy who dreams of becoming a top director of films. Although Mio finds Ichiya to be annoying at first, she eventually discovers his soft side and becomes attracted to him. The story follows Mio and Ichiya becoming a couple and pursuing their dreams.

== Characters ==
Mio Hagiwara
Voiced by: Sakiko Tamagawa
A young actress whose life changes after meeting Ichiya. Despite her mature looks, she is a teenager with a good heart. Mio is 17 at the end of the series, and is shown as a 24-year-old in the omake. At first she isn't fond of Ichiya because he called her a "bad actress". After being rejected by Teruomi, Ichiya comforts her and she gradually falls in love with him.
Ichiya Kumagai
Voiced by: Toshihiko Seki
A young, talented director who dreams of becoming Japan's biggest director in movies. Usually shy and quiet, except when it comes to anything about movies. Once he met Mio he instantly got on her bad side by calling her a "bad actress" but later admitted that only the way she expresses her lines was lacking. He first approaches Mio to have her star in his first movie. His mind is mostly only filled with thoughts of directing and movies and he refuses to realize that he likes Mio, even rejecting her when she confessed to him. It's only when he falls off a cliff after a failed stunt that he realizes his feelings for her. In the series omake, he is shown as a 25-year-old.
Aya Sawaki
Voiced by: Hiroko Kasahara
Best friend of Mio. A popular singer. She used to be Ichiya's girlfriend before he left for Hollywood when they were 13 years old. She realizes she still has feelings for Ichiya and becomes love rivals with Mio. She later gives up on him and starts dating Morimoto Teruomi.

== Crossovers in other manga ==
- Some of the characters from Handsome na Kanojo either make appearances or are mentioned in Wataru Yoshizumi's most popular series Marmalade Boy which was her next manga series to be released after Handsome na Kanojo. Mio is actually seen in the anime (although only on various commercials) while Ichiya is mentioned when Yuu goes to New York City to study.

== Volumes ==
1. ISBN 4-08-853486-7
2. ISBN 4-08-853500-6
3. ISBN 4-08-853514-6
4. ISBN 4-08-853526-X
5. ISBN 4-08-853541-3
6. ISBN 4-08-853569-3
7. ISBN 4-08-853587-1
8. ISBN 4-08-853594-4
9. ISBN 4-08-853607-X
