= Hime-chan's Ribbon =

Magical girl manga

- Cover of the first manga volume

姫ちゃんのリボン (Hime-chan no Ribon)
- Genre: Magical girl
- Manga
- Written by: Megumi Mizusawa
- Published by: Shueisha
- English publisher: Shueisha (digital)
- Imprint: Ribon Mascot Comics
- Magazine: Ribon
- Original run: August 1990 – January 1994
- Volumes: 10
- Anime television series
- Directed by: Hatsuki Tsuji
- Written by: Takashi Yamada
- Music by: Kenji Kawai; Gō Suzuki; PROJECT MOONLIGHT CAFE
- Studio: Studio Gallop
- Original network: TXN (TV Tokyo)
- Original run: October 2, 1992 – December 3, 1993
- Episodes: 61
- Manga

Hime-chan no Ribon Colorful
- Written by: Shiho Komiyuno
- Published by: Shueisha
- Magazine: Ribon
- Original run: October 2009 – December 2010
- Volumes: 3

Hime-chan's Ribbon (姫ちゃんのリボン, Hime-chan no Ribon) is a magical girl manga series created by Megumi Mizusawa that was serialized in Ribon Magazine from August 1990 to January 1994. It was later developed into a 61 episode anime series, produced by Studio Gallop, that aired from October 2, 1992, to December 3, 1993. Hajime Watanabe's first project as a character designer was with Hime-chan no Ribbon. The manga series was collected into ten volumes in Japan, where it received a full anime DVD release. A stage musical of the show was produced in December 1993 starring the idol group SMAP. The musical was presented in three episodes, each a week apart. SMAP performed the opening theme and the three ending themes for the anime and each member appears in animated form in episode 13. In 2026, the manga became licensed digitally in English on Shueisha's Manga Million platform, while the anime still remains currently unlicensed in the United States.

== Plot ==
The story is about Himeko Nonohara (野々原姫子 Nonohara Himeko), also known as Hime-chan (姫ちゃん, using the Chinese character for "princess"), an aloof, childlike, yet boasty thirteen-year-old girl who frets over the fact that she is the biggest tomboy in the school. Himeko would like nothing more than to be a proper, feminine young lady, like her older sister Aiko, so that she could approach her secret crush, Hasekura.

One night, Himeko is unexpectedly approached by a girl, who is a near-mirror image of herself, floating outside of her bedroom window. She discovers that the girl is Princess Erika of the Magical Kingdom. Erika explains that people in the Magical Kingdom have an exact counterpart in the Human World and that, in order to prove herself worthy as a princess, she must give Himeko a magical item that she has created. Himeko is allowed the use of this item, a red hair ribbon, for one year to determine whether it is useful, and consequently, if Erika will inherit the crown.

The ribbon allows Himeko to transform into anyone in the Human World for one hour. If Himeko is unable to recite the magic incantation in reverse before the hour is up, she will be trapped in that person's form for the rest of her life. She is unable to reveal the secret of the ribbon and the existence of the Magical Kingdom to anyone. If she does, her memory will be erased as punishment. Assisting her with this is her stuffed lion, Pokota, whom the ribbon brought to life. Erika will watch her in the Magic Kingdom through her crystal ball for one year, at which point the ribbon will be returned.

== Themes ==
In authoring Hime-chan's Ribbon, Megumi Mizusawa used themes common to magical girl manga. The concept of being able to transform into other people had been a feature of Himitsu no Akko-chan (1962).

== Characters ==
Himeko Nonohara (野々原 姫子, Nonohara Himeko)
Voiced by: Ikue Ōtani
Himeko is the protagonist of the series. She progresses from being a tomboy at the beginning of the series to becoming a refined, feminine and mature girl by the series' end. Erika, her counterpart in the Land of Magic is an elegant princess, but warms to Hime-chan's playfulness which often lands them both in trouble with the King and Queen and Erika's magical broom, Chappy.
Himeko had a childhood crush on the much older Hasekura-senpai, but she gradually falls in love with Daichi instead. The name Himeko means "little princess". Hime-chan's motto is "Ike! Ike! Go! Go! Jump!". (Come on, Come on, go, go, jump)
Pokota (ポコ太)
Voiced by: Kazue Ikura
Pokota is Himeko's favorite stuffed animal that is only animate when Himeko is wearing the magic ribbon. He is Himeko's friend and voice of reason, often helping her out of various difficult situations. Daichi was suspicious of Pokota from the first time that he saw him and treated Pokota harshly before he could confirm that Pokota was "alive". Pokota, being a toy has no direct equal in the magic world, but he becomes close friends with a pink cat, Pink-chan.
Daichi Kobayashi (小林 大地, Kobayashi Daichi)
Voiced by: Yū Daiki
Daichi is a trouble maker at Himeko's school. By chance they meet at an abandoned house that Himeko was passing by on her way to give Hasekura-senpai a good luck charm. Daichi, who kept to himself prior to meeting Himeko, begins teasing her initially because of her tomboyish behavior. Daichi warms to Hime-chan and they become friends, eventually falling in love with her. He discovers her secret about the ribbon and Pokota. The King and Queen make an exception to the rule of secrecy for Daichi and he often travels with Himeko to the Land of Magic where Camille is his exact counterpart.
Hikaru Hibino (日比野 ひかる, Hibino Hikaru)
Voiced by: Rin Mizuhara
Hikaru attends the same class as Himeko and Daichi. She shows interest in Daichi and thinks of Hime-chan as her rival. She becomes suspicious of Hime-chan's secretiveness and she comes close to exposing Hime-chan's secret, but always is foiled at the last minute by one of Hime-chan's friends or by Hime-chan herself. Robelia is Hikaru's mirror match from the Land of Magic.
Sei Arisaka / Sei Array (有坂 静 / セイ・アレイ, Arisaka Sei / Sei Arei)
Voiced by: Takehito Koyasu
Sei and his bird, Kantaro are from the Land of Magic. Sei is initially only after Himeko's magic, though after his guise of pretending to be a transfer student is revealed, he befriends Daichi and Hime-chan instead. Hime-chan does not forgive his earlier threatening behavior and rejects Sei's attempts at becoming better acquainted.
Kouichi Hasekura (支倉 浩一, Hasekura Kōichi)
Voiced by: Tsuyoshi Kusanagi
Hasekura takes the same bus and is in the same grade of Himeko's older sister, Aiko, and is a senior student to Hime-chan. Hime-chan's crush goes unnoticed by Hasekura and he falls in love with her older sister instead.
Aiko Nonohara (野々原 愛子, Nonohara Aiko)
Voiced by: Yuri Shiratori
Aiko is Himeko's sister. (All of the females in the family have names that end with "ko" (子)) Hasekura and Aiko fall in love which saddens Hime-chan. Aiko is treated as a role model by both of her younger sisters, particularly Hime-chan who chooses Aiko as her first ever transformation. She is also incredibly beautiful and domesticated.
Yumeko Nonohara (野々原 夢子, Nonohara Yumeko)
Voiced by: Chisa Yokoyama
Yumeko is Aiko and Himeko's younger sister. Her exploits with Daichi's younger brother, Shintaro often cause their older siblings much grief.
Shintaro Kobayashi (小林 森太郎, Kobayashi Shintarō)
Voiced by: Minami Takayama
Shintaro is Daichi's younger brother. He is friends with Yumeko.
Manami Mori (森 愛美, Mori Manami) and Ichiko Kamikura (上倉 一子, Kamikura Ichiko)
Voiced by: Katsuyo Endou (Manami) and Minami Takayama (Ichiko)
Himeko, Manami and Ichiko are best friends. Manami claims ownership of Himeko calling her "My hime-chan". She refers to many things as being "cool" and enjoys cooking. Ichiko is referred to as Ii-chan. She is adept at archery.
Masshi (マッシー, Masshī) and Hiroshi
Voiced by: Chika Sakamoto (Masshi) and Masami Kikuchi (Hiroshi)
Masshi and Hiroshi are mischievous sprites from the Land of Magic. They cause great destruction and are eventually punished by becoming Hime-chan's assistants. They provide Hime-chan new powers through new accessories other than the ribbon. Hiroshi is a fox-like sprite who has the ability to fly. Masshi does not have a fox-like tail, but looks similar and is lifted from place to place by his partner.

== Incantations ==
To perform magic several different incantations are recited. When Hime-chan first receives the ribbon she is told to recite "Parallel, Parallel, (person's name) ni nare". After the excitement of transformation Hime-chan dismisses Erika's important instruction to recite this incantation saying Parallel backwards, "Rurerapa rurerapa motono sugatani nare." which causes her to almost be caught as the Principal of the school forever. Pokota had to remind her of the correct way of pronouncing Rurerapa to avoid this.

Incantation	Effect
Parareru parareru, (name) ni naare!	Transformation into someone else.
Rurerapa rurerapa, moto no sugata ni naare!	Reverts a transformation.
Tinka tinku, tinkuru tinkuru, futari ni naare!	Creates a clone of herself.
Sinka sinku, sinkuru sinkuru, hitori ni naare!	Dispels a clone.
Pikkori pikkora, chiisaku naare!	Reduces size of people and objects.
Rakoppi rikoppi, moto no ōkisa ni naare!	Returns to original size from a small state.
Gurande gurāji, ōkiku naare!	Enlarges size of people and objects.
Jīragu denragu, moto no ōkisa ni naare!	Returns to original size from an enlarged state.
Toppu su ōru, jikan yo tomare!	Stops time.
Bāsu ri ōru, jikan yo modore!	Reverses time.
Fūrudo i furīsu, (object to freeze) yo tomare!	Stops an object.
Raranpa rurunpa ronpappa, rarirurerurara, jikan yo moto ni modore!	Start objects again.

== Episode list ==
No.	Title	Original air date
1	"I've become a magician!" Transliteration: "Mahōtsukai ni Nacchatta!" (Japanese: 魔法使いになっちゃった)	October 2, 1992
A girl named Erika, with long blonde hair and a red ribbon, is having fun flying on a broom, among the clouds high in the night sky. When she emerges from the clouds, a large city far below her comes to view. The girl says that the view from here is great, and she cannot see that from the Land of Magic. Erika replies that she cannot help it because she had to find her copy on Earth to make the experiment with. She also advises her to take great care of herself when using the magic ribbon.
2	"Shock! Senpai's confession" Transliteration: "Shokku! Senpai no Kokuhaku" (Japanese: ショック！先輩の告白)	October 9, 1992
The next day, Hime-chan wakes up getting ready for school, Hime-chan gets up and grabs Pokota to wish him a good morning. But Pokota does not reply, and she realizes that is not wearing the ribbon, Then her younger sister Yumeko sneaks in and spots the cute ribbon on Hime-chan's desk. Hime-chan rushes and grabs the ribbon before her sister, and throws her out, saying she will get dressed and go very soon. Hime-chan, realizing that it was not a dream, quickly puts on the bracelet and the ribbon, and Pokota starts talking immediately. He scolds her for not remembering that she must wear the ribbon for him to be able to talk. But she hugs him hard, with tears of joy, because she was thinking she could not speak to him any more. Suddenly Hime-chan spots Hasekura-senpai in the bus passing by. Hasekura says that is nothing, besides he does not like those kind of guys at all. Hime-chan/Aiko replies, in the Hime-chan's tomboyish style, that she will beat the tar out of him next time. Hasekura is very surprised to hear her speaking that way, so Hime-chan realizes she has given in to her natural self and laughs more girl-ish-ly with embarrassment, saying that is what she would like to do. She still cannot believe she is talking that casually to Hasekura, and remembers she must give him the amulet this time.
3	"Transformed into her Beloved Senpai"; Transliteration: "Akogare no Senpai ni Henshin" (Japanese: あこがれの先輩に変身)	October 16, 1992
4	"Hime-chan transforms into the principal!" Transliteration: "Hime-chan Kōchō ni Naru!" (Japanese: 姫ちゃん校長になる!)	October 23, 1992
Hime-chan is very excited for Hasekura to play the lead role in her school play. When they get to the edge of the school, they climb over the fence, but as Hime-chan is jumping off the fence, the ribbon gets caught in a tree branch and tears.
5	"The powerful girl Hikaru appears" Transliteration: "Buttoburi Shōjo Hikaru Tōjō" (Japanese: ぶっとび少女ひかる登場)	October 30, 1992
6	"Unexpected! Daichi & Daichi"; Transliteration: "Battari! Daichi to Daichi" (Japanese: バッタリ!大地と大地)	November 6, 1992
7	"The secret's revealed?!" Transliteration: "Himitsu ga Bare Chau?!" (Japanese: 秘密がバレちゃう?!)	November 13, 1992
8	"Transform into the Kidnappers!"; Transliteration: "Yūkaihan ni Na~are!" (Japanese: 誘拐犯になぁーれ!)	November 20, 1992
9	"In a pinch! The Erased Memory"; Transliteration: "Pinchi! Kioku ga Kesareru" (Japanese: ピンチ!記憶が消される)	November 27, 1992
10	"I Like You More than Pork Buns"; Transliteration: "Nikuman Yori mo Kimi ga Suki!" (Japanese: 肉まんよりも君が好き!)	December 4, 1992
11	"Ribbon in danger!" Transliteration: "Ribon ga Abunai!" (Japanese: リボンがあぶない!)	December 11, 1992
12	"You said you loved me" Transliteration: "Suki Datte Ittanoni" (Japanese: 好きだっていったのに)	December 18, 1992
13	"The arrival of SMAP"; Transliteration: "SMAP ga Yattekita" (Japanese: SMAPがやって来た)	December 25, 1992
14	"Powerful Hikaru's great guess" Transliteration: "Buttobi Hikaru kara no Mei Suiri" (Japanese: ぶっとびひかるの名推理)	January 8, 1993
15	"Pokota's SOS from a snowy mountain" Transliteration: "Pokota Yukiyama kara SOS" (Japanese: ポコ太雪山からSOS)	January 15, 1993
16	"Hikaru's insight" Transliteration: "Hikaru wa Nan demo Omitōshi" (Japanese: ひかるは何でもお見通し)	January 22, 1993
17	"What! I can't change back" Transliteration: "Ee! Henshin ga Modoranai" (Japanese: エッ!変身がもどらない)	January 29, 1993
18	"I prefer your smiling face" Transliteration: "Kimi wa Egao ga Niatteru" (Japanese: 君には笑顔がにあってる)	February 5, 1993
19	"Lots of chocolate" Transliteration: "Chokorēto ga Gaippai" (Japanese: チョコレートがいっぱい)	February 12, 1993
20	"The idol is trouble" Transliteration: "Aidoru wa Taihen da~a" (Japanese: アイドルはたいへんだあ)	February 19, 1993
21	"Run for your dream" Transliteration: "Yume ni Mukatte Hashire!" (Japanese: 夢に向って走れ!)	February 26, 1993
22	"Go go Granny"; Transliteration: "GOGO Obā-chan" (Japanese: GOGO おばあちゃん)	March 5, 1993
23	"Goodbye to my first love" Transliteration: "Hatsuko ni Sayōnara" (Japanese: 初恋にさようなら)	March 12, 1993
24	"Welcome to the land of magic" Transliteration: "Mahō no Kuni e Yōkoso" (Japanese: 魔法の国へようこそ)	March 19, 1993
25	"Let's go my unrivaled Papa"; Transliteration: "Sore Yuke Boku no Muteki Papa" (Japanese: それゆけボクの無敵パパ)	March 26, 1993
26	"The magnetic female transfer student" Transliteration: "Ki ni naru Kanojō wa Tenkōsei" (Japanese: 気になる彼女は転校生)	April 2, 1993
27	"The story of Daichi's first love!?" Transliteration: "Daichi no Hatsukoi no Gatari!?" (Japanese: 大地の初恋物語!?)	April 9, 1993
28	"Hime-chan's justice!" Transliteration: "Jingi Naki Hime-chan!" (Japanese: 仁義なき姫ちゃん!)	April 16, 1993
29	"Hearts tied by a distant promise" Transliteration: "Kokoro o Tsunagu Tōi Yakusoku" (Japanese: 心をつなぐ遠い約束)	April 23, 1993
30	"Pokota! Run for your love" Transliteration: "Pokota! Ai no Tame ni Hashire" (Japanese: ポコ太!愛のために走れ)	April 30, 1993
31	"Cookies for Mother's Day"; Transliteration: "Haha no Hi ni Kukkī o" (Japanese: 母の日にクッキーを)	May 7, 1993
32	"Hikaru! Daichi & the shocking kiss" Transliteration: "Hikaru! Daichi to Shōgeki Kisu" (Japanese: ひかる!大地と衝撃キス)	May 14, 1993
33	"Easy Going Kamilu"; Transliteration: "Okiraku Kamiru ni Dai Meiwaku" (Japanese: お気楽カミルに大迷惑)	May 21, 1993
34	"Don't give up! The soft-boiled teacher" Transliteration: "Makeruba! Hanjuku Sensei" (Japanese: 負けるな!半熟先生)	May 28, 1993
35	"Be careful with the puppy Pochi"; Transliteration: "Meiken Pochi ni Yōjin!" (Japanese: 迷犬ポチにご用心!)	June 4, 1993
36	"Hasekura-sempai! Youthful travels" Transliteration: "Hasekura-senpai! Seishun no Tabitachi" (Japanese: 支倉先輩!青春の旅立ち)	June 11, 1993
37	"The day the hideout disappeared..." Transliteration: "Kakurega ga Nakunaru Hi..." (Japanese: 隠れ家がなくなる日…)	June 18, 1993
38	"Mischievous fairies causing big trouble!!" Transliteration: "Itazura Yōsei Dai Sōdō" (Japanese: いたずら妖精 大騒動!)	June 25, 1993
39	"Trap of the sweet hotcakes" Transliteration: "Hottokēki wa Amai Wana" (Japanese: ホットケーキは甘い罠)	July 2, 1993
40	"Big plans for a confused friendship" Transliteration: "Hachamecha Yūjō Dai Sakusen" (Japanese: ハチャメチャ友情大作戦)	July 9, 1993
41	"The little lovers" Transliteration: "Chīsana Koibito-tachi" (Japanese: 小さな恋人たち)	July 16, 1993
42	"UFO camp" Transliteration: "Kyanpu de UFO!" (Japanese: キャンプでUFO!)	July 23, 1993
43	"Sunrise at the pool" Transliteration: "Pūru de Dokkiri!" (Japanese: プールでドッキリ!)	July 30, 1993
44	"Hikaru's "doesn't get it" summer vacation" Transliteration: "Hikaru no Korinai Natsuyasumi" (Japanese: ひかるの懲りない夏休み)	August 6, 1993
45	"Memory of a first love" Transliteration: "Hatsukoi no Memowāru" (Japanese: 初恋メモワール)	August 13, 1993
46	"Hasekura sempai...goodbye" Transliteration: "Hasekura Senpai... Sayōnara" (Japanese: 支倉先輩…さようなら)	August 20, 1993
47	"Summer vacation without Daichi"; Transliteration: "Daichi no Inai Natsuyasumi" (Japanese: 大地のいない夏休み)	August 27, 1993
48	"Mom's the target" Transliteration: "Nerawareta Okāsan" (Japanese: 狙われたおかあさん)	September 3, 1993
49	"Heart baton run amok" Transliteration: "Hāto Takuto de Ō Abare" (Japanese: ハートタクトで大あばれ)	September 10, 1993
50	"Small Hime-chan's huge mistake" Transliteration: "Sumōru Hime-chan Dai Shippai" (Japanese: スモール姫ちゃん大失敗)	September 17, 1993
51	"A ribbon's promise" Transliteration: "Ribon no Yakusoku" (Japanese: リボンの約束)	September 24, 1993
52	"Farewell Pokota?"; Transliteration: "Pokota to Owakare?" (Japanese: ポコ太とお別れ?)	October 1, 1993
53	"Love stories are hard" Transliteration: "Rabu Sutōrī wa Tsurai yo" (Japanese: ラブストーリーはつらいヨ)	October 8, 1993
54	"Manami fights for kendo" Transliteration: "Manami no Kendō Icchokusen" (Japanese: 愛美の剣道一直線)	October 15, 1993
55	"Himeko's noisy love lecture" Transliteration: "Himeko no Dotabata Ren'ai Kōza" (Japanese: 姫子のドタバタ恋愛講座)	October 22, 1993
56	"Memory playback" Transliteration: "Omoide Pureibakku" (Japanese: 思い出プレイバック)	October 29, 1993
57	"A little premonition of love" Transliteration: "Chotto dake Koi no Yokan" (Japanese: ちょっとだけ恋の予感)	November 5, 1993
58	"Take me to my future" Transliteration: "Watashi o Mirai ni Tsuretette" (Japanese: 私を未来に連れてって)	November 12, 1993
59	"Many goodbyes" Transliteration: "Sayonara ga Ippai" (Japanese: さよならがいっぱい)	November 19, 1993
60	"I love Daichi!"; Transliteration: "Saichi ga Daisuki" (Japanese: 大地が大好き)	November 26, 1993
61	"Land of Magic in an Uproar"; Transliteration: "Mahō no Kuni wa Dai Sōdō" (Japanese: 魔法の国は大騒動)	December 3, 1993

== Music ==
Opening Themes
#	Transcription/Translation	Performed by	Episodes
	Egao no Genki	SMAP	All

Ending themes
#	Transcription/Translation	Performed by	Episodes
1	Bura Bura Sasete	SMAP	1-31
2	Hajimete no Natsu	SMAP	32-53
3	Kimi wa Kimi da yo	SMAP	54-61

== Reception ==
Jennifer B from THEM Anime reviews stated that Hime-chan's Ribbon is "a fun, cute series that's worth watching if you like magical girl shows" and "Hime-chan herself is a likable character". Andrew Sheldon from Anime-Meta Review felt that "The writing is well done, has a great sense of character and can be touching". Kelly Mayback from the Anime Cafe: A Parent's Guide to Anime described it as "an EXCELLENT series to use when exploring Japanese culture".

== Remake ==
In 2009 the series was remade, with manga creator Shiho Komiyuno penning the series. Hime-chan no Ribon Colorful premiered in the October 2009 issue of Ribon, the same magazine that the original series ran in. Differences between the two series included the setting being moved to modern day as well as the character of Pokota being replaced by a shape changing Princess Erika.

Preceded by Genji Tsūshin Agedama (October 4, 1991 – September 25, 1992)	TV Tokyo Friday 18:00-18:30 Timeframe Hime-chan's Ribbon (October 2, 1992 - December 3, 1993)	Succeeded by Akazukin Chacha (January 7, 1994 - June 30, 1995)
