= Ultra Maniac =

2003 Japanese anime series

- North American cover of Ultra Maniac volume 1 featuring Ayu (right) and Nina (left)

ウルトラマニアック (Urutora Maniakku)
- Genre: Fantasy; Romantic comedy
- Manga
- Written by: Wataru Yoshizumi
- Published by: Shueisha
- English publisher: NA: Viz Media
- Imprint: Ribon Mascot Comics
- Magazine: Ribon
- Original run: February 2001 – January 2004
- Volumes: 5
- Original video animation
- Directed by: Nanako Shimazaki
- Produced by: Kiyonori Hirase; Naomi Satō
- Written by: Yasuko Ōe
- Studio: Ashi Productions
- Released: August 6, 2002
- Runtime: 21 minutes
- Anime television series
- Directed by: Shin'ichi Masaki
- Produced by: Kiyonori Hirase; Naomi Satō; Gō Shukuri; Katsunori Narumo
- Written by: Miho Maruo
- Music by: Tōru Yukawa
- Studio: Ashi Productions
- Licensed by: NA: Geneon Entertainment (2005–2006); Discotek Media (2017–present); SEA: Animation International
- Original network: Animax
- English network: SEA: Animax
- Original run: May 20, 2003 – November 11, 2003
- Episodes: 26

Ultra Maniac is a Japanese romantic comedy manga series written by Wataru Yoshizumi. It features two eighth grade students named Ayu Tateishi, a tennis club member, and Nina Sakura, who is actually a trainee witch from the magical kingdom. A manga adaption began serialization in Shueisha's Ribon magazine from February 2001 until January 2004, published in five collected volumes. Viz Media licensed and released an English translation of the series in North America. With Miho Shimogasa (character designer of Cutie Honey Flash and one of the animation directors of Sailor Moon) by designing the characters and Animation Production by Ashi Productions (who did with Magical Princess Minky Momo, Magical Angel Sweet Mint, Jankenman, and Flower Witch Mary Bell).

The series was first adapted into a 20-minute original video animation on August 6, 2002. It was also adapted into a 26-episode anime television series from May until November 2003, later licensed for Region 1 distribution by Geneon Entertainment. Both the original video animation and television series were produced by Ashi Productions as well as Animax.

== Plot ==
Ayu Tateishi, an ordinary eighth grade middle school student, finds her friend Nina Sakura outside of the school. Nina explains that she lost something beloved to her earlier that day. Ayu offers to help Nina look for her lost item, but Nina seems reluctant to say what the item is that she lost, and runs off. On her way home, Ayu finds a small computer underneath the bench she knew Nina to be at earlier that day. After returning the item to Nina, Nina struggles to decide whether to let Ayu in on the "big secret" she keeps.

Wanting to know Ayu's behavior, Nina starts to follow Ayu around and eventually decides she can trust Ayu. Nina reveals that she is actually from the Magic Kingdom and is a magical girl. However, Ayu initially did not believe Nina and thought she was a little clumsy. The former herself had always shunned the ideas of magic and fairy-tales, even admitting she had never read Harry Potter, thus having someone tell her they are a witch might not be something she can easily accept. After several mishaps with her magic, Nina proves she is a magical girl, and a failure who came to Earth as her last chance to prove that she can get things right. These first mishaps and the fact that Nina has shared her secret with Ayu and helps Ayu in winning the heart of her crush, Tetsushi Kaji. As their adventures progress, many residents from the Magic Kingdom come and visit Nina much to Ayu's chagrin.

The anime adaptation has a different plot when Ayu and Nina met. Rather than coming as a witch failure who is trying to prove herself to be more than she is said to be, Nina has come to Earth to find the five "Holy Stones". She tells Ayu that whoever collects all five will qualify to marry the prince of the Magic Kingdom. Nina's childhood friend, Maya, is the first person to arrive on Earth with her to find the stones. Although Nina collects all of them first, she learns that the prince and Maya are in love with each other. As Nina gives up the stones and her dream, the couple's romantic relationship is made official while she stays on Earth with her friends.

== Characters ==
Ayu Tateishi (立石 亜由, Tateishi Ayu)
Voiced by: Yui Horie (TV Series), Satsuki Yukino (OVA) (Japanese); Stephanie Sheh (English)
Ayu is a calm and collected girl with a cool image to impress her crush, Tetsushi Kaji. She serves as captain of the girls' tennis club.
Nina Sakura (佐倉 仁菜, Sakura Nina)
Voiced by: Akemi Kanda (TV series), Mayuko Omimura (OVA) (Japanese); Carrie Savage (English)
Nina is Ayu's energetic and sociable friend who often seen tries to help her with love. She wants her friends to live a happy life, even if it means suffering a little grief herself.
Tetsushi Kaji (架地 哲士, Kaji Tetsushi)
Voiced by: Hiroshi Kamiya (Japanese); Tony Oliver (English)
Considered the most popular boy in school by the girls, Tetsushi is an ordinary middle school student with a cool persona and a nice smile. Nina has a crush on Tetsushi during the second volume of the manga, but she forgets her original feelings for him while seeing how Ayu feels towards him. In both the manga and anime, Tetsushi and Ayu eventually begin dating.
Hiroki Tsujiai (辻合 宏基, Tsujiai Hiroki)
Voiced by: Susumu Chiba (Japanese); Yuri Lowenthal (English)
Hiroki is Tetsushi's best friend who is often seen together with him and serves as captain of the boys' tennis club. He has a good sense of self-worth and is in love with Nina; they eventually begin dating midway through the series.
Yuta Kirishima (桐島 由多, Kirishima Yuta)
Voiced by: Yu Hayashi (Japanese); Peter Doyle (English)
Yuta is Nina's kindhearted childhood friend from the Magic Kingdom. He does not need a computer to cast spells like Nina does, and teases her about that frequently.
Leo (リオ, Rio)
Voiced by: Reiko Takagi (Japanese); Sherry Lynn (English)
Leo is Nina's cat with the ability of turning into a boy using a magic candy.
Maya Orihara (織原 マヤ, Orihara Maya)
Voiced by: Saeko Chiba (Japanese); Philece Sampler (English)
One of the candidates to be the princess of the Magic Kingdom and Nina's childhood friend, Maya has a pet chameleon named Ruru (ルル) and a talking crow named Shiro who wears an orange bandana. Her hobby is black magic. Initially had a rivalry with Nina, they become friends in episode 26 of the anime. Maya has a crush on the prince, who loved her since they danced together as children and she saved him. The couple eventually got married as Maya princess of the Magic Kingdom.
Sayaka Nakamura (仲村 紗也香, Nakamura Sayaka)
A manga-exclusive character, Sayaka is a self-taught magician who displays a hostile behavior towards all of her classmates. She is interested in dating Yuta, but has a secret agenda. Sayaka is revealed to be half-witch on her late mother's side. Growing up on Earth, Yuta and Nina could not detect that she had magical powers.
Jun Kawanakajima (川中島 純, Kawanakajima Jun)
Voiced by: Isao Yamagishi (Japanese); Doug Erholtz (English)
An anime-exclusive character, Jun serves as Committee Chairman at Ayu and Nina's school. He is determined to expose Nina as a witch and is constantly trying to take pictures of her. After seeing Maya, Jun realizes that she became an evil witch due to her dark magic.
Mito Kirishima (桐島 美斗, Kirishima Mito)
A manga-only character, Mito is Yuta's flirty older sister. She takes Nina and Ayu to bars and tends to get them in trouble.
The Principal
A cheerful member of the school.
Pine (パイン, Pain), Bamboo (バンブ, Banbu) and Plum (プラム, Puramu)
A trio of little girls who are loyal towards Nina with the ability to ride on a blue stuffed dinosaur that uses its tail as a propeller.

== Media ==
=== Manga ===
Ultra Maniac premiered in the February 2002 issue of Ribon, with each chapter published monthly until it ended in the January 2004 issue. It was also published in five tankōbon by Shueisha.

Viz Media licensed Ultra Maniac for an English-language release in North America. The series was released from July 5, 2005, to March 7, 2006.

=== Volume list ===
| No. | Original release date | Original ISBN | North American release date | North American ISBN |
|---|---|---|---|---|
| 01 | August 6, 2002 | 4-08-856393-X | July 5, 2005 | 1-59116-917-8 |
| 02 | January 15, 2003 | 4-08-856431-6 | September 13, 2005 | 1-59116-974-7 |
| 03 | June 13, 2003 | 4-08-856467-7 | November 1, 2005 | 1-4215-0056-6 |
| 04 | December 15, 2003 | 4-08-856507-X | January 3, 2006 | 1-4215-0204-6 |
| 05 | May 14, 2004 | 4-08-856535-5 | March 7, 2006 | 1-4215-0330-1 |

=== Anime ===
The Ultra Maniac series was produced by the anime television network, Animax, who have broadcast the series exclusively across Japan, East Asia, Southeast Asia, South Asia, and other regions, dubbing and broadcasting the series into English and other languages. It has been licensed for North American distribution by Geneon Entertainment, who have released the series across the region via a 7-volume DVD release, the first of which was released on April 4, 2005, and the last of which was released on April 18, 2006. The series was released on DVD by Discotek Media on April 25, 2017.

| No. | Title | Original release date |
|---|---|---|
| 1 | "Ayu and Nina" | May 20, 2003 |
Ayu Tateishi knows the secret of her best friend, Nina Sakura, a witch apprentice who struggles in magic skills. Nina tries to use her powers to make a boy named Tetsushi Kaji like Ayu, but ends up causing more harm.
| 2 | "Boy Meets Girl" | May 27, 2003 |
Nina's childhood friend from Magic Kingdom, Yuta, seems to develop feelings for Ayu until Ayu accidentally takes a picture of him with a magic camera which shows the person someone likes. Yuta lets Ayu take the last picture on Kaji to find out who he likes, but she is too scared. Ayu accidentally takes a picture of Yuta and Nina, revealing his feelings.
| 3 | "Change Over" | June 3, 2003 |
Ayu must beat Tsujiai in a tennis match to decide which tennis team gets three tennis courts. Wanting to make things fair, Nina turns Ayu into a boy to help her win a match with Hiroki, but the change in height makes her lose. When the gang sings karaoke, Nina also turns into a boy, while Ayu tries to prevent another girl from flirting with Kaji.
| 4 | "D.C. (Da Capo)" | June 10, 2003 |
Nina approaches Ayu at a store and recounts how they met each other. When Ayu comes across a girl on a flying magic scooter with a talking cat, she never dreams that the magical witch will save her life and ends up becoming her friend.
| 5 | "Enigma" | June 17, 2003 |
Together with Tetsushi and Hiroki, Ayu and Nina find the secret room in the school, which happens to be the location of a coveted Holy Stone. When Nina's childhood friend, Maya, comes into the picture, they end up chasing after her to find the Holy Stone.
| 6 | "Fight Over" | June 24, 2003 |
The baseball and tennis classes go on a trip into the woods for sports camp, tagging Nina along with them to participate in a test of courage. Nina finds out that the reason Ayu is so worried about maintaining her image because when she was still interested in him a little, the former told that she liked her cool and composed nature. On the woord, Ayu tries to stop Akiho from making her move on Tetsushi, as Nina and Maya try to find another Holy Stone. Thinking that Maya is a ghost, Ayu runs away to ruin her image by being scared.
| 7 | "Gigantic Pets" | July 1, 2003 |
Wanting to punish some mice, Maya makes a potion that is supposed to shrink things, but it makes things grow bigger instead. Even worse, Ruru accidentally drank some of it, causing her to grow larger. Nina must try to hide Ruru as Maya works on getting the dispel magic. Whe Nina helps Maya hide Ruru, a foolish Ayu distracts the class, once again ruining her image in front of Kaji.
| 8 | "Hello, Little Girls" | July 8, 2003 |
Three little girls from Nina's world named Bamboo, Pine, Plum come to earth to help search for the Holy Stone. Unfortunately, they cannot seem to hide magic, causing troubles for Nina and Ayu.
| 9 | "Item" | July 15, 2003 |
Nina gets angry at Yuta's childish pranks and tells him to go back home. While trying to find the red Holy Stone that Ayu does not know about, she and Nina are surprised to see Yuta helping Maya obtain it.
| 10 | "Jack Straw" | July 22, 2003 |
Ayu plans a sleepover at Nina's house to help her study for the upcoming exam. Meanwhile, Maya puts a spell on a doll to make it a voodoo one and sends it to stop Nina from gathering the holy stones. Maya orders it to hurt Nina, but the doll keeps failing and hurting and scaring Ayu instead. The doll initially had to poison Nina, but turns to have a good heart upon noticing her kindness.
| 11 | "Knight Spirit" | July 29, 2003 |
Maya's butler, Sebastian, comes to the human world and attempts to lay down his life for her, only to get in the way of Maya's magic. Inside the library, Sebastian accidentally spills a potion that makes anything on paper come to life, including a buffalo. With Nina, Ayu, Maya and Sebastian being stuck the library with a buffalo enchanted out of a book, the latter must prove himself to be useful.
| 12 | "Lovesick Night" | August 5, 2003 |
During the Fireworks Festival, Maya and Nina think there is a Holy Stone near Ayu's House. Kaji sees Maya at the fireworks show and wants her to join him and the others, then saves Maya from falling. When Ayu thinks the couple is hugging, Nina uses magic to make a yukata for her. A depressed Ayu gets into a rowboat in the middle of the lake, which springs a leak when she accidentally hits another boat, and her magical dress starts dissolving. Nina must use magic to help her without noticing Tsujiai.
| 13 | "Magic Vest" | August 12, 2003 |
Nina accidentally sells her father's magic vest and must get it back. Ayu and Nina visit a fortune-teller, who turns out to be Maya, but they do not figure that out. Nina wonders whether she can trust Tsujiai of her secret being a witch.
| 14 | "Negative Girl" | August 19, 2003 |
Maya's friend, Luna, visits Maya and accidentally drops her bag, only to be picked up by Kaji. Luna thanks Kaji for his help and falls in love with him, before finding gifts that he finds repulsive, such as a plant shaped like a dead lizard. When Luna forces Maya to help her with her newfound crush, Nina must stop her from using magic on Kaji.
| 15 | "Orange Stone" | August 26, 2003 |
Maya starts to talk to Tsujiai after finding out that the holy stone is near his house. When they enter his beach house along with Ayu and Nina, Maya tags along to obtain a holy stone. She confesses to Tsujiai, but he believes there has been someone in his heart. Both Nina and Maya find the orange holy stone near Tsujiai's beach house.
| 16 | "Pinch Hitter" | September 2, 2003 |
During a baseball game, Kaji gets knocked out when he is hit with the ball. Ayu learns more about Akiho and Kaji's relationship. With all of her powers, Nina finally uses magic.
| 17 | "Quest" | September 9, 2003 |
After Tsujiai sees Rio transform, he asks Nina if she can transform his cat into a human, to which she accepts. However, once Nina turns Tsujiai into a human, he does not want to change back into a cat. Meanwhile, Rio starts to develop a crush on Ayu's dog, Tamako.
| 18 | "R&B" | September 16, 2003 |
Upon receiving a club invitation, Nina uses magic to change her and Ayu into 20-year-old women. At the club, Ayu sees Yuta and realizes that he was sent an invitation as well.
| 19 | "Stand By Me" | September 23, 2003 |
Nina's grandfather decides to take matters into his own hands by trying to get Ayu not to be friends with Nina anymore, thinking that Ayu caused Nina to lose magic ability.
| 20 | "Tangle" | September 30, 2003 |
The girls from the baking class give Kaji and Ayu cookies, with Nina finding the "dark side" of Kaji.
| 21 | "Untangle" | October 7, 2003 |
Nina finally figures out Kaji likes Ayu and wants them to meet each other at the library. Initially, Ayu rejected due to Nina discussing his "dark side". Ayu eventually tells Kaji that she likes him.
| 22 | "Virgin Love" | October 14, 2003 |
As rumors of Ayu and Kaji loving each other are proven true, Nina fails her English test and studies really hard. Maya makes a potion and feeds it to a plant. The plant steals the hearts of girls who are in love and summons a holy stone, Nina decides to return them to their original places.
| 23 | "Wonderful Night" | October 21, 2003 |
When Nina tells Kaji she is a magical girl, Yuta gives her a magic ride and helps her with Tsujiai.
| 24 | "X-day" | October 28, 2003 |
Ayu and Nina's class plans a costume party based on Romeo and Juliet. In the meantime, Nina dresses up as Sherlock Holmes and hopes to create more memories with Tsujiai but cannot find him as he is dressed up as a robot. Nina seems to notice him a bit while she was dancing with a boy who was actually the prince of the Magic Kingdom but afterwards, he disappeared. Maya tries to find the last holy stone before Nina. Note: The classical piece "The Blue Danube" is played when Ayu (as Juliet Capulet) and Tetsushi (as Romeo Montague) dance the love waltz.
| 25 | "Yes, I Like You" | November 4, 2003 |
Nina's grandpa is stuck into the dark zone (created by Maya's black magic). Nina, Ayu, Kaji, and Tsujiai jump in to try to save him. Facing the danger of possibly falling into the abyss of the dark zone for an eternity, Nina and Tsujiai confess their love for each other.
| 26 | "Zoom In" | November 11, 2003 |
Nina collects all the Holy Stones and says goodbye to her friends and returns to the magic kingdom. When Nina tells the prince that it was Maya who he danced with, she gives the Holy Stones to Maya. Maya marries the prince and everyone on earth forgets who she is. Nina continues living on earth with her friends. At the end, Nina and Ayu continue their lives together with their loved ones.
