= Megumi Mizusawa =

Japanese manga artist

- Born: Atsuko Kato; 3 July 1963 (age 62); Osaka, Japan
- Other names: Atsuko Naruse
- Occupation: Manga artist

Megumi Mizusawa (水沢めぐみ, Mizusawa Megumi; born 3 July 1963) is the pen name of a Japanese manga artist. Her real name is Atsuko Naruse, and her maiden name was Katou. She is best known for her manga Hime-chan's Ribbon, which was published in Ribon.

She is good friends with fellow manga artists, Wataru Yoshizumi, Ai Yazawa and Miho Obana.

== Manga ==
- Caramel Diary
- Chime
- Daisuki!
- Gogatsu no Ochakai
- Hime-chan's Ribbon
- Kami-sama no Orgel
- Kimagure na Yokan
- Kirakira 100%
- Kokoro ni Sotto Sasayaite (debut)
- Naisho no Princess
- Nemuri-hime no Eve
- Oshaberi na Jikanwari
- Piyo Piyo Tenshi
- Ponytail Hakusho
- Sora Iro no Melody
- Toe Shoes
- Flowery Dress
