= Wataru Yoshizumi =

Japanese manga artist

Wataru Yoshizumi 吉住 渉
- Born: Mariko Nakai (中井 真里子); June 18, 1963 (age 63); Tokyo, Japan
- Occupation: Manga artist
- Writing career
- Years active: 1984–present
- Notable works: Marmalade Boy, Ultra Maniac

Wataru Yoshizumi (吉住 渉, Yoshizumi Wataru) is a Japanese manga artist. She was born as Mariko Nakai (中井 真里子, Nakai Mariko) on June 18, 1963, in Tokyo, Japan. She graduated with a degree in economics from Hitotsubashi University.

Yoshizumi started her career as a Japanese manga artist while working as an office lady. Her debut manga was a one-shot story called "Radical Romance" that was published in 1984, in the summer issue of Ribon Original. She is known as a social manga artist, and is a good friend of fellow manga artists Naoko Takeuchi, Ai Yazawa, Miho Obana, and Megumi Mizusawa.

As of 2011, Yoshizumi has had works serialized in Ribon, Chorus, and Margaret.

== Works ==
- Quartet Game

This tankōbon contains three early short stories. Along with the title story, the other stories are "Another Day" and "Heart Beat".

- Handsome na Kanojo (Handsome Girl) (9 volumes)

Several volumes of this series include some more early short stories, including Wataru's debut work, "Radical Romance".

- Marmalade Boy (8 volumes)
- Kimi Shika Iranai (I Don't Need Anyone But You) (2 volumes)
- Mint na Bokura (We Are Mint) (6 volumes)
- Random Walk (3 volumes)
- Ultra Maniac (5 volumes)
- Datte Suki Nandamon (Because I Love You) (2 volumes)
- PxP (one-shot)
- Happiness (one-shot)
- Baby It's You (one-shot)
- Cherish (1 volume)
- Spicy Pink
- Cappuccino
- Chitose etc. (7 volumes)
- Marmalade Boy Little
