= List of Marmalade Boy characters =

The main characters Miki (left) and Yuu at center surrounded by the supporting cast. Back, from left to right: Ginta, Suzu, Arimi. Front, from left to right: Meiko, Kei, Satoshi Miwa

The following article is a list of fictional characters from the Japanese manga and anime Marmalade Boy.

== Protagonists ==
=== Miki Koishikawa ===
Miki Koishikawa (小石川 光希, Koishikawa Miki) is the main protagonist of the series. She's a lively high school student who is on the Toryo High School tennis team. She is cheerful, friendly, supportive, outspoken, a big girly girl and good-hearted. On the other hand, she can also be insecure, whiny, clingy, and very emotionally dependent on others. She had a part-time job working in an ice cream parlor, called Bobson's. Later, she works in a small decoration shop.

When she was in junior high, she confessed her love to a male friend of hers named Ginta, but it was a disaster and Miki ended up heartbroken. Eventually she got over it and became friends with him again.

While Miki was in high school, her parents went on a trip to Hawaii and decided to swap spouses with another couple. The other couple had a son the same age as Miki, and they all moved into a large house to live together. That boy was Yuu Matsuura, and Miki started to fall in love with him as they came to know each other better. However, Miki was very uncertain of herself and became jealous because Yuu was always surrounded by other girls, several of them being very beautiful and mature while Miki believes herself to be only average-looking and childish. She and Yuu eventually became a couple, but they didn't tell their parents because they believed their parents would disapprove. They confessed their love to each other in episode 25, and started dating in episode 26. Due to Yuu being away in New York, and Miki tired of worrying all the time, she broke up with him in episode 62. But the two got back together in episode 71 when he returned for summer break. A misunderstanding causes Yuu to believe that they are half-siblings, and he breaks up with her without telling her the real reason, thinking the truth would be more painful. But after some time trying to make the right decision, they decide to marry and ask for their parents' approval. There, they learn that they are not related and receive their parents' blessing. By the end of the anime, they marry; at the end of the manga, they make plans to marry after college. In the anime television series, Miki Koishikawa is voiced by Mariko Kouda in Japanese and Michelle Ruff in English. In the movie, she is played by Hinako Sakurai.

=== Yuu Matsuura ===
Yuu Matsuura (松浦 遊, Matsuura Yū) is the title character of the series. Miki gives him the "Marmalade Boy" moniker as he thinks that he is like marmalade – good looking, and sweet only on the surface, yet bitter. Compared to Miki, Yuu's character is almost a complete opposite to hers, as he tends to be more detached, less emotional, and less open about his feelings. He admits to admiring Miki's ability to show her emotions clearly, and it being one of the reasons he fell in love with her. Yuu is smart and naturally athletic, being able to excel in almost every sport although he did not join any clubs in order to focus on his studies. Yuu's dream is to become an architect and in the anime he leaves to attend St. Andrews high school near New York City to study it there. Yuu teases Miki a lot, but this is his way of showing affection for her. His first kiss with Miki is a complete surprise for her because she had only met him a few days prior at an introductory dinner attended by both their families. The Marmalade Boy Movie, which is a prequel to the TV series and set a few days before this dinner, reveals that Yuu fell in love with Miki before they actually met. It shows that he saw Miki when she was out and followed her, witnessing her interactions with the Gastman Team, all without her knowledge.

One of Yuu's biggest goals, in addition to being an architect, is to uncover his paternity. A series of unfortunate events leads him to believe that Youji is not his biological father. Nobody knows of his quest at first, especially Miki, as he researches various individuals who may or may not have fathered him, culminating with him believing that Jin is his father, and Miki to be his half-sister. However, it is revealed that Youji is his true father and is free to continue his and Miki's relationship. At the end of the anime, they marry; in the manga, they are making plans to marry after college. In the anime television series, Yuu Matsuura is voiced by Ryōtarō Okiayu in Japanese and Michael Lindsay in English. In the movie, he is played by Ryo Yoshizawa.

=== Ginta Suou ===
Ginta Suou (須王 銀太, Suō Ginta) is Miki's best male friend and a member of the Toryo tennis team. Miki has had a crush on him since junior high and confessed her feelings to Ginta in a note. However, the note was found by Ginta's classmates, and Ginta downplayed it, without knowing at the time that she was watching, although he felt the same way about Miki.

Although he did find out that Miki had witnessed his denial of any interest in her, he was unable to tell her how he really felt until high school. The romantic tension between them comes to a head with Yuu's appearance, which makes them realize that they still have feelings for each other. He decides to go along with Yuu's ex-girlfriend Arimi's proposal that they pose as a couple in order to drive a wedge between Miki and Yuu. In the process however, he starts to develop genuine feelings for Arimi, which she later reciprocates. Ginta Suou is voiced by Jun'ichi Kanemaru in Japanese and Yuri Lowenthal in English. In the movie, he is portrayed by Taiki Sato.

=== Meiko Akizuki ===
Meiko Akizuki (秋月 茗子, Akizuki Meiko) is Miki's best female friend. Meiko is the only child of wealthy parents and is very mature and beautiful. However, her family life is troubled because her parents are unfaithful to each other and constantly argue. She falls in love with Shinichi Namura after realizing that he has the maturity that she craves, but their relationship as teacher/student proves to be a huge hindrance. After finally gaining her parents' approval, they are able to marry. In the anime television series, Meiko Akizuki is voiced by Wakana Yamazaki in Japanese and Kate Higgins in English. In the movie, she is portrayed by Mio Yūki.

=== Arimi Suzuki ===
Arimi Suzuki (鈴木 亜梨実, Suzuki Arimi) is a former classmate of Yuu's at his previous high school-(Sakaki High School). She convinces Yuu to be her "boyfriend" for three months, during which they act as a couple on a trial basis. Arimi attempts to make Yuu to fall in love with her during this time, but fails. At the end of the three months, he still thought of her as a friend.

Miki's indecisiveness about Ginta and Yuu frustrates her, as she does not think that Yuu deserves someone who cannot commit to one person. Arimi teams up with Ginta in an attempt to drive Yuu and Miki apart from each other. However, she eventually realizes that Yuu's behavior around Miki indicates that he does like her, so she stops her pursuit of him. Some time later, she develops feelings for Ginta and they become a couple. In the anime television series, Arimi Suzuki is voiced by Aya Hisakawa in Japanese and Carrie Savage in English. In the movie, she is portrayed by Nina Endo.

== Supporting characters ==
=== Tsutomu Rokutanda ===
Tsutomu Rokutanda (六反田 務, Rokutanda Tsutomu) is Ginta's cousin and a classmate of Arimi's. He has had a crush on her for a very long time. Tsutomu sees himself as Ginta's rival, and Arimi teaming up with Ginta to split Yuu and Miki frustrates him even further. In the anime, after Arimi's definitive rejection Tsutomu befriends a girl named Yayoi and they start dating. In the anime television series, Tsutomu Rokutanda is voiced by Kazunari Tanaka in Japanese and Tom Gibis in English.

=== Satoshi Miwa ===
Satoshi Miwa (三輪 悟史, Miwa Satoshi) is the student body president and a third-year student. Many girls are interested in him, but he is only interested in Meiko, and tries to get her to like him in place of Namura. However, his crude sense of humor does not impress Meiko, who thinks he is an irresponsible playboy. They go out for a time, but Meiko is unable to overcome her feelings for Namura. Satoshi tries several times to make her forget Namura, but eventually he sees that he has no chance to win her over and stops his romantic pursuit of Meiko, staying friends with her instead.

Satoshi is the first person to notice Yuu's interest in architecture. His initially unusual behavior towards Yuu arouses Yuu and Miki's suspicions that he is gay and has a crush on him, which he uses to his advantage. Satoshi and Yuu eventually come to an understanding however, and Satoshi helps Yuu uncover the truth of who his biological father may be, as he suspects that his father Yoshimitsu is a potential candidate. Although it is later revealed that Yoshimitsu is not Yuu's true father, Satoshi and Yuu stay best friends after this. In the anime television series, Satoshi Miwa is voiced by Shinichiro Ohta in Japanese and Skip Stellrecht in English. In the movie, he is portrayed by Kisetsu Fujiwara.

=== Suzu Sakuma ===
Suzu Sakuma (佐久間 すず, Sakuma Suzu) is Satoshi's younger cousin who is a well-known teen model who loves beautiful things. After seeing Yuu's picture, she fell in love with his looks and requested that he be included in a cosmetics commercial that she was shooting. Afterwards, she asked Satoshi to arrange for Yuu to become her math tutor. Feeling that Miki is too plain for Yuu, then believing that Miki is cheating with Kei and that Meiko loves Yuu, Suzu tries to break up Yuu and Miki's relationship. When her efforts cause Miki and Yuu to fight, she feels bad and apologizes. She later meets and begins following Kei, after seeing him play the piano. She also admires him. In the anime adaptation, Suzu is shown to be in love with Yuu herself, rather than wanting to have him date Meiko. In the anime television series, Suzu Sakuma is voiced by Sakura Tange in Japanese and Karen Strassman in English.

=== Kei Tsuchiya ===
Kei Tsuchiya (土屋 蛍, Tsuchiya Kei) is Miki's coworker at Bobson's ice cream parlor who is a talented but troubled pianist. He also falls in love with Miki, and tries to use Miki's lost medallion to cause Yuu to think Miki doesn't want him anymore. This fails however, as Yuu sees through his lies and, though he fights with Miki, they make up. Miki yells at Kei for his immaturity, and forgives him. After some convincing by Miki to regain his confidence in music, Kei quits his job at Bobson's ice cream parlor and says goodbye to Miki, promising to return soon. He is later seen in the regular company of Suzu who started following him after seeing him play the piano. Later, Kei began to grow some feelings for Suzu.

In the anime, Kei reappears later, offering Miki his support after Yuu goes to study abroad. He says he does not need to have Miki forgetting Yuu completely, since he's happy to help her through her ordeal. Miki appreciates his company and even dates him briefly, but she cannot forget Yuu. In the anime television series, Kei Tsuchiya is voiced by Akira Ishida in Japanese and Ogie Banks in English.

=== Shin'ichi Namura ===
Shin'ichi Namura (名村 慎一, Namura Shin'ichi; Shinichi Namura in anime), affectionately known as "Na-chan" by his students, is a former Toryo student who returned to his alma mater as tennis coach and English teacher. He develops feelings for the student Meiko Akizuki, which are reciprocated. However, because she is a student they must keep their relationship secret. The relationship is eventually discovered, embroiling Namura in a big scandal.

Finding his position at Toryo untenable and fearing he'll be a hindrance for Meiko, he resigns and returns to his hometown of Hiroshima in order to study real estate and take over the family business. Namura tries to push Meiko away from him no matter how much he loves her, thinking that he cannot allow her future to be tainted. Ultimately, Meiko proves him wrong, and they reach an agreement: as soon as Meiko graduates and turns 17 (the age at which she can marry Namura without her parents' approval), she will come with him to Hiroshima not only marry him, but also to study literature and become a writer. At the end of the series, the agreement is filled and they marry. In the anime television series, Shin'ichi Namura is voiced by Tōru Furuya in Japanese and Skip Stellrecht in English. In the movie, he is portrayed by Terunosuke Takezai.

=== Yayoi Takase ===
Yayoi Takase (高瀬 弥生, Yayoi Takase; Yayoi Takase in anime), a character exclusive to the anime. This is adorable girl with a childlike voice and a kind heart, whom Rokutanda meets at a New Year's festival. A few months later he meets her again, when she is rejected by a guy who refuses to take her chocolate. Tsutomu calms her down and they eat the chocolate together, after which they eventually become a couple. She is one of the few truly good-natured characters and is certainly the girl who is least likely to sulk and scheme. She has flaws, like an oddball wit, but is one of the few characters, who never mocked or abused at Rokutanda. In the anime television series, Yayoi Takase is voiced by Miki Inoue in Japanese and Stephanie Sheh in English.

=== Jin Koishikawa ===
Miki's father and an accountant who works at a bank. He married Miki's mother Rumi after breaking up with his old girlfriend Chiyako and helping Rumi over her own break up with her boyfriend Youji. They moved to England and had Miki there, then returned to Japan. Later, he and Rumi reencounter Chiyako and Youji, reach an agreement, and swap spouses. In the anime television series, Jin Koishikawa is voiced by Hideyuki Tanaka in Japanese and John DeMita in English. In the movie, he is played by Michitaka Tsutsui.

=== Rumi Matsuura ===
Miki's mother, infamous for her bad cooking. She is cheerful and sweet, and like her ex-husband, a little childlike as well. She works at a cosmetics company. She was married to her old friend Jin Koishikawa, later divorced him on good terms, and married Youji Matsuura, her old flame. In the anime television series, Rumi Matsuura is voiced by Yoko Kawanami in Japanese and Wendee Lee in English. In the movie, she is played by Rei Dan.

=== Youji Matsuura ===
Yuu's father, who works at a trading company. He is mature and quick-witted, like his ex-wife and now best friend Chiyako. He is also good at math, yet horrible at video games. Initially marrying Chiyato after she was dumped by Jin to help support her baby, they remained together after her miscarriage and had Yuu. After divorcing Chiyako, he married Rumi. In the anime television series, Youji Matsuura is voiced by Bin Shimada in Japanese and John DeMita in English. In the movie, he is played by Shosuke Tanihara.

=== Chiyako Koishikawa ===
Yuu's mother, who is a very good cook. She works for a cosmetics company. She also gets along well with Miki, yet tries to not be pushy on her, which Miki appreciates a lot. She was close to her former boss, Yoshimitsu Miwa, but was perceived to be having an affair with him and her relationship with Jin was ruined. She was pregnant by Jin, but he dumped her before she could tell him and the strain of the situation proved to be too much and she suffered a miscarriage. This led Yuu to think that Youji is not his true father. In the anime television series, Chiyako Koishikawa is voiced by Hiroko Emori in Japanese and Cindy Robinson in English. In the movie, she is played by Miho Nakayama.

== Anime-only characters ==
=== Anju Kitahara ===
Yuu's childhood friend, who first appeared in episode 36 of the anime. She is a very soft-spoken person and has been in love with Yuu since the sixth grade. Having met Miki and finding out that she is dating Yuu, she respects their relationship and does not want to come in between them. In fact, Anju confesses to Miki her feeling for Yuu and tells her that she wants to be second to Yuu. Anju has a very life-threatening heart condition. She collapses at Christmas and wakes up in the hospital bed. She tells Yuu that she will have the operation she needs and to go to Miki and that she has gotten over him. She then leaves for America in order to have an operation that will save her. She later appears in New York in episode 52, where Yuu notices that she and Bill make a good couple. In the anime television series, Anju Kitahara is voiced by Kikuko Inoue in Japanese and Kari Wahlgren in English.

=== Michael Grant ===
An exchange student from New York, currently staying at Miki's house. He is in love with Miki ever since they first met, and intends to steal her from Yuu. He doesn't like Kei very much and feels uncomfortable around him because Kei wants to steal Miki from Yuu while Yuu was studying in New York, like himself. He doesn't bother Miki when she's upset or crying in her room, though he once climbed to her window like Yuu did. In the anime television series, Michael Grant is voiced by Hikaru Midorikawa in Japanese and Sam Riegel in English.

=== Brian Grant ===
Michael's older brother who lives in New York and goes to the same school that Yuu goes to in the last season. He is quick-tempered. He is in love with Jinny, but she keeps pushing him away, which makes him very upset. He sees Jinny kissing Yuu without warning, which prompts him to jealously call Michael, telling him that Yuu is being unfaithful to Miki, causing problems in Japan. However, when he challenges Yuu to a basketball game and loses, they both become best friends and is supportive of his relationship with Miki. After Jinny turn him down for Bill, he decides to date Doris after hearing her confession. In the anime television series, Brian Grant is voiced by Toshiyuki Morikawa in Japanese and Tony Schnur in English.

=== Jinny Golding ===
A girl who is Yuu's classmate when he goes to America. She is out-going and fun. She immediately falls for Yuu, when she first meets him. She is the object of affection to Brian, who keeps turning him down. Yuu tells her that he is in a relationship with Miki in episode 55. She, like Arimi, will stop at nothing to be with Yuu. However, unlike Arimi, she is more aggressive. She reaches the low point of evil, when in episode 61, she tells Miki she slept with Yuu. Bill, Yuu's roommate, finds this out a couple of episodes later and confronts her about it. Doris, Jinny's roommate, also finds out and tells Jinny she must apologize to Yuu for it. Jinny later does, and Yuu gently tells her that it's his own fault for his breakup with Miki. She encourages Yuu to go back to Japan and make up with Miki. Surprisingly, she later dates Bill, who she initially thought was gay. In the anime television series, Jinny Golding is voiced by Yuka Koyama in Japanese and Tara Platt in English.

=== Bill Matheson ===
He is Yuu's roommate in America and best friend to Brian. He and Yuu become instant friends. Although his behavior around Yuu has led some to believe he's gay. He is very supportive and kind to all his friends. He has a crush on Jinny, and lets her pretend to think that he is gay in order to get close to her. Eventually, he and Jinny hook up in episode 69 of the anime. In the anime television series, Bill Matheson is voiced by Nobuyuki Hiyama in Japanese and Tony Oliver in English.

=== Doris O'Connor ===
She is Jinny's roommate and best friend. Unlike Jinny, she is more down-to-earth, intelligent and practical. She is a good confidant to all her friends. She likes Brian and confesses to him after Jinny and Bill get together. Brian accepts and they became a couple. In the anime television series, Doris O'Connor is voiced by Shiho Niiyama in Japanese and Julie Ann Taylor in English.

== Marmalade Boy Little Characters ==
=== Rikka Matsura ===
Half-sister of Miki and Yuu. Her parents are Youji and Rumi. She is close with Saku and initially has a crush on Aoi. She struggles between her confusing feelings for Saku when he confesses to her. She eventually falls in love with Saku and they secretly start dating.

=== Saku Koishikawa ===
Half-brother of Miki and Yuu. His parents are Jin and Chiyako. He has been in love with Rikka for as long as he can remember and is determined to marry her. She initially rejects loving him as anything more than a brother. Eventually, they grow closer and secretly start dating.

=== Aoi Namura ===
The son of Meiko and Shinichi. He is Rikka's first crush but he has a girlfriend named Ayano, who breaks up with him. He develops feelings for Rikka and they date for a while before he breaks up with her once he realizes she likes Saku.

=== Rena Sasamiya ===
A popular girl who has a crush on Saku. She tries to get Rikka to go out with Aoi so she can steal Saku, even though she knows he likes only Rikka. She eventually gives up on Saku and agrees to date Shuji but breaks up with him when she falls in love with Aoi, who reciprocates her feelings.

=== Koudai Mitaka ===
Emiri's childhood friend. He shows an interest in Rikka and is jealous of her closeness with Saku. Emiri has feelings for him. This causes her to be estranged from Rikka. He eventually starts going out with Emiri.

=== Noboru Rokutanda ===
Koudai's best friend. His mother is the older sister of Tsutomu Rokutanda. He has a crush on Rena but she rejects him when he confesses immediately after meeting her.

=== Shuji Shinga ===
A classmate who has feelings for Rena. She doesn't reciprocate his feelings due to her having a crush on Saku. She later changes her mind and agrees to be his girlfriend. However, they break up when Rena realizes she likes Aoi.

=== Emiri Kojima ===
Rikka's best friend. She acts as a pillar of support for Rikka's love triangle with Saku, Rena, and Aoi. She is in love with Koudai and this causes problems with Rikka, whom Koudai likes. The two eventually start going out.

=== Fuu Matsuura ===
Daughter of Miki and Yuu.

=== Kokona Matsuura ===
Son of Miki and Yuu.
