= Marmalade Boy =

Manga and anime series

- Cover of the first volume of the original Japanese manga release

ママレード·ボーイ (Mamarēdo Bōi)
- Genre: Romantic comedy
- Manga
- Written by: Wataru Yoshizumi
- Published by: Shueisha
- English publisher: NA: Seven Seas Entertainment
- Imprint: Ribon Mascot Comics
- Magazine: Ribon
- Original run: May 1992 – October 1995
- Volumes: 8
- Anime television series
- Directed by: Akinori Yabe
- Produced by: Koichiro Fujita (ABC); Yasuo Kameyama (Asatsu); Hiromi Seki
- Written by: Aya Matsui
- Music by: Keiichi Oku
- Studio: Toei Animation
- Licensed by: NA: Discotek Media
- Original network: ANN (ABC, TV Asahi)
- English network: US: Anime Selects
- Original run: March 13, 1994 – September 3, 1995
- Episodes: 76
- Anime film
- Directed by: Akinori Yabe
- Produced by: Tan Takaiwa; Tomio Anzai; Tsutomu Tomari
- Written by: Aya Matsui
- Music by: Keiichi Oku
- Studio: Toei Animation
- Licensed by: NA: Discotek Media
- Released: March 4, 1995
- Runtime: 26 minutes
- Light novel
- Written by: Yumi Kageyama
- Illustrated by: Wataru Yoshizumi
- Published by: Shueisha
- Magazine: Cobalt Bunko
- Original run: July 1994 – March 1996
- Volumes: 10
- Video game
- Developer: Bandai
- Publisher: Bandai
- Genre: Dating simulation
- Platform: Game Boy, Super Famicom
- Released: January 27, 1995 (Game Boy); April 21, 1995 (Super Famicom)
- Manga

Marmalade Boy Little
- Written by: Wataru Yoshizumi
- Published by: Shueisha
- Magazine: Cocohana
- Original run: March 28, 2013 – September 28, 2018
- Volumes: 7
- Live-action film
- Directed by: Ryūichi Hiroki; Takayuki Mizuno (assistant)
- Produced by: Hiroyoshi Koiwai; Hibiki Itō; Shinzō Matsuhashi; Naoaki Kitajima; Yuya Satoyoshi
- Written by: Taeko Asano; Ryūichi Hiroki
- Music by: Hiroko Sebu
- Studio: Warner Bros. Pictures
- Released: April 27, 2018
- Runtime: 127 minutes

Marmalade Boy (Japanese: ママレード·ボーイ, Hepburn: Mamarēdo Bōi) is a Japanese manga series written and illustrated by Wataru Yoshizumi. It was published in Shueisha's shōjo manga magazine Ribon from May 1992 to October 1995 and collected in eight tankōbon volumes. The series was adapted by Toei Animation as a 76-episode anime television series which aired on TV Asahi in 1994 to 1995. This was followed by a prequel theatrical anime movie in 1995. The series was also adapted as a 30-episode live-action television series that was broadcast in Taiwan in 2002. A live-action film adaptation was released in Japan by Warner Bros. Pictures on April 27, 2018.

== Plot ==
Miki Koishikawa's ordinary life as a sophomore in high school is turned upside down when her parents suddenly announce that they are getting divorced in order to swap partners with a couple they met back in Hawaii. When Miki says she doesn't want to choose who of the two she moves with, her parents tell her not to worry about that because they also plan to move in to a big house with the other couple and their son. They seek her approval of the shocking change, and while at a restaurant during dinner where Miki meets the other couple as well as their teenage son Yuu Matsura, who is around her age, she reluctantly agrees to the arrangement. At first, Yuu appears to be a complete jerk who takes every opportunity to make fun of and tease Miki, but he actually turns out to be fun and attractive, and Miki finds herself falling in love with him. Little by little, she accepts her new family arrangement and opens up to Yuu as they become best friends.

After a while, Miki and Yuu's relationship starts to become complicated because of the former relationships that they've had and developed with other characters. These include Miki's long time classmate and former crush from middle school, Ginta Suou, and Yuu's former girlfriend from his previous school, Arimi Suzuki. A secondary subplot develops when Miki's best friend, Meiko Akizuki, herself starts to have her own problems because of the relationship she has gotten into with one of the school teachers, Shin'ichi Namura.

Throughout the series, Miki and Yuu's relationship is further developed and tried, influenced by the other characters around them and the relationships that they develop with these characters.

== Characters ==
The cast of Marmalade Boy is diverse and largely defined by their relationships with Miki Koishikawa and Yuu Matsuura. Although the relationship between these two protagonists is the primary focus of the series, many of the supporting characters are also well-developed.

== Production ==
When Wataru Yoshizumi first started planning Marmalade Boy, Miki, Yuu, Ginta, and Meiko were all the opposite genders of what they ended up being in the final versions, and Miki's original design looked similar to Yuu's final appearance, while Yuu was an attractive girl with long black hair and a "devilish" and "unpredictable" personality. Yoshizumi notes several reasons behind the changes. Part of the reason was that it was a request from the Ribon publishers, who wanted a female as the central character as the story was going to be included in a "Mother's Day" set with magnets featuring the characters. Her associate editor also expressed concerns that a male hero would be a "sissy" when written about by a female writer. Finally, Yoshizumi herself decided that she would go with a heroine rather than a hero as most of the Ribon readers are girls.

In the original story, the title of Marmalade Boy was an indication of the hero Miki's cheerful, sweet, and naive nature. After redoing the concept, she wanted to keep the original title, changing its meaning to what is stated in the first volume, that Yuu "has lots of bitter bits inside" him but people only see his sweet surface.

The ending for the series was also very different from the final version. Ginta and Arimi were not going to be a couple in the original version, nor was Meiko going to be reunited with Namura. Yoshizumi originally intended for Miki and Yuu to truly be blood siblings, and thus have to break up. Afterwards, Ginta would comfort Miki and promise to wait for her to get over Yuu. Yuu and Meiko would have been shown meeting four years later, having both failed in their previous relationships. The ending would have been more open-ended so readers would have had to wonder what really would happen to everyone. However, as she was writing the third chapter, Yoshizumi became less certain of the ending, as it made Miki and Yuu's parents appear to be awful people for doing such a thing to their children. She also was concerned about how readers would react, and her own feelings of "emptiness" at the sad ending. Her editor agreed that the ending would be bad, so she changed it to the happier one now found in the series.

== Media ==
=== Manga ===
Marmalade Boy first premiered in the May 1992 issue of Ribon where it was serialized monthly until its conclusion in the October 1995 issue. The 39 untitled chapters were collected and published in eight tankōbon volumes by Shueisha starting on December 12, 1992; the last volume was released February 20, 1996. Shueisha later republished the series in six special edition volumes. The first special edition volume was released on March 15, 2004, with new volumes published monthly until the final volume was released on August 11, 2004.

The series was licensed for an English language release in North America by Tokyopop. The individual chapters were serialized by the company's manga anthology Smile from December 2001 through April 2002. Tokyopop released the first collected volume of the series on April 23, 2002, releasing new volumes monthly until the final volume was released August 5, 2003. It was one of the first manga series that Tokyopop released in the original Japanese orientation, in which the book is read from right to left, and with the original sound effects left in place. Tokyopop's volumes of the series are out of print. Shueisha refused to renew the company's license of the series after becoming part-owner of rival publisher Viz Media. At Anime Expo 2022, Seven Seas Entertainment announced that they licensed the series for English publication in collector's edition format. It is also licensed for regional language releases in France by Glenat, in Mexico by Grupo Editorial Vid, in Spain by Planeta DeAgostini Comics, in Italy by Planet Manga, and in Germany by Egmont.

From March 2013 to September 2018, a sequel to Marmalade Boy titled Marmalade Boy Little (ママレード・ボーイ little, Mamarēdo Bōi Ritoru) was serialized in Cocohana. While Miki and Yuu make appearances, the new series, set 13 years after the end of the earlier one, focuses on Rikka Matsuura and Saku Koishikawa, Yuu and Miki's respective sister and brother.

=== Novels ===
The final volume of original Japanese release of the Marmalade Boy Japanese light novels

Marmalade Boy was adapted into a series of Japanese light novels by Yumi Kageyama, with Wataru Yoshizumi acting as illustrator. The ten volume series was published under Shueisha's Cobalt Bunko label from July 1994 through March 1996.

No.	Original release date	Original ISBN
1	July 1994	4-08-611872-6
2	September 1994	4-08-611893-9
3	November 1994	4-08-614013-6
4	December 1994	4-08-614033-0
5	March 1995	4-08-614056-X
6	April 1995	4-08-614073-X
7	July 1995	4-08-614105-1
8	October 1995	4-08-614124-8
9	December 1995	4-08-614156-6
10	March 1996	4-08-614176-0

=== Anime ===
Toei Animation adapted Marmalade Boy into a 76-episode anime television series which aired on TV Asahi in 1994 to 1995. This was followed by a prequel theatrical anime movie in 1995. The anime series was licensed for Region 1 DVD release by Tokyopop, which released the series in four box sets. Tokyopop's license had since expired, leaving the anime out of print, until May 6, 2017, when Discotek Media announced they had licensed the anime, and would release the series in two DVD sets. The first set (episodes 1-38) has been released on August 29, 2017, and the second set (episodes 39–76) on November 28, 2017. An SD on BD Set has been announced for 2018.

The movie for the anime acts as a prequel to the story. Taking place as a flashback after Yuu kisses Miki in the nurse's office, he recalls the first time he met Miki, shortly after his parents told him of their impending divorce and spouse swap. He found Miki practicing tennis in the park and spent the rest of the day following her around, eventually finding out she was to be his new stepsister. According to this movie, Yuu was in love with Miki before the family's meeting. The second Discotek set, as well as the upcoming SD on BD set has the movie packaged in there.

=== Art books ===
- Marmalade Boy: Koi no Style Book, ISBN
- Marmalade Boy: Yoshizumi Wataru Illust-shū, ISBN 4-08-855091-9

=== Games ===
Reception

Review score
Publication	Score	
Publication	Game Boy	SNES
Famicom Tsūshin	5/10, 5/10, 5/10, 5/10 (Note: Each of the four reviewers in Famitsu scored the game on a ten point scale)	7/10, 6/10, 6/10, 5/10

Marmalade Boy, a dating simulation video game was released by Bandai Entertainment for the Nintendo Game Boy system in Japan on January 27, 1995. Based on the manga, the game puts players in the role of Miki, who must try to win the heart of one of her two potential suitors from the series: Yuu or Ginta. In Famicom Tsūshin, the four reviewers gave the game four 5/10 ten ratings each, with the reviewers saying they weren't the audience for the game, but said fans of the original material may enjoy it.

A new version of the game came out for the Super Famicom in Japan on April 21, 1995, which Famicom Tsūshin described as being a re-vamped release of the Game Boy game with more features. Three Famicom Tsūshin reviewers were unenthused by the game, either finding themselves not to be the audience for the game or finding it slow-paced and inferior to similar games like Tokimeki Memorial (1994). Two reviewers compliments the ability to be a female lead with one saying it led them to know what its like being a popular girl while the other saying they felt like a bystander in the choices made in the game.

=== Live-action television series ===
In Taiwan, Marmalade Boy was made into a 30-episode live-action television series called 橘子醬男孩 (pinyin: Júzǐjiāng Nánhái). The series starred pop star Stella as Miki and F4 member Ken Zhu as Yuu; Stella also sang the theme song, "溫室的花 Wēnshì de Huā (Greenhouse Flower)". Although the basic premise was the same, it did not feature many of the characters of the anime, and the love triangles were considerably simplified.

== Reception ==
The English translation of the manga was given a B+ rating by Jason Sondhi of Anime News Network, calling it a classic lighthearted shōjo romance that's sweet and endearing and compulsively readable. Sondhi notes that "Marmalade Boy is a wholly engaging read that does not demand as much in terms of time or money as many longer shōjo titles. Yes, it is clichéd, and yes, there is never any doubt in how the story will eventually turn out, but yes, you will enjoy following it nonetheless."

Serialized in Tokyopop's Smile back in 2001, then collected in 2002, Wataru Yoshizumi's Marmalade Boy helped introduce English language readers to the kind of situation found in shoujo manga, with its story of a pair of teens brought together when their parents swap spouses. The manga has over 10 million copies in print.

Carlos Ross of THEM Anime Reviews gave the anime a rating of 4 out of 5 stars. He praised the story for being engaging, the characters for being very memorable, the voice acting, the soundtrack, and the character designs for being a very faithful rendition of Wataru Yoshizumi's original designs for the manga. However, he criticized the show's low-budget animation, the third season of the anime, and the scriptwriters for an apparent lack of geographical knowledge of the New York metropolitan area, which is where the third season is primarily set. Overall, Ross concludes that "Yes, I like my NCAA football, and I like my action anime. But after watching the entire series of Marmalade Boy, I am genuinely hooked. And I can understand the appeal of this series on a wide level to a mostly female audience. Let's face it, this is a darn good show."
